= Tornado outbreak sequence of April 23–30, 1961 =

Weather event in the United States

Meteorological history
- Formed: April 23, 1961
- Dissipated: April 30, 1961

Tornado outbreak
- Tornadoes: 30
- Max. rating: F4 tornado
- Duration: 8 days, 17 hours, 10 minutes
- Highest gusts: 115 miles per hour (185 km/h); Burtonville, Ohio on April 25.
- Largest hail: 7 inches (18 cm); El Reno, Oklahoma on April 30.
- Max. snowfall: 10 inches (25 cm); Western and Southern South Dakota on April 23.<

Overall effects
- Fatalities: 3 (+2 non-tornadic)
- Injuries: 38 (+12 non-tornadic)
- Damage: $26.810 million (1961 USD)
- Areas affected: Great Plains, Northeastern United States, Mississippi Valley, Midwest, Southeastern United States
- Part of the tornado outbreaks of 1961

Between April 23–30, 1961, a tornado outbreak sequence (Note: An outbreak is generally defined as a group of at least six tornadoes (the number sometimes varies slightly according to local climatology) with no more than a six-hour gap between individual tornadoes. An outbreak sequence, prior to (after) the start of modern records in 1950, is defined as a period of no more than two (one) consecutive days without at least one significant (F2 or stronger) tornado.) struck the Midwest, Ohio, and Mississippi Valleys, and the Eastern United States. Large hailstorms accompanied the tornadoes as well and numerous other weather events also occurred. Three people were killed, 38 others were injured and losses totaled $26.810 million (1961 USD). Two additional fatalities also occurred due to flooding and lightning.

== Meteorological synopsis ==
A series of at least two or three disturbances moved over the US over the timespan of nine days, starting with a strong weather system that came out of the Rocky Mountains on April 22. On April 23, multiple cells impacted the Midwest, with several strong, long-tracked tornadoes being reported, producing several casualties. On April 24, multiple clusters of severe thunderstorms formed over Oklahoma as well as South-Central and Southeastern Kansas. These storms produced multiple reports of wind and hail damage, power outages, funnel clouds, and a tornado. The storms congealed into a squall line that produced additional severe weather and tornadoes along with flash flooding through Missouri into West Virginia overnight into April 25. Following the squall line, a massive cluster of severe and tornadic thunderstorms with torrential downpours formed over Indiana and Tennessee and trekked eastward, producing massive amounts of damage and numerous casualties. General thunderstorms produced scattered activity during April 26-29 before another outbreak surged through the Great Plains on April 30, the final day of the sequence.

== Confirmed tornadoes ==
Confirmed tornadoes by Fujita rating
| FU | F0 | F1 | F2 | F3 | F4 | F5 | Total |
|---|---|---|---|---|---|---|---|
| 0 | 5 | 7 | 12 | 5 | 1 | 0 | 30 |

=== April 23 event ===
List of confirmed tornadoes – Thursday, April 23, 1961 (Note: All dates are based on the local time zone where the tornado touched down; however, all times are in Coordinated Universal Time and dates are split at midnight CST/CDT for consistency.) (Note: Prior to 1994, only the average widths of tornado paths were officially listed.)
| F# | Location | County / Parish | State | Start coord. | Time (UTC) | Path length | Max. width | Summary |
|---|---|---|---|---|---|---|---|---|
| F1 | Holden to S of Centerview | Johnson | MO | 38.72°N 93.98°W | 08:20–08:30 | 7.1 miles (11.4 km) | 50 yards (46 m) | Tornado spotted and tracked by law enforcement throughout its duration. Light poles were blown down and a boat was tossed out of a lake. Losses totaled $2,500. |
| F2 | SE of Leon to Allerton to Moulton to S of Bloomfield | Decatur, Wayne, Appanoose, Davis | IA | 40.72°N 93.73°W | 14:25–? | 68.6 miles (110.4 km) | 600 yards (550 m) | Major damage occurred along the path of this large, long-tracked, strong tornado. The tornado reportedly had twin funnels in Allerton before passing north of Harvard, Seymour. It then moved south of Jerome and north Numa as it moved along the Cooper Creek. It then struck Martinstown and Streppyville before passing south of Centerville, moving through rural town of Thirty in the process. The tornado then passed north of Sedan and through Moulton before briefly becoming a waterspout, sucking a pond dry southwest of Bloomfield. It dissipated shortly afterwards. Two people were injured and losses totaled $5 million. The tornado moved at up to 50 miles per hour (80 km/h). |
| F3 | Southern Marshalltown to Vinton to Center Point to Monticello | Marshall, Tama, Benton, Linn, Jones | IA | 42.03°N 92.92°W | 16:15–? | 87.8 miles (141.3 km) | 800 yards (730 m) | 1 death – See section on that tornado – 12 people were injured and damages were estimated at $5 million. |
| F1 | S of Strasburg | Cass | MO | 38.75°N 94.17°W | 20:00–? | 0.2 miles (0.32 km) | 10 yards (9.1 m) | Tornado damaged several farm buildings causing $2,500 in damage. Witnesses heard loud roaring noises like a freight train before the storm struck. |
| F3 | Lorenzo, IL to Peotone, IL to Belshaw, IN to Roselawn, IN | Will (IL), Lake (IN), Newton (IN) | IL, IN | 41.35°N 88.22°W | 21:45–? | 51.7 miles (83.2 km) | 10 yards (9.1 m) | See section on this tornado – Four people were injured and losses totaled $2.75 million. |
| F1 | Union | Scurry | TX | 32.72°N 100.98°W | 22:00–? | 2 miles (3.2 km) | 880 yards (800 m) | Weak, but large tornado blew down 26 power poles west of Snyder, causing $2,500 in damage. |
| F2 | WNW of Welon | Jackson | OK | 34.68°N 99.45°W | 22:15–? | 0.1 miles (0.16 km) | 10 yards (9.1 m) | A brief, narrow, but strong tornado damaged multiple buildings on a farmstead, causing $25,000 in damage. |

=== April 24 event ===
List of confirmed tornadoes – Friday, April 24, 1961
| F# | Location | County / Parish | State | Start coord. | Time (UTC) | Path length | Max. width | Summary |
|---|---|---|---|---|---|---|---|---|
| F1 | Prescott | Linn | KS | 38.07°N 94.70°W | 00:40–00:45 | 2.7 miles (4.3 km) | 300 yards (270 m) | This weak, but damaging tornado hit the town of Prescott. Trees, several small buildings, and the roof of a high school were damaged and 1.5 miles (2.4 km) of power lines were blown down. Heavy damage also occurred to crops northeast of town. Losses totaled $25,000. |
| F0 | SE of McCord | Osage | OK | 36.62°N 96.93°W | 01:15–? | 0.1 miles (0.16 km) | 10 yards (9.1 m) | Brief, weak tornado touched down in open country for less than a minute, causing no damage, although hail up to 2 inches (5.1 cm) in diameter did cause damage in nearby areas. |
| F3 | Kinderhook to Winchester to S of Waverly | Pike, Scott, Morgan | IL | 39.70°N 91.15°W | 01:30–03:00 | 64.2 miles (103.3 km) | 10 yards (9.1 m) | This long-tracked, strong tornado started in Kinderhook, where it lifted and destroyed a barn before moving eastward at around 42 miles per hour (68 km/h). It passed through Barry, Bloomfield, before reaching its peak intensity in Winchester. Numerous buildings in the town were damaged or destroyed and three people were injured. The tornado then moved back over mostly open terrain before dissipating due south of Waverly. Losses totaled $750,000. The storm also produced heavy lightning, which set fire to a barn in Waverly, and large hail. |

=== April 25 event ===
List of confirmed tornadoes – Saturday, April 25, 1961
| F# | Location | County / Parish | State | Start coord. | Time (UTC) | Path length | Max. width | Summary |
|---|---|---|---|---|---|---|---|---|
| F2 | Jasper | Jasper | MO | 39.70°N 91.15°W | 06:30–? | 9 miles (14 km) | 250 yards (230 m) | Strong tornado moved through Jasper, causing most of its damage east of town. Buildings on eight farms were damaged and several large metal grain bins and stock tanks were blown several hundred yards. A tree 1.5 feet (0.46 m) in diameter was uprooted and flung into a house before landing in its yard. One person was injured and damage was estimated at $25,000. |
| F2 | Everton area | Dade | MO | 37.40°N 93.70°W | 07:00–? | 1 mile (1.6 km) | 250 yards (230 m) | Strong tornado may have come from the same storm that hit Jasper. Buildings on several farms were obliterated and a grain bin full of oats was blown a 1/2 mi (0.80 km) away. Damage was estimated at $25,000. |
| F1 | Wheeling area | Ohio | WV | 39.55°N 82.33°W | 17:00–? | 0.1 miles (0.16 km) | 10 yards (9.1 m) | A pilot reported a tornado embedded within an eastward-advancing squall line. No damage was found. |
| F4 | N of Candleglo Village, IN to Waterloo, IN to Boston, IN to Eaton, OH | Shelby (IN), Rush (IN)), Fayette (IN), Union, Wayne (IN), Preble (OH) | IN, OH | 39.58°N 85.8°W | 20:27–21:56 | 63.1 miles (101.5 km) | 550 yards (500 m) | See section on this tornado – Seven people were injured and losses totaled $12.5 million. |
| F2 | Blanchester to Midland to Martinsville to N of Leesburg | Clinton, Highland | OH | 39.3°N 84°W | 22:00–? | 25 miles (40 km) | 50 yards (46 m) | 2 deaths – A narrow, skipping but strong tornado traveled along and north of SR 28, impacting the towns of Blanchester, Midland, Jonesboro and Martinsville before passing north of New Vienna, Highland, and Leesburg. Two people were killed in separate barns that collapsed west of Jonesboro, including one where cattle was killed as well. Although this may have been a tornado family, damage 40–60 miles (64–97 km) away in Laurelville and Sugar Grove may have also been associated with this tornado. Four people were injured and there was $500,000 in damage. |
| F2 | E of Palmyra to SE of Clarksville | Montgomery | TN | 36.43°N 87.48°W | 00:15–00:30 | 9.4 miles (15.1 km) | 187 yards (171 m) | Strong tornado began near Tarsus and Palmyra and moved east-northeast, causing minor damage to homes in Hackberry and Hematite as it passed north of Antioch. It passed through Hilltop and Round Pond, unroofing a gas station before reaching its peak intensity north of Salem. An old farm house was significantly damaged and several small buildings and tobacco barn were destroyed with debris from the barn being thrown 400 yards (370 m) into another residence, which was also damaged. It then crossed the Cumberland River, damaging two more homes and destroying another barn before dissipating. Two people had minor injuries and damage was estimated at $25,000. One source list the tornado as being 70–300 yards (64–274 m) wide. |

=== April 26 event ===
List of confirmed tornadoes – Sunday, April 26, 1961
| F# | Location | County / Parish | State | Start coord. | Time (UTC) | Path length | Max. width | Summary |
|---|---|---|---|---|---|---|---|---|
| F1 | SW of Ellington | Tolland | CT | 41.90°N 72.50°W | 16:15–? | 0.1 miles (0.16 km) | 10 yards (9.1 m) | Brief tornado destroyed the metal roofs of two 40 ft (12 m) concrete silos, causing $2,500 in damage. The associated storm may have traveled to Middleboro, Massachusetts, where a "freak" storm caused major wind and possible tornado damage. |

=== April 27 event ===
List of confirmed tornadoes – Monday, April 27, 1961
| F# | Location | County / Parish | State | Start coord. | Time (UTC) | Path length | Max. width | Summary |
|---|---|---|---|---|---|---|---|---|
| F2 | W of Spring Hill | Pike | AL | 31.67°N 86.00°W | 15:00–? | 0.1 miles (0.16 km) | 10 yards (9.1 m) | Brief, but strong tornado demolished one home and damaged three others at Center Ridge. Two people were injured and losses totaled $25,000. |
| F2 | E of Lodwick | Marion | TX | 31.67°N 86.00°W | 21:00–? | 2 miles (3.2 km) | 10 yards (9.1 m) | A steel marina on the south side of Lake O' The Pines was obliterated by this narrow, but strong tornado. Steel was "twisted like straw" and some of it was thrown into two boats, damaging both of them. The south section of the floating dock was flipped onto the north section as well. Damage was estimated $250,000. The tornado was only down for 30 seconds. |

=== April 28 event ===
List of confirmed tornadoes – Tuesday, April 28, 1961
| F# | Location | County / Parish | State | Start coord. | Time (UTC) | Path length | Max. width | Summary |
|---|---|---|---|---|---|---|---|---|
| F3 | Rogers Manor | New Castle County | DE | 39.67°N 75.57°W | 21:45–21:46 | 0.3 miles (0.48 km) | 30 yards (27 m) | This brief, but intense tornado north of New Castle obliterated a 13 in (33 cm)-thick wall of a warehouse, which also had multiple large doors ripped off and thrown as much as two blocks away. Six homes suffered roof damage as well and losses totaled $25,000. A funnel cloud was observed with this tornado along with a roaring noise akin to diesel engine of a freight train. This was the only F3/EF3 tornado in the state of Delaware until an EF3 tornado struck Sussex County on April 1, 2023. |

=== April 29 event ===
List of confirmed tornadoes – Wednesday, April 29, 1961
| F# | Location | County / Parish | State | Start coord. | Time (UTC) | Path length | Max. width | Summary |
|---|---|---|---|---|---|---|---|---|
| F2 | Western Corpus Christi to S of Tradewinds | Nueces, San Patricio | TX | 27.8°N 97.45°W | 18:45–19:45 | 16 miles (26 km) | 17 yards (16 m) | Small, but strong tornado unroofed a house and damaged a fruit stand and numerous signs. Losses totaled $25,000. |

=== April 30 event ===
List of confirmed tornadoes – Thursday, April 30, 1961
| F# | Location | County / Parish | State | Start coord. | Time (UTC) | Path length | Max. width | Summary |
|---|---|---|---|---|---|---|---|---|
| F0 | NE of Leedey | Dewey | OK | 35.9°N 99.3°W | 20:00–? | 0.1 miles (0.16 km) | 10 yards (9.1 m) | This was the first of three brief tornadoes to occur in the same general area at the same time with no damage being reported. |
| F0 | NNW of Webb | Dewey | OK | 35.95°N 99.15°W | 20:00–? | 0.1 miles (0.16 km) | 10 yards (9.1 m) | This was the second of three brief tornadoes to occur in the same general area at the same time with no damage being reported. |
| F0 | SSW of Taloga | Dewey | OK | 36°N 99°W | 20:00–? | 0.1 miles (0.16 km) | 10 yards (9.1 m) | This was the third of three brief tornadoes to occur in the same general area at the same time with no damage being reported. |
| F1 | W of Maple City | Cowley | KS | 37.05°N 96.83°W | 23:10–? | 0.5 miles (0.80 km) | 100 yards (91 m) | One of two funnel clouds touched down, causing only minor damage with no monetary value given. |
| F2 | Piedmont to Navina to N of Seward | Canadian, Oklahoma, Logan | OK | 35.65°N 97.75°W | 23:30–? | 18.1 miles (29.1 km) | 200 yards (180 m) | A tornado family first started in Piedmont, where four funnels were spotted by a tornado research plane. One of them briefly touched down and destroyed a barn in Piedmont before lifting, not touching down again until it reached Navina, damaging several farmsteads along a 200 yd (180 m) wide, 3 mi (4.8 km) long path. There was $25,000 in damage. 2 in (5.1 cm) hail from the storm also caused heavy to total destruction of crops as well as window and roof damage in Piedmont. |
| F2 | W of Hominy | Osage | OK | 36.4°N 96.5°W | 23:55–? | 0.1 miles (0.16 km) | 10 yards (9.1 m) | Brief, but strong tornado caused heavy damage to several homes and farmsteads in the Enterprise community. There was $25,000 in damage. |
| F2 | W of El Reno | Canadian | OK | 35.50°N 98.17°W | 00:00–? | 0.1 miles (0.16 km) | 10 yards (9.1 m) | A fence was rolled by this brief, but strong tornado. There was no monetary damage value given. |
| F3 | Northern Minco | Grady | OK | 35.33°N 97.95°W | 00:45–? | 2 miles (3.2 km) | 77 yards (70 m) | A home and automobile were destroyed by this narrow, but intense tornado, injuring the two occupants. Four other homesteads were damaged as well and losses totaled $25,000. Another funnel was spotted southeast of town at around 7 pm CDT, but it did not touch down. |
| F0 | Aurora | Lawrence | MO | 36.98°N 93.73°W | 01:30–? | 0.2 miles (0.32 km) | 10 yards (9.1 m) | Brief, weak tornado touched down in Aurora, causing $30 in damage. |

=== Marshalltown–Vinton–Center Point–Monticello, Iowa ===
Southern Marshalltown–Vinton–Center Point–Monticello, Iowa
F3 tornado
- on the Fujita scale

Overall effects
- Fatalities: 1
- Injuries: 12
- Damage: $5 million (1961 USD)

This large, strong, long-tracked F3 tornado–which was most likely a tornado family–first touched down in Southern Marshalltown and immediately became strong, damaging numerous structures. The damage to the town alone was estimated at $1 million and eyewitnesses reported that tornado had more than one funnel as it passed through town. From there the tornado moved generally eastward at up to 50 miles per hour (80 km/h) on a discontinuous path that may have included more than one tornado. It first passed south of Garwin before crossing the Hinkle Creek directly into Garrison. It then struck the south side of Vinton before moving directly through Center Point and Alice. After crossing the Wapsipinicon River and striking the north side of Central City, it crossed Buffalo Creek, striking areas south of Prairiesburg. It was observed with a double funnel again as it passed by Monticello, one of four times this was reported during the tornado's lifespan. The tornado dissipated shortly after that.

The tornado traveled 87.7 miles (141.1 km), had a maximum width of 800 yards (730 m), and caused $5 million in damage. One person was killed and 12 others were injured. The tornado was also notable because it was embedded within a massive swath of wind and hail damage that was 20–40 miles (32–64 km) wide. Wind gust of up to 100 miles per hour (160 km/h) were recorded along with hail up to 3 inches (7.6 cm) in diameter. Northwest Jones County saw an excessive amount of hail with up to 1 foot (0.30 m) drifts in some areas.

=== Lorenzo–Peotone, Illinois/Belshaw–Roselawn, Indiana ===
Lorenzo–Peotone, Illinois/Belshaw–Roselawn, Indiana
F3 tornado
- on the Fujita scale

Overall effects
- Injuries: 4
- Damage: $2.75 million (1961 USD)

This strong, destructive, long-tracked F3 tornado (which was also likely a tornado family) accompanied by a vicious hailstorm first touched down over Lorenzo, Illinois. It proceeded east-southeastward, immediately becoming strong and destroying seven homes in the town. It then crossed the Kankakee River and passed north of Wilmington, toppling a trailer truck. Passing north of Symerton and south of Wilton Center, the tornado continued to damage numerous homes and farmsteads as it moved through open country, before plowing into Peotone. 600 homes were damaged by both the tornado and the massive hail that fell with it. One hailstone was reportedly 6 inches (15 cm) in diameter, although this was never verified. The Peotone Airport was hit hard as 21 planes were damaged by hail alone, with most being completely totaled beyond repair. All four injuries from the tornado occurred in Peotone when a house trailer was rolled. The tornado then weakened and may have briefly lifted as it passed halfway between Beecher and Polk before abruptly turning southeastward as it entered Indiana on a non-continuous damage path. Throughout Illinois, the tornado injured four and caused $2.5 million in damage.

As the tornado touched downed again in Indiana, more large hail began to fall. The tornado passed west of North Hayden located west of Lowell, Indiana before causing the heaviest damage in the state near Belshaw at the intersection of US 41 and SR 2. Here the tornado damaged multiple farm buildings and toppled 30 billboards along US 41. Hail up to 1.75 inches (4.4 cm) in diameter and a depth of up to an 1 inch (2.5 cm) fell in here and in the nearby town of Schneider, where the hail damage to roofs and windows was the most extensive. The tornado then passed west of Shelby and Thayer before dissipating just outside of Roselawn. The tornado did F2 damage at its peak in Indiana with losses totaling $250,000.

The tornado traveled 51.7 miles (83.2 km), was 10 yards (9.1 m) wide, and caused $2.75 million in damage. There were four injuries.

=== Marion–Waterloo–Boston, Indiana/Eaton, Ohio ===
Marion–Waterloo–Boston, Indiana/Eaton, Ohio
Tornado outbreak
- Max. rating: F4 tornado

Overall effects
- Injuries: 7
- Damage: $12.5 million (1961 USD)

Four funnel clouds consolidated into this long-tracked, violent, skipping multi-vortex F4 tornado–which may have been tornado family of at least two tornadoes. It first touched down in Shelby County, Indiana northwest of Shelbyville along I-74 and immediately became violent, tossing a loaded truck 25 feet (7.6 m). It then proceeded east-northeastward at 46 mph (74 km/h), heavily damaging Marion and Knighthood Village. A total of 10 homes and 21 barns were destroyed, and 11 other homes were badly damaged. One person was injured and losses totaled $2.5 million in the area.

The tornado then continued into rural areas of Rush County, where 15 homes were badly damaged. North of Rushville, multiple trucks were rolled or flipped, injuring three. Homes and buildings south of the town of Gings were also badly damaged and losses in the county reached $2.5 million.

In Fayette County, the tornado moved through mostly rural areas before passing through the three-town trio of Harrisburg, Huber and Waterloo. Waterloo was the hardest hit as multiple homes and buildings were destroyed. Three homes and two mobile homes were obliterated throughout the county before the tornado clipped the northwest side of Union County, passing south of Philomath and Abington. Damage in both counties reached $2.5 million.

Some of the most extreme damage occurred as the tornado entered Wayne County and struck the town of Boston. Two homes and a mobile home were obliterated and three people in one of the homes were injured, one seriously. Heavy damage occurred along the roads heading in and out of town before the tornado moved into Ohio. Losses in Wayne County reached $2.5 million.

The tornado then turned almost due east as it moved into rural Preble County, Ohio. By this point, the skipping nature of the tornado became more evident as it remained on the ground for 1/2–5 miles (0.80–8.05 km) at a time with a width no larger than 75 yards (69 m). Nonetheless, the tornado remained strong to violent. It first struck the town of West Florence, heavily damaging or partially destroying multiple farmhouses and barns. As the tornado entered the west side of Eaton, another farmhouse was obliterated and swept away, although a ring of trees around the home were incredibly left undamaged. A nearby barn was also obliterated and an adjacent housing development of brand new homes was badly damaged. The tornado then weakened, but remained strong as it entered Eaton, damaging a grove of trees as well as the roof of an office buildings and stores. The tornado then weakened further as it continued through the central part of Eaton, causing only light to minor damage to treetops and roofs and breaking windows before finally dissipating on the east side of town. Damage in Ohio reached $2.5 million.

The tornado was on the ground for at least 89 minutes, traveled 63.1 miles (101.5 km), and was 550 yards (500 m) (one source says 900 yards (820 m)) wide. Seven people were injured and losses totaled $12.5 million in damage.

== Non-tornadic impacts ==
Numerous reports of strong winds and large hail were recorded throughout the event. The complex of storms that moved through Ohio on April 25 produced a 115 mph (185 km/h) wind gust southeast of Burtonville. Gigantic hail fell in Oklahoma on April 30, peaking at 7 inches (18 cm) southwest of El Reno. Throughout the event there were 11 reports of hail over 2 inches (5.1 cm) in diameter and nine report of wind gusts over 75 miles per hour (121 km/h).

Flash flooding was also a major issue throughout the event and one man did drown after being caught flood waters caused by Adens Creek in Ohio. Heavy rainfall also caused flash flooding and numerous accidents in Southeastern Kansas on April 30, injuring one.

Lightning was a surprisingly destructive and deadly catalyst during the event. Overnight during April 24-25, multiple lightning strikes across Southern Michigan triggered several fires that seriously damaged homes, destroyed a barn, and caused power outages in both Ann Arbor and Flint. In an extreme case on April 26, static electricity caused by intense lightning strikes caused a premature explosion of a 5-lb. charge of dynamite in a water tunnel that was under construction in Northboro, Massachusetts. One person was killed and 11 others were injured, three seriously, with one man losing his arm.

In Northeastern Montana, rain turned to snow, and high winds from the evening of April 22 into April 23. An all-day blizzard also occurred in Western and Southern North Dakota on April 23, with snow totals reaching as high as 10 inches (25 cm). Since it was heavy, wet snow, it froze up on power lines overnight, leading to widespread power outages.

High winds on the back side of the first system on April 23 caused heavy damage to crops in Southeastern Wyoming, Northwestern Nebraska, and Northeastern Colorado. Greeley, Colorado was especially hard hit as a factory lost approximately 600 acres of sugar beets.

== See also ==
- List of North American tornadoes and tornado outbreaks
