= Burtonville =

Burtonville or Burtonsville may refer to:

== Places ==
Canada

- Burtonsville, Alberta

United States

- Burtonsville, Maryland, a census-designated place
- Burtonville, Ohio, an unincorporated community in Clinton County
- Burtonville, Virginia, an unincorporated community in Greene County
