= Jonesboro =

Jonesboro or Jonesborough is the name of a number of settlements in the United States and the United Kingdom:

== United States ==
- Jonesboro, Arkansas
- Jonesboro, Georgia, originally Jonesborough
  - Battle of Jonesborough, final battle of the Atlanta Campaign
- Jonesboro, Illinois, site of the third of the Lincoln–Douglas debates
- Jonesboro, Indiana
- Jonesboro, Louisiana
- Jonesboro, Maine
- Jonesboro, Ohio
- Jonesboro, Oregon
- Jonesborough, Tennessee, "Tennessee's oldest town"

== United Kingdom ==
- Jonesborough, County Armagh, a small village in Northern Ireland
