= Gurneyville =

Gurneyville may refer to:

- Gurneyville, Alberta, an unincorporated community
- Gurneyville, Ohio, an unincorporated community, in Clinton County
