= Starbucktown, Ohio =

Unincorporated community in Ohio, U.S.

Coordinates: 39°28′35″N 83°47′12″W

Starbucktown is an unincorporated community in Clinton County, in the U.S. state of Ohio.

== History ==
Starbucktown was settled by members of the local Starbuck family.
