= Clinton County, Ohio =

County in Ohio, United States

- County
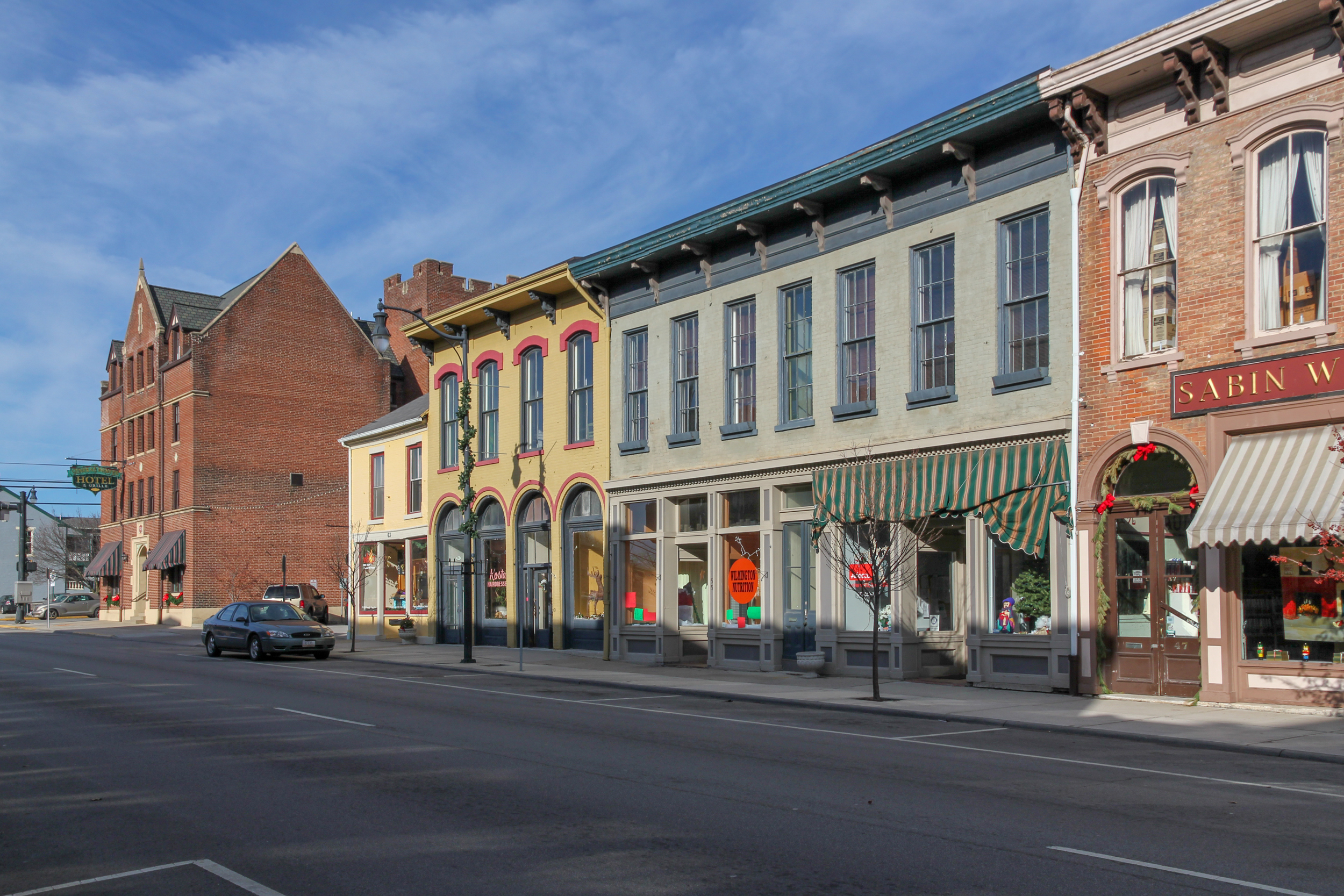
- The Wilmington Commercial Historic District is on the National Register of Historic Places listings in Clinton County

- Flag Seal

- Location within the U.S. state of Ohio
- Coordinates: 39°24′54″N 83°48′30″W
- Country: United States
- State: Ohio
- Founded: March 1, 1810
- Named for: George Clinton
- Seat: Wilmington
- Largest city: Wilmington

Area
  - Total: 412 sq mi (1,070 km^{2})
  - Land: 409 sq mi (1,060 km^{2})
  - Water: 3.6 sq mi (9.3 km^{2}) 0.9%

Population (2020)
  - Total: 42,018
  - Estimate (2025): 42,301 ▲
  - Density: 102.7/sq mi (39.7/km^{2})
- Time zone: UTC−5 (Eastern)
  - Summer (DST): UTC−4 (EDT)
- Congressional district: 2nd
- Website: co.clinton.oh.us

Clinton County is a county located in the U.S. state of Ohio. As of the 2020 United States census, the population was 42,018. Its county seat and largest city is Wilmington. The county is named for former U.S. Vice President George Clinton. Clinton County comprises the Wilmington, Ohio Micropolitan Statistical Area, which is also included in the Cincinnati-Wilmington-Maysville, OH-KY-IN Combined Statistical Area.

== History ==
Clinton County was formed on February 19, 1810, from sections of Highland County and Warren County, with the law creating the county taking effect on March 1 of that year. It was named after George Clinton, a soldier, politician, Governor of New York, and Vice President of the United States.

== Geography ==
According to the U.S. Census Bureau, the county has a total area of 412 square miles (1,070 km^{2}), of which 409 square miles (1,060 km^{2}) is land and 3.6 square miles (9.3 km^{2}) (0.9%) is water.

The entire county lies within the Little Miami River watershed, with the exception of extreme eastern areas, which are within the Scioto River watershed. Clinton County lies within the till plains physiographic region, and is somewhat flat or gently rolling. The northern two thirds of the county were covered with an ice sheet during the Wisconsinan Stage, while the southern third was covered by ice sheets during the much older Illinoian Stage. Because of such a history with ice, glacial features are readily found on the landscape, such as moraines and kames.

The general elevation of the county is roughly 1,050 feet (320 m) above sea level, and there are few areas in the county that deviate from this by more than 200 feet (61 m).

The climate of Clinton County can be classified as humid continental. It is one of the coolest and wettest counties in southern Ohio, although differences between it and other southern Ohio counties are usually very slight. Clinton County averages 42 inches (1.1 m) of precipitation per year, including 30 inches (0.76 m) of snow (Note: one inch of snow does not equal one inch of precipitation). Average July high temperatures reach the mid and upper 80s F although temperatures above 90 F are common, while lows are typically in the 60s F. January high temperatures typically reach the low and mid 30s F, while lows generally bottom out in the 10s F, although lows in the single digits and even below 0 °F or −17.8 °C are common.

Adjacent counties

- Greene County (north)
- Fayette County (northeast)
- Highland County (southeast)
- Brown County (south)
- Clermont County (southwest)
- Warren County (west)

== Major highways ==
- I-71
- US 22
- US 68
- SR 3
- SR 28
- SR 72
- SR 73
- SR 123
- SR 124
- SR 132
- SR 133
- SR 134
- SR 251
- SR 350
- SR 380
- SR 729
- SR 730

== Demographics ==
Historical population
Census	Pop.	Note	%±
1810	2,674		—
1820	8,085		202.4%
1830	11,436		41.4%
1840	15,719		37.5%
1850	18,838		19.8%
1860	21,461		13.9%
1870	21,914		2.1%
1880	24,756		13.0%
1890	24,240		−2.1%
1900	24,202		−0.2%
1910	23,680		−2.2%
1920	23,036		−2.7%
1930	21,547		−6.5%
1940	22,574		4.8%
1950	25,572		13.3%
1960	30,004		17.3%
1970	31,464		4.9%
1980	34,603		10.0%
1990	35,415		2.3%
2000	40,543		14.5%
2010	42,040		3.7%
2020	42,018		−0.1%
2025 (est.)	42,301	▲	0.7%
U.S. Decennial Census; 1790-1960 1900-1990; 1990-2000 2020

=== 2020 census ===
As of the 2020 census, the county had a population of 42,018, and the median age was 40.9 years. 22.2% of residents were under the age of 18 and 18.0% of residents were 65 years of age or older. For every 100 females there were 98.3 males, and for every 100 females age 18 and over there were 95.9 males age 18 and over.

The racial makeup of the county was 91.6% White, 2.0% Black or African American, 0.2% American Indian and Alaska Native, 0.5% Asian, <0.1% Native Hawaiian and Pacific Islander, 1.0% from some other race, and 4.6% from two or more races. Hispanic or Latino residents of any race comprised 1.8% of the population.

29.9% of residents lived in urban areas, while 70.1% lived in rural areas.

There were 16,464 households in the county, of which 29.6% had children under the age of 18 living in them. Of all households, 49.3% were married-couple households, 18.7% were households with a male householder and no spouse or partner present, and 24.2% were households with a female householder and no spouse or partner present. About 27.1% of all households were made up of individuals and 11.6% had someone living alone who was 65 years of age or older.

There were 17,906 housing units, of which 8.1% were vacant. Among occupied housing units, 69.1% were owner-occupied and 30.9% were renter-occupied. The homeowner vacancy rate was 1.7% and the rental vacancy rate was 6.8%.

=== Racial and ethnic composition ===
Clinton County, Ohio – Racial and ethnic composition Note: the US Census treats Hispanic/Latino as an ethnic category. This table excludes Latinos from the racial categories and assigns them to a separate category. Hispanics/Latinos may be of any race.
Race / Ethnicity (NH = Non-Hispanic)	Pop 1980	Pop 1990	Pop 2000	Pop 2010	Pop 2020	% 1980	% 1990	% 2000	% 2010	% 2020
White alone (NH)	33,547	34,373	38,749	39,496	38,247	96.95%	97.06%	95.58%	93.95%	91.03%
Black or African American alone (NH)	708	713	881	905	819	2.05%	2.01%	2.17%	2.15%	1.95%
Native American or Alaska Native alone (NH)	29	54	94	85	96	0.08%	0.15%	0.23%	0.20%	0.23%
Asian alone (NH)	52	138	153	211	205	0.15%	0.39%	0.38%	0.50%	0.49%
Native Hawaiian or Pacific Islander alone (NH)	x	x	1	17	6	x	x	0.00%	0.04%	0.01%
Other race alone (NH)	37	15	22	41	165	0.11%	0.04%	0.05%	0.10%	0.39%
Mixed race or Multiracial (NH)	x	x	377	726	1,715	x	x	0.93%	1.73%	4.08%
Hispanic or Latino (any race)	230	122	266	559	765	0.66%	0.34%	0.66%	1.33%	1.82%
Total	34,603	35,415	40,543	42,040	42,018	100.00%	100.00%	100.00%	100.00%	100.00%

=== 2010 census ===
As of the 2010 United States census, there were 42,040 people, 16,210 households, and 11,364 families living in the county. The population density was 102.9 inhabitants per square mile (39.7/km^{2}). There were 18,133 housing units at an average density of 44.4 per square mile (17.1/km^{2}). The racial makeup of the county was 94.7% white, 2.2% black or African American, 0.5% Asian, 0.2% American Indian, 0.5% from other races, and 1.9% from two or more races. Those of Hispanic or Latino origin made up 1.3% of the population. In terms of ancestry, 26.4% were German, 15.4% were Irish, 12.0% were American, and 11.9% were English.

Of the 16,210 households, 33.5% had children under the age of 18 living with them, 52.9% were married couples living together, 11.9% had a female householder with no husband present, 29.9% were non-families, and 25.1% of all households were made up of individuals. The average household size was 2.52 and the average family size was 2.99. The median age was 38.7 years.

The median income for a household in the county was $46,261 and the median income for a family was $56,208. Males had a median income of $42,134 versus $31,380 for females. The per capita income for the county was $22,163. About 11.2% of families and 14.0% of the population were below the poverty line, including 18.6% of those under age 18 and 7.9% of those age 65 or over.

=== 2000 census ===
As of the census of 2000, there were 40,543 people, 15,416 households, and 11,068 families living in the county. The population density was 99 people per square mile (38 people/km^{2}). There were 16,577 housing units at an average density of 40 per square mile (15/km^{2}). The racial makeup of the county was 95.99% White, 2.19% Black or African American, 0.26% Native American, 0.38% Asian, 0.20% from other races, and 0.97% from two or more races. 0.66% of the population were Hispanic or Latino of any race. 29.3% were of American, 22.2% German, 12.1% English and 10.9% Irish ancestry according to 2000 census.

There were 15,416 households, out of which 34.70% had children under the age of 18 living with them, 57.40% were married couples living together, 10.10% had a female householder with no husband present, and 28.20% were non-families. 23.70% of all households were made up of individuals, and 9.90% had someone living alone who was 65 years of age or older. The average household size was 2.56 and the average family size was 3.03.

In the county, the population was spread out, with 26.40% under the age of 18, 10.20% from 18 to 24, 29.10% from 25 to 44, 22.10% from 45 to 64, and 12.20% who were 65 years of age or older. The median age was 35 years. For every 100 females there were 96.10 males. For every 100 females age 18 and over, there were 92.70 males.

The median income for a household in the county was $40,467, and the median income for a family was $48,158. Males had a median income of $34,448 versus $23,846 for females. The per capita income for the county was $18,462. About 6.40% of families and 8.60% of the population were below the poverty line, including 9.90% of those under age 18 and 11.60% of those age 65 or over.

=== 2005 estimate ===
In 2005 94.7% of the county's population was non-Hispanic whites. Latinos were 1.3% of the population.

== Politics ==
Clinton County is a strongly Republican county. Since 1856, the only Democrat to win a majority in the county has been Lyndon Johnson in 1964, and he did so by only 432 votes.

United States presidential election results for Clinton County, Ohio
Year	Republican		Democratic		Third party(ies)	
Year	No.	%	No.	%	No.	%
1856	2,117	60.02%	1,170	33.17%	240	6.80%
1860	2,483	61.58%	1,464	36.31%	85	2.11%
1864	2,771	66.55%	1,393	33.45%	0	0.00%
1868	2,922	64.92%	1,579	35.08%	0	0.00%
1872	3,105	62.65%	1,786	36.04%	65	1.31%
1876	3,500	62.30%	2,048	36.45%	70	1.25%
1880	3,937	64.29%	2,167	35.39%	20	0.33%
1884	3,864	61.21%	2,284	36.18%	165	2.61%
1888	3,816	59.53%	2,305	35.96%	289	4.51%
1892	3,491	58.88%	2,076	35.01%	362	6.11%
1896	4,144	60.18%	2,657	38.59%	85	1.23%
1900	4,149	62.09%	2,394	35.83%	139	2.08%
1904	3,937	65.79%	1,826	30.51%	221	3.69%
1908	4,107	61.45%	2,464	36.87%	112	1.68%
1912	2,916	48.68%	2,010	33.56%	1,064	17.76%
1916	3,520	56.58%	2,602	41.83%	99	1.59%
1920	6,947	65.61%	3,598	33.98%	43	0.41%
1924	5,954	67.08%	2,496	28.12%	426	4.80%
1928	7,150	72.98%	2,603	26.57%	44	0.45%
1932	5,953	52.37%	5,252	46.20%	163	1.43%
1936	6,265	51.66%	5,785	47.70%	77	0.63%
1940	7,027	58.60%	4,964	41.40%	0	0.00%
1944	7,200	65.98%	3,713	34.02%	0	0.00%
1948	6,009	61.32%	3,758	38.35%	32	0.33%
1952	8,191	67.83%	3,885	32.17%	0	0.00%
1956	7,919	70.07%	3,382	29.93%	0	0.00%
1960	8,464	65.30%	4,498	34.70%	0	0.00%
1964	6,082	48.29%	6,514	51.71%	0	0.00%
1968	6,265	56.56%	2,982	26.92%	1,830	16.52%
1972	8,140	74.08%	2,709	24.65%	139	1.27%
1976	6,597	56.21%	4,959	42.25%	181	1.54%
1980	7,675	61.90%	3,967	31.99%	758	6.11%
1984	9,603	73.77%	3,332	25.60%	83	0.64%
1988	8,856	69.74%	3,746	29.50%	97	0.76%
1992	7,290	47.37%	4,638	30.13%	3,463	22.50%
1996	7,504	51.68%	5,303	36.52%	1,714	11.80%
2000	9,824	65.19%	4,791	31.79%	455	3.02%
2004	12,938	70.26%	5,417	29.42%	59	0.32%
2008	12,409	64.16%	6,558	33.91%	375	1.94%
2012	12,009	66.05%	5,791	31.85%	383	2.11%
2016	13,838	73.74%	4,066	21.67%	862	4.59%
2020	15,488	75.32%	4,697	22.84%	378	1.84%
2024	15,984	76.59%	4,633	22.20%	253	1.21%

United States Senate election results for Clinton County, Ohio1
Year	Republican		Democratic		Third party(ies)	
Year	No.	%	No.	%	No.	%
2024	14,513	70.61%	5,154	25.08%	887	4.32%

== Government ==
The Clinton County Courthouse was built in 1915 in Wilmington. The courthouse is located at 53 E. Main Street.

The Wilmington Public Library of Clinton County serves the communities of Clinton County from its administrative offices and main library in Wilmington and its Clinton-Massie branch in Clarksville. In 2005, the library loaned more than 161,000 items to its 17,000 cardholders. Total holdings as of 2005 were over 64,000 volumes with over 90 periodical subscriptions.

== Education ==
The following school districts have territory in Clinton County. Those primarily in Clinton are in bold, those primarily in other counties are in italics. The county a district is primarily located in is bolded.

- **Blanchester Local School District** (also in Brown, Clermont, and Warren)
- **Clinton-Massie Local School District** (also in Warren)
- **East Clinton Local School District** (also in Fayette, Greene, and Highland)
- Fairfield Local School District (also in **Highland**)
- Fayetteville-Perry Local School District (also in **Brown**)
- Greeneview Local School District (also in **Greene**)
- Lynchburg-Clay Local School District (also in **Highland**)
- Miami Trace Local School District (also in **Fayette**)
- **Wilmington City School District** (also in Greene)
- Xenia Community School District (also in **Greene** and Warren)

== Recreation ==
Clinton County is home to Cowan Lake State Park, where outdoor recreationalists enjoy fishing, swimming, boating, hiking, bicycling, camping, and wildlife viewing. The northwestern border of Clinton County is formed by Caesar Creek Lake, which is part of Caesar Creek State Park. Fossil hunting is popular here, in addition to similar activities enjoyed at Cowan Lake. Wilmington College in Wilmington has several NCAA Division III athletic programs, whose events can be attended by the public. The city is also the home of the Clinton County Corn Festival.

== Transportation ==
Interstate 71 crosses the northern third of the county, trending northeast to southwest and connecting Clinton County to Columbus, Ohio and Cincinnati. Clinton County is part of the Cincinnati-Middletown-Wilmington Combined Statistical Area, although there is little true urban activity in the county. U.S. Route 68 is the major north–south route through the county, while U.S. Route 22 runs east–west. Several other state and local highways serve the residents of Clinton County. Clinton Field is a public use airport located four nautical miles (7 km) northwest of the central business district of Wilmington.

== Communities ==
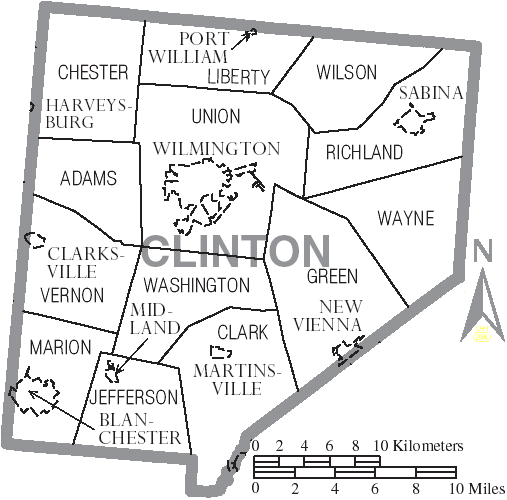
Map of Clinton County, Ohio With Municipal and Township Labels

=== City ===
- Wilmington (county seat)

=== Villages ===
- Blanchester
- Clarksville
- Lynchburg
- Martinsville
- Midland
- New Vienna
- Port William
- Sabina

=== Townships ===
- Adams
- Chester
- Clark
- Green
- Jefferson
- Liberty
- Marion
- Richland
- Union
- Vernon
- Washington
- Wayne
- Wilson

=== Unincorporated communities ===
- Bloomington
- Burtonville
- Cuba
- Farmers
- Gurneyville
- Jonesboro
- Lees Creek
- Lumberton
- McKays Station
- Melvin
- Memphis
- Morrisville
- New Antioch
- North Kingman
- Oakland
- Ogden
- Reesville
- Sligo
- Westboro

=== Ghost town ===
- New Burlington

== See also ==
- National Register of Historic Places listings in Clinton County, Ohio
