= Melvin, Ohio =

Unincorporated community in Ohio, U.S.

Coordinates: 39°28′24″N 83°43′04″W

Melvin is an unincorporated community in Richland Township, Clinton County, Ohio, United States.

== History ==
Melvin had its start in 1883 when the railroad was extended to that point.

== Gallery ==
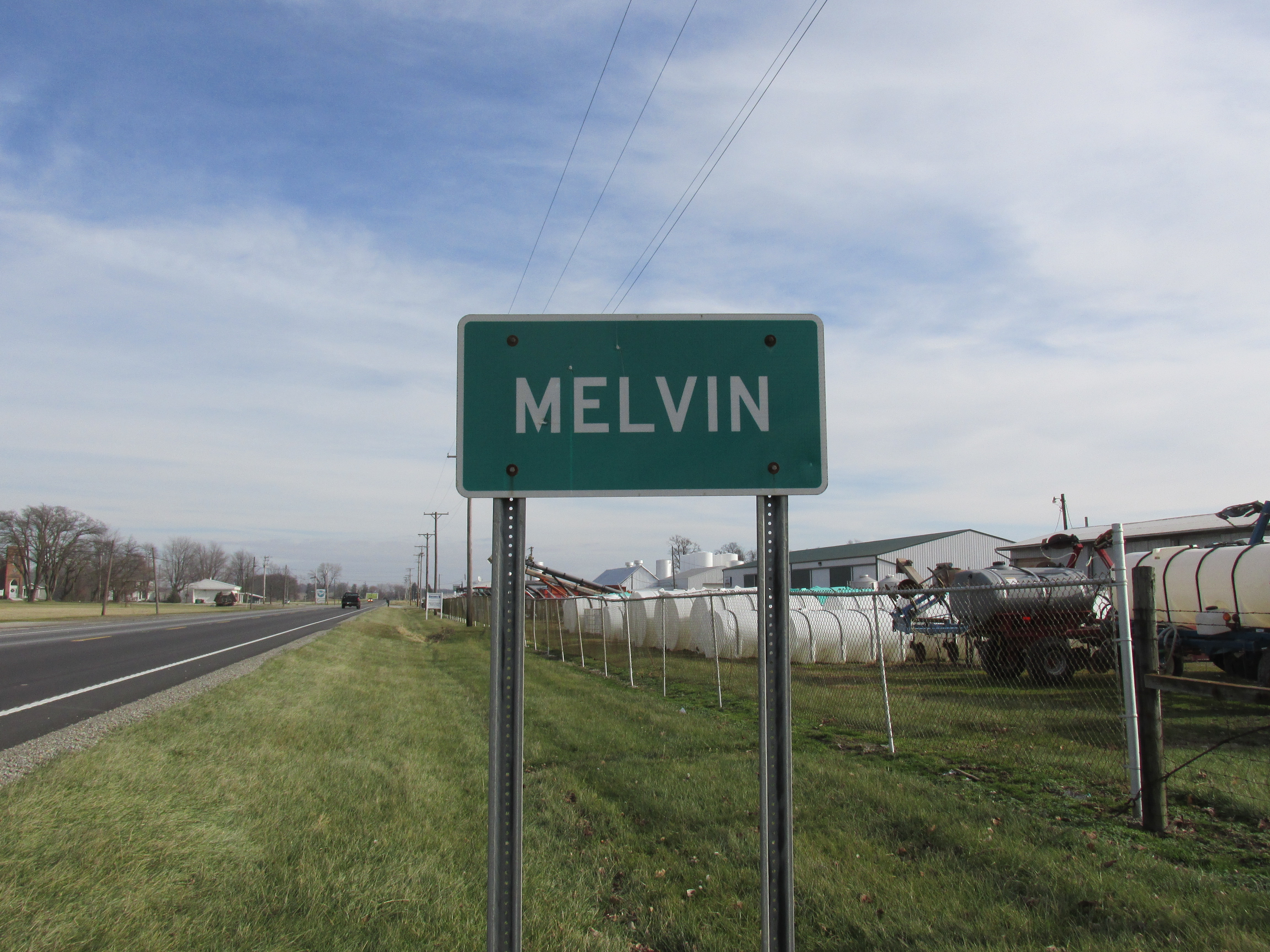
Melvin community sign

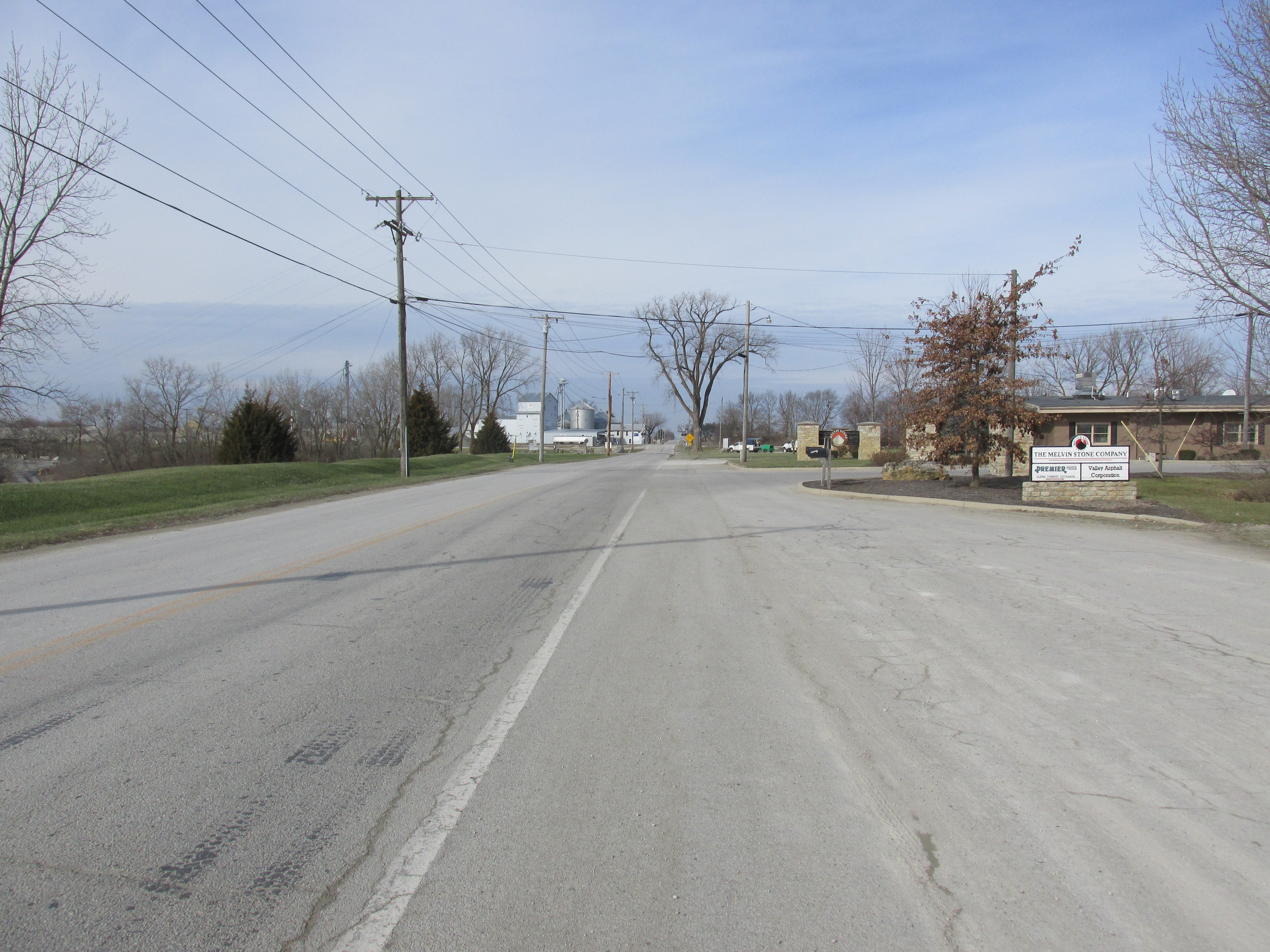
Looking northwest on Melvin Road
