= Bloomington, Ohio =

Unincorporated community in Ohio, U.S.

Coordinates: 39°32′13″N 83°42′23″W

Bloomington is an unincorporated community in Clinton County, Ohio, United States.

== History ==
Bloomington was originally called Lewisville, and under the latter name was laid out in 1842. A post office was established under the name Bloomington in 1847, and remained in operation until 1906.

== Gallery ==
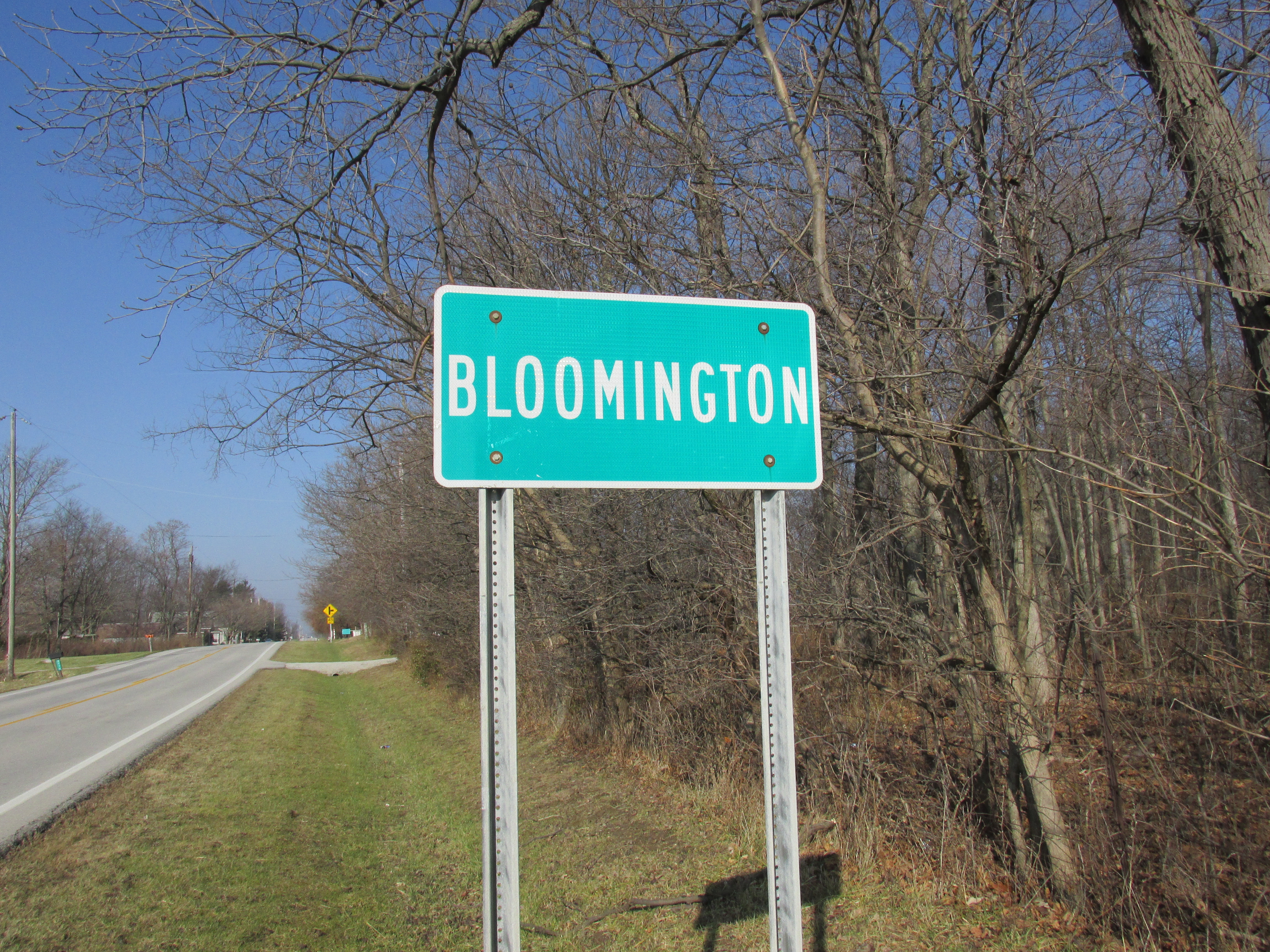
Bloomington community sign

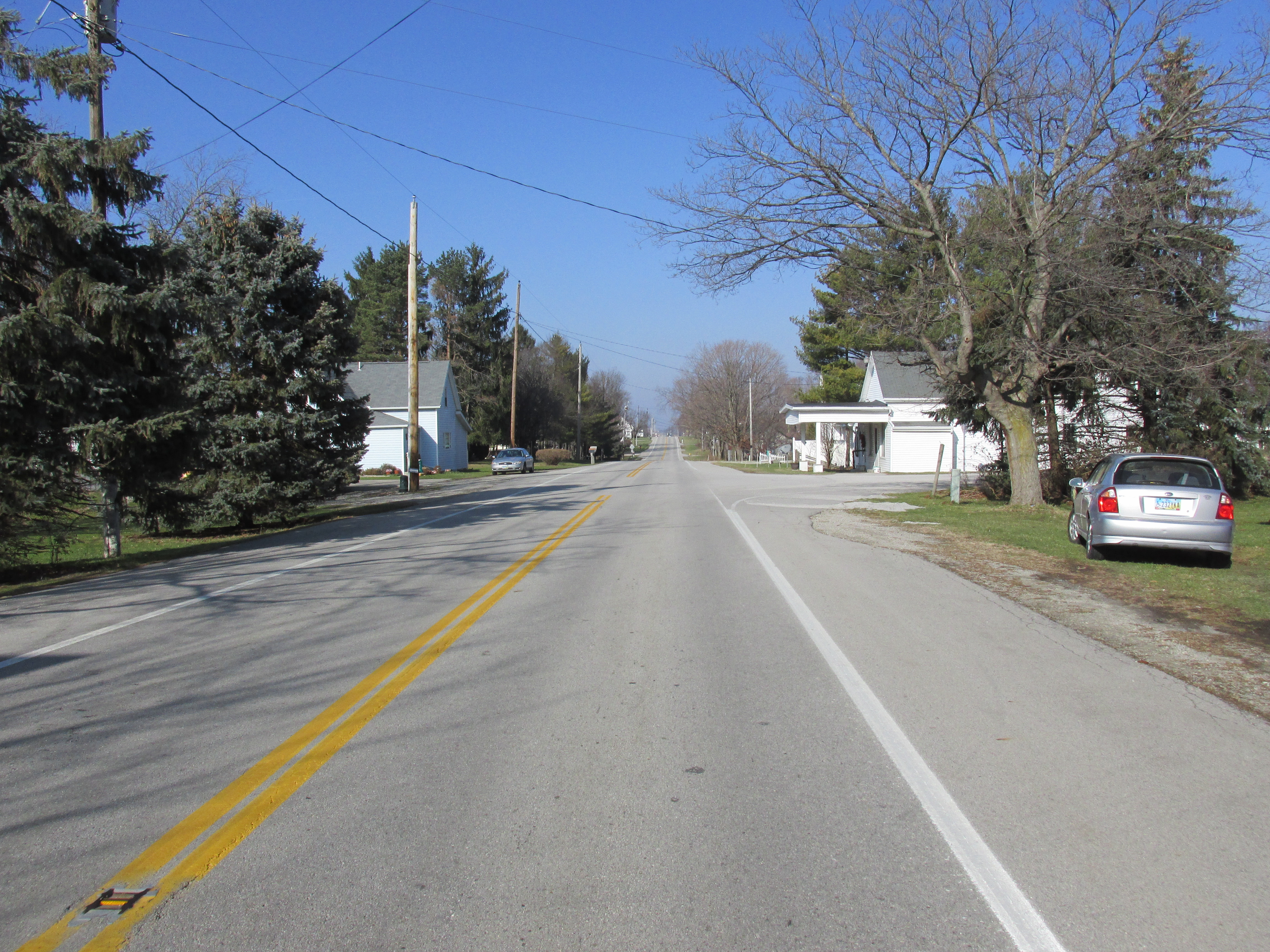
Looking north on Ohio State Route 72 in Bloomington
