= McKays, Ohio =

Community in Ohio, United States

Coordinates: 39°32′22″N 83°52′38″W

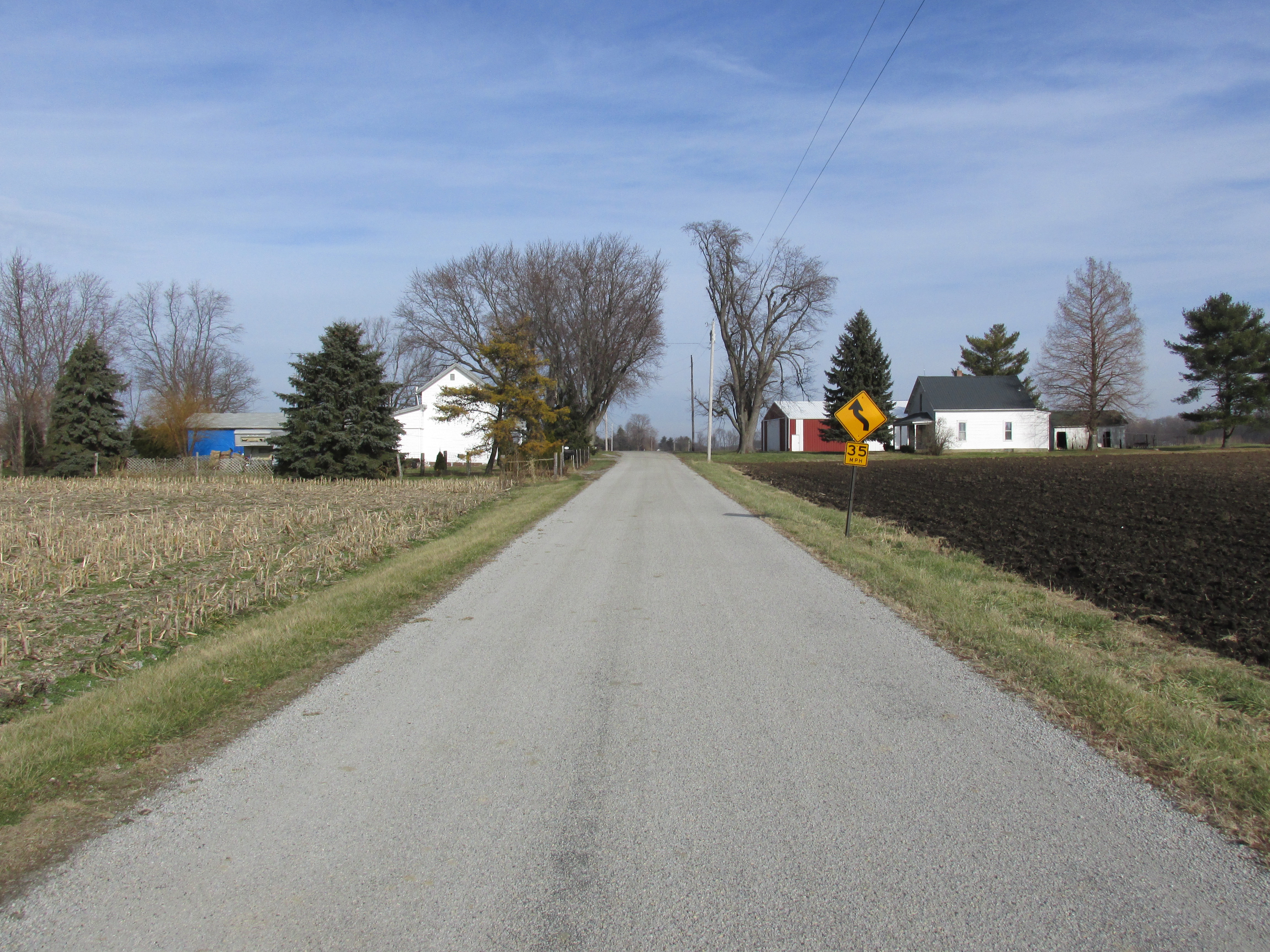
Looking north on McKay Road in McKays, Ohio.

McKays is an unincorporated community in Clinton County, Ohio, United States.

== History ==
McKays was originally known as McKay's Station, and under the latter name had its start when the railroad was extended to that point. The location was never platted but the railroad had a 21 car capacity and had 1 side track. At the location as well was a grain elevator, coal yard, log loading, stock yard and a grocery. A post office called McKays Station was established in 1878, and remained in operation until 1892. The community was named for Alfred McKay, the original owner of the town site.
