= Memphis, Ohio =

Unincorporated community in Ohio, U.S.

Coordinates: 39°24′35″N 83°36′34″W

Memphis is an unincorporated community in Clinton County, in the U.S. state of Ohio.

== History ==
A post office called Memphis was established in 1866, and remained in operation until 1902. By 1915, Memphis contained only a "cluster of houses".
