= Morrisville, Ohio =

Unincorporated community in Ohio, U.S.

Coordinates: 39°21′19″N 83°48′10″W

Morrisville is an unincorporated community located in Clinton County, Ohio, United States.

== History ==
Morrisville was laid out in 1840, and named for Isaac Morris, the original owner of the town site. A post office called Morrisville was established in 1860, and remained in operation until 1907.

== Gallery ==
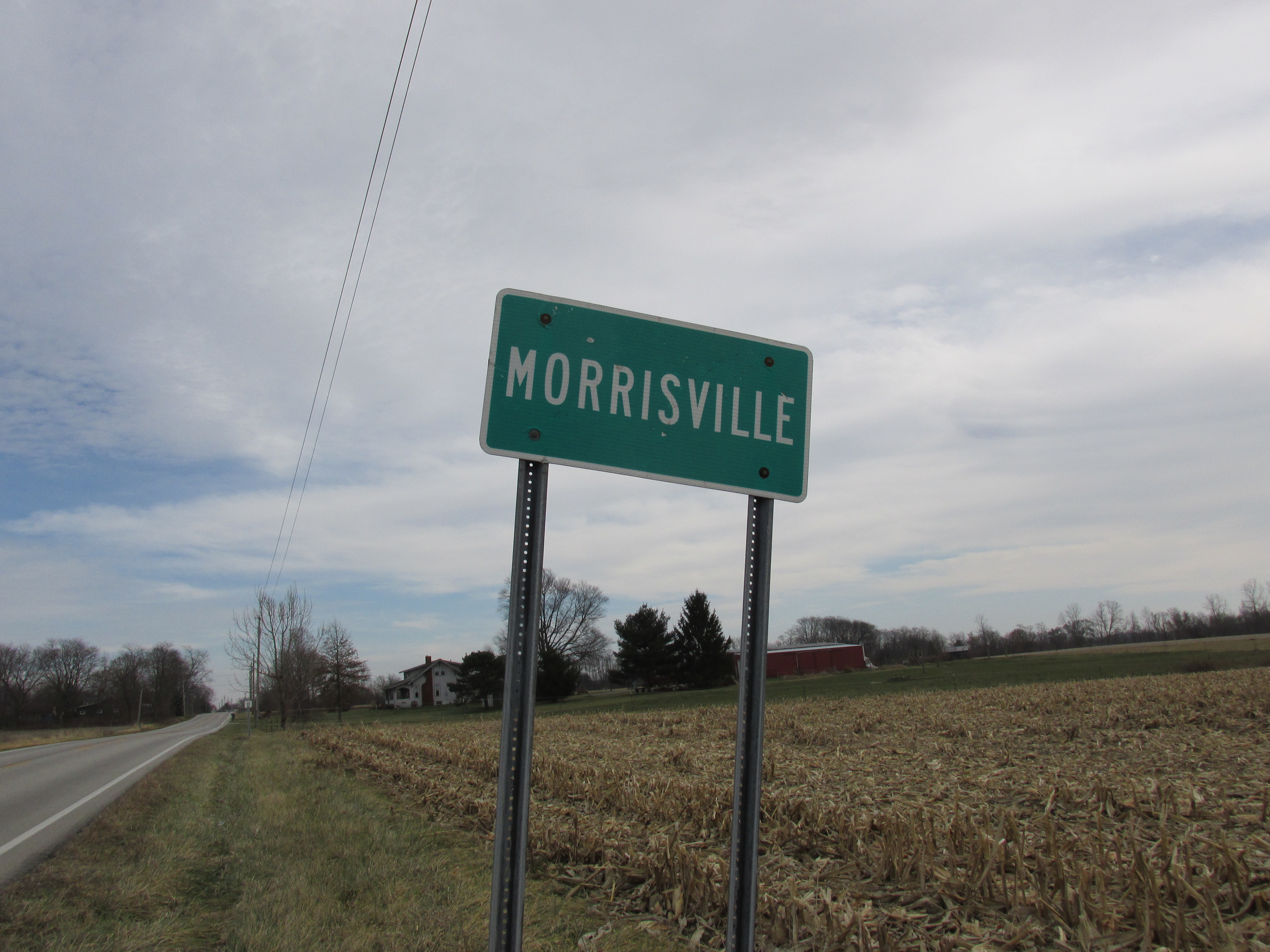
Morrisville community sign

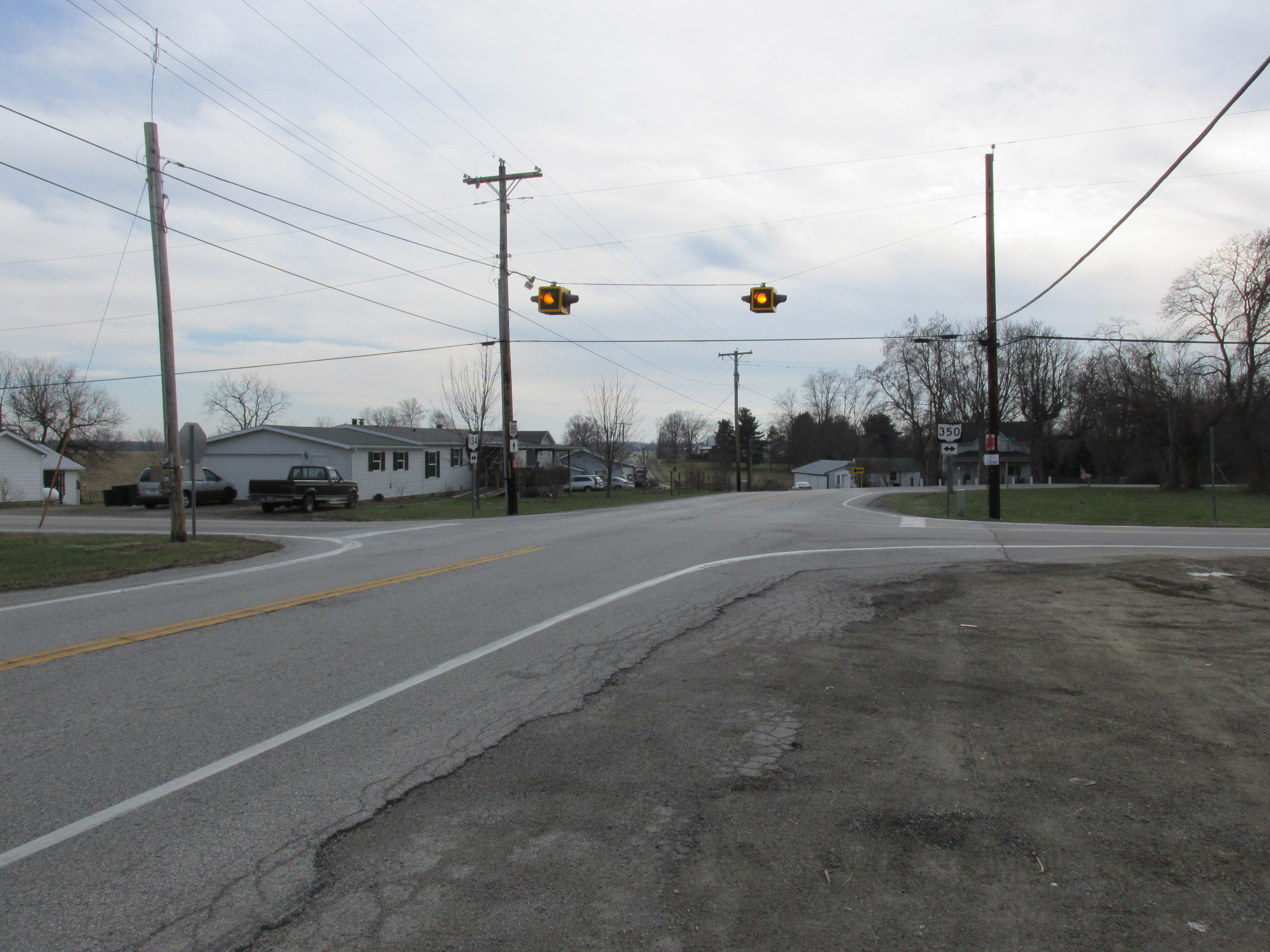
Looking south at the intersection of Ohio Highways 350 and 134
