= Lumberton, Ohio =

Coordinates: 39°33′25″N 83°50′56″W

Lumberton is an unincorporated community in Clinton County, Ohio, United States.

== History ==
The first settlement at Lumberton was made in 1820, but the town site was not platted until 1853. A post office called Lumberton was established in 1840, and remained in operation until 1907. The community was named after Lumberton, New Jersey.

== Gallery ==
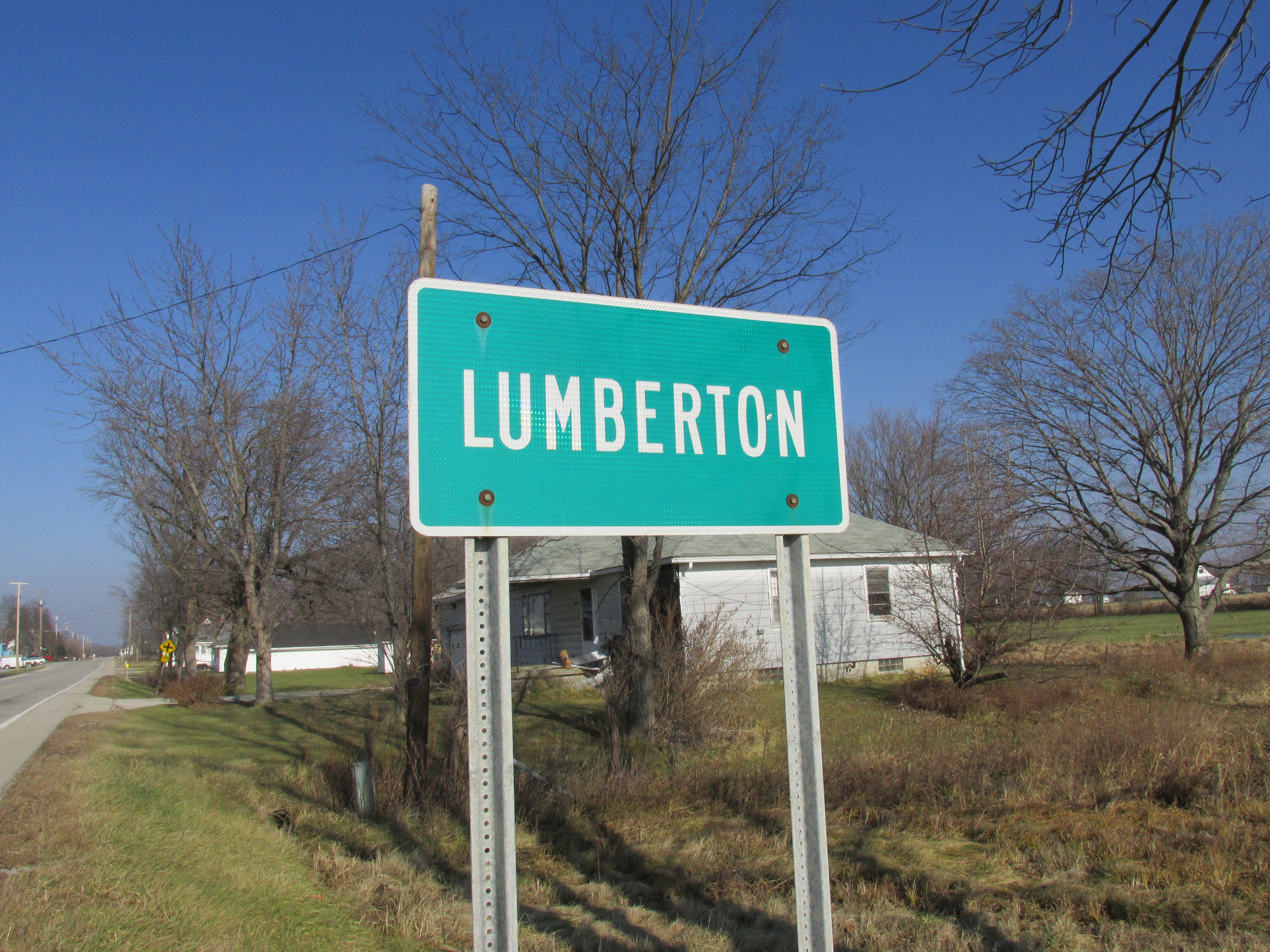
Lumberton community sign

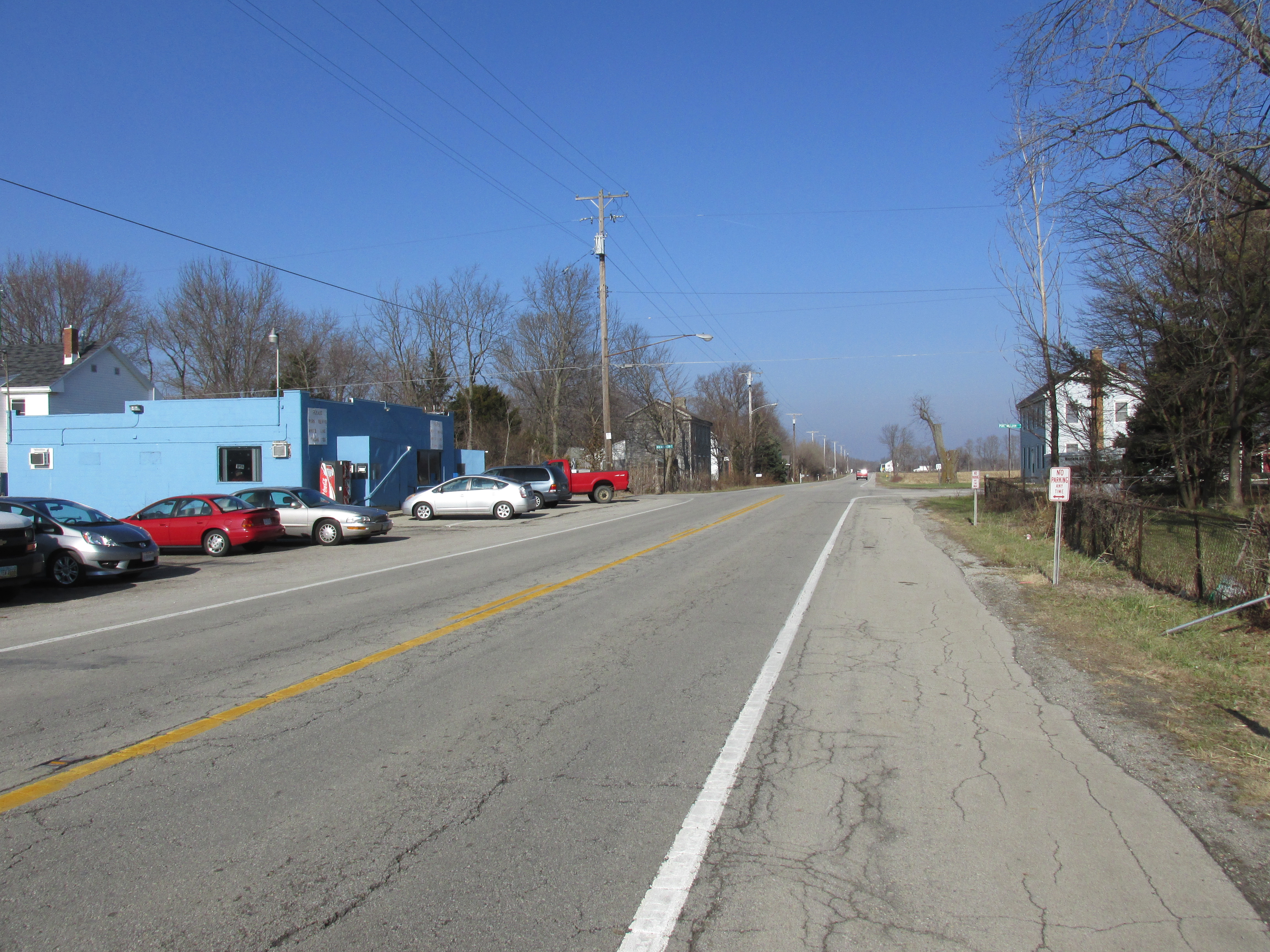
Looking north on US Highway 68 in Lumberton
