= Port William, Ohio =

- Village
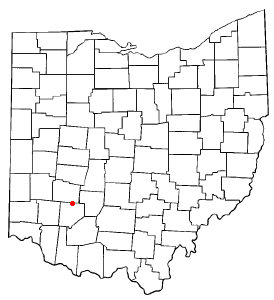
- Location of Port William, Ohio

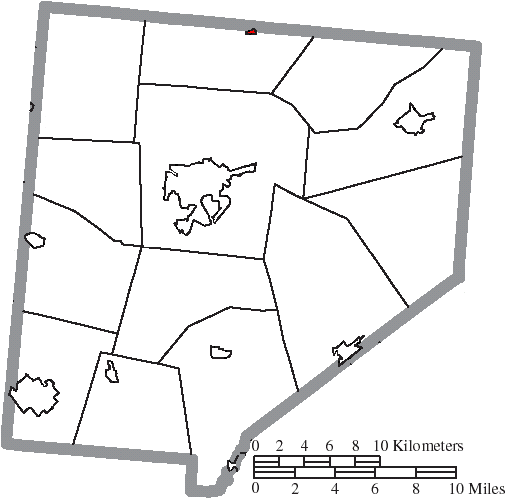
- Location of Port William in Clinton County
- Coordinates: 39°33′09″N 83°47′08″W
- Country: United States
- State: Ohio
- County: Clinton

Area
  - Total: 0.11 sq mi (0.29 km^{2})
  - Land: 0.11 sq mi (0.28 km^{2})
  - Water: 0.0039 sq mi (0.01 km^{2})
- Elevation: 1,030 ft (310 m)

Population (2020)
  - Total: 229
  - Density: 2,105.3/sq mi (812.86/km^{2})
- Time zone: UTC-5 (Eastern (EST))
  - Summer (DST): UTC-4 (EDT)
- ZIP code: 45164
- Area codes: 937, 326
- FIPS code: 39-64360
- GNIS feature ID: 2399007

Port William is a village in Clinton County, Ohio, United States. The population was 229 at the 2020 census.

== History ==
Port William was originally called West Liberty, and under the latter name was platted in 1832. A post office called Port William has been in operation since 1834.

== Geography ==
According to the United States Census Bureau, the village has a total area of 0.12 square miles (0.31 km^{2}), all land.

== Demographics ==
Historical population
Census	Pop.	Note	%±
1860	212		—
1870	184		−13.2%
1880	181		−1.6%
1890	196		8.3%
1900	200		2.0%
1910	298		49.0%
1920	294		−1.3%
1930	245		−16.7%
1940	269		9.8%
1950	352		30.9%
1960	360		2.3%
1970	323		−10.3%
1980	300		−7.1%
1990	242		−19.3%
2000	258		6.6%
2010	254		−1.6%
2020	229		−9.8%
U.S. Decennial Census

=== 2010 census ===
As of the census of 2010, there were 254 people, 97 households, and 63 families living in the village. The population density was 2,116.7 inhabitants per square mile (817.3/km^{2}). There were 113 housing units at an average density of 941.7 per square mile (363.6/km^{2}). The racial makeup of the village was 95.7% White, 1.2% African American, 2.0% Native American, 0.8% Asian, and 0.4% from two or more races. Hispanic or Latino of any race were 1.2% of the population.

There were 97 households, of which 36.1% had children under the age of 18 living with them, 43.3% were married couples living together, 14.4% had a female householder with no husband present, 7.2% had a male householder with no wife present, and 35.1% were non-families. 27.8% of all households were made up of individuals, and 7.2% had someone living alone who was 65 years of age or older. The average household size was 2.62 and the average family size was 3.17.

The median age in the village was 35.6 years. 29.5% of residents were under the age of 18; 7.5% were between the ages of 18 and 24; 27.2% were from 25 to 44; 28% were from 45 to 64; and 7.9% were 65 years of age or older. The gender makeup of the village was 49.2% male and 50.8% female.

=== 2000 census ===
As of the census of 2000, there were 258 people, 97 households, and 64 families living in the village. The population density was 2,222.6 inhabitants per square mile (858.2/km^{2}). There were 107 housing units at an average density of 921.8 per square mile (355.9/km^{2}). The racial makeup of the village was 95.74% White, 3.49% Native American, and 0.78% from two or more races. Hispanic or Latino of any race were 1.55% of the population.

There were 97 households, out of which 41.2% had children under the age of 18 living with them, 48.5% were married couples living together, 9.3% had a female householder with no husband present, and 33.0% were non-families. 19.6% of all households were made up of individuals, and 8.2% had someone living alone who was 65 years of age or older. The average household size was 2.66 and the average family size was 3.17.

In the village, the population was spread out, with 31.0% under the age of 18, 8.1% from 18 to 24, 36.8% from 25 to 44, 16.3% from 45 to 64, and 7.8% who were 65 years of age or older. The median age was 30 years. For every 100 females there were 111.5 males. For every 100 females age 18 and over, there were 102.3 males.

The median income for a household in the village was $33,264, and the median income for a family was $34,141. Males had a median income of $33,269 versus $20,000 for females. The per capita income for the village was $13,888. About 10.1% of families and 16.0% of the population were below the poverty line, including 26.8% of those under the age of eighteen and 23.8% of those 65 or over.

== Gallery ==
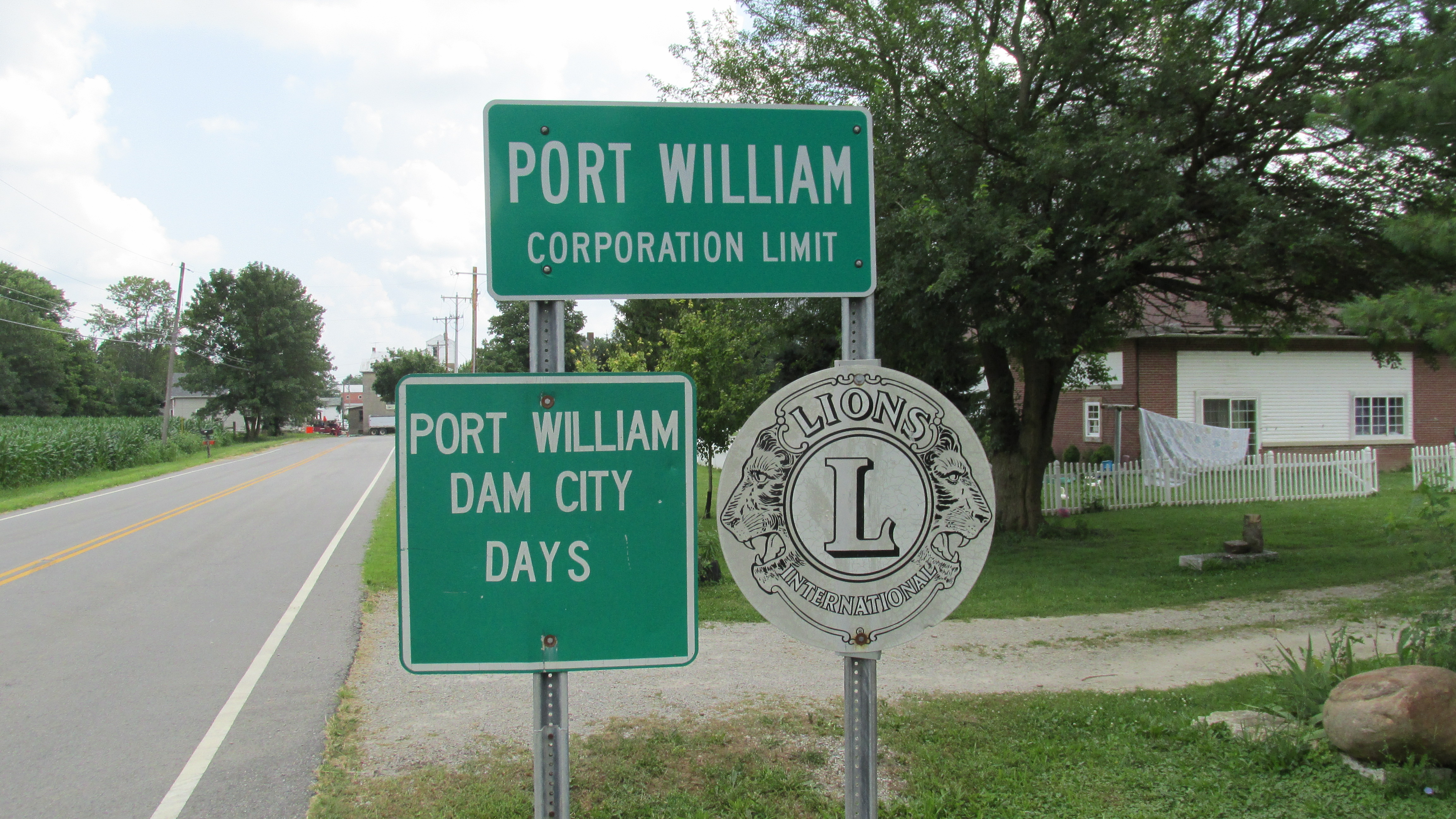
Port William corporation limit sign

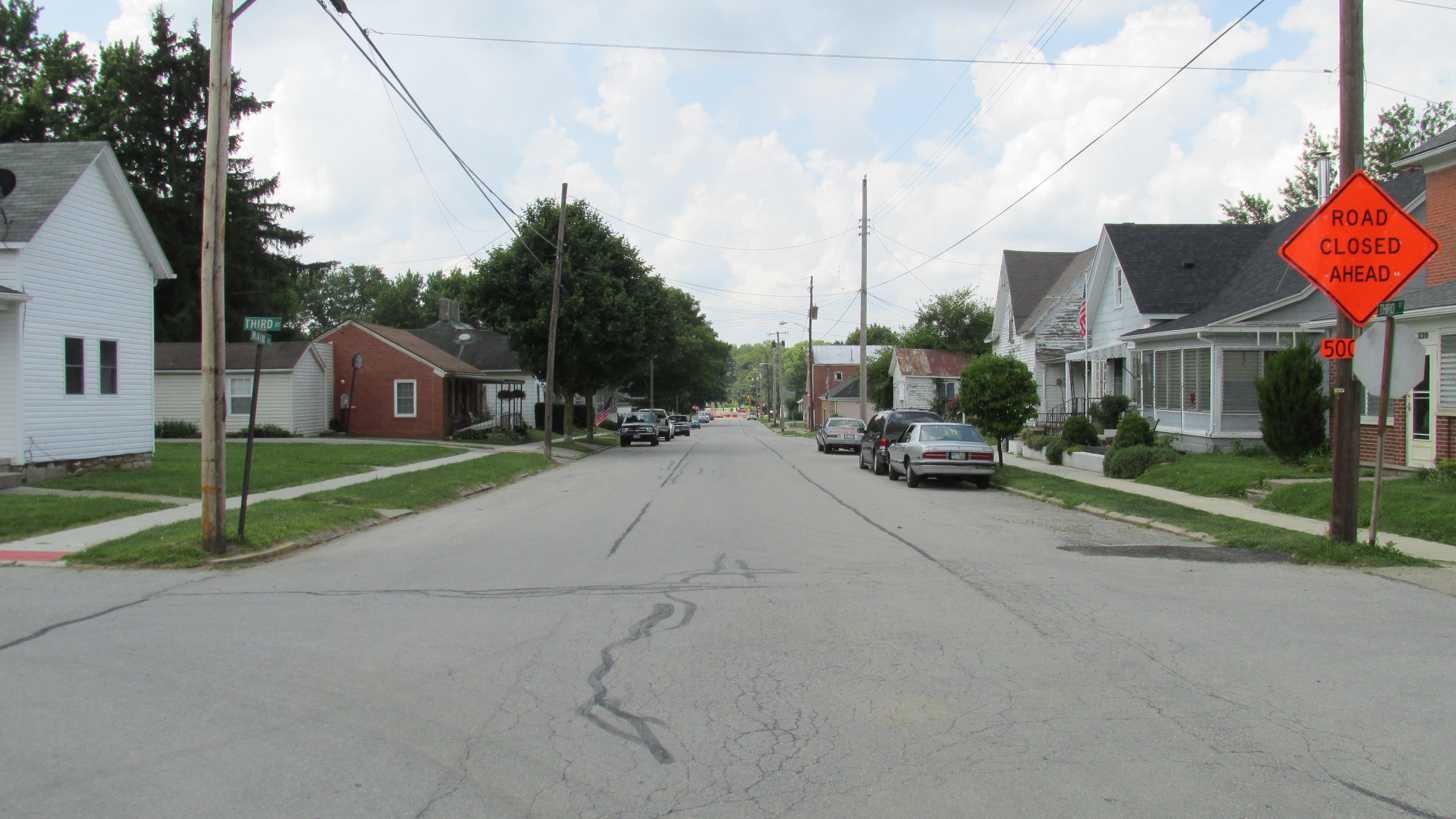
Looking southwest on Main Street in Port William
