= Clinton Field =

Airport in Clinton County, Ohio, US

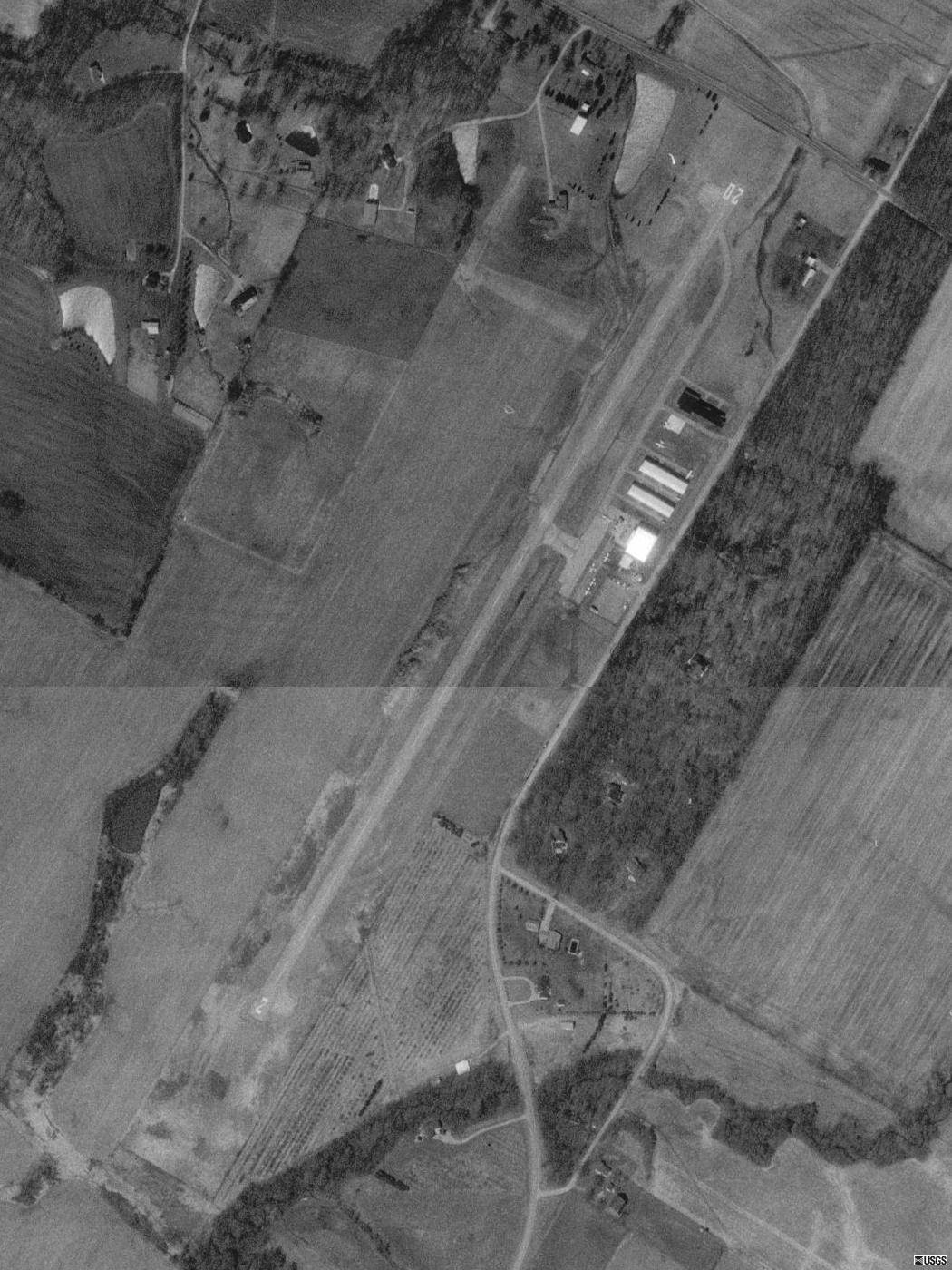
- USGS aerial image as of 22 March 1994
- IATA: none; ICAO: none; FAA LID: I66

Summary
- Airport type: Public
- Owner: Clinton County Board of Commissioners
- Serves: Clinton County, Ohio
- Location: Wilmington, Ohio
- Elevation AMSL: 1,033 ft (315 m)
- Coordinates: 39°30′09″N 083°51′48″W

Map
- Location of airport in Ohio I66 (the United States)

Runways
Direction	Length		Surface
Direction	ft	m	Surface
3/21	3,579	1,091	Asphalt

Statistics (2022)
- Aircraft operations (year ending 8/24/2022): 27,010
- Based aircraft: 27
- Source: Federal Aviation Administration

Clinton Field (FAA LID: I66) is a public use airport located four nautical miles (7 km) northwest of the central business district of Wilmington, a city in Clinton County, Ohio, United States. It is owned by the Clinton County Board of Commissioners. This airport is included in the FAA's National Plan of Integrated Airport Systems (2009–2013), which categorizes it as a general aviation facility.

== History ==
Planning for the airport began in February 1966 and a 47-acre (19 ha) site on land belonging to Richard Grant was approved on 12 May 1967. A fundraising effort begun three days after the announcement raised the $23,500 necessary to buy the land on May 22nd. Using a $100,000 state grant, the county accepted bids from two companies to build a 3,700-foot (1,100 m) runway in late June 1967. (Note: This occurred two days before a deadline to purchase the land to be eligible for the grant.) The following day a third contract for installation of lighting was awarded. As this brought the total cost to more than the amount of the grant, the chamber of commerce paid for the remaining roughly $4,400 balance. The airport was opened in October 1968 and dedicated on 2 November 1969. Maintenance and t-hangars were in use in July 1970. A 1,280-square-foot (119 m^{2}) terminal building and 1,130-foot (340 m) taxiway were under construction by late August 1970. By late November 1971, the only cost to the county was operating the runway lights and companies such as Cincinnati Milacron were using the airport. The Clinton Aviation Organization was established at the airport in March 1972.

A new fixed-base operator, John Toomey, began managing the airport in March 1980.

An offer to buy the airport for $300,000 by a local resident, John Schweller, was rejected by the county in September 1986. A regional airport authority took over control of the airport from the airport advisory board in 1988. The airport received a grant to lengthen its taxiway by 2,000-foot (610 m) in 1990.

Construction of a 250-foot (76 m) to 300-foot (91 m) extension of the runway was anticipated to begin in 2000. Two proposals to build a total of 57 homes on land adjacent to the airport were made in 2002. At least one of the two would be a fly-in community. Later that year, consideration was given to a future runway extension.

== Facilities and aircraft ==
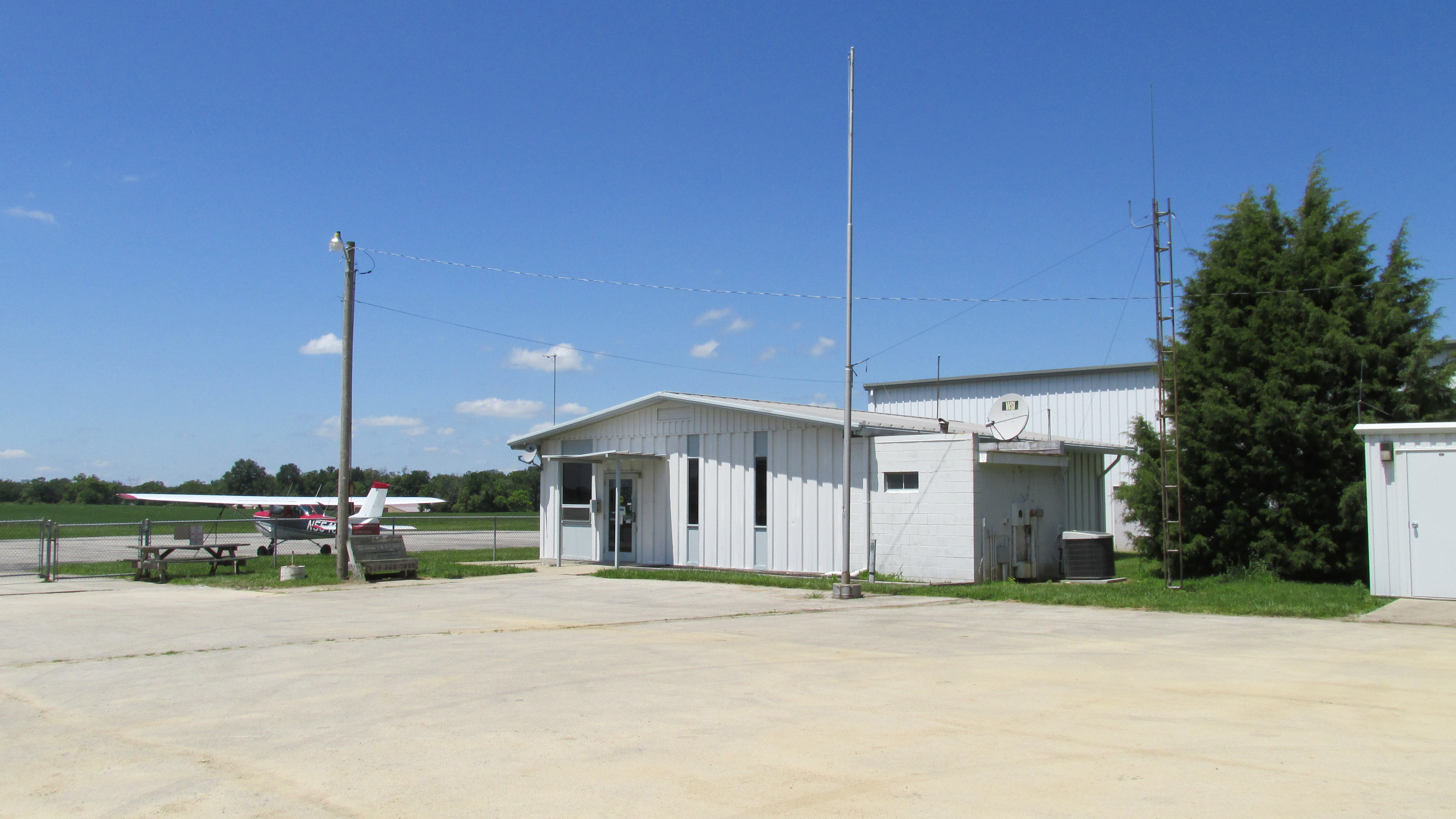
Terminal Building at Clinton Field

Clinton Field covers an area of 54 acres (22 ha) at an elevation of 1,033 feet (315 m) above mean sea level. It has one runway designated 3/21 with an asphalt surface measuring 3,579 by 60 feet (1,091 x 18 m). During May through September, the airport is attended from 08:00 to 20:00. During October through April, it is attended from 08:00 to 17:00. The fixed-base operator (FBO) offers services such as rental cars and hangar space as well as amenities like internet, conference rooms, vending machines, and a crew lounge.

For the 12-month period ending August 24, 2022, the airport had 27,010 aircraft operations, an average of 74 per day: 98% general aviation, 2% air taxi and less than 1% military. At that time there were 27 aircraft based at this airport, 25 single-engine, and 2 multi-engine

== Accidents and incidents ==
- On 30 May 1989, a Piper Cherokee crashed due to fuel exhaustion while attempting to land at the airport, killing three occupants and seriously injuring one.
- On March 11, 1995, a Piper PA-28 was damaged during a go-around at the Clinton County Airport. While on approach, the pilot reported that the plane was sinking faster than he expected, so he attempted a go-around. While transitioning into the climb, the airplane's landing gear struck a snow bank. During the subsequent emergency landing, the right main gear collapsed, the airplane turned to the right and went off the right side of the runway. The probable cause of the accident was found to be the pilot's failure to maintain adequate terrain clearance during a go around; a factor is the pilot's delay in initiating a go around.
- On October 15, 2016, a Luscombe 8 crashed while landing at the Clinton County Airport. After touchdown, the airplane began to porpoise, and the pilot held the stick back. After a few porpoises, the airplane veered to the left; the pilot tried correcting with opposite rudder, but the airplane exited the runway surface. The airplane hit a ditch and became airborne; the pilot tried to add power to go around, but the airplane didn't climb. With trees approaching, the pilot subsequently landed the airplane. The probable cause of the accident was found to be the pilot's improper landing flare, which resulted in a bounced landing, and his subsequent failure to maintain directional control, which resulted in a runway excursion.

== See also ==
- List of airports in Ohio
