= Farmers, Ohio =

Unincorporated community in Ohio, U.S.

Coordinates: 39°19′18″N 83°45′49″W

Farmers is an unincorporated community in Clinton County, in the U.S. state of Ohio.

== History ==
A former variant name was Farmers Station. Farmers Station had its start when the railroad was extended to that point but the town site was not officially platted. A post office called Farmers Station was established in 1859, and remained in operation until 1910.
