= Kingman, Ohio =

Unincorporated community in Ohio, U.S.

Coordinates: 39°30′03″N 83°56′24″W

Kingman is an unincorporated community in Clinton County, in the U.S. state of Ohio. Nearby North Kingman is also listed by the GNIS as a populated place.

== History ==
Kingman had its start when the railroad was extended to that point. A post office called Kingman was established in 1894, and remained in operation until 1905.
