= Jonesboro, Ohio =

Unincorporated community in Ohio, U.S.

Coordinates: 39°18′7″N 83°49′30″W

Jonesboro (/ˈdʒoʊnzbʌrə/) is an unincorporated community in Clinton County, in the U.S. state of Ohio.

== History ==
Located just south of Martinsville in Clark Township, Jonesboro was not officially platted.
