= Martinsville, Ohio =

- Village
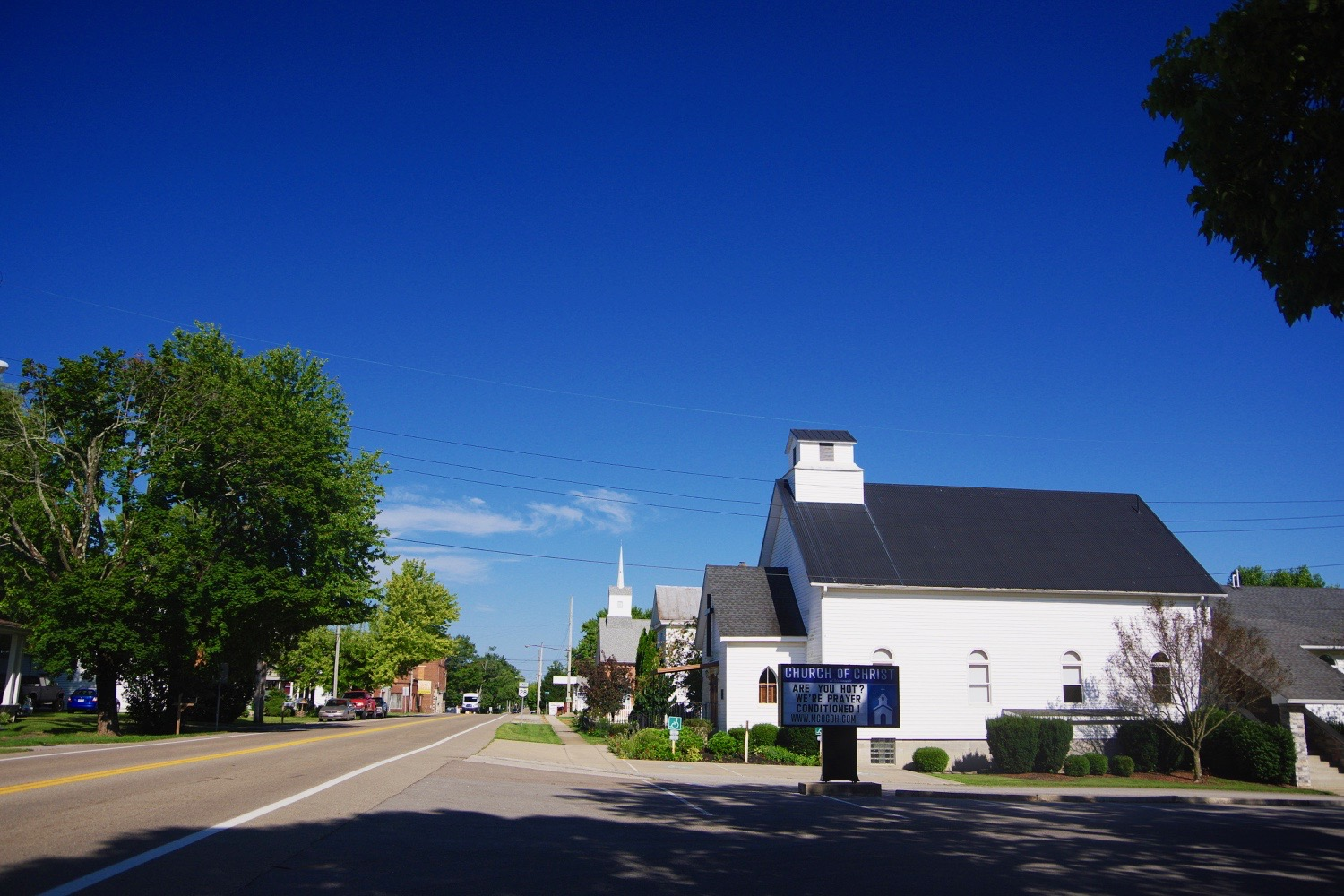
- Main Street (SR 28)

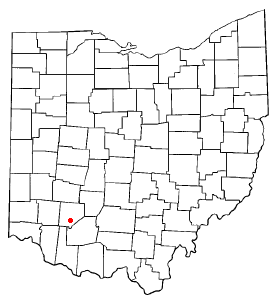
- Location of Martinsville, Ohio

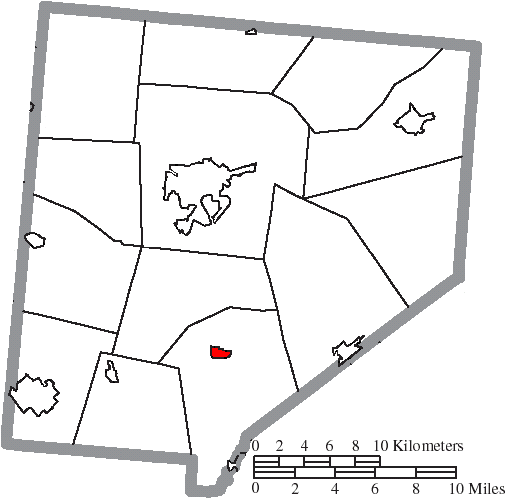
- Location of Martinsville in Clinton County
- Coordinates: 39°19′22″N 83°48′42″W
- Country: United States
- State: Ohio
- County: Clinton

Government
  - Mayor: Jedidiah Mountjoy

Area
  - Total: 0.37 sq mi (0.96 km^{2})
  - Land: 0.37 sq mi (0.96 km^{2})
  - Water: 0 sq mi (0.00 km^{2})
- Elevation: 1,093 ft (333 m)

Population (2020)
  - Total: 416
  - Density: 1,128.3/sq mi (435.62/km^{2})
- Time zone: UTC-5 (Eastern (EST))
  - Summer (DST): UTC-4 (EDT)
- ZIP code: 45146
- Area codes: 937, 326
- FIPS code: 39-48118
- GNIS feature ID: 2399267

Martinsville is a village in Clinton County, Ohio, United States. The population was 416 at the 2020 census.

== History ==
Martinsville was platted in 1816. By 1833, Martinsville had 75 inhabitants.

In 2013, prosecutors charged a former Martinsville council president and a village administrator with stealing more than $100,000 from the village.

== Geography ==
Martinsville lies along State Route 28 west of New Vienna and east of Midland. SR 28 intersects SR 134 just east of Martinsville, connecting the area to Wilmington a few miles to the north.

According to the United States Census Bureau, the village has a total area of 0.44 square miles (1.14 km^{2}), all land.

== Demographics ==
Historical population
Census	Pop.	Note	%±
1860	293		—
1870	264		−9.9%
1880	355		34.5%
1890	336		−5.4%
1900	338		0.6%
1910	334		−1.2%
1920	397		18.9%
1930	369		−7.1%
1940	409		10.8%
1950	399		−2.4%
1960	488		22.3%
1970	500		2.5%
1980	539		7.8%
1990	476		−11.7%
2000	440		−7.6%
2010	463		5.2%
2020	416		−10.2%
U.S. Decennial Census

=== 2010 census ===
As of the census of 2010, there were 463 people, 149 households, and 118 families living in the village. The population density was 1,052.3 inhabitants per square mile (406.3/km^{2}). There were 166 housing units at an average density of 377.3 per square mile (145.7/km^{2}). The racial makeup of the village was 96.1% White, 1.3% African American, 0.2% Asian, and 2.4% from other races. Hispanic or Latino of any race were 2.8% of the population.

There were 149 households, of which 44.3% had children under the age of 18 living with them, 52.3% were married couples living together, 16.8% had a female householder with no husband present, 10.1% had a male householder with no wife present, and 20.8% were non-families. 15.4% of all households were made up of individuals, and 6.7% had someone living alone who was 65 years of age or older. The average household size was 3.11 and the average family size was 3.34.

The median age in the village was 32.8 years. 32.4% of residents were under the age of 18; 8.5% were between the ages of 18 and 24; 24.8% were from 25 to 44; 22.3% were from 45 to 64; and 12.1% were 65 years of age or older. The gender makeup of the village was 49.7% male and 50.3% female.

=== 2000 census ===
As of the census of 2000, there were 440 people, 160 households, and 127 families living in the village. The population density was 996.4 inhabitants per square mile (384.7/km^{2}). There were 169 housing units at an average density of 382.7 per square mile (147.8/km^{2}). The racial makeup of the village was 96.36% White, 0.91% African American, 0.45% Native American, 0.23% Asian, 0.45% from other races, and 1.59% from two or more races. Hispanic or Latino of any race were 0.23% of the population.

There were 160 households, out of which 33.8% had children under the age of 18 living with them, 59.4% were married couples living together, 11.9% had a female householder with no husband present, and 20.6% were non-families. 17.5% of all households were made up of individuals, and 9.4% had someone living alone who was 65 years of age or older. The average household size was 2.75 and the average family size was 3.06.

In the village, the population was spread out, with 27.5% under the age of 18, 10.0% from 18 to 24, 28.9% from 25 to 44, 24.3% from 45 to 64, and 9.3% who were 65 years of age or older. The median age was 35 years. For every 100 females there were 97.3 males. For every 100 females age 18 and over, there were 96.9 males.

The median income for a household in the village was $36,000, and the median income for a family was $38,750. Males had a median income of $26,406 versus $20,000 for females. The per capita income for the village was $13,288. About 9.4% of families and 8.5% of the population were below the poverty line, including 7.6% of those under age 18 and 21.3% of those age 65 or over.
