= Gurneyville, Ohio =

- Unincorporated community
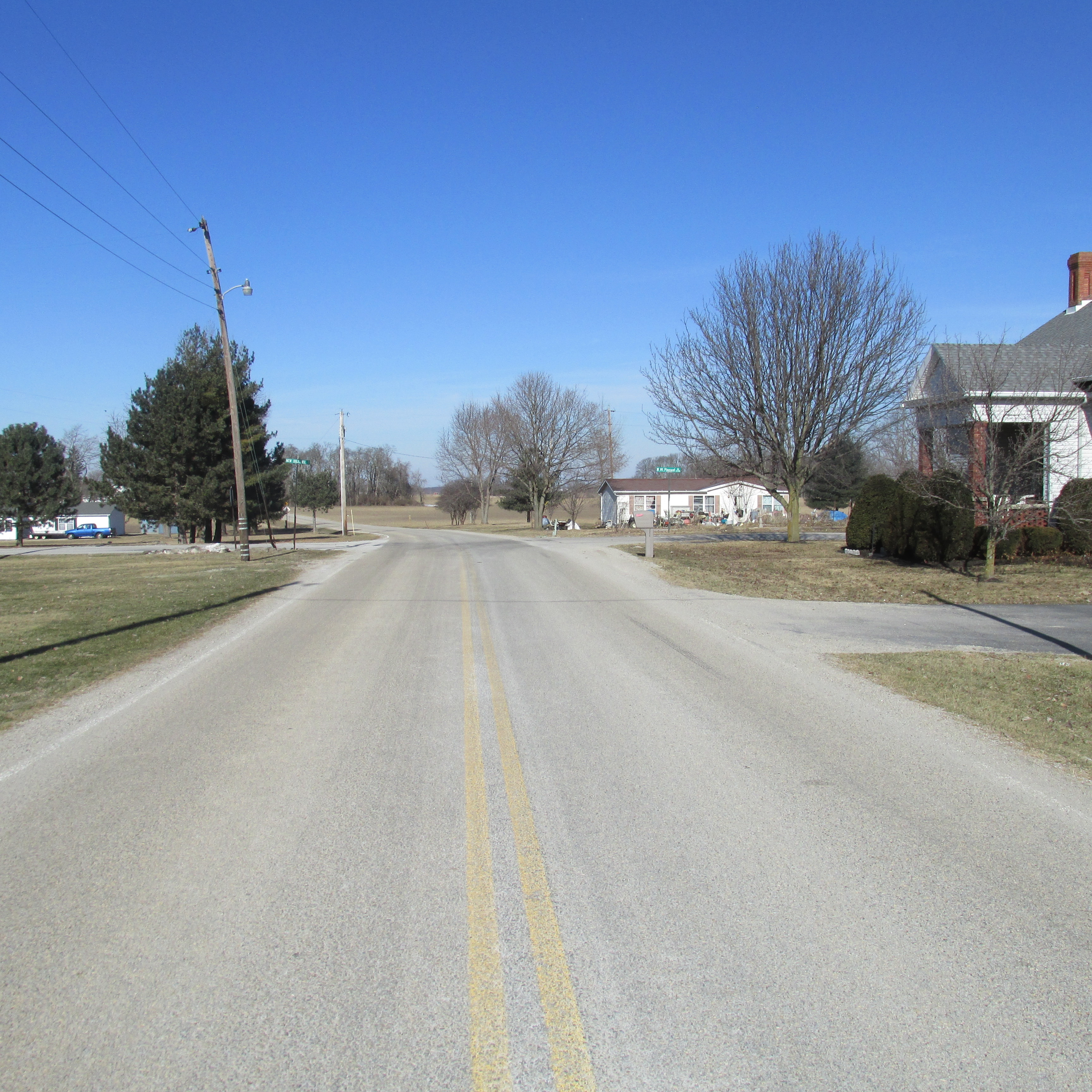
- Looking northwest at the intersection of Gurneyville Road and West Mt. Pleasant/New Oglesbee roads in Gurneyville

- Location within Ohio Location within the United States
- Coordinates: 39°30′53″N 83°52′37″W
- Country: United States
- State: Ohio
- County: Clinton
- Elevation: 1,056 ft (322 m)
- Time zone: UTC-5 (Eastern (EST))
  - Summer (DST): UTC-4 (EDT)
- Area codes: 937, 326
- GNIS feature ID: 1064777

Gurneyville (also Guerneyville) is an unincorporated community, in Clinton County, Ohio, United States.

== History ==
Gurneyville was platted in 1847, and named for Joseph John Gurney, a prominent local Quaker. A post office called Gurneyville was established in 1875, and remained in operation until 1905.

== Notable person ==
- Francis A. Wallar, Medal of Honor recipient
