= Sligo, Ohio =

Coordinates: 39°26′30″N 83°55′13″W

Sligo is an unincorporated community in Adams Township, Clinton County, Ohio, United States.

== History ==
A post office called Sligo was established in 1844, and remained in operation until 1865. The community was named after the Sligo Iron Works in Pittsburgh, a favorite brand of 19th-century blacksmiths.

== Gallery ==
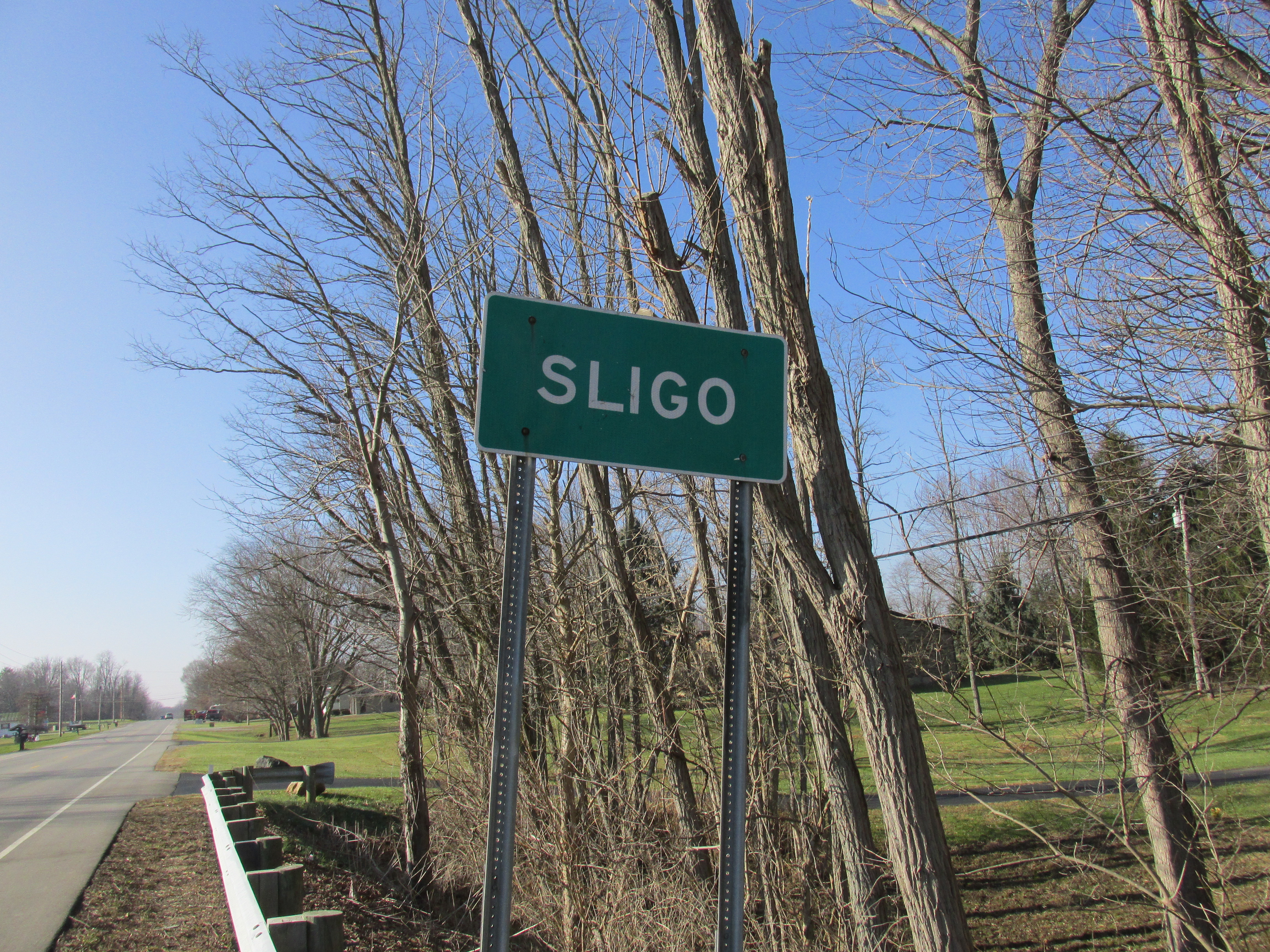
Sligo community sign

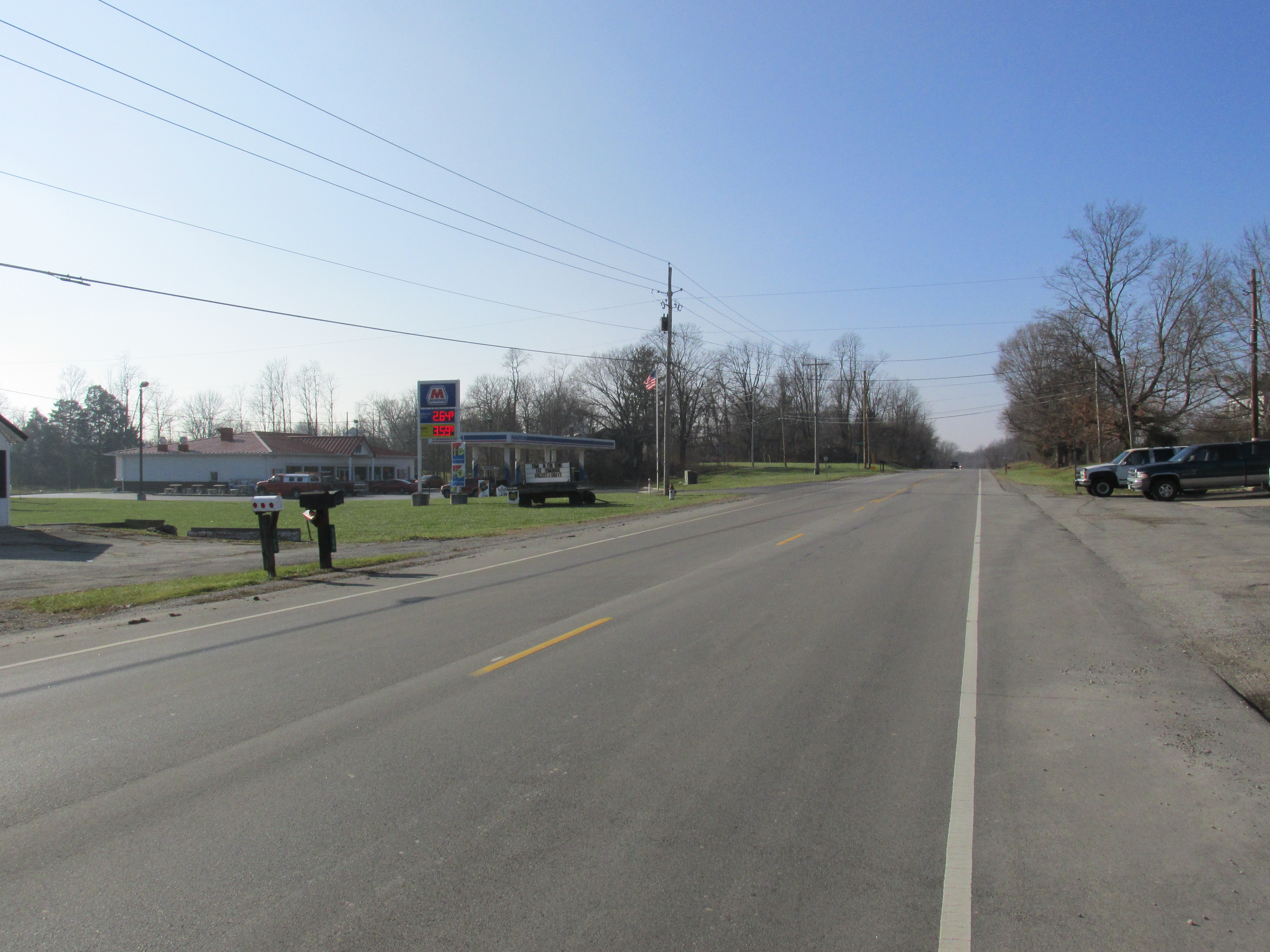
Looking west on US 22 in Sligo
