= Westboro, Ohio =

Unincorporated community in Ohio, U.S.

Coordinates: 39°16′53″N 83°54′38″W

Westboro is an unincorporated community in Jefferson Township, Clinton County, Ohio, United States.

== History ==
Westboro was platted in 1838. The community may derive its name from nearby West Fork Creek. A post office was established at Westboro in 1847, and remained in operation until 1971.

== Gallery ==
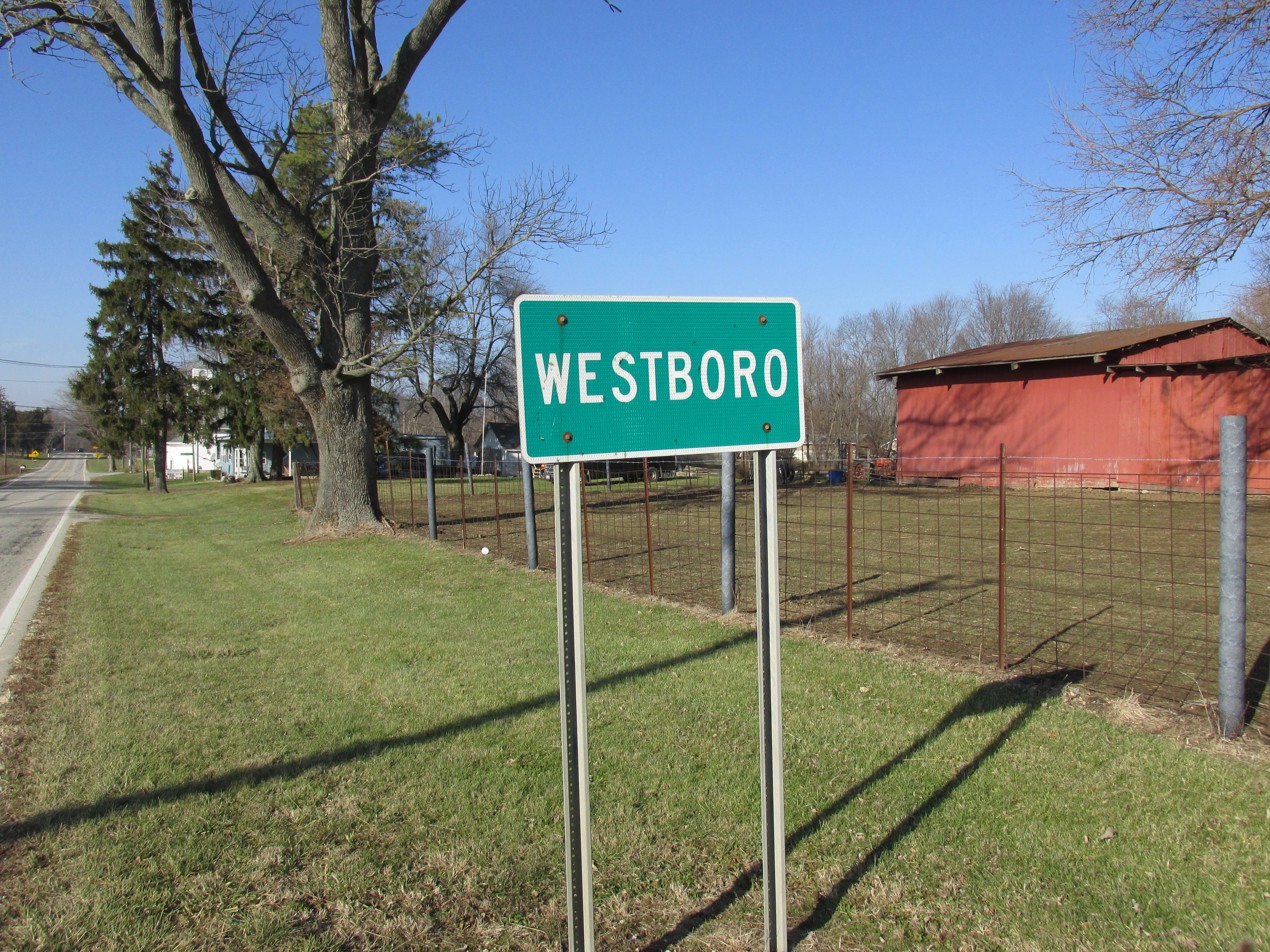
Westboro community sign

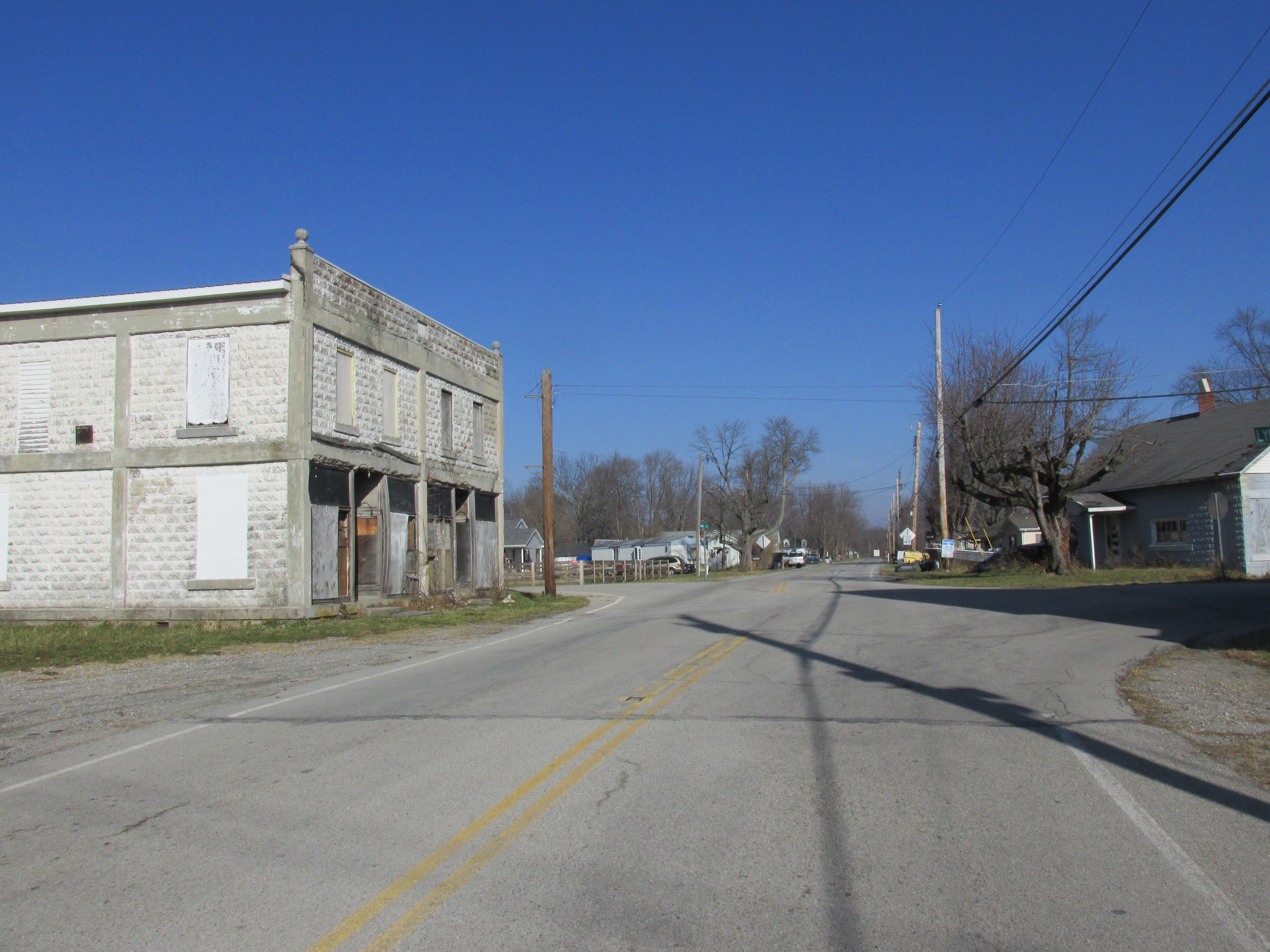
Looking northeast on Main Street (Jonesboro Road) in Westboro
