= Burtonsville, Alberta =

Coordinates: 53.3378°N 114.5134°W

Burtonsville is a locality in Alberta, Canada.

C. Burton, an early postmaster, gave the locality his last name.
