= Midland, Ohio =

- Village
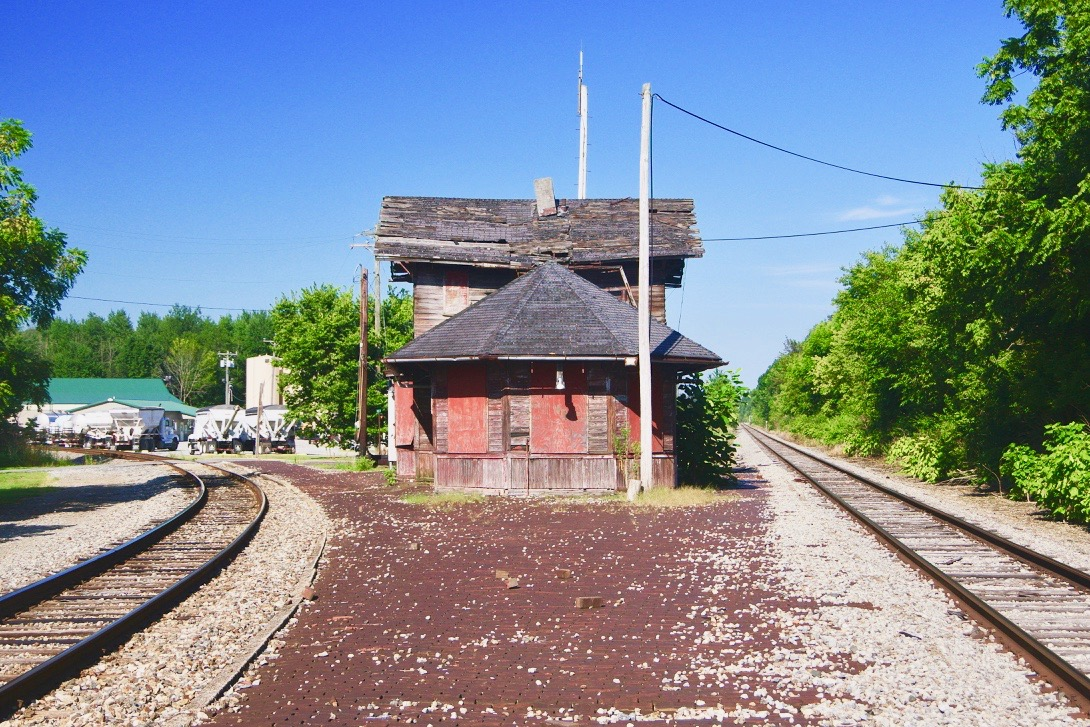
- Former B&O train station in Midland

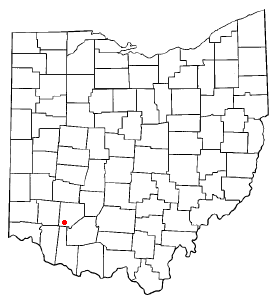
- Location of Midland, Ohio

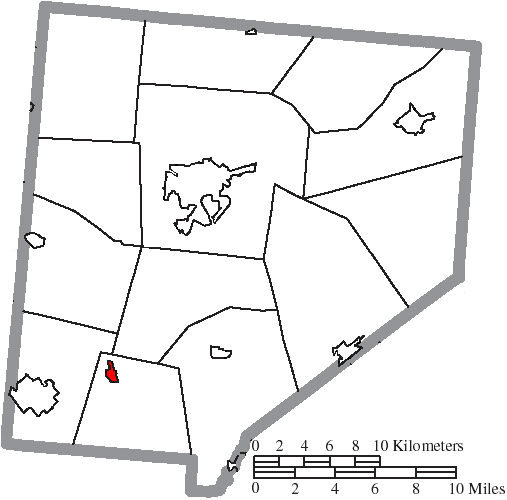
- Location of Midland in Clinton County
- Coordinates: 39°18′25″N 83°54′39″W
- Country: United States
- State: Ohio
- County: Clinton

Area
  - Total: 0.36 sq mi (0.92 km^{2})
  - Land: 0.36 sq mi (0.92 km^{2})
  - Water: 0 sq mi (0.00 km^{2})
- Elevation: 988 ft (301 m)

Population (2020)
  - Total: 307
  - Density: 861.8/sq mi (332.74/km^{2})
- Time zone: UTC-5 (Eastern (EST))
  - Summer (DST): UTC-4 (EDT)
- ZIP code: 45148
- Area codes: 937, 326
- FIPS code: 39-49896
- GNIS feature ID: 2399336

Midland is a village in Clinton County, Ohio, United States. The population was 307 at the 2020 census.

== History ==
Midland was originally called Clinton Valley.

== Geography ==
According to the United States Census Bureau, the village has a total area of 0.35 square miles (0.91 km^{2}), all land.

== Demographics ==
Historical population
Census	Pop.	Note	%±
1890	328		—
1900	338		3.0%
1910	327		−3.3%
1920	312		−4.6%
1930	297		−4.8%
1940	285		−4.0%
1950	338		18.6%
1960	367		8.6%
1970	388		5.7%
1980	365		−5.9%
1990	319		−12.6%
2000	265		−16.9%
2010	315		18.9%
2020	307		−2.5%
U.S. Decennial Census

=== 2010 census ===
As of the census of 2010, there were 315 people, 109 households, and 76 families living in the village. The population density was 900.0 inhabitants per square mile (347.5/km^{2}). There were 128 housing units at an average density of 365.7 per square mile (141.2/km^{2}). The racial makeup of the village was 96.2% White, 1.0% African American, and 2.9% from two or more races.

There were 109 households, of which 41.3% had children under the age of 18 living with them, 42.2% were married couples living together, 18.3% had a female householder with no husband present, 9.2% had a male householder with no wife present, and 30.3% were non-families. 25.7% of all households were made up of individuals, and 5.6% had someone living alone who was 65 years of age or older. The average household size was 2.89 and the average family size was 3.45.

The median age in the village was 28.6 years. 29.8% of residents were under the age of 18; 14.6% were between the ages of 18 and 24; 26.3% were from 25 to 44; 23.8% were from 45 to 64; and 5.4% were 65 years of age or older. The gender makeup of the village was 47.9% male and 52.1% female.

=== 2000 census ===
As of the census of 2000, there were 265 people, 98 households, and 77 families living in the village. The population density was 753.0 inhabitants per square mile (290.7/km^{2}). There were 117 housing units at an average density of 332.5 per square mile (128.4/km^{2}). The racial makeup of the village was 96.23% White, 1.51% Native American, 2.26% from other races. Hispanic or Latino of any race were 2.26% of the population.

There were 98 households, out of which 40.8% had children under the age of 18 living with them, 61.2% were married couples living together, 8.2% had a female householder with no husband present, and 21.4% were non-families. 18.4% of all households were made up of individuals, and 7.1% had someone living alone who was 65 years of age or older. The average household size was 2.70 and the average family size was 3.03.

In the village, the population was spread out, with 27.9% under the age of 18, 11.3% from 18 to 24, 35.8% from 25 to 44, 17.0% from 45 to 64, and 7.9% who were 65 years of age or older. The median age was 31 years. For every 100 females there were 103.8 males. For every 100 females age 18 and over, there were 112.2 males.

The median income for a household in the village was $39,000, and the median income for a family was $38,438. Males had a median income of $31,094 versus $19,688 for females. The per capita income for the village was $13,591. About 10.5% of families and 16.7% of the population were below the poverty line, including 23.8% of those under the age of eighteen and 22.7% of those 65 or over.

== Gallery ==
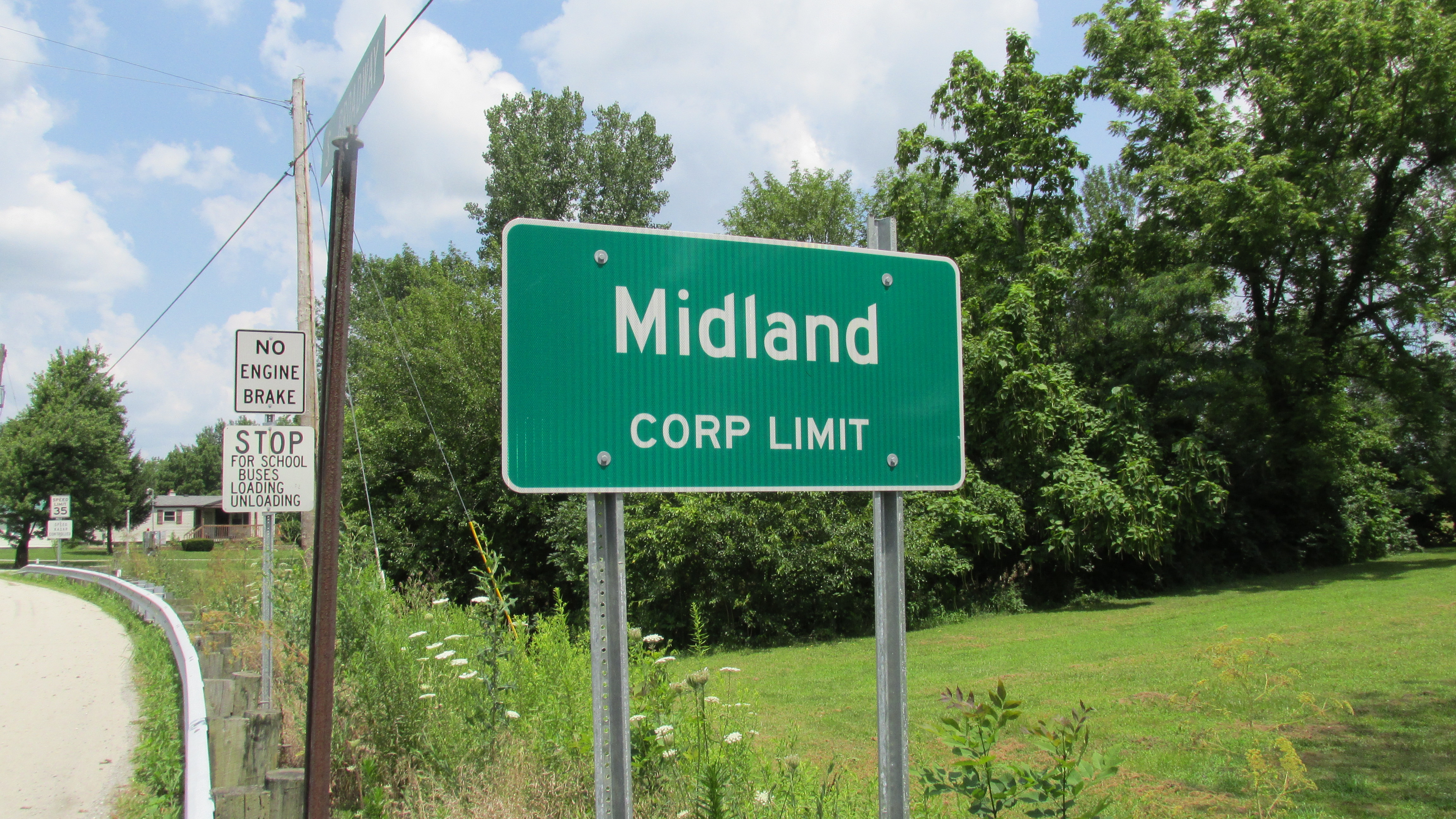
Midland corporation limit sign

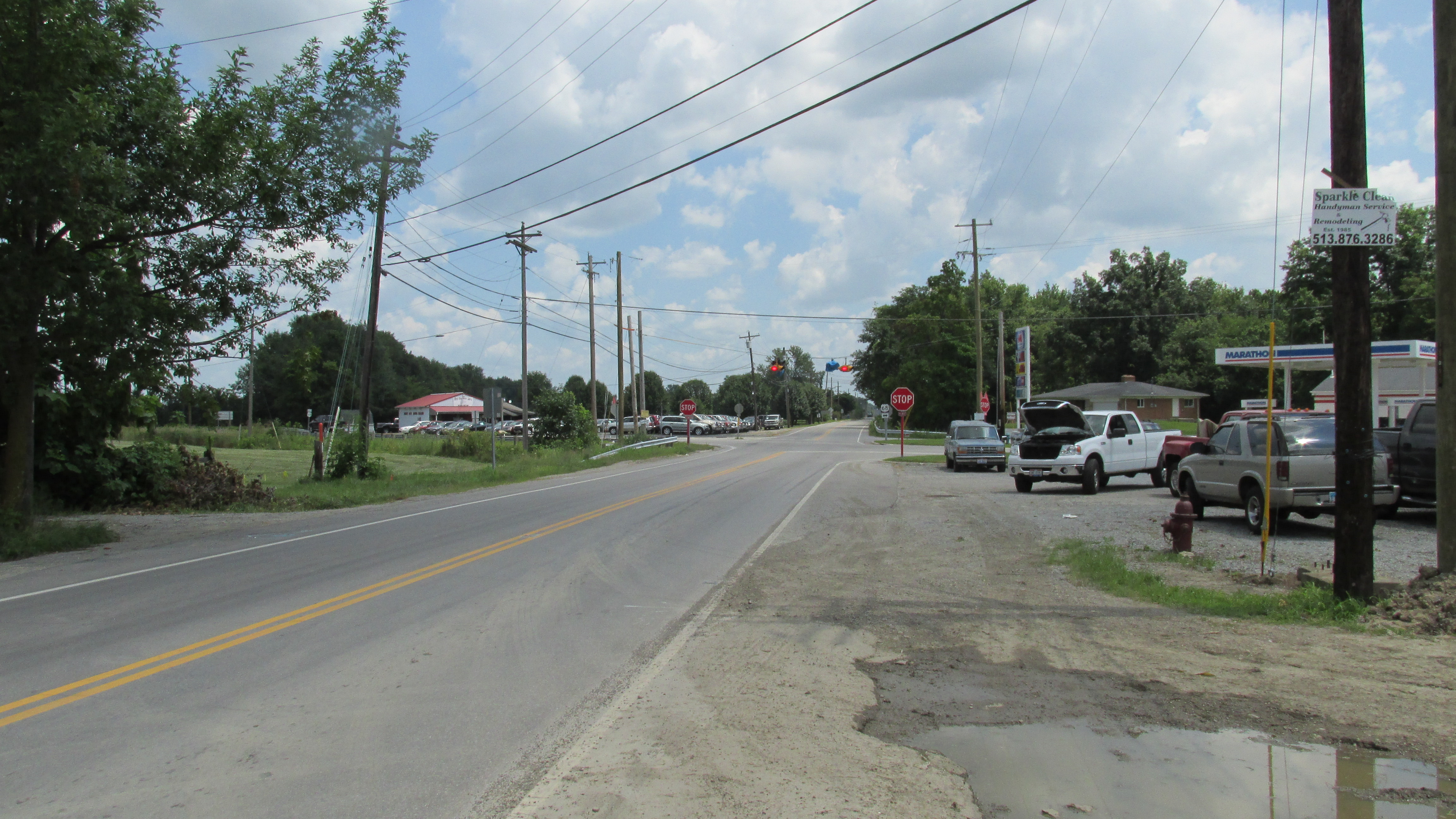
Intersection of Ohio Highway 28 and US Highway 68 in Midland
