= Burtonville, Ohio =

Unincorporated community in Ohio, U.S.

Coordinates: 39°24′18″N 83°48′52″W

Burtonville is an unincorporated community in Clinton County, in the U.S. state of Ohio.

== History ==
Burtonville was named in the 1840s after Peyton Burton, the proprietor of a local gristmill. Burtonville was never officially platted.
