= Ohio State Route 134 =

State highway in southwestern Ohio, US

State Route 134

Route information
- Maintained by ODOT
- Length: 41.21 mi (66.32 km)
- Existed: 1923–present

Major junctions
- South end: SR 32 in Sardinia
- US 50 in Dodson Township; US 68 in Wilmington; US 22 / SR 3 in Wilmington
- North end: Main Street in Port William

Location
- Country: United States
- State: Ohio
- Counties: Brown, Highland, Clinton

Highway system
- Ohio State Highway System; Interstate; US; State; Scenic
| ← SR 133 | → SR 135 |

State Route 134 (SR 134) is a north–south state highway in the southwestern portion of the U.S. state of Ohio. Its southern terminus is at its intersection with SR 32 in Sardinia and its northern terminus is at its intersection with Main Street in Port William.

== History ==
SR 134 was commissioned in 1923, on the same route as today between Sardinia and Wilmington. In 1926 the route was paved between Pulse and Lynchburg. The section of road between SR 28 and Wilmington was paved in 1934. The rest of the original highway was paved in 1935. In 1938 the highway was extended to Port William. One year later the route between Wilmington and Port William was paved.

== Major intersections ==
| County | Location | mi | km | Destinations | Notes |
|---|---|---|---|---|---|
| Brown | Sardinia | 0.00 | 0.00 | SR 32 (James A. Rhodes Appalachian Highway) / Main Street | |
| Highland | Clay Township | 4.95 | 7.97 | SR 321 east | Western terminus of SR 321 |
| Highland | Clay Township | 5.08 | 8.18 | SR 138 north / CR 39 (Greenbush Road) | Southern terminus of SR 138 |
| Highland | Clay Township | 7.15 | 11.51 | SR 286 west / CR 210 (Hereford Road) | Eastern terminus of SR 286 |
| Highland | Salem Township | 8.96 | 14.42 | SR 131 | |
| Highland | Dodson Township | 14.33 | 23.06 | US 50 west | Southern end of US 50 concurrency |
| Highland | Dodson Township | 14.40 | 23.17 | US 50 east | Northern end of US 50 concurrency |
| Highland | Lynchburg | 17.28 | 27.81 | SR 135 south (South Street) | Northern terminus of SR 135 |
| Clinton | Clark Township | 21.22 | 34.15 | SR 124 east – Hillsboro | Western terminus of SR 124 |
| Clinton | Clark Township | 24.29 | 39.09 | SR 28 – Martinsville, Blanchester, Greenfield | |
| Clinton | Clark–Washington township line | 26.65 | 42.89 | SR 350 – New Vienna, Clarksville, Cowan Lake State Park | |
| Clinton | Wilmington | 32.21 | 51.84 | US 68 south (South Street) | Southern end of US 68 concurrency |
| Clinton | Wilmington | 32.91 | 52.96 | SR 730 south (Truesdell Street) | Northern terminus of SR 730 |
| Clinton | Wilmington | 33.14 | 53.33 | US 22 east / SR 3 north (Main Street) – Wilmington College | |
| Clinton | Wilmington | 33.23 | 53.48 | US 22 west / SR 3 south (Locust Street) | |
| Clinton | Wilmington | 33.72 | 54.27 | US 68 north (Xenia Avenue) to South Street / I-71 | Northern end of US 68 concurrency |
| Clinton | Port William | 41.21 | 66.32 | Main Street | |
1.000 mi = 1.609 km; 1.000 km = 0.621 mi: Concurrency terminus
