= Ohio State Route 730 =

State highway in Clinton County, Ohio, US

State Route 730

Route information
- Maintained by ODOT
- Length: 11.45 mi (18.43 km)
- Existed: 1939–present

Major junctions
- South end: SR 133 near Blanchester
- North end: US 68 / SR 134 in Wilmington

Location
- Country: United States
- State: Ohio
- Counties: Clinton

Highway system
- Ohio State Highway System; Interstate; US; State; Scenic
| ← SR 729 | → SR 732 |

State Route 730 (SR 730) is a 11.45-mile-long (18.43 km) north–south state highway in the southwestern quadrant of the U.S. state of Ohio. The highway travels from its southern terminus at a T-intersection with SR 133 about 2.50 miles (4.02 km) northeast of Blanchester to its northern terminus at a signalized intersection with US 68 and SR 134 in Wilmington.

== Route description ==
All of SR 730 is situated in the western half of Clinton County. This highway is not included within the National Highway System (NHS). The NHS is a system of routes identified as being most important for the economy, mobility and defense of the country.

== History ==
The SR 730 designation was applied in 1939. The highway has maintained the same routing between SR 133 near Blanchester and the US 68/SR 134 concurrency in Wilmington throughout its lifespan. When it was established, SR 730 was a gravel highway, excepting the northernmost 3 miles (4.8 km) of the route, which were hard-surfaced. Three years after its inception, the entire length of SR 730 was paved.

== Major intersections ==
The entire route is in Clinton County.

| Location | mi | km | Destinations | Notes |
|---|---|---|---|---|
| Marion Township | 0.00 | 0.00 | SR 133 – Blanchester, Clarksville | |
| Vernon Township | 4.10 | 6.60 | SR 350 – Clarksville, New Vienna | |
| Wilmington | 11.45 | 18.43 | US 68 / SR 134 (South Street) / East Truesdell Street | |
1.000 mi = 1.609 km; 1.000 km = 0.621 mi
