= Ohio State Route 132 =

State highway in southwestern Ohio, US

State Route 132

Route information
- Maintained by ODOT
- Length: 40.05 mi (64.45 km)
- Existed: 1923–present

Major junctions
- South end: US 52 in New Richmond
- SR 32 near Batavia; US 50 in Owensville
- North end: SR 133 / SR 350 in Clarksville

Location
- Country: United States
- State: Ohio
- Counties: Clermont, Warren, Clinton

Highway system
- Ohio State Highway System; Interstate; US; State; Scenic
← SR 131	→ SR 133

State Route 132 (SR 132) is a north–south state highway in the southwestern portion of the U.S. state of Ohio. Its southern terminus is at its interchange with U.S. Route 52 in New Richmond and its northern terminus is at its intersection with SR 350 and SR 133 in Clarksville.

== History ==
SR 132 was commissioned in 1923 on the same route as it currently follows, between New Richmond and Owensville. The highway between New Richmond and Batavia was paved in 1927. In 1937 the route was extended north to Clarksville. The section of road between SR 131 and Clarksville was paved in 1942. The final section to be paved was between Owensville and SR 131, and it was paved in 1946.

== Major intersections ==
County	Location	mi	km	Destinations	Notes
Clermont	New Richmond	0.00	0.00	US 52	Southern terminus of SR 132
Clermont	Ohio Township	4.97	8.00	SR 749 west	Eastern terminus of SR 749
Clermont	Pierce–Batavia township line	6.99	11.25	SR 125 west	Western end of SR 125 concurrency
Clermont	Pierce–Batavia township line	7.31	11.76	SR 125 east	Eastern end of SR 125 concurrency
Clermont	Batavia	11.80	18.99	SR 222 south	Southern end of SR 222 concurrency
Clermont	Batavia	12.43	20.00	SR 32 east	Eastbound entrance and exit
Clermont	Batavia Township	12.52	20.15	SR 222 north	Northern end of SR 222 concurrency
Clermont	Batavia Township	12.73	20.49	SR 32 west	Westbound entrance and exit
Clermont	Stonelick Township	15.83	25.48	SR 276 south	Southern end of SR 276 concurrency
Clermont	Owensville	16.19	26.06	US 50 east / SR 276 ends	Northern terminus of SR 276; eastern end of US 50 concurrency
Clermont	Owensville	16.55	26.63	US 50 west	Western end of US 50 concurrency
Clermont	Stonelick Township	20.58	33.12	SR 131	
Clermont	Goshen Township	23.50	37.82	SR 48 north	Southern terminus of SR 48
Clermont	Goshen Township	24.80	39.91	SR 28 west	Western end of SR 28 concurrency
Clermont	Goshen Township	26.20	42.16	SR 28 east	Eastern end of SR 28 concurrency
Warren	Harlan Township	32.94	53.01	SR 123	
Warren	Harlan Township	38.73	62.33	SR 133 south	Southern end of SR 133 concurrency
Clinton	Clarksville	41.05	66.06	SR 133 ends / SR 350	Northern end of SR 133 concurrency; northern terminus of SR 132 and SR 133
1.000 mi = 1.609 km; 1.000 km = 0.621 mi: Concurrency terminus; Incomplete access
