= Ohio State Route 131 =

East–west state highway in southwestern Ohio, US

State Route 131

Route information
- Maintained by ODOT
- Length: 30.05 mi (48.36 km)
- Existed: 1923–present

Major junctions
- West end: US 50 in Milford
- US 50 near Fayetteville; US 68 near Fayetteville
- East end: SR 138 near Hillsboro

Location
- Country: United States
- State: Ohio
- Counties: Clermont, Brown, Highland

Highway system
- Ohio State Highway System; Interstate; US; State; Scenic
← SR 130	→ SR 132

State Route 131 (SR 131) is a 30.05-mile-long (48.36 km) east–west state highway in the southwestern quadrant of the U.S. state of Ohio. The western terminus of SR 131 is at a signalized intersection with U.S. Route 50 (US 50) in the eastern Cincinnati suburb of Milford. Its eastern terminus is at a T-intersection with SR 138 approximately 7.50 miles (12.07 km) southwest of Hillsboro.

== Route description ==
The path of SR 131 takes it through northern Clermont County, northwestern Brown County and western Highland County. There are no segments of SR 131 that are included within the National Highway System (NHS), a network of highways deemed to be most important for the economy, mobility and defense of the country.

== History ==
The SR 131 designation was applied in 1923. Originally, the highway was routed along its present alignment from its current western terminus in Milford to its junction with US 50, at the time designated as SR 26, southwest of Fayetteville. In 1946, SR 131 was extended east along its current alignment to its present eastern terminus at SR 138 southwest of Hillsboro, utilizing a previously un-numbered roadway between its previous eastern terminus and SR 134, and the entirety of what was SR 780 between SR 134 and SR 138.

== Major intersections ==
County	Location	mi	km	Destinations	Notes
Clermont	Milford	0.00	0.00	US 50	Western terminus at signalized intersection
Clermont	Stonelick Township	6.20	9.98	SR 132	Signalized intersection
Clermont	Wayne Township	8.51	13.70	SR 727 north	T-intersection marking southern terminus of SR 727
Clermont	Wayne Township	11.98	19.28	SR 133	
Brown	Perry Township	17.16	27.62	US 50	
Brown	Perry Township	19.06	30.67	US 68	
Highland	Salem Township	24.31	39.12	SR 134	
Highland	Hamer Township	30.05	48.36	SR 138	Eastern terminus at T-intersection
1.000 mi = 1.609 km; 1.000 km = 0.621 mi
