= Ohio State Route 28 =

East-west state highway in Ohio, US

State Route 28

Route information
- Maintained by ODOT
- Length: 70.68 mi (113.75 km)
- Existed: 1926–present

Major junctions
- West end: US 50 in Milford
- I-275 in Miami Township; US 68 near Midland; US 62 in Leesburg
- East end: US 50 near Chillicothe

Location
- Country: United States
- State: Ohio
- Counties: Clermont, Warren, Clinton, Highland, Ross

Highway system
- Ohio State Highway System; Interstate; US; State; Scenic
← US 27	→ SR 29

State Route 28 (SR 28) is an east–west state highway in the U.S. state of Ohio. Both of the route's termini are on U.S. Route 50 (US 50). Its western end is in Milford and its eastern end is near Chillicothe. The route has an interchange with Interstate 275 (I-275), and also intersects US 68 and US 62. The route was formerly signed as SR 27 before that number was assigned to US 27 in 1926.

== History ==
The corridor that SR 28 currently occupies has been a part of the state highway system from its establishment in 1912. Between 1912 and 1922, the corridor had been known as State Highway 8. This road extended further west to Cincinnati and east to Chillicothe. Following a statewide renumbering of state routes around 1923, the current highway became a part of SR 27. SR 27 ran from Cincinnati to Logan by way of Laurelville and Enterprise. After the establishment of the U.S. highway system in 1926, the designation of US 27 in the southwestern corner of the state resulted in the renumbering of the roadway to SR 28. Following this renumbering, the road to Cincinnati became part of US 50 while the route to Logan resulted in a number of separate highways completing the former routing to the east: US 50, US 23, SR 159, SR 180, and SR 31 (now US 33).

Throughout most of its history, SR 28's routing has generally remained the same. Around 1994, a short controlled-access highway opened east of I-275 that bypassed Mulberry. The bypass features one interchange for Wolfpen-Pleasant Hill Road. Prior to 2015, a 0.89-mile-long (1.43 km) concurrency existed along US 50 at SR 28's west end in Milford. The road extended along Main Street and Water Street where it crossed the Little Miami River into Hamilton County and ended at SR 126.

== Major junctions ==
County	Location	mi	km	Destinations	Notes
Clermont	Milford	0.00	0.00	US 50 (Lila Avenue) / Center Street / Wallace Avenue	
Clermont	Miami Township	1.36– 1.62	2.19– 2.61	I-275 to I-71 / SR 32 – Kentucky, Columbus	Exit 57 (I-275)
Clermont	Miami Township	2.65– 2.89	4.26– 4.65	CR 132 (Wolfpen-Pleasant Hill Road)	Interchange; eastbound exit and westbound entrance
Clermont	Goshen Township	6.22	10.01	SR 48 north – Loveland	Western end of SR 48 concurrency
Clermont	Goshen Township	6.62	10.65	SR 48 south – Owensville	Eastern end of SR 48 concurrency
Clermont	Goshen Township	7.79	12.54	SR 132 south / Dick Flynn Boulevard – Owensville	Western end of SR 132 concurrency
Clermont	Goshen Township	9.19	14.79	SR 132 north – Pleasant Plain	Eastern end of SR 132 concurrency
Warren	Harlan Township	17.37	27.95	SR 123 north – Lebanon, Morrow	Western end of SR 123 concurrency
Clinton	Blanchester	18.33	29.50	SR 123 south / SR 133 (Broadway)	Eastern end of SR 123 concurrency
Clinton	Jefferson Township	22.90	36.85	US 68 – Wilmington, Fayetteville	
Clinton	Clark Township	29.12	46.86	SR 134 – Wilmington, Lynchburg	
Clinton	New Vienna	34.51	55.54	SR 73 / SR 350 west (South Street) – Wilmington, Hillsboro	Eastern terminus of SR 350
Highland	Highland	40.02	64.41	SR 72 south (New Lexington Avenue)	Western end of SR 72 concurrency
Highland	Fairfield Township	40.60	65.34	SR 72 north	Eastern end of SR 72 concurrency
Highland	Leesburg	42.11	67.77	US 62 (Advent Street)	
Highland	Leesburg	42.39	68.22	SR 771 south (Fairfield Street)	Northern terminus of SR 771
Highland	Greenfield	51.77	83.32	SR 138 west / SR 753 south (7th Street)	Western end of SR 138 / SR 753 concurrencies
Highland	Greenfield	52.21	84.02	SR 41 north / SR 753 north (Washington Street)	Eastern end of SR 753 concurrency; western end of SR 41 concurrency
Ross	Buckskin Township	52.79	84.96	SR 138 east / CR 1 (Thrifton Road)	Eastern end of SR 138 concurrency
Ross	Buckskin Township	53.09	85.44	SR 41 south	Eastern end of SR 41 concurrency
Ross	Twin Township	69.82	112.36	US 50 – Chillicothe	
1.000 mi = 1.609 km; 1.000 km = 0.621 mi: Concurrency terminus; Incomplete access
