= Vernon Township, Clinton County, Ohio =

Township in Ohio, US

- Township
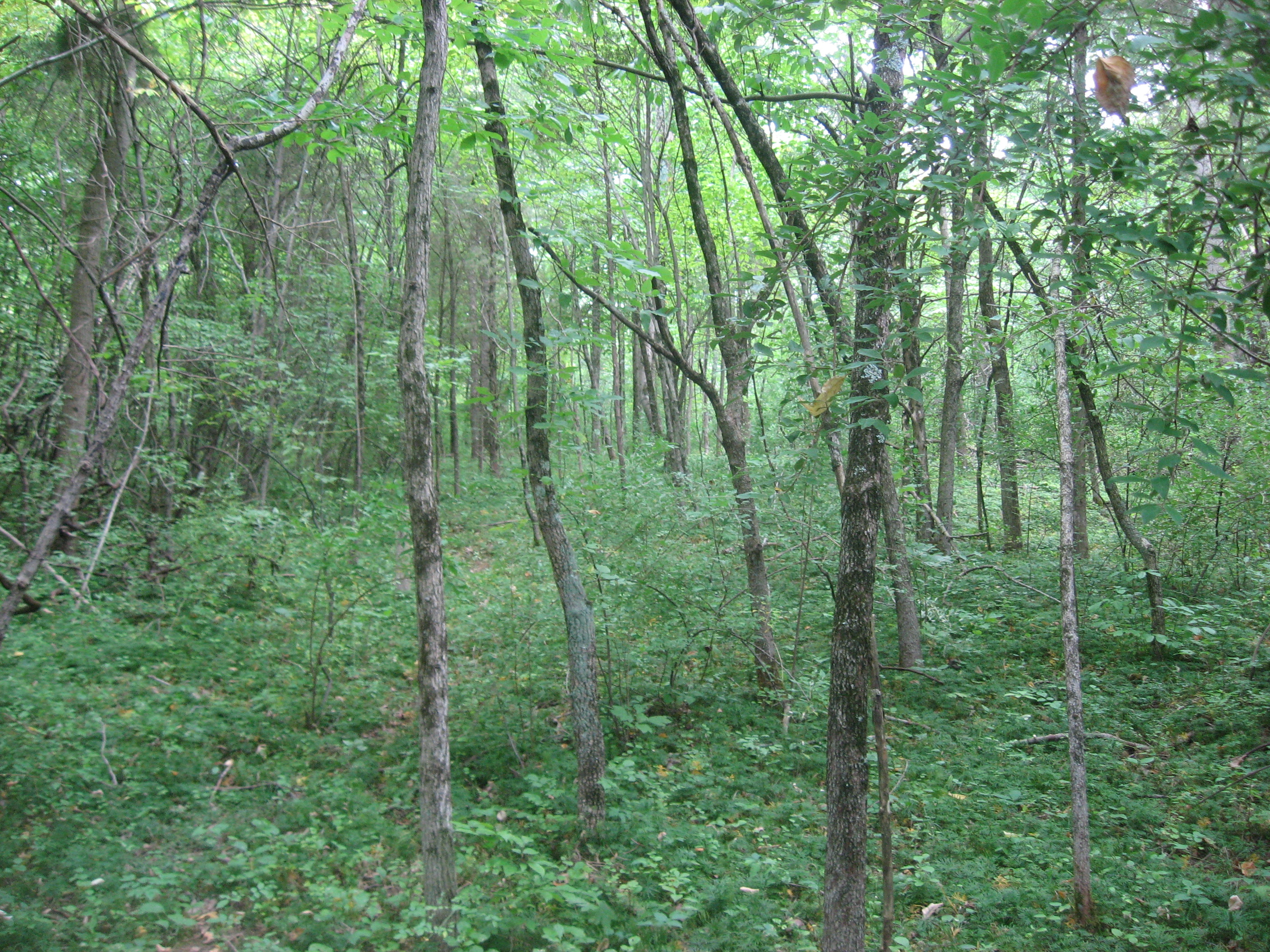
- Part of the Cowan Creek Circular Enclosure at Cowan Lake State Park

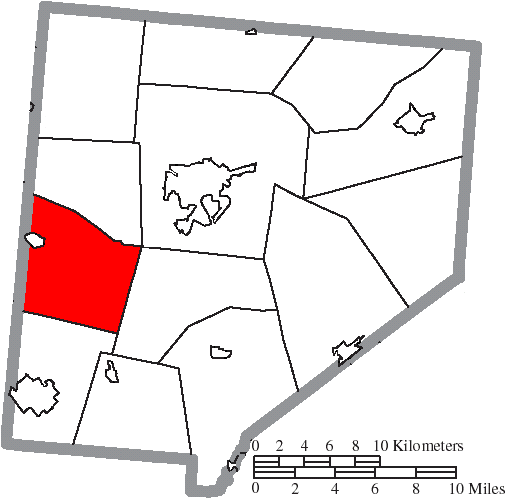
- Location of Vernon Township in Clinton County
- Coordinates: 39°23′48″N 83°57′11″W
- Country: United States
- State: Ohio
- County: Clinton

Area
  - Total: 28.0 sq mi (72.6 km^{2})
  - Land: 26.8 sq mi (69.5 km^{2})
  - Water: 1.2 sq mi (3.2 km^{2})
- Elevation: 938 ft (286 m)

Population (2020)
  - Total: 2,951
  - Density: 110/sq mi (42.5/km^{2})
- Time zone: UTC-5 (Eastern (EST))
  - Summer (DST): UTC-4 (EDT)
- FIPS code: 39-79772
- GNIS feature ID: 1085885

Vernon Township is one of the thirteen townships of Clinton County, Ohio, United States. The 2020 census reported 2,951 people living in the township.

== Geography ==
Located in the western part of the county, it borders the following townships:

- Adams Township - north
- Union Township - northeast corner
- Washington Township - east
- Marion Township - south
- Harlan Township, Warren County - southwest
- Washington Township, Warren County - west

The entire township lies in the Virginia Military District.

Cowan Lake State Park is located partially in Vernon Township.

The village of Clarksville is located in western Vernon Township.

== Transportation ==
Major highways include State Routes 132, 133, 350, and 730, and the 3C Highway.

== Name and history ==
Vernon Township was organized in 1810.

Statewide, other Vernon Townships are located in Crawford and Trumbull counties.

== Government ==
The township is governed by a three-member board of trustees, who are elected in November of odd-numbered years to a four-year term beginning on the following January 1. Two are elected in the year after the presidential election and one is elected in the year before it. There is also an elected township fiscal officer, who serves a four-year term beginning on April 1 of the year after the election, which is held in November of the year before the presidential election. Vacancies in the fiscal officership or on the board of trustees are filled by the remaining trustees.

== Education ==
The township is in the Clinton-Massie Local School District.
