= Jefferson Township, Clinton County, Ohio =

Township in Ohio, US

- Township
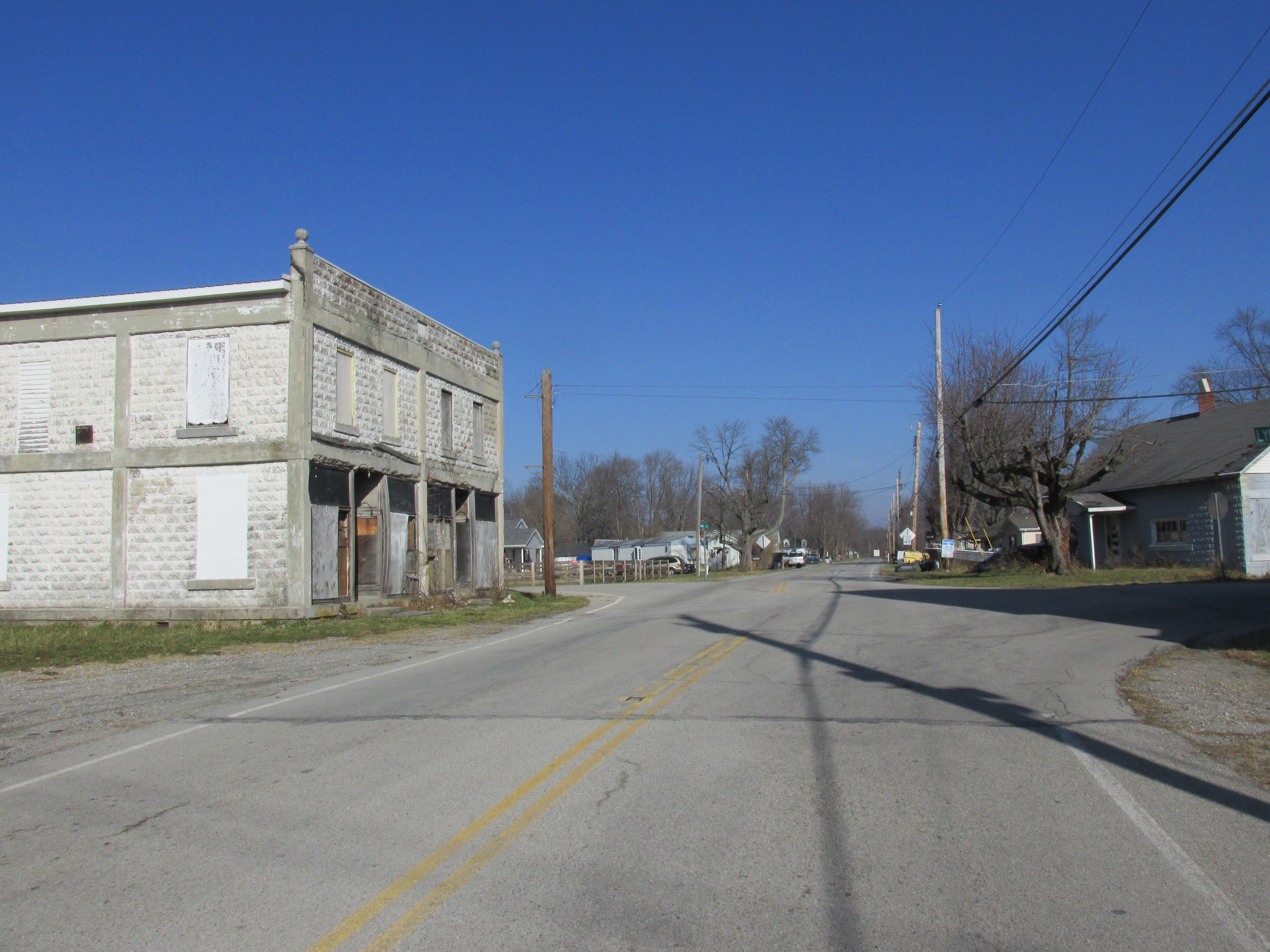
- Buildings at Westboro

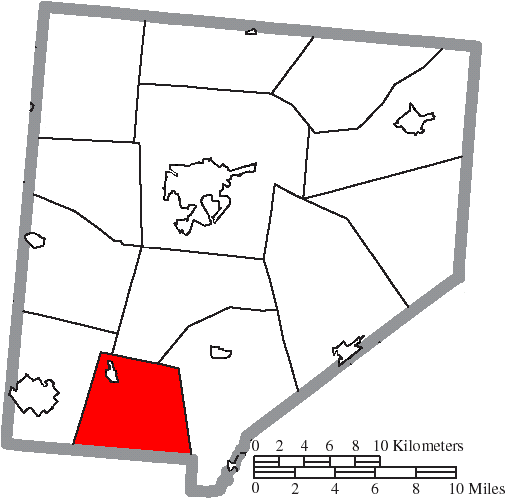
- Location of Jefferson Township in Clinton County
- Coordinates: 39°16′58″N 83°54′23″W
- Country: United States
- State: Ohio
- County: Clinton

Area
  - Total: 23.2 sq mi (60.1 km^{2})
  - Land: 23.1 sq mi (59.9 km^{2})
  - Water: 0.12 sq mi (0.3 km^{2})
- Elevation: 994 ft (303 m)

Population (2020)
  - Total: 1,325
  - Density: 57.3/sq mi (22.1/km^{2})
- Time zone: UTC-5 (Eastern (EST))
  - Summer (DST): UTC-4 (EDT)
- FIPS code: 39-38542
- GNIS feature ID: 1085880

Jefferson Township is one of the thirteen townships of Clinton County, Ohio, United States. The 2020 census reported 1,325 people living in the township.

== Geography ==
Located in the southwestern part of the county, it borders the following townships:

- Washington Township - north
- Clark Township - east
- Dodson Township, Highland County - southeast
- Perry Township, Brown County - southwest
- Marion Township - west

The entire township lies in the Virginia Military District.

The village of Midland is located in northwestern Jefferson Township.

== Transportation ==
Major highways include U.S. Route 68 and State Routes 28 and 251.

== Name and history ==
Named for President Thomas Jefferson, it is one of twenty-four Jefferson Townships statewide. It was erected from Clark and Marion townships by the Clinton County Commissioners in 1839.

The charcoal kilns at Klocks Crossing were located along the B & O Railroad tracks outside Westboro.

== Government ==
The township is governed by a three-member board of trustees, who are elected in November of odd-numbered years to a four-year term beginning on the following January 1. Two are elected in the year after the presidential election and one is elected in the year before it. There is also an elected township fiscal officer, who serves a four-year term beginning on April 1 of the year after the election, which is held in November of the year before the presidential election. Vacancies in the fiscal officership or on the board of trustees are filled by the remaining trustees.
