= Ohio State Route 380 =

State highway in southwestern Ohio, US

State Route 380

Route information
- Maintained by ODOT
- Length: 18.04 mi (29.03 km)
- Existed: 1935–present

Major junctions
- South end: US 22 / SR 3 / CR 4 near Clarksville
- North end: US 35 Bus. / US 42 / US 68 in Xenia

Location
- Country: United States
- State: Ohio
- Counties: Clinton, Greene

Highway system
- Ohio State Highway System; Interstate; US; State; Scenic
← SR 379	→ SR 381

State Route 380 (SR 380) is a north–south state highway in the southwestern quadrant of the U.S. state of Ohio. The southern terminus of SR 380 is at its junction with the concurrency of U.S. Route 22 (US 22) and SR 3 nearly 3 miles (4.8 km) northeast of Clarksville. Its northern terminus is in downtown Xenia, following a brief concurrency with US 68, at the signalized intersection where the U.S. route meets US 42.

== Route description ==
Along its way, SR 380 travels through the northwestern part of Clinton County and the southwestern quadrant of Greene County. No segment of SR 380 is included within the National Highway System (NHS). The NHS is a network of highways deemed most important for the economy, mobility and defense of the country.

== History ==
SR 380 was assigned in 1935. Initially, it served as a spur route that ran along its present alignment from its current northern terminus in downtown Xenia southwest to the former northwestern Clinton County village of New Burlington. Three years after its designation, SR 380 was extended to the southeast from New Burlington along a previously un-numbered roadway to its present southern terminus at the US 22/SR 3 concurrency near Clarksville.

== Major intersections ==
County	Location	mi	km	Destinations	Notes
Clinton	Adams Township	0.00	0.00	US 22 / SR 3 / CR 4 (Creek Road) – Wilmington, Cincinnati	
Clinton	Chester Township	3.54	5.70	SR 73 to I-71 – Wilmington, Waynesville	
Greene	Xenia	17.67	28.44	US 68 south (Home Avenue) / South Miami Avenue	Southern end of US 68 concurrency
Greene	Xenia	18.04	29.03	US 42 / US 35 Bus. (Main Street) / US 68 north (North Detroit Avenue)	Northern end of US 68 concurrency
1.000 mi = 1.609 km; 1.000 km = 0.621 mi: Concurrency terminus
