= Lake Lorelei, Ohio =

- Census-designated place
- Location within Ohio
- Coordinates: 39°11′15″N 83°58′17″W
- Country: United States
- State: Ohio
- County: Brown

Area
  - Total: 2.45 sq mi (6.35 km^{2})
  - Land: 2.20 sq mi (5.70 km^{2})
  - Water: 0.25 sq mi (0.65 km^{2})
- Elevation: 942 ft (287 m)

Population (2020)
  - Total: 1,172
  - Density: 532.4/sq mi (205.56/km^{2})
- Time zone: UTC-5 (Eastern (EST))
  - Summer (DST): UTC-4 (EDT)
- Area code: 513
- FIPS code: 39-41419
- GNIS feature ID: 2628918

Lake Lorelei is a gated community and census-designated place in Brown County, Ohio, United States, near the village of Fayetteville. As of the 2020 census, it had a population of 1,172.

== History ==
Lake Lorelei was started in the late 1960s by property developers as a lakeside planned community.

== Geography ==
Lake Lorelei is located in northern Brown County, in the western part of Perry Township. It consists of a housing development built around Lake Lorelei, a reservoir on Glady Run, a tributary of the East Fork of the Little Miami River.

State Route 131 forms the southern border of the CDP, and U.S. Route 50 touches the community's southeast corner. Lake Lorelei is 3 miles (5 km) west of the village of Fayetteville and 34 miles (55 km) east of downtown Cincinnati.

== Demographics ==
Historical population
Census	Pop.	Note	%±
2020	1,172		—
U.S. Decennial Census
