= Ohio State Route 350 =

State highway in southwestern Ohio, US

State Route 350

Route information
- Maintained by ODOT
- Length: 27.41 mi (44.11 km)
- Existed: 1935–present

Major junctions
- West end: SR 123 near Lebanon
- US 22 near Clarksville; US 68 near Wilmington
- East end: SR 28 / SR 73 in New Vienna

Location
- Country: United States
- State: Ohio
- Counties: Warren, Clinton

Highway system
- Ohio State Highway System; Interstate; US; State; Scenic
← SR 349	→ SR 351

State Route 350 (SR 350) is a 27.41-mile (44.11 km) east–west state highway in the southwest portion of the U.S. state of Ohio. The highway has its western terminus at SR 123 approximately 2.50 miles (4.02 km) southeast of Lebanon, and just southeast of the interchange Interstate 71 (I-71) has with SR 123 at its exit 32. The eastern terminus of State Route 350 is in New Vienna, following its nearly 2-mile (3.2 km) long concurrency with SR 73, where the two routes meet SR 28 at a signalized intersection.

== Route description ==
SR 350 passes through portions of Warren and Clinton Counties along its way. No portion of this state highway is included within the National Highway System (NHS). The NHS is a network of highways determined to be most important for the nation's economy, mobility and defense. Between US-22 & SR 123, SR 350 is closed to trucks due to several sharp bends.

== History ==
The SR 350 designation was applied in 1935. The highway originally ran entirely within Warren County, along its current alignment from its western terminus at SR 123 southeast of Lebanon to its junction with the concurrency of U.S. Route 22 (US 22) and SR 3 west of Clarksville.

In 1938, SR 350 was extended east along a previously un-numbered roadway into Clinton County, where its new endpoint was at its junction with SR 73 northwest of New Vienna. One year later, SR 350 was extended via a short concurrency southeast with SR 73, then northeasterly along a new state highway alignment to Sabina, where it intersected US 22/SR 3 a second time, and came to an end. No sooner than that extension took place, in 1940 the majority of it was reversed when a southward extension of SR 729 replaced the segment between SR 73 and US 22/SR 3. Consequently, in lieu of SR 350 being reinstated to its 1938 eastern terminus at SR 73, it was instead routed to continue southeast along SR 73 from the new southern terminus of SR 729 into New Vienna, where the route came to an end at its present eastern terminus where SR 73 meets SR 28.

== Major intersections ==
County	Location	mi	km	Destinations	Notes
Warren	Turtle Creek Township	0.00	0.00	SR 123 to I-71 / Phillips Road – Lebanon, Morrow	
Warren	Washington Township	7.90	12.71	US 22 / SR 3 – Wilmington, Cincinnati	
Clinton	Clarksville	9.88	15.90	SR 132 south / SR 133 south (First Street)	Northern termini of SR 132 and SR 133
Clinton	Vernon Township	13.41	21.58	SR 730 – Wilmington, Blanchester, Cowan Lake State Park	
Clinton	Washington Township	17.10	27.52	US 68 – Wilmington, Fayetteville	Interchange
Clinton	Clark–Washington township line	20.64	33.22	SR 134 – Wilmington, Lynchburg	
Clinton	Green Township	25.07	40.35	SR 73 west	Western end of SR 73 concurrency
Clinton	Green Township	25.30	40.72	SR 729 north / Thornburg Road – Sabina	Southern terminus of SR 729
Clinton	New Vienna	27.41	44.11	SR 28 (West Street) / SR 73 east (South Street) – Hillsboro, Blanchester, Greenfield	Eastern end of SR 73 concurrency
1.000 mi = 1.609 km; 1.000 km = 0.621 mi: Concurrency terminus
