= Cuba, Clinton County, Ohio =

Unincorporated community in Ohio, US

Coordinates: 39°21′40″N 83°51′50″W

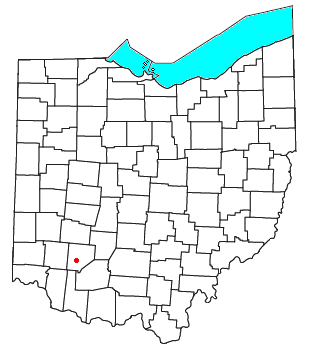
Location of Cuba, Ohio

Cuba is an unincorporated community in western Washington Township, Clinton County, Ohio, United States. It has a post office with the ZIP code 45114. It lies at the intersection of U.S. Route 68 with State Route 350. In addition to the post office, the community is home to the Cuba Friends Meeting, a part of the Wilmington Yearly Meeting of the Society of Friends.

== History ==
Cuba was platted in 1814. The origin of the name Cuba is obscure. A post office called Cuba has been in operation since 1826.

== Gallery ==
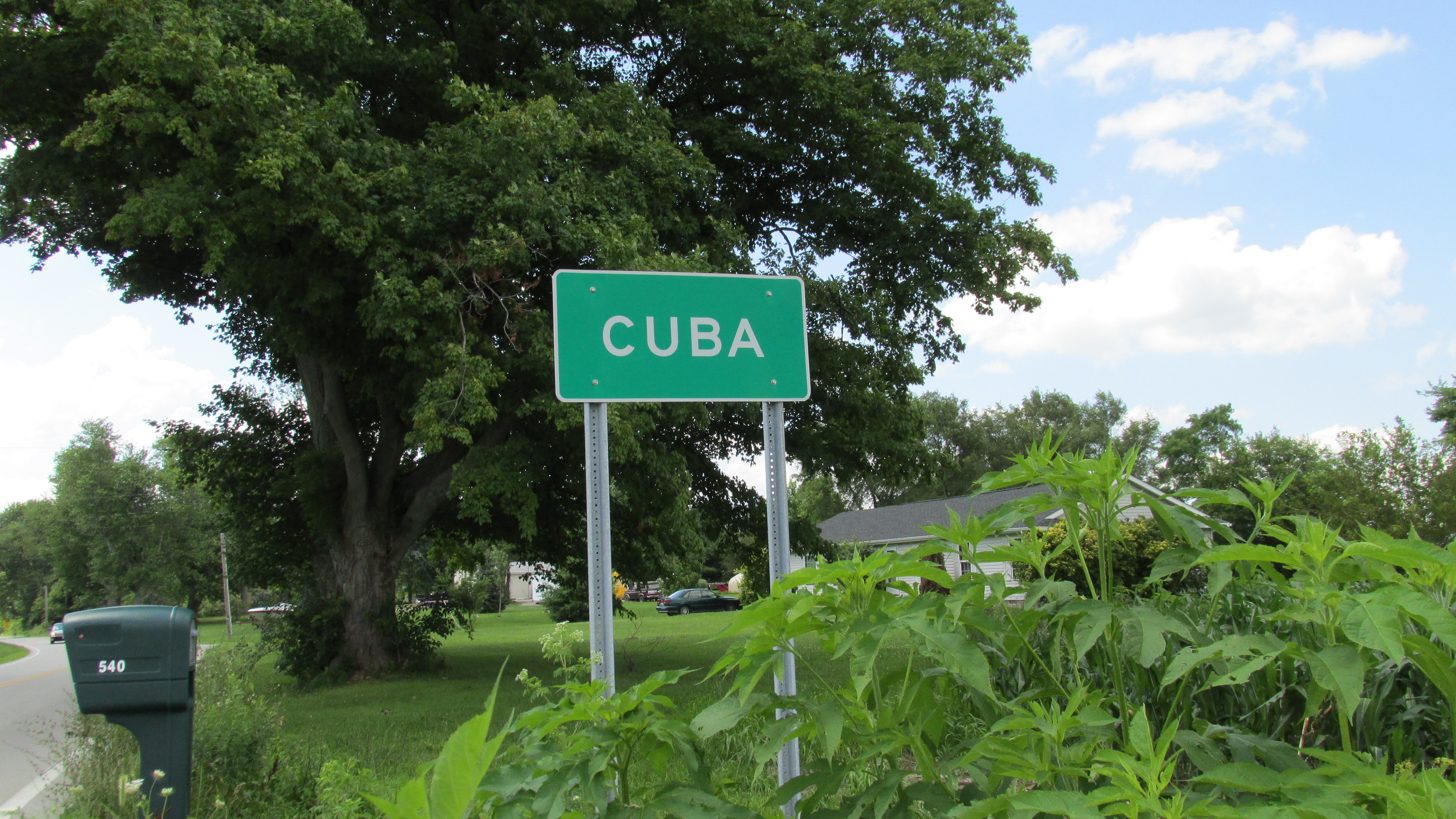
Cuba community sign

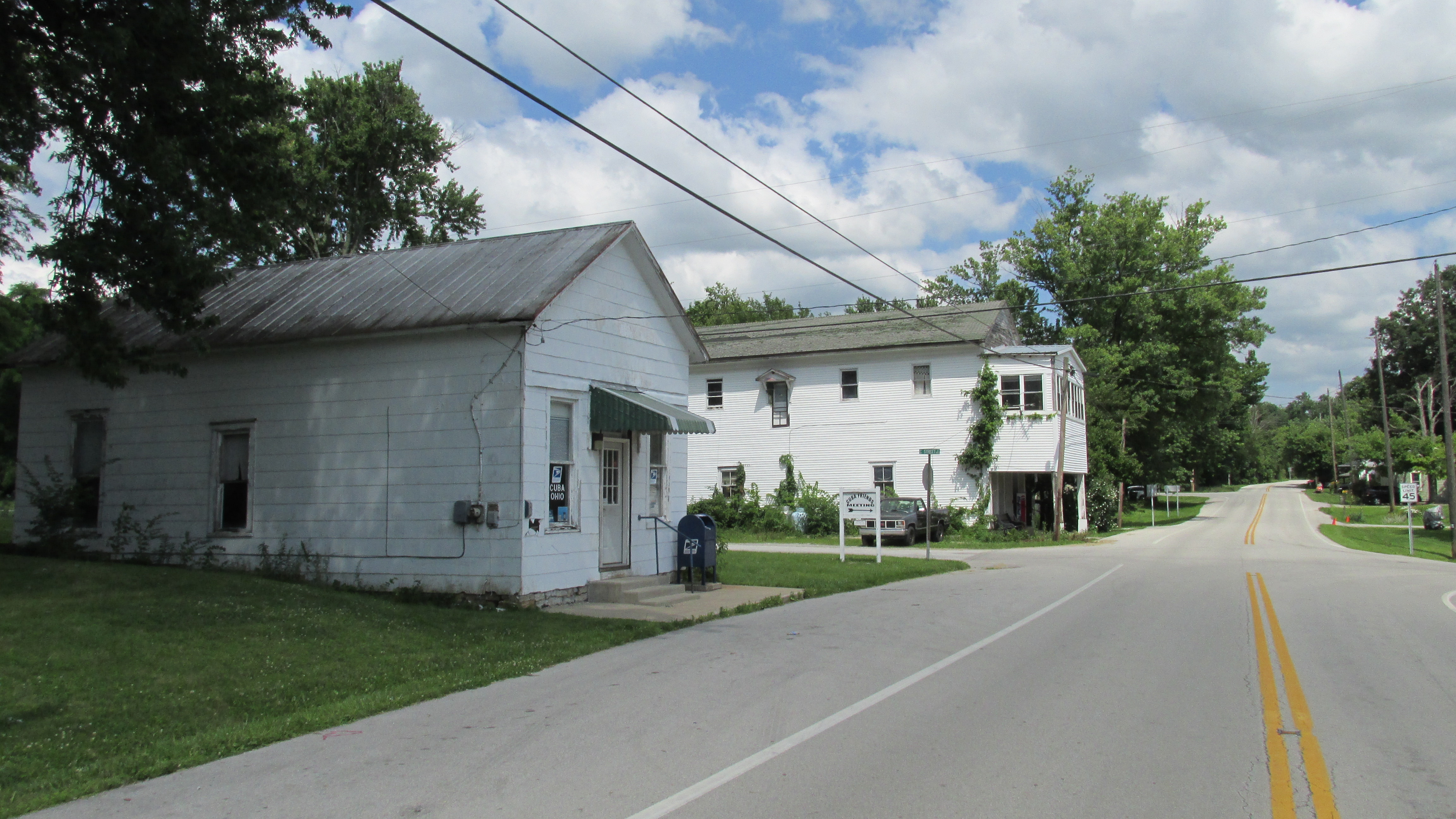
Looking east on Ohio Highway 350 in Cuba.
