= Washington Township, Clinton County, Ohio =

Township in Ohio, US

- Township
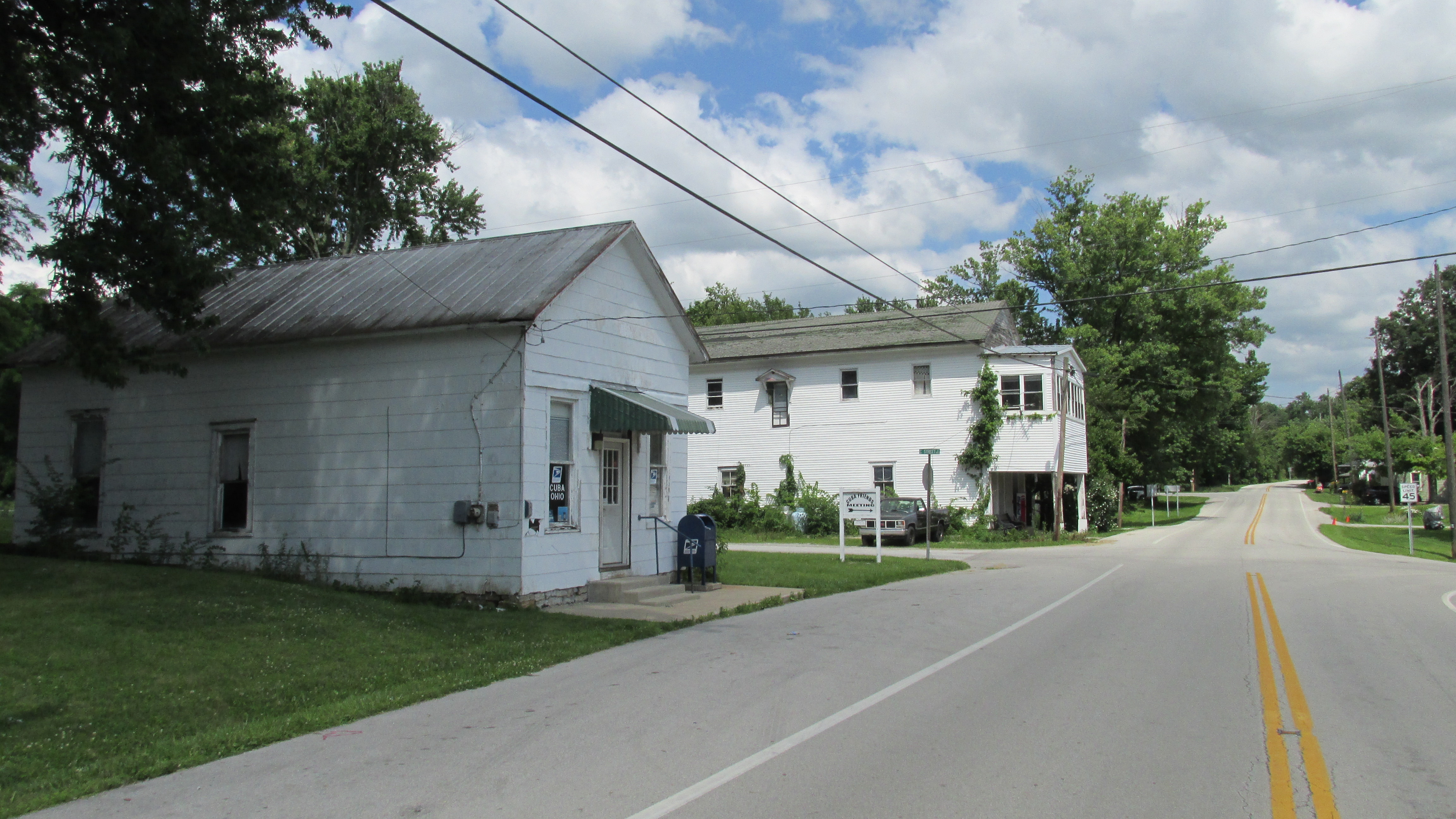
- Buildings in Cuba

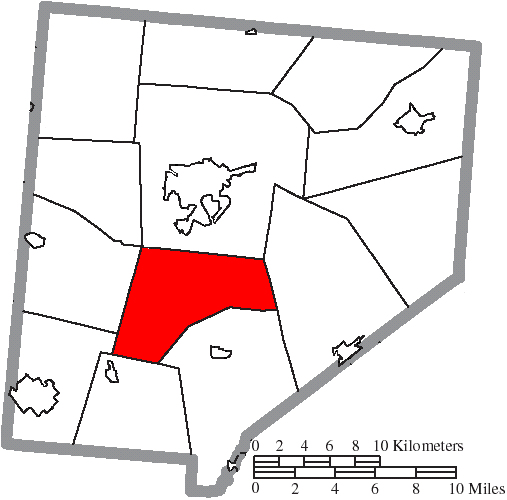
- Location of Washington Township in Clinton County
- Coordinates: 39°21′42″N 83°51′43″W
- Country: United States
- State: Ohio
- County: Clinton

Area
  - Total: 27.4 sq mi (71.0 km^{2})
  - Land: 27.1 sq mi (70.2 km^{2})
  - Water: 0.31 sq mi (0.8 km^{2})
- Elevation: 1,086 ft (331 m)

Population (2020)
  - Total: 2,015
  - Density: 74.3/sq mi (28.7/km^{2})
- Time zone: UTC-5 (Eastern (EST))
  - Summer (DST): UTC-4 (EDT)
- Area codes: 937, 326
- FIPS code: 39-81144
- GNIS feature ID: 1085886

Washington Township is one of the thirteen townships of Clinton County, Ohio, United States. The population as of the 2020 census was 2,015.

== Geography ==
Located in the southern part of the county, it borders the following townships:

- Union Township - north
- Green Township - east
- Clark Township - southeast
- Jefferson Township - south
- Marion Township - southwest
- Vernon Township - west
- Adams Township - northwest corner

The entire township lies in the Virginia Military District.

Part of Cowan Lake State Park is located in Washington Township.

No municipalities are located in Washington Township, although the unincorporated community of Cuba lies in the western part of the township. It also contains Morrisville.

== Name and history ==
Washington Township was founded in 1835.

It is one of forty-three Washington Townships statewide.

== Transportation ==
Major roads in Washington Township are U.S. Route 68 and State Routes 28 and 350.

== Government ==
The township is governed by a three-member board of trustees, who are elected in November of odd-numbered years to a four-year term beginning on the following January 1. Two are elected in the year after the presidential election and one is elected in the year before it. There is also an elected township fiscal officer, who serves a four-year term beginning on April 1 of the year after the election, which is held in November of the year before the presidential election. Vacancies in the fiscal officership or on the board of trustees are filled by the remaining trustees.
