= Adams Township, Clinton County, Ohio =

Township in Ohio, US

- Township
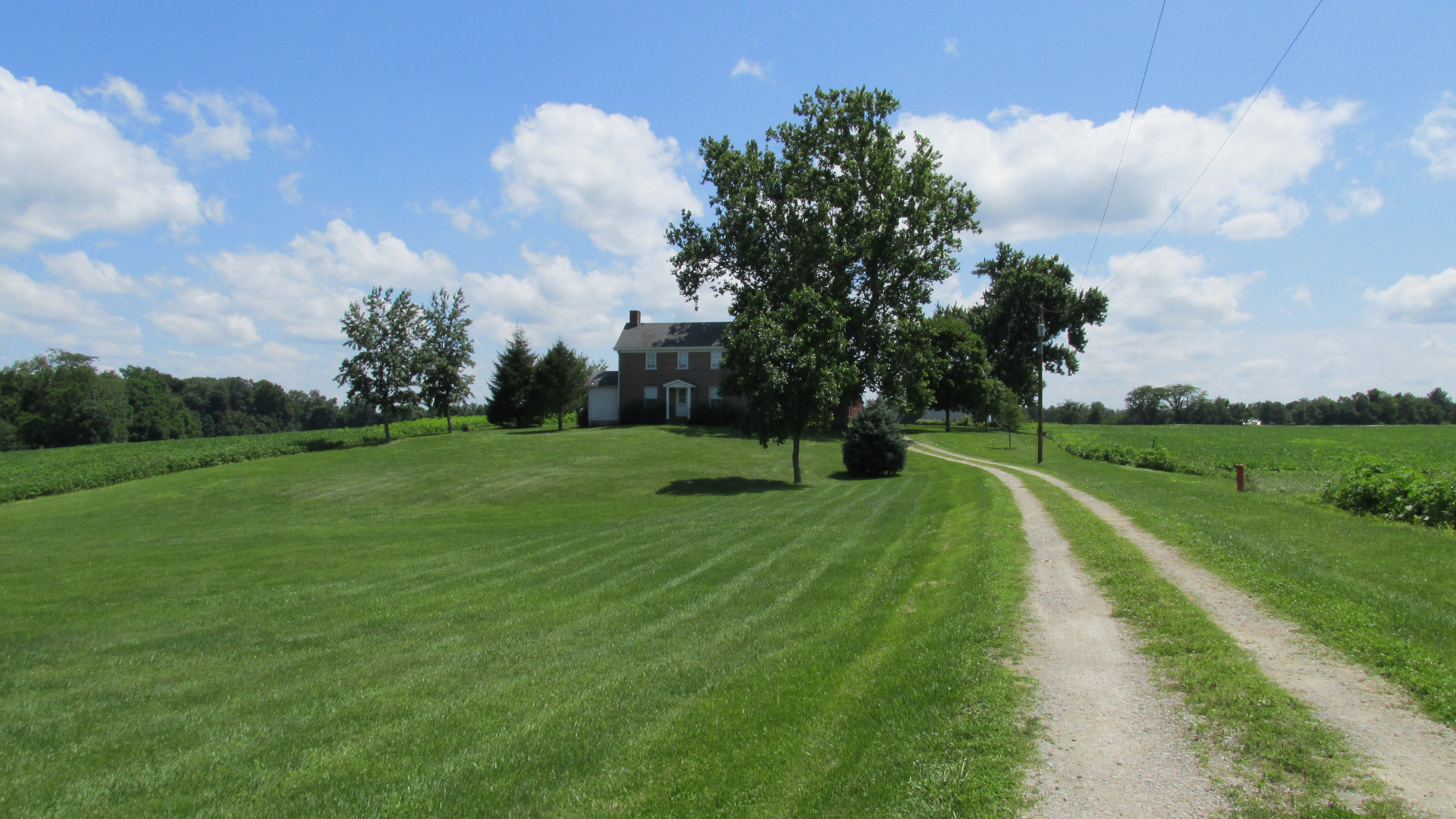
- The Eli Harvey House, a historic site in the township

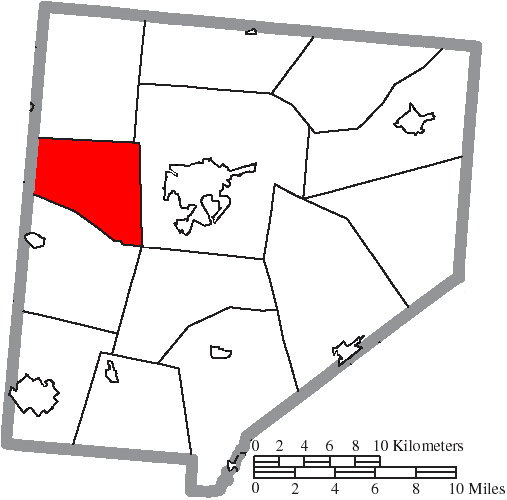
- Location of Adams Township in Clinton County
- Coordinates: 39°26′23″N 83°55′38″W
- Country: United States
- State: Ohio
- County: Clinton

Area
  - Total: 21.7 sq mi (56.2 km^{2})
  - Land: 21.5 sq mi (55.6 km^{2})
  - Water: 0.23 sq mi (0.6 km^{2})
- Elevation: 860 ft (262 m)

Population (2020)
  - Total: 2,040
  - Density: 95.0/sq mi (36.7/km^{2})
- Time zone: UTC-5 (Eastern (EST))
  - Summer (DST): UTC-4 (EDT)
- FIPS code: 39-00226
- GNIS feature ID: 1085876

Adams Township is one of the thirteen townships of Clinton County, Ohio, United States. As of the 2020 census the population was 2,040.

== Geography ==
Located in the western part of the county, it borders the following townships:

- Chester Township - north
- Union Township - east
- Washington Township - southeast corner
- Vernon Township - south
- Washington Township, Warren County - southwest
- Massie Township, Warren County - west

No municipalities are located in Adams Township, but it does contain the unincorporated communities of Ogden and Sligo.

== Name and history ==
Named for President John Quincy Adams, it is one of ten Adams Townships statewide.

It was created by the Clinton County Commissioners in 1849 from parts of Chester, Vernon, and Union townships.

== Transportation ==
Major highways include Interstate 71, the 3C Highway (combined U.S. Route 22 and Ohio State Route 3), and State Route 380.

== Government ==
The township is governed by a three-member board of trustees, who are elected in November of odd-numbered years to a four-year term beginning on the following January 1. Two are elected in the year after the presidential election and one is elected in the year before it. There is also an elected township fiscal officer, who serves a four-year term beginning on April 1 of the year after the election, which is held in November of the year before the presidential election. Vacancies in the fiscal officership or on the board of trustees are filled by the remaining trustees.
