= Ohio State Route 138 =

State highway in southwestern Ohio, US

State Route 138

Route information
- Maintained by ODOT
- Length: 60.37 mi (97.16 km)
- Existed: 1923–present

Major junctions
- West end: SR 134 / CR 39 in Buford
- US 50 / US 62 / SR 73 in Hillsboro; US 35 near Clarksburg
- East end: US 22 / CR 5 near Williamsport

Location
- Country: United States
- State: Ohio
- Counties: Highland, Ross, Pickaway

Highway system
- Ohio State Highway System; Interstate; US; State; Scenic
← SR 137	→ SR 139

State Route 138 (SR 138) is an east–west state highway in the southwestern portion of the U.S. state of Ohio. Its west terminus is at its intersection with SR 134 in Buford and its eastern terminus is at its intersection with US 22 east of Williamsport.

== History ==
SR 138 was first designated on its current route between Hillsboro and Greenfield in 1923, though the road had been a part of the state highway system since its creation in 1912 as SR 260. The route was extended in 1937 from its two ends to the route it travels today. No major changes to SR 138's routing have occurred since then.

== Major junctions ==
County	Location	mi	km	Destinations	Notes
Highland	Clay Township	0.00	0.00	SR 134 / CR 39 (Greenbush Road)	
Highland	Hamer Township	7.03	11.31	SR 131 west	Eastern terminus of SR 131
Highland	Hillsboro	15.35	24.70	US 62 west / SR 73 east (South High Street) / East South Street	Western end of US 62 / SR 73 concurrency
Highland	Hillsboro	15.54	25.01	US 50 / SR 73 west / SR 124 (Main Street)	Eastern end of SR 73 concurrency
Highland	Hillsboro	16.30	26.23	US 62 east (North High Street)	Eastern end of US 62 concurrency
Highland	Paint Township	25.18	40.52	SR 771 north	Southern terminus of SR 771
Highland	Greenfield	32.48	52.27	SR 753 south (South 7th Street)	Western end of SR 753 concurrency
Highland	Greenfield	32.79	52.77	SR 28 west (Jefferson Street) / North 7th Street	Western end of SR 28 concurrency
Highland	Greenfield	33.23	53.48	SR 41 north / SR 753 north (Washington Street)	Western end of SR 753 concurrency / eastern end of SR 41 concurrency
Ross	Buckskin Township	33.81	54.41	SR 28 east / SR 41 south / CR 1 (Thrifton Road)	Eastern end of SR 28 / SR 41 concurrency
Ross	Concord Township	45.40	73.06	US 35 – Chillicothe, Dayton	Interchange
Ross	Clarksburg	50.68	81.56	SR 207 (Main Street)	
Pickaway	Wayne Township	60.37	97.16	US 22 / CR 5 (Smith Hulse Road)	
1.000 mi = 1.609 km; 1.000 km = 0.621 mi: Concurrency terminus
