= Klocks Crossing, Ohio =

Klocks Crossing
- Location within Ohio
- Coordinates: 39°15′24″N 83°50′15″W
- Country: United States
- State: Ohio
- County: Clinton County
- Elevation: 1,007 ft (307 m)
- GNIS feature ID: 1062840

Klocks Crossing (formerly Pleasant Grove) is a populated place and minor civil division (MCD) located within Jefferson Township in Clinton County, Ohio. It is a former whistle stop along the B & O Railroad between Lynchburg and Westboro.

== History ==
The original name of the site was the Town of Pleasant Grove, founded about 1857. The town was located along the Hillsboro Branch of the Marietta & Cincinnati Railroad (that was purchased by the B & O Railroad in 1890). One of the main industries of Klocks Crossing in the late nineteenth century was charcoal manufacturing at a large charcoal oven facility — that boasted the largest 'beehive kilns' in that part of the state. The ovens employed many of the local residents for decades.

Pleasant Grove's name was changed to Klocks Crossing in 1899, following an event in which town resident, Harley Klock, was struck and killed by a B & O freight train while in the midst of an epileptic seizure. During the twentieth century, after the closure of the charcoal burning station, Klocks Crossing became just a flag stop as the town's population shrunk in size.

== Geography ==
Klocks Crossing sits at an elevation of 1,007 feet.
