= Marion Township, Clinton County, Ohio =

Township in Ohio, US

- Township
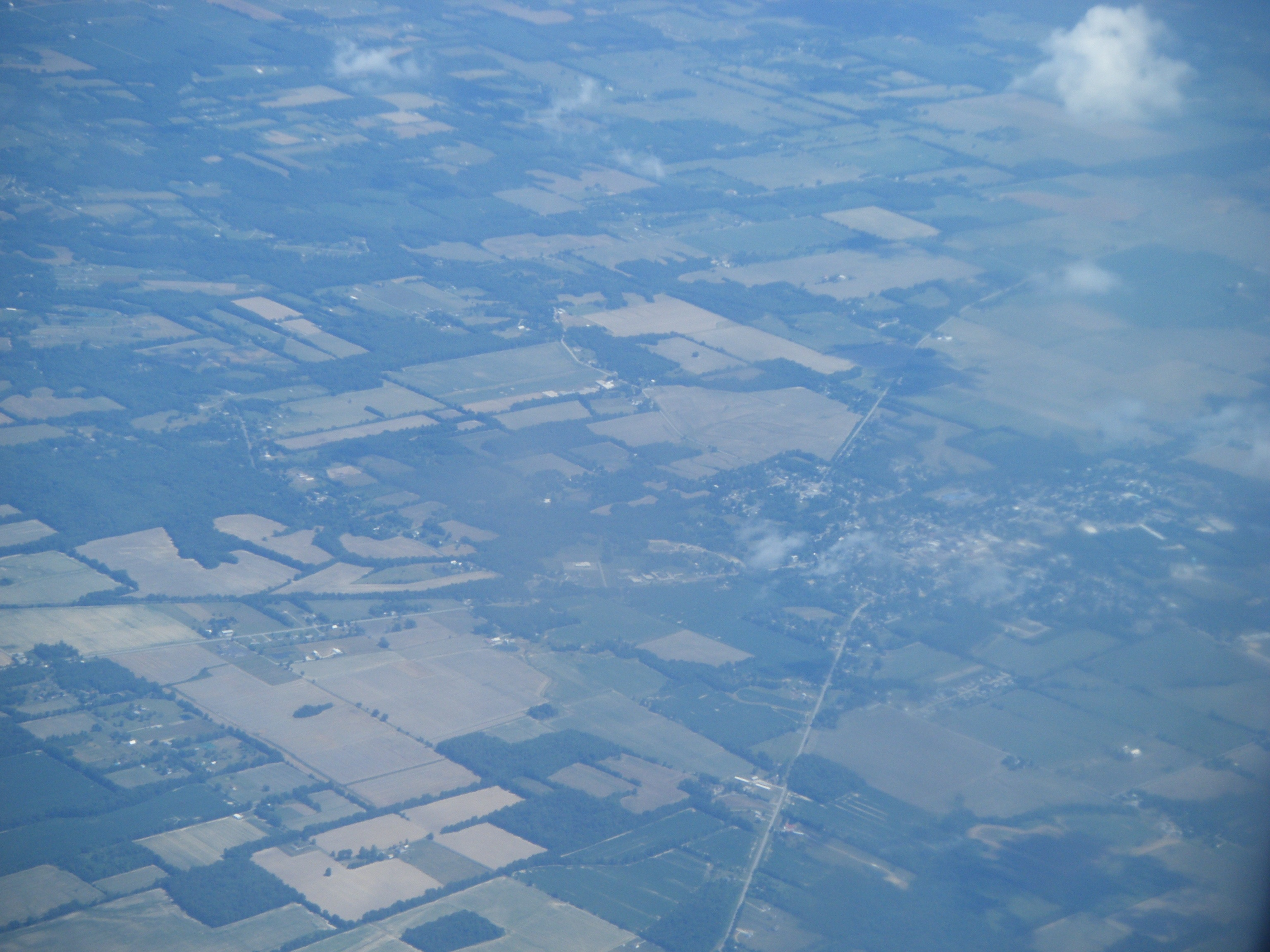
- Fields in the township, with Blanchester at right

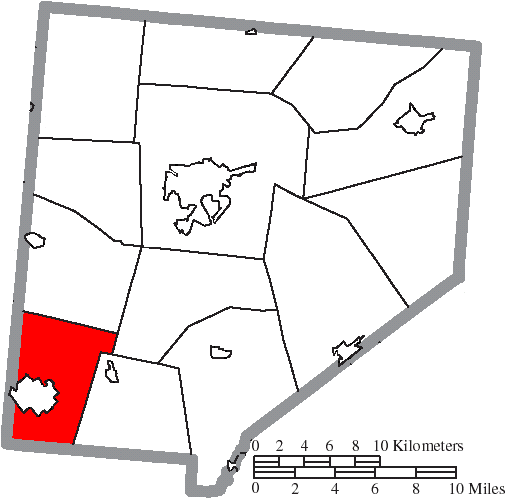
- Location of Marion Township in Clinton County
- Coordinates: 39°17′37″N 83°58′33″W
- Country: United States
- State: Ohio
- County: Clinton

Area
  - Total: 25.5 sq mi (66.0 km^{2})
  - Land: 25.3 sq mi (65.5 km^{2})
  - Water: 0.19 sq mi (0.5 km^{2})
- Elevation: 958 ft (292 m)

Population (2020)
  - Total: 5,520
  - Density: 218/sq mi (84.3/km^{2})
- Time zone: UTC-5 (Eastern (EST))
  - Summer (DST): UTC-4 (EDT)
- FIPS code: 39-47670
- GNIS feature ID: 1085882

Marion Township is one of the thirteen townships of Clinton County, Ohio, United States. The 2020 census reported 5,520 people living in the township.

== Geography ==
Located in the southwest corner of the county, it borders the following townships:

- Vernon Township - north
- Washington Township - northeast
- Jefferson Township - east
- Perry Township, Brown County - south
- Wayne Township, Clermont County - southwest
- Harlan Township, Warren County - west

The entire township lies in the Virginia Military District.

Most of the village of Blanchester is located in western Marion Township.

== Name and history ==
Marion Township was established in 1830.

It is one of twelve Marion Townships statewide.

=== Historic population figures ===
| Year | Marion Township | Blanchester Village |
|---|---|---|
| 1910 | 2,533 | 1,813 |
| 1920 | 2,324 | 1,676 |
| 1930 | 2,192 | 1,597 |
| 1940 | 2,404 | 1,785 |
| 1950 | 2,749 | 2,109 |
| 1960 | 3,853 | 2,944 |
| 1970 | 1,412 | 3,080 |
| 1980 | 2,107 | 3,207 |
| 1990 | 5,186 | 4,206 |
| 2000 | 5,489 | 4,220 |
| 2010 | 5,394 | 4,243 |

== Government ==
The township is governed by a three-member board of trustees, who are elected in November of odd-numbered years to a four-year term beginning on the following January 1. Two are elected in the year after the presidential election and one is elected in the year before it. There is also an elected township fiscal officer, who serves a four-year term beginning on April 1 of the year after the election, which is held in November of the year before the presidential election. Vacancies in the fiscal officership or on the board of trustees are filled by the remaining trustees.
