= Wayne Township, Clermont County, Ohio =

Township in Ohio, US

- Township
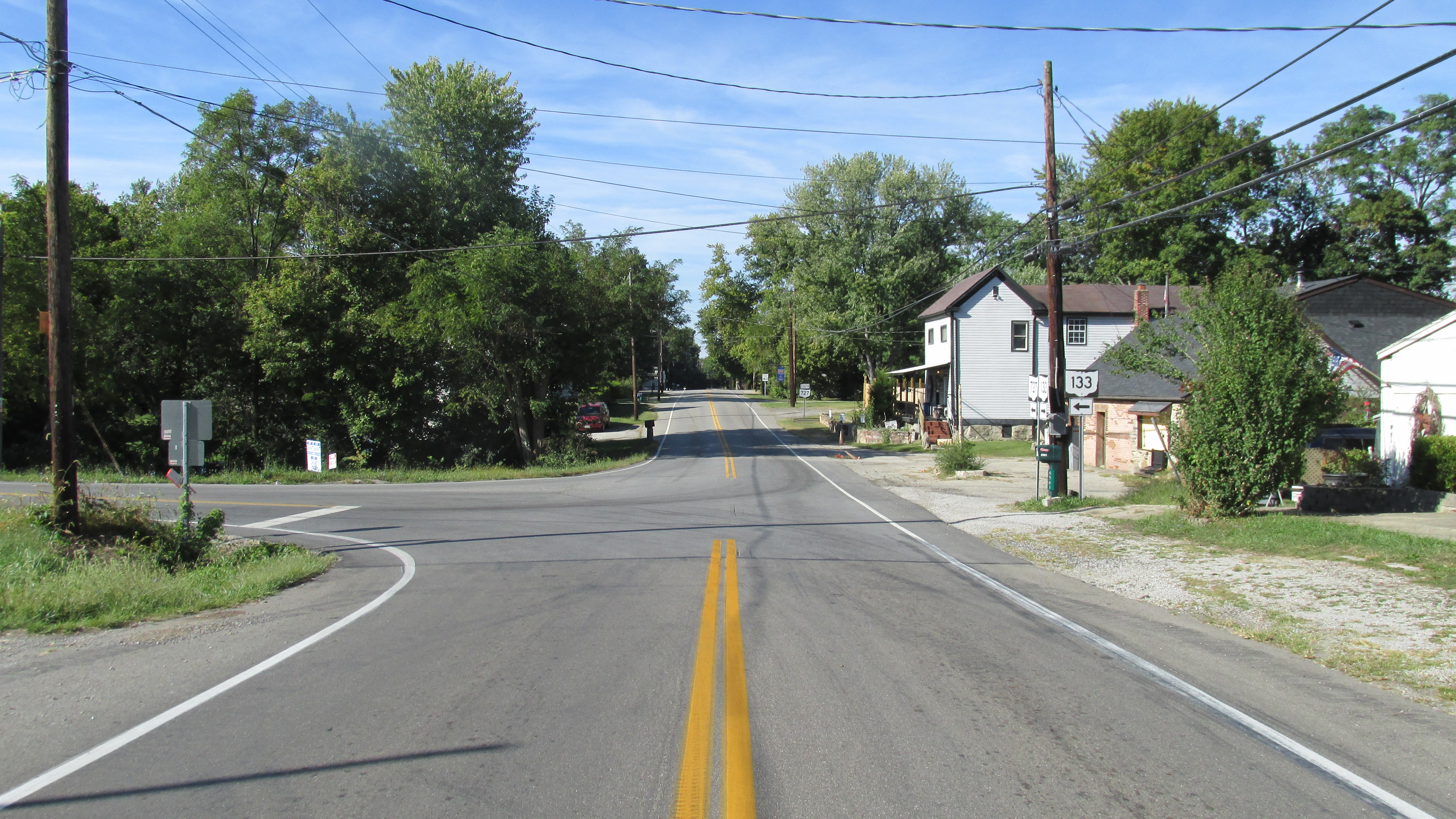
- State Route 727 in Edenton

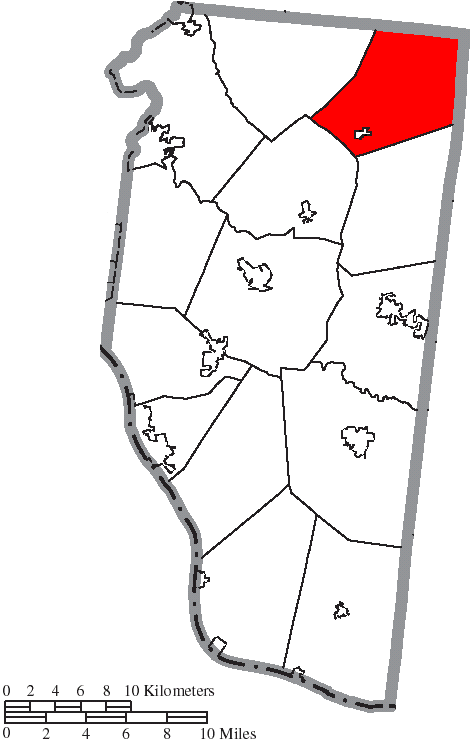
- Location of Wayne Township in Clermont County
- Coordinates: 39°13′3″N 84°3′26″W
- Country: United States
- State: Ohio
- County: Clermont

Area
  - Total: 31.9 sq mi (82.5 km^{2})
  - Land: 31.5 sq mi (81.6 km^{2})
  - Water: 0.35 sq mi (0.9 km^{2})
- Elevation: 899 ft (274 m)

Population (2020)
  - Total: 4,637
  - Density: 155/sq mi (59.9/km^{2})
- Time zone: UTC-5 (Eastern (EST))
  - Summer (DST): UTC-4 (EDT)
- FIPS code: 39-82110
- GNIS feature ID: 1085874
- Website: www.wayne-township.org

Wayne Township is one of the fourteen townships of Clermont County, Ohio, United States. The population was 4,637 at the 2020 census.

== Geography ==
Located in the northeast corner of the county, it borders the following townships:

- Harlan Township, Warren County - north
- Marion Township, Clinton County - northeast
- Perry Township, Brown County - east
- Jackson Township - south
- Stonelick Township - southwest
- Goshen Township - west

The village of Newtonsville is located in southwestern Wayne Township.

== Name and history ==
It is one of 20 Wayne Townships statewide.

== Government ==
The township is governed by a three-member board of trustees, who are elected in November of odd-numbered years to a four-year term beginning on the following January 1. Two are elected in the year after the presidential election and one is elected in the year before it. There is also an elected township fiscal officer, who serves a four-year term beginning on April 1 of the year after the election, which is held in November of the year before the presidential election. Vacancies in the fiscal officership or on the board of trustees are filled by the remaining trustees.
