= Dodson Township, Ohio =

Township in Ohio, US

- Township
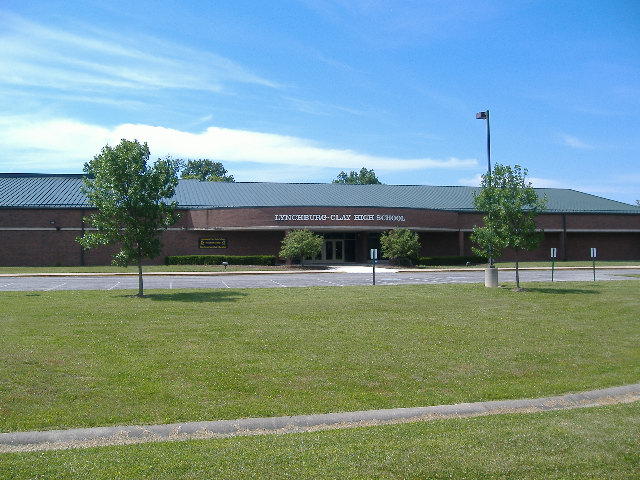
- Lynchburg-Clay High School

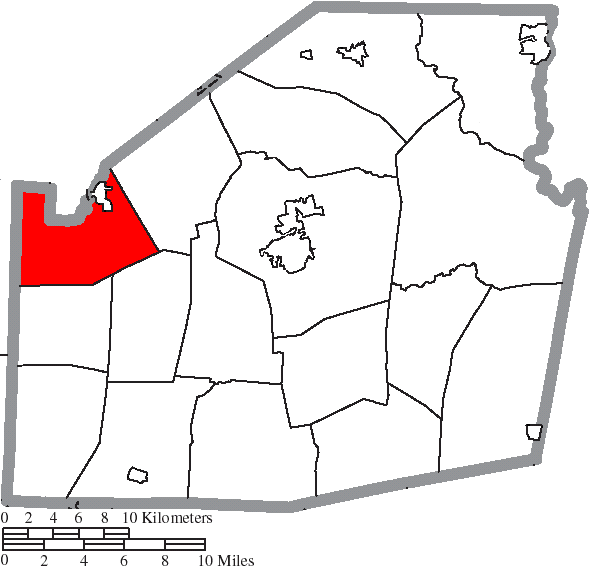
- Location of Dodson Township in Highland County
- Coordinates: 39°13′35″N 83°47′37″W
- Country: United States
- State: Ohio
- County: Highland

Area
  - Total: 26.3 sq mi (68.0 km^{2})
  - Land: 26.2 sq mi (67.8 km^{2})
  - Water: 0.077 sq mi (0.2 km^{2})
- Elevation: 1,020 ft (311 m)

Population (2020)
  - Total: 2,598
  - Density: 99.2/sq mi (38.3/km^{2})
- Time zone: UTC-5 (Eastern (EST))
  - Summer (DST): UTC-4 (EDT)
- FIPS code: 39-22204
- GNIS feature ID: 1086302

Dodson Township is one of the seventeen townships of Highland County, Ohio, United States. As of the 2020 census the population was 2,598.

== Geography ==
Located in the northwestern corner of the county, it borders the following townships:

- Clark Township, Clinton County - north
- Union Township - northeast
- Hamer Township - southeast
- Salem Township - south
- Perry Township, Brown County - west
- Jefferson Township, Clinton County - northwest

Part of the village of Lynchburg is located in northern Dodson Township.

== Name and history ==
Dodson Township derives its name from Joshua Dodson, a government surveyor. It is the only Dodson Township statewide.

== Government ==
The township is governed by a three-member board of trustees, who are elected in November of odd-numbered years to a four-year term beginning on the following January 1. Two are elected in the year after the presidential election and one is elected in the year before it. There is also an elected township fiscal officer, who serves a four-year term beginning on April 1 of the year after the election, which is held in November of the year before the presidential election. Vacancies in the fiscal officership or on the board of trustees are filled by the remaining trustees.
