= Perry Township, Brown County, Ohio =

Township in Ohio, US

- Township
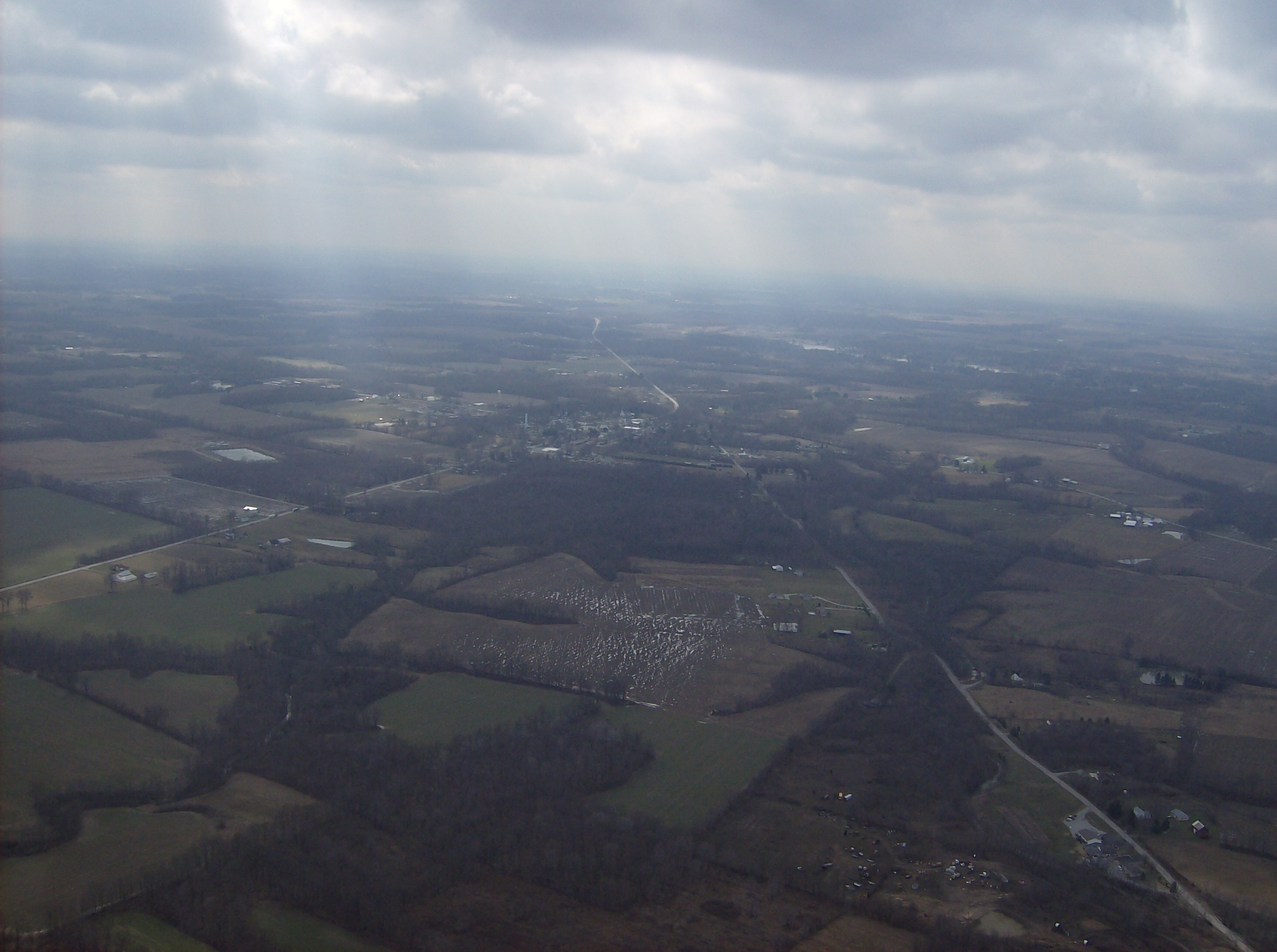
- Countryside in central Perry Township, with Fayetteville in the middle

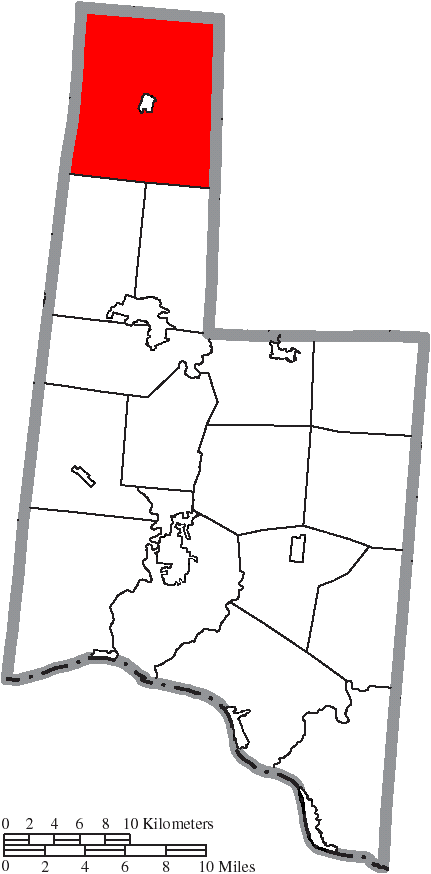
- Location of Perry Township in Brown County
- Coordinates: 39°11′21″N 83°56′7″W
- Country: United States
- State: Ohio
- County: Brown

Area
  - Total: 59.1 sq mi (153.0 km^{2})
  - Land: 58.8 sq mi (152.2 km^{2})
  - Water: 0.31 sq mi (0.8 km^{2})
- Elevation: 938 ft (286 m)

Population (2020)
  - Total: 4,674
  - Density: 79.54/sq mi (30.71/km^{2})
- Time zone: UTC-5 (Eastern (EST))
  - Summer (DST): UTC-4 (EDT)
- FIPS code: 39-61770
- GNIS feature ID: 1085801

Perry Township is one of the sixteen townships of Brown County, Ohio, United States. The 2020 census found 4,674 people in the township.

== Geography ==
Located in the far northern part of the county, it borders the following townships:

- Marion Township, Clinton County - north, west of Jefferson Township
- Jefferson Township, Clinton County - north, east of Marion Township
- Dodson Township, Highland County - east, north of Salem Township
- Salem Township, Highland County - east, south of Dodson Township
- Green Township - south, east of Sterling Township
- Sterling Township - south, west of Green Township
- Jackson Township, Clermont County - west, south of Wayne Township
- Wayne Township, Clermont County - west, north of Jackson Township

The most northerly township in Brown County, it is the only part of the county to border Clinton County.

The village of Fayetteville is located in central Perry Townships, and the census-designated places of St. Martin and Lake Lorelei lie in the township's northeast and west.

== Name and history ==
Perry Township was formed in 1815.

It is one of twenty-six Perry Townships statewide.

== Government ==
The township is governed by a three-member board of trustees, who are elected in November of odd-numbered years to a four-year term beginning on the following January 1. Two are elected in the year after the presidential election and one is elected in the year before it. There is also an elected township fiscal officer, who serves a four-year term beginning on April 1 of the year after the election, which is held in November of the year before the presidential election. Vacancies in the fiscal officership or on the board of trustees are filled by the remaining trustees.
