= Stonelick Township, Clermont County, Ohio =

Township in Ohio, US

- Township
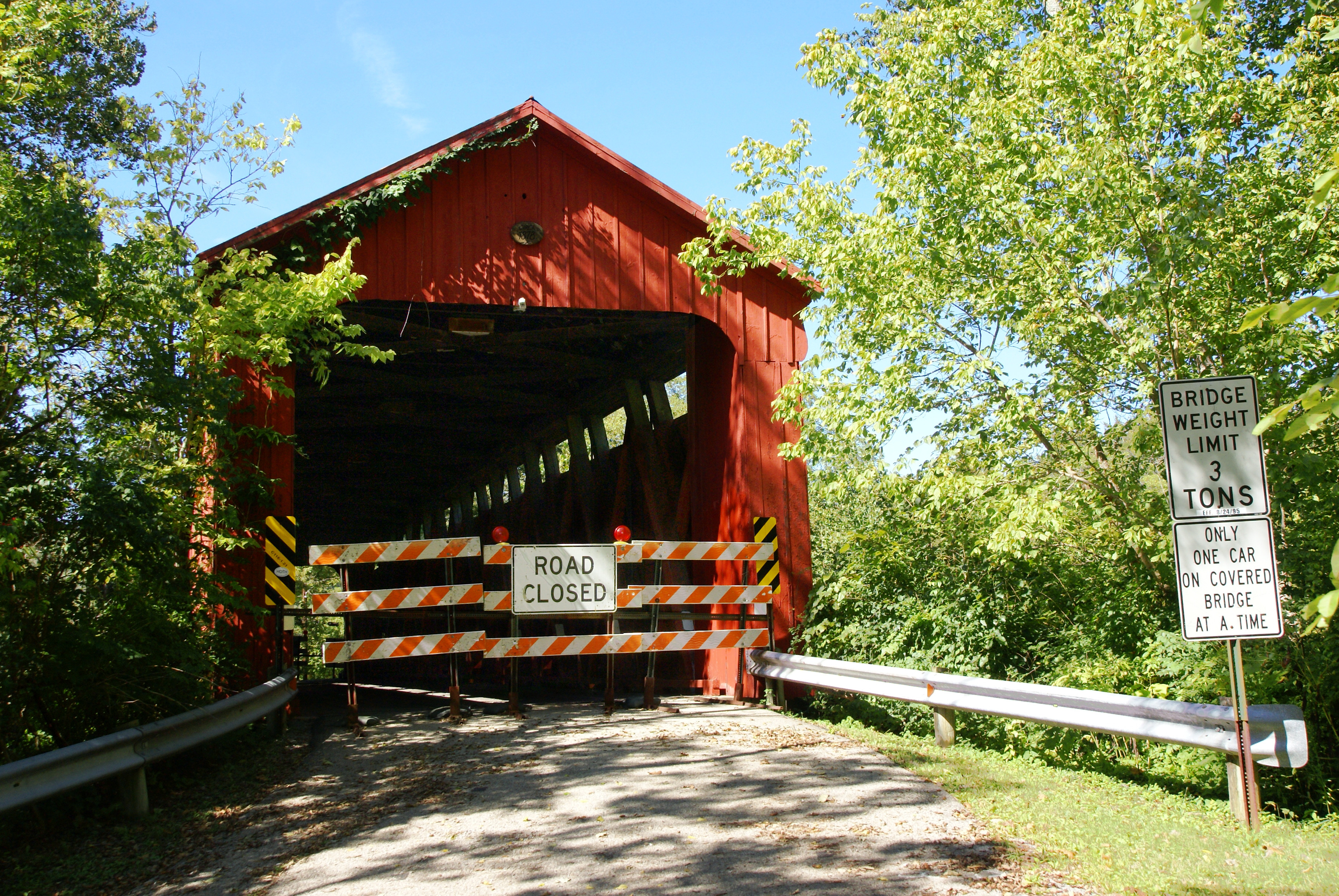
- Stonelick Covered Bridge

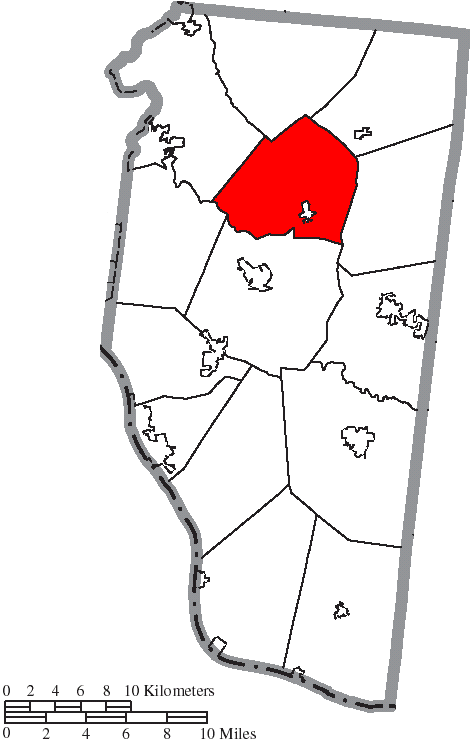
- Location of Stonelick Township in Clermont County
- Coordinates: 39°8′18″N 84°9′5″W
- Country: United States
- State: Ohio
- County: Clermont

Area
  - Total: 29.7 sq mi (76.8 km^{2})
  - Land: 29.5 sq mi (76.4 km^{2})
  - Water: 0.15 sq mi (0.4 km^{2})
- Elevation: 791 ft (241 m)

Population (2020)
  - Total: 5,663
  - Density: 200/sq mi (77.1/km^{2})
- Time zone: UTC-5 (Eastern (EST))
  - Summer (DST): UTC-4 (EDT)
- ZIP code: 45103
- Area code: 513
- FIPS code: 39-74825
- GNIS feature ID: 1085870
- Website: www.stonelicktwp.org

Stonelick Township is one of the fourteen townships of Clermont County, Ohio, United States. The population was 5,663 at the 2020 census.

== Geography ==
Located in the northern part of the county, Stonelick borders the townships of:

- Goshen Township (to north)
- Wayne Township (to northeast)
- Jackson Township (to east)
- Batavia Township (to south)
- Union Township (to southwest)
- Miami Township (to west)

The village of Owensville is in southern Stonelick Township.

== Name and history ==
Stonelick Township was organized in 1812. It is the only Stonelick Township in Ohio.

== Government ==
The township is governed by a three-member board of trustees, who are elected in November of odd-numbered years to a four-year term beginning on the following January 1. Two are elected in the year after the presidential election and one is elected in the year before it. There is also an elected township fiscal officer, who serves a four-year term beginning on April 1 of the year after the election, which is held in November of the year before the presidential election. Vacancies in the fiscal officership or on the board of trustees are filled by the remaining trustees.
