= Owensville, Ohio =

- Village
- Village of Owensville
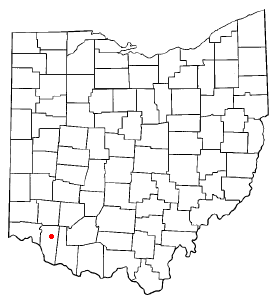
- Location of Owensville, Ohio

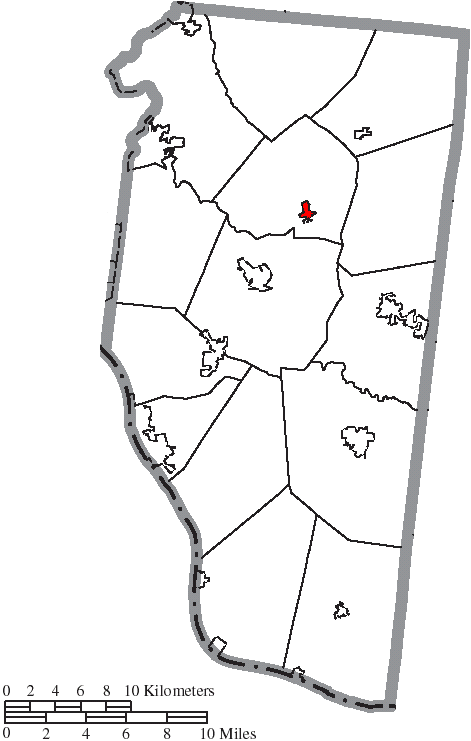
- Location of Owensville in Clermont County
- Coordinates: 39°07′25″N 84°08′11″W
- Country: United States
- State: Ohio
- County: Clermont
- Township: Stonelick

Government
  - Mayor: Rick McEvoy

Area
  - Total: 0.62 sq mi (1.60 km^{2})
  - Land: 0.62 sq mi (1.60 km^{2})
  - Water: 0 sq mi (0.00 km^{2})
- Elevation: 866 ft (264 m)

Population (2020)
  - Total: 786
  - Density: 1,271.6/sq mi (490.98/km^{2})
- Time zone: UTC-5 (Eastern (EST))
  - Summer (DST): UTC-4 (EDT)
- ZIP code: 45160
- Area code: 513
- FIPS code: 39-59220
- GNIS feature ID: 2399604
- Website: owensvilleoh.gov

Owensville is a village in Clermont County, Ohio, United States. The population was 786 at the 2020 census.

== History ==
Owensville was called Boston, and under the latter name was platted in 1836. A post office called Owensville has been in operation since 1832. The present name is derived from Mr. Owens, the first postmaster.

== Geography ==
According to the United States Census Bureau, the village has a total area of 0.43 square miles (1.11 km^{2}), all land.

== Demographics ==
Historical population
Census	Pop.	Note	%±
1860	357		—
1870	377		5.6%
1880	307		−18.6%
1890	292		−4.9%
1900	260		−11.0%
1910	289		11.2%
1920	295		2.1%
1930	333		12.9%
1940	334		0.3%
1950	419		25.4%
1960	609		45.3%
1970	707		16.1%
1980	858		21.4%
1990	1,019		18.8%
2000	816		−19.9%
2010	794		−2.7%
2020	786		−1.0%
U.S. Decennial Census

=== 2010 census ===
From the census of 2010, there were 794 people, 387 households, and 196 families living in the village. The population density was 1,846.5 inhabitants per square mile (712.9/km^{2}). There were 429 housing units at an average density of 997.7 per square mile (385.2/km^{2}). The racial makeup of the village was 97.9% White, 0.1% African American, 0.3% Asian, and 1.8% from two or more races. Hispanic or Latino of any race were 0.8% of the population.

There were 387 households, of which 24.5% had children under the age of 18 living with them, 34.4% were married couples living together, 12.1% had a female householder with no husband present, 4.1% had a male householder with no wife present, and 49.4% were non-families. 45.0% of all households were made up of individuals, and 18.9% had someone living alone who was 65 years of age or older. The average household size was 2.05 and the average family size was 2.88.

The median age in the village was 44.3 years. 20.9% of residents were under the age of 18; 9.3% were between the ages of 18 and 24; 19.9% were from 25 to 44; 31.4% were from 45 to 64; and 18.4% were 65 years of age or older. The gender makeup of the village was 45.3% male and 54.7% female.

=== 2000 census ===
From the census of 2000, there were 816 people, 361 households, and 188 families living in the village. The population density was 2,061.7 inhabitants per square mile (796.0/km^{2}). There were 381 housing units at an average density of 962.6 per square mile (371.7/km^{2}). The racial makeup of the village was 97.67% White, 0.61% African American, 0.12% Asian, 0.25% Pacific Islander, and 1.35% from two or more races. Hispanic or Latino of any race were 1.23% of the population.

There were 361 households, out of which 29.9% had children under the age of 18 living with them, 34.1% were married couples living together, 14.7% had a female householder with no husband present, and 47.9% were non-families. 44.0% of all households were made up of individuals, and 24.9% had someone living alone who was 65 years of age or older. The average household size was 2.26 and the average family size was 3.24.

In the village, the population was spread out, with 27.7% under the age of 18, 9.8% from 18 to 24, 24.3% from 25 to 44, 20.8% from 45 to 64, and 17.4% who were 65 years of age or older. The median age was 36 years. For every 100 females there were 83.0 males. For every 100 females age 18 and above, there were 73.0 males.

The median income for a household in the village was $24,097, and the median income for a family was $41,625. Males had a median income of $33,625 compared to $26,563 for females. The per capita income for the village was $14,725. About 11.4% of families and 18.6% of the population were below the poverty line, including 20.9% of those under age 18 and 24.8% of those age 65 or above.

== Education ==
Owensville has a public library, a branch of the Clermont County Public Library.

== Gallery ==
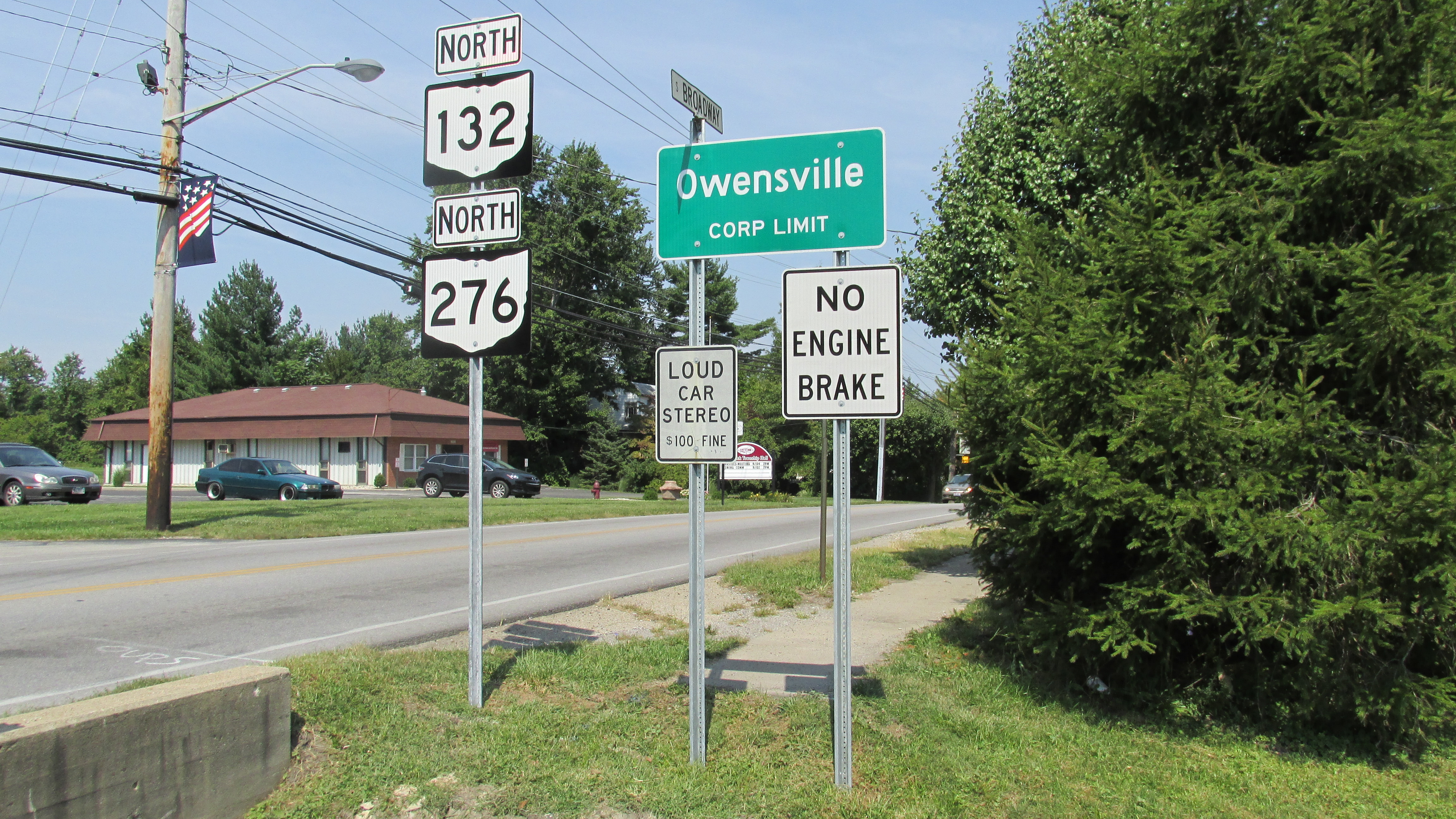
Owensville corporation limit sign.

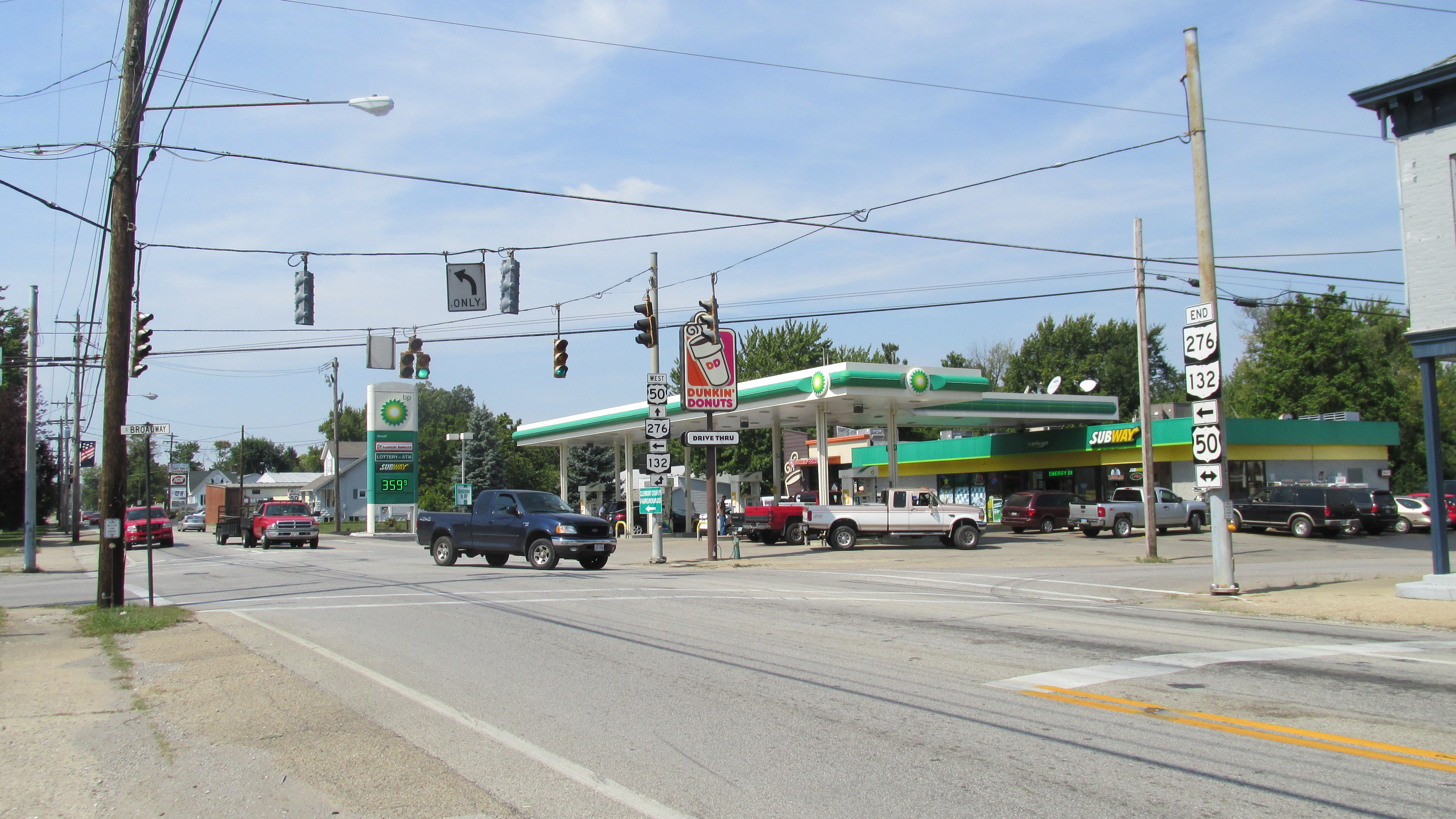
Intersection of Main Street (US Highway 50) and Broadway Street (Ohio Highway 132/276) in Owensville.

== Possible Disbanding ==
In the 2021 election, an issue was proposed that the village should disband. Residents would no longer pay a 1% tax, and the police force of 12 officers would be disbanded, leaving the community to rely instead on the Clermont County sheriff's department. This measure failed with nearly 70% of voters voting against the measure.
