= Goshen Township, Clermont County, Ohio =

Township in Ohio, US

- Township
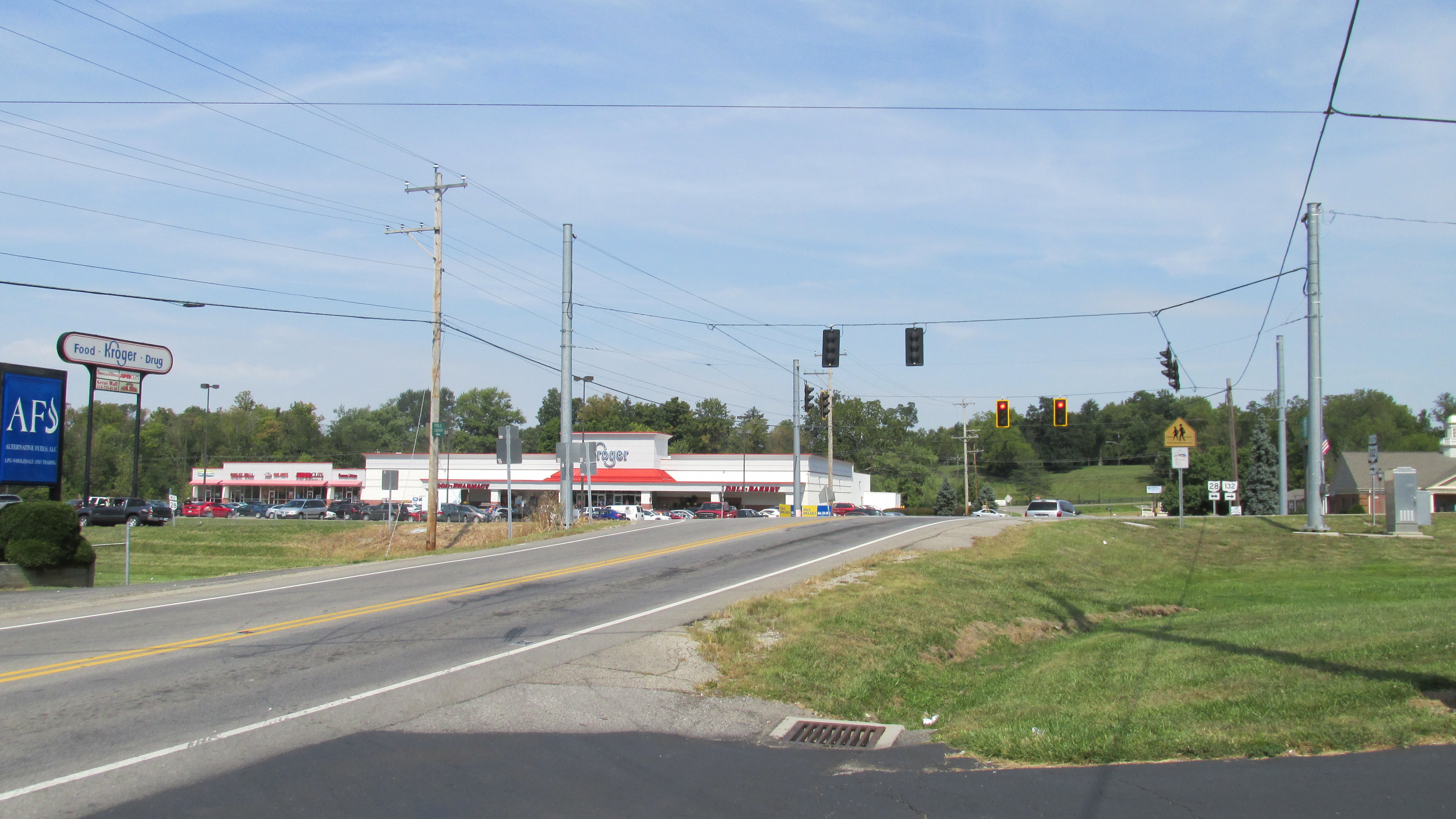
- Suburban development at the community of Goshen

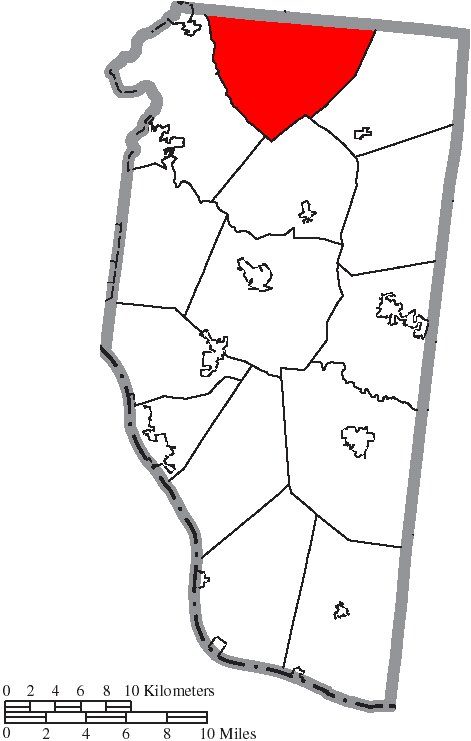
- Location of Goshen Township in Clermont County
- Coordinates: 39°14′1″N 84°10′5″W
- Country: United States
- State: Ohio
- County: Clermont

Area
  - Total: 34.2 sq mi (88.6 km^{2})
  - Land: 34.1 sq mi (88.3 km^{2})
  - Water: 0.15 sq mi (0.4 km^{2})
- Elevation: 850 ft (259 m)

Population (2020)
  - Total: 16,057
  - Density: 455/sq mi (175.6/km^{2})
- Time zone: UTC-5 (Eastern (EST))
  - Summer (DST): UTC-4 (EDT)
- ZIP code: 45122
- Area code: 513
- FIPS code: 39-31010
- GNIS feature ID: 1085863
- Website: www.goshen-oh.gov

Goshen Township is one of the fourteen townships of Clermont County, Ohio, United States. The population was 16,057 at the 2020 census.

== Geography ==
Located in the northern part of the county, it borders the following townships:

- Harlan Township, Warren County – northeast
- Wayne Township – east
- Stonelick Township – south
- Miami Township – west
- Hamilton Township, Warren County – northwest

No municipalities are located in Goshen Township, although the census-designated place of Goshen lies in the township's center.

== Name and history ==
It is one of seven Goshen Townships statewide.

On July 6, 2022 Goshen Township and some surrounding areas were devastated by a EF-2 tornado. This tornado went through the heart of Goshen Township, striking the main fire station, the police department, & the township office building. The township office building also serves as the communities tornado shelter. The main fire station suffered severe damage with partial collapse of the building. The tornado continued on a southeast track through Goshen Township, destroying several homes and causing damage to all of the school buildings located on the Goshen local school district grounds.

== Government ==
The township is governed by a three-member board of trustees, who are elected in November of odd-numbered years to a four-year term beginning on the following January 1. Two are elected in the year after the presidential election and one is elected in the year before it. There is also an elected township fiscal officer, who serves a four-year term beginning on April 1 of the year after the election, which is held in November of the year before the presidential election. Vacancies in the fiscal officership or on the board of trustees are filled by the remaining trustees.
