= New Vienna, Ohio =

- Village
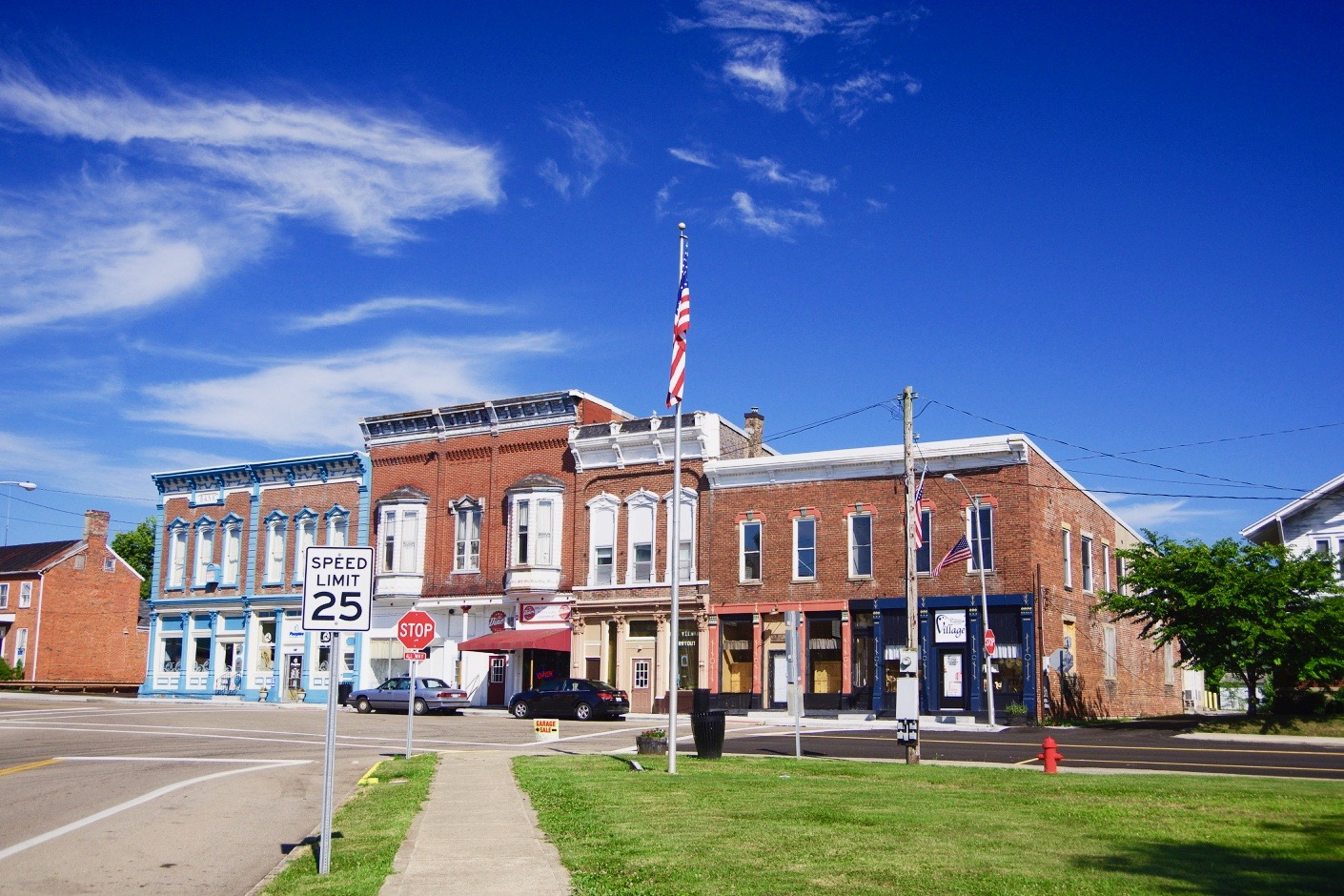
- Intersection of Main and West (SR 28)

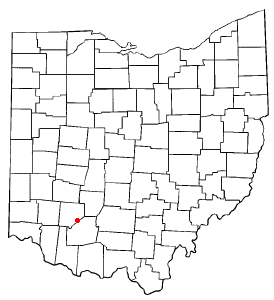
- Location of New Vienna, Ohio

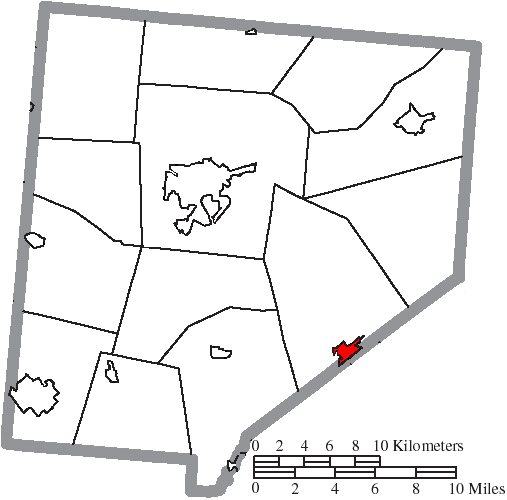
- Location of New Vienna in Clinton County
- Coordinates: 39°19′32″N 83°41′39″W
- Country: United States
- State: Ohio
- County: Clinton

Government
  - Mayor: Kathy Stone

Area
  - Total: 0.82 sq mi (2.13 km^{2})
  - Land: 0.80 sq mi (2.08 km^{2})
  - Water: 0.019 sq mi (0.05 km^{2})
- Elevation: 1,112 ft (339 m)

Population (2020)
  - Total: 1,108
  - Density: 1,381.3/sq mi (533.34/km^{2})
- Time zone: UTC-5 (Eastern (EST))
  - Summer (DST): UTC-4 (EDT)
- ZIP code: 45159
- Area codes: 937, 326
- FIPS code: 39-55748
- GNIS feature ID: 2399484
- Website: http://newvienna.net/

Historical population
Census	Pop.	Note	%±
1860	580		—
1870	573		−1.2%
1880	797		39.1%
1890	871		9.3%
1900	805		−7.6%
1910	793		−1.5%
1920	704		−11.2%
1930	628		−10.8%
1940	752		19.7%
1950	807		7.3%
1960	858		6.3%
1970	849		−1.0%
1980	1,133		33.5%
1990	922		−18.6%
2000	1,294		40.3%
2010	1,224		−5.4%
2020	1,108		−9.5%
U.S. Decennial Census

New Vienna is a village in Clinton County, Ohio, United States. The population was 1,108 at the 2020 census.

== History ==
New Vienna was originally called Buzzard's Glory, and under the latter name was laid out in 1835.

== Geography ==
According to the United States Census Bureau, the village has a total area of 0.87 square miles (2.25 km^{2}), of which 0.85 square miles (2.20 km^{2}) is land and 0.02 square miles (0.05 km^{2}) is water.

== Demographics ==
=== 2010 census ===
As of the census of 2010, there were 1,224 people, 478 households, and 322 families living in the village. The population density was 1,440.0 inhabitants per square mile (556.0/km^{2}). There were 557 housing units at an average density of 655.3 per square mile (253.0/km^{2}). The racial makeup of the village was 96.7% White, 0.8% African American, 0.4% Native American, 0.3% Asian, 0.5% from other races, and 1.2% from two or more races. Hispanic or Latino of any race were 0.7% of the population.

There were 478 households, of which 35.8% had children under the age of 18 living with them, 45.4% were married couples living together, 15.7% had a female householder with no husband present, 6.3% had a male householder with no wife present, and 32.6% were non-families. 27.0% of all households were made up of individuals, and 11.3% had someone living alone who was 65 years of age or older. The average household size was 2.56 and the average family size was 3.03.

The median age in the village was 35.7 years. 26.5% of residents were under the age of 18; 7.3% were between the ages of 18 and 24; 29.2% were from 25 to 44; 26.3% were from 45 to 64; and 10.8% were 65 years of age or older. The gender makeup of the village was 47.9% male and 52.1% female.

=== 2000 census ===
As of the census of 2000, there were 1,294 people, 497 households, and 330 families living in the village. The population density was 1,619.0 inhabitants per square mile (625.1/km^{2}). There were 555 housing units at an average density of 694.4 per square mile (268.1/km^{2}). The racial makeup of the village was 97.76% White, 0.31% African American, 1.08% Native American, 0.08% Asian, 0.31% from other races, and 0.46% from two or more races. Hispanic or Latino of any race were 0.77% of the population.

There were 497 households, out of which 38.6% had children under the age of 18 living with them, 46.9% were married couples living together, 13.7% had a female householder with no husband present, and 33.6% were non-families. 27.8% of all households were made up of individuals, and 10.9% had someone living alone who was 65 years of age or older. The average household size was 2.60 and the average family size was 3.16.

In the village, the population was spread out, with 31.0% under the age of 18, 9.7% from 18 to 24, 30.4% from 25 to 44, 19.6% from 45 to 64, and 9.4% who were 65 years of age or older. The median age was 32 years. For every 100 females there were 83.5 males. For every 100 females age 18 and over, there were 84.1 males.

The median income for a household in the village was $31,750, and the median income for a family was $36,339. Males had a median income of $31,471 versus $21,042 for females. The per capita income for the village was $13,966. About 9.1% of families and 10.8% of the population were below the poverty line, including 13.8% of those under age 18 and 6.7% of those age 65 or over.

== Notable people ==
- Chuck Collier, longtime disc jockey at radio stations WGAR (AM) (1970–1990) and WGAR-FM (1986–2011) in Cleveland, Ohio
- Julius Houseman, former mayor of Grand Rapids, Michigan, member of the Michigan House of Representatives, and member of the U.S. House of Representatives
- James G. Polk, Democratic Party politician

== Gallery ==
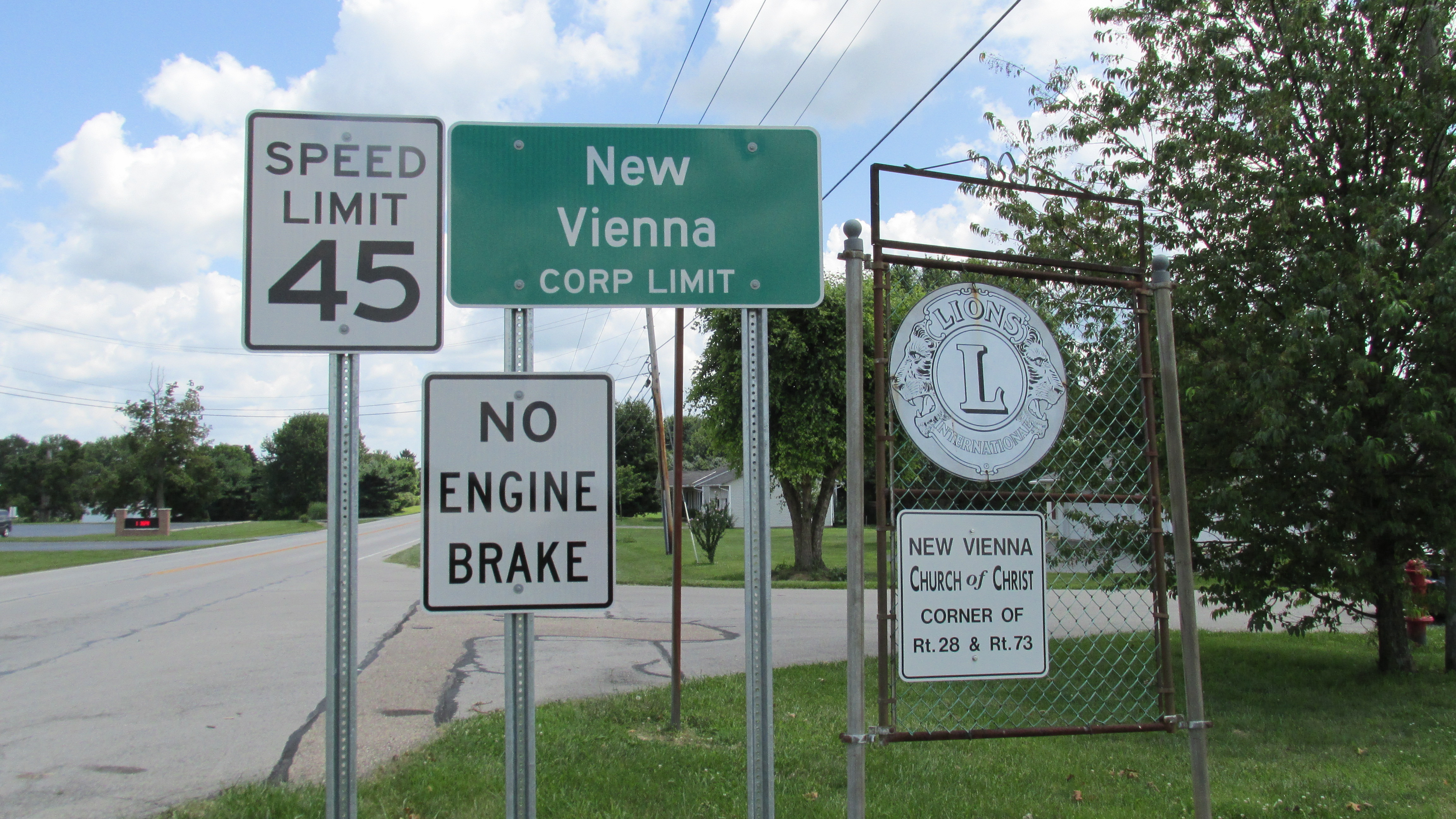
New Vienna corporation limit sign

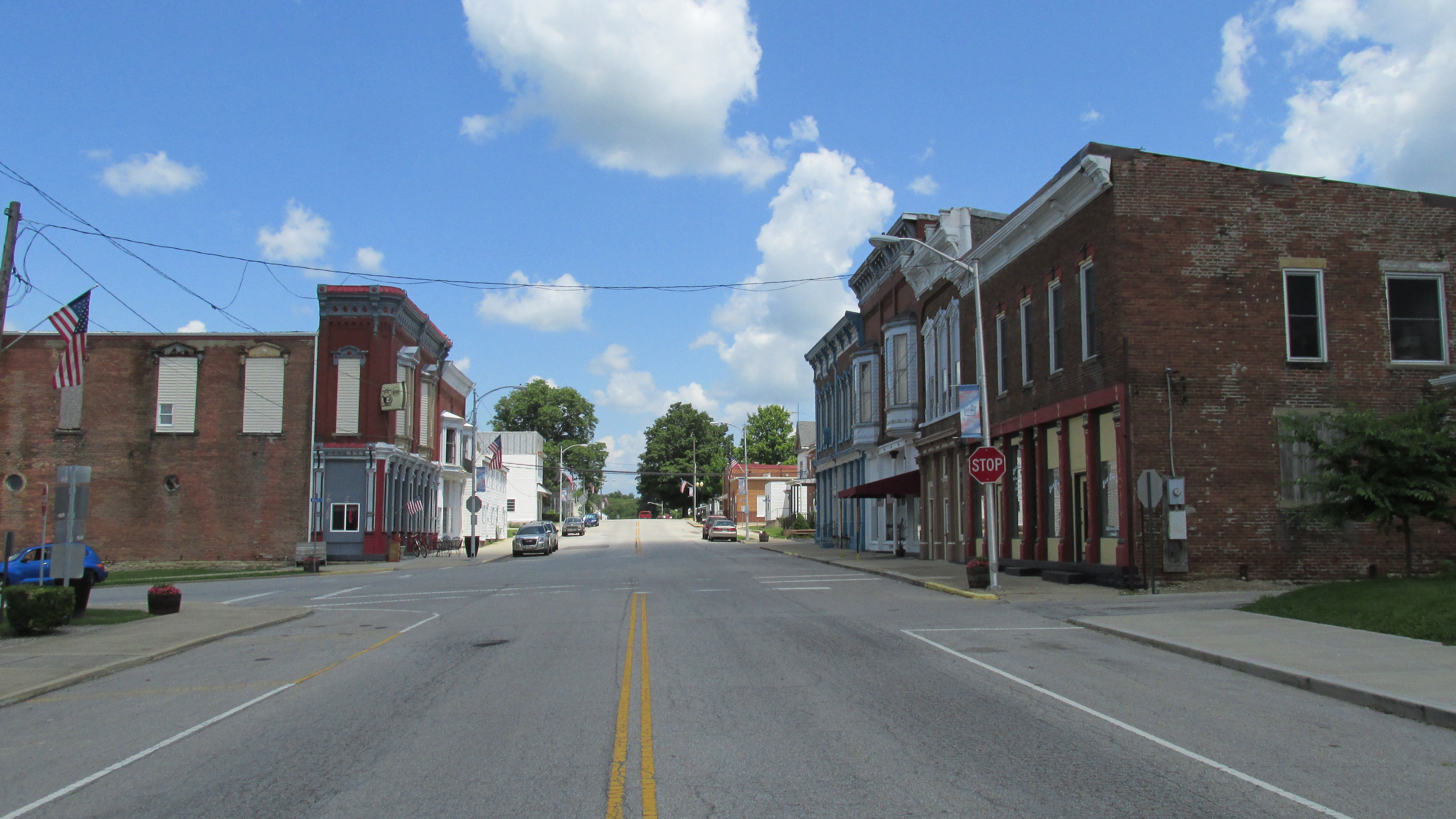
Looking northeast on Main Street (central business district)

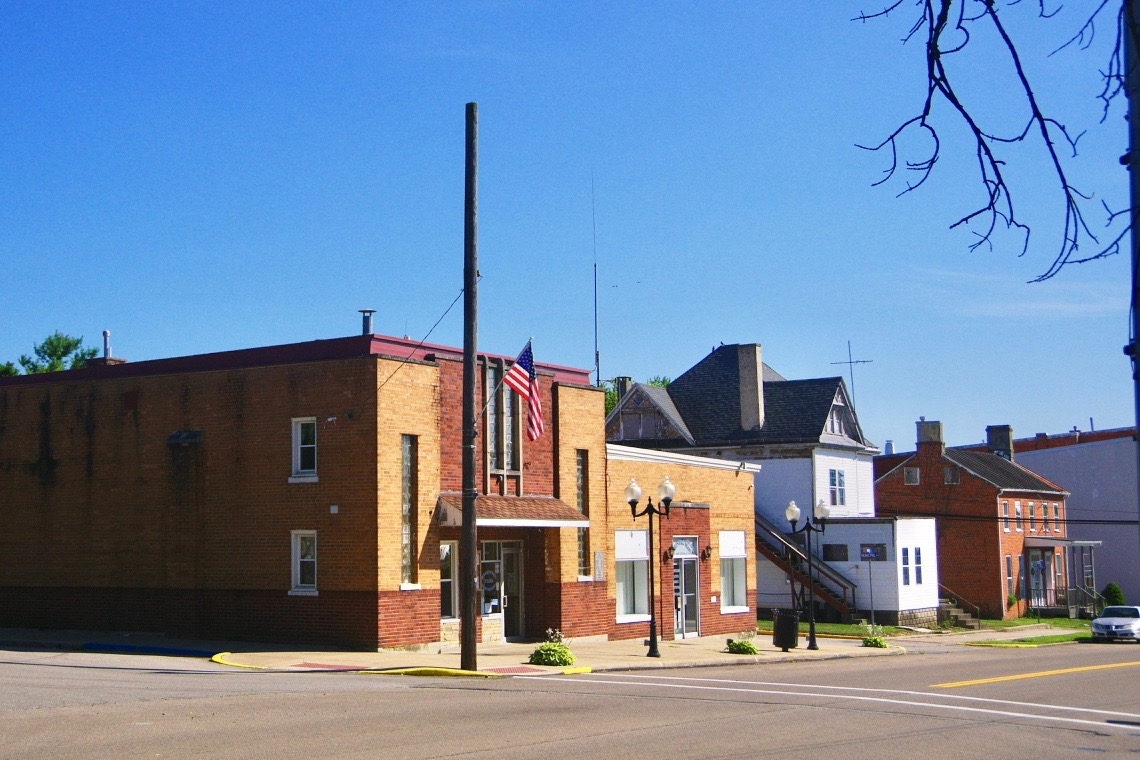
New Vienna Municipal Building
