= Clark Township, Clinton County, Ohio =

Township in Ohio, US

- Township
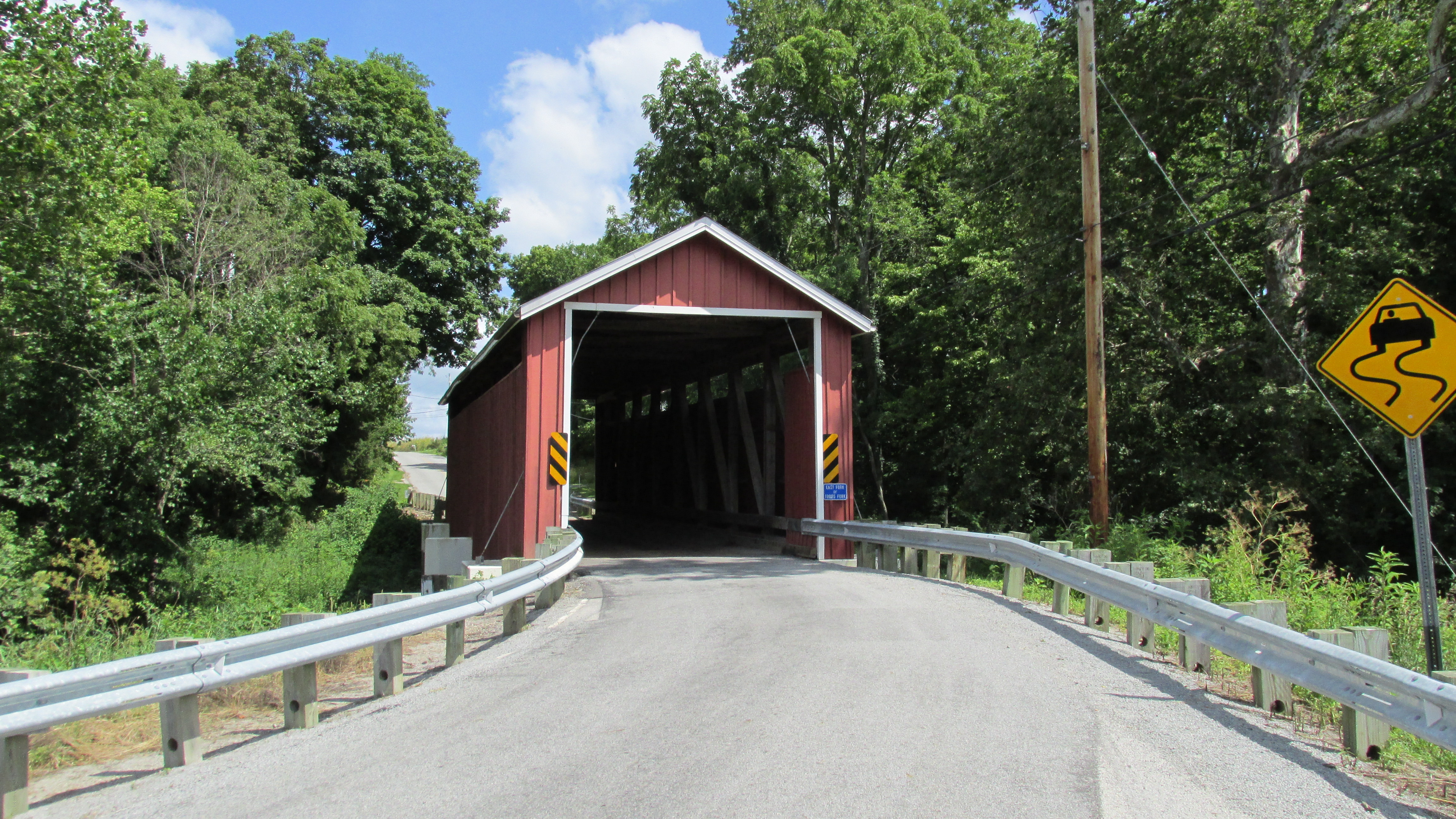
- Martinsville Road Covered Bridge

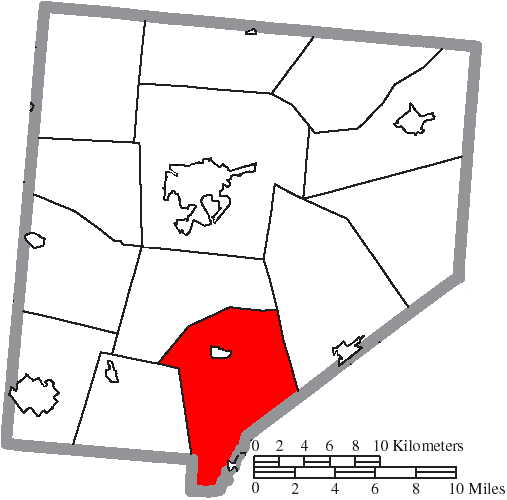
- Location of Clark Township in Clinton County
- Coordinates: 39°19′8″N 83°47′59″W
- Country: United States
- State: Ohio
- County: Clinton

Area
  - Total: 36.9 sq mi (95.6 km^{2})
  - Land: 36.7 sq mi (95.1 km^{2})
  - Water: 0.19 sq mi (0.5 km^{2})
- Elevation: 1,073 ft (327 m)

Population (2020)
  - Total: 2,014
  - Density: 54.9/sq mi (21.2/km^{2})
- Time zone: UTC-5 (Eastern (EST))
  - Summer (DST): UTC-4 (EDT)
- FIPS code: 39-15238
- GNIS feature ID: 1085878

Clark Township is one of the thirteen townships of Clinton County, Ohio, United States. The 2020 census reported 2,014 people living in the township.

== Geography ==
Located in the southern part of the county, it borders the following townships:

- Washington Township - north
- Green Township - northeast
- Union Township, Highland County - southeast
- Dodson Township, Highland County - south
- Jefferson Township - southwest

The entire township lies in the Virginia Military District. Clinton County's "bootheel", the odd piece of land jutting into Highland County, added to bring Clinton County to the constitutionally mandated 400-square-mile (1,000 km^{2}) area, is in the township.

The village of Martinsville is located in northern Clark Township.

== Name and history ==
Statewide, other Clark Townships are located in Brown, Coshocton, and Holmes counties.

== Government ==
The township is governed by a three-member board of trustees, who are elected in November of odd-numbered years to a four-year term beginning on the following January 1. Two are elected in the year after the presidential election and one is elected in the year before it. There is also an elected township fiscal officer, who serves a four-year term beginning on April 1 of the year after the election, which is held in November of the year before the presidential election. The trustees and clerk are chosen in non-partisan elections. Vacancies in the fiscal officership or on the board of trustees are filled by the remaining trustees.
