= Clarksville, Ohio =

- Village
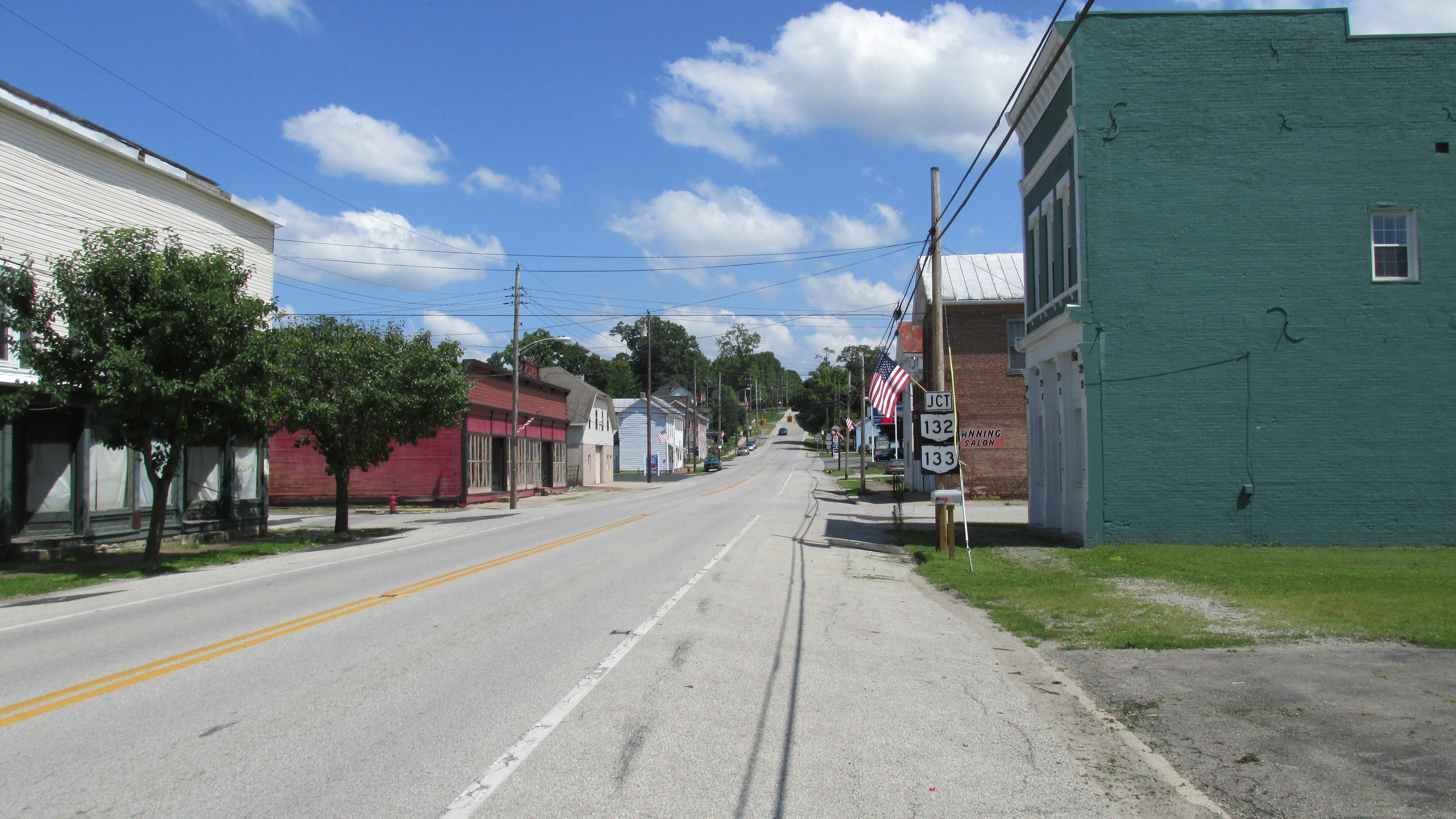
- Looking east on Main Street (Ohio State Route 350) in Clarksville

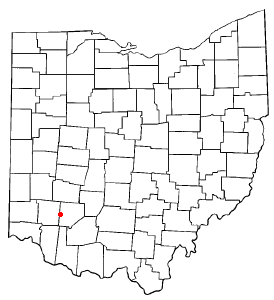
- Location of Clarksville, Ohio

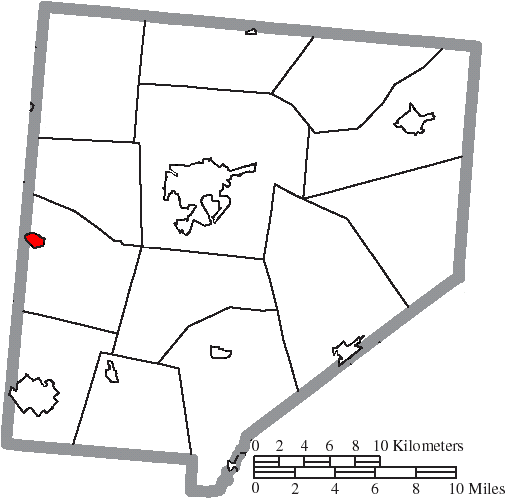
- Location of Clarksville in Clinton County
- Coordinates: 39°24′06″N 83°58′59″W
- Country: United States
- State: Ohio
- County: Clinton

Area
  - Total: 0.49 sq mi (1.28 km^{2})
  - Land: 0.47 sq mi (1.21 km^{2})
  - Water: 0.027 sq mi (0.07 km^{2})
- Elevation: 814 ft (248 m)

Population (2020)
  - Total: 534
  - Estimate (2023): 535
  - Density: 1,147.0/sq mi (442.84/km^{2})
- Time zone: UTC-5 (Eastern (EST))
  - Summer (DST): UTC-4 (EDT)
- ZIP code: 45113
- Area codes: 937, 326
- FIPS code: 39-15406
- GNIS feature ID: 2397633

Clarksville is a village in Clinton County, Ohio, United States. The population was 534 at the 2020 census. It is served by the Clinton Massie branch of the Wilmington Public Library of Clinton County.

== History ==
Clarksville was laid out in 1816. The village was named after Sarah Clark Hadley, the wife of an early settler.

== Geography ==
According to the United States Census Bureau, the village has a total area of 0.49 square miles (1.27 km^{2}), of which 0.46 square miles (1.19 km^{2}) is land and 0.03 square miles (0.08 km^{2}) is water.

== Demographics ==
Historical population
Census	Pop.	Note	%±
1870	389		—
1880	367		−5.7%
1890	339		−7.6%
1900	465		37.2%
1910	425		−8.6%
1920	410		−3.5%
1930	401		−2.2%
1940	430		7.2%
1950	510		18.6%
1960	583		14.3%
1970	574		−1.5%
1980	525		−8.5%
1990	485		−7.6%
2000	497		2.5%
2010	548		10.3%
2020	534		−2.6%
2023 (est.)	535	▲	0.2%
U.S. Decennial Census

=== 2010 census ===
As of the census of 2010, there were 548 people, 204 households, and 145 families living in the village. The population density was 1,191.3 inhabitants per square mile (460.0/km^{2}). There were 238 housing units at an average density of 517.4 per square mile (199.8/km^{2}). The racial makeup of the village was 96.0% White, 0.2% Native American, 2.2% Asian, 0.9% from other races, and 0.7% from two or more races. Hispanic or Latino of any race were 0.9% of the population.

There were 204 households, of which 42.2% had children under the age of 18 living with them, 43.6% were married couples living together, 16.2% had a female householder with no husband present, 11.3% had a male householder with no wife present, and 28.9% were non-families. 22.1% of all households were made up of individuals, and 7.4% had someone living alone who was 65 years of age or older. The average household size was 2.69 and the average family size was 3.12.

The median age in the village was 31.5 years. 31.4% of residents were under the age of 18; 8.3% were between the ages of 18 and 24; 28.4% were from 25 to 44; 24.5% were from 45 to 64; and 7.3% were 65 years of age or older. The gender makeup of the village was 51.3% male and 48.7% female.

=== 2000 census ===
As of the census of 2000, there were 497 people, 191 households, and 136 families living in the village. The population density was 1,023.7 inhabitants per square mile (395.3/km^{2}). There were 216 housing units at an average density of 444.9 per square mile (171.8/km^{2}). The racial makeup of the village was 96.58% White, 0.40% African American, 1.01% Native American, 0.20% Asian, 0.20% from other races, and 1.61% from two or more races. Hispanic or Latino of any race were 1.01% of the population.

There were 191 households, out of which 40.3% had children under the age of 18 living with them, 51.8% were married couples living together, 13.1% had a female householder with no husband present, and 28.3% were non-families. 22.5% of all households were made up of individuals, and 6.3% had someone living alone who was 65 years of age or older. The average household size was 2.60 and the average family size was 3.02.

In the village, the population was spread out, with 28.2% under the age of 18, 9.7% from 18 to 24, 33.8% from 25 to 44, 18.3% from 45 to 64, and 10.1% who were 65 years of age or older. The median age was 31 years. For every 100 females there were 89.7 males. For every 100 females age 18 and over, there were 89.9 males.

The median income for a household in the village was $32,250, and the median income for a family was $39,375. Males had a median income of $31,875 versus $21,328 for females. The per capita income for the village was $14,448. About 6.2% of families and 9.0% of the population were below the poverty line, including 7.3% of those under age 18 and 8.3% of those age 65 or over.

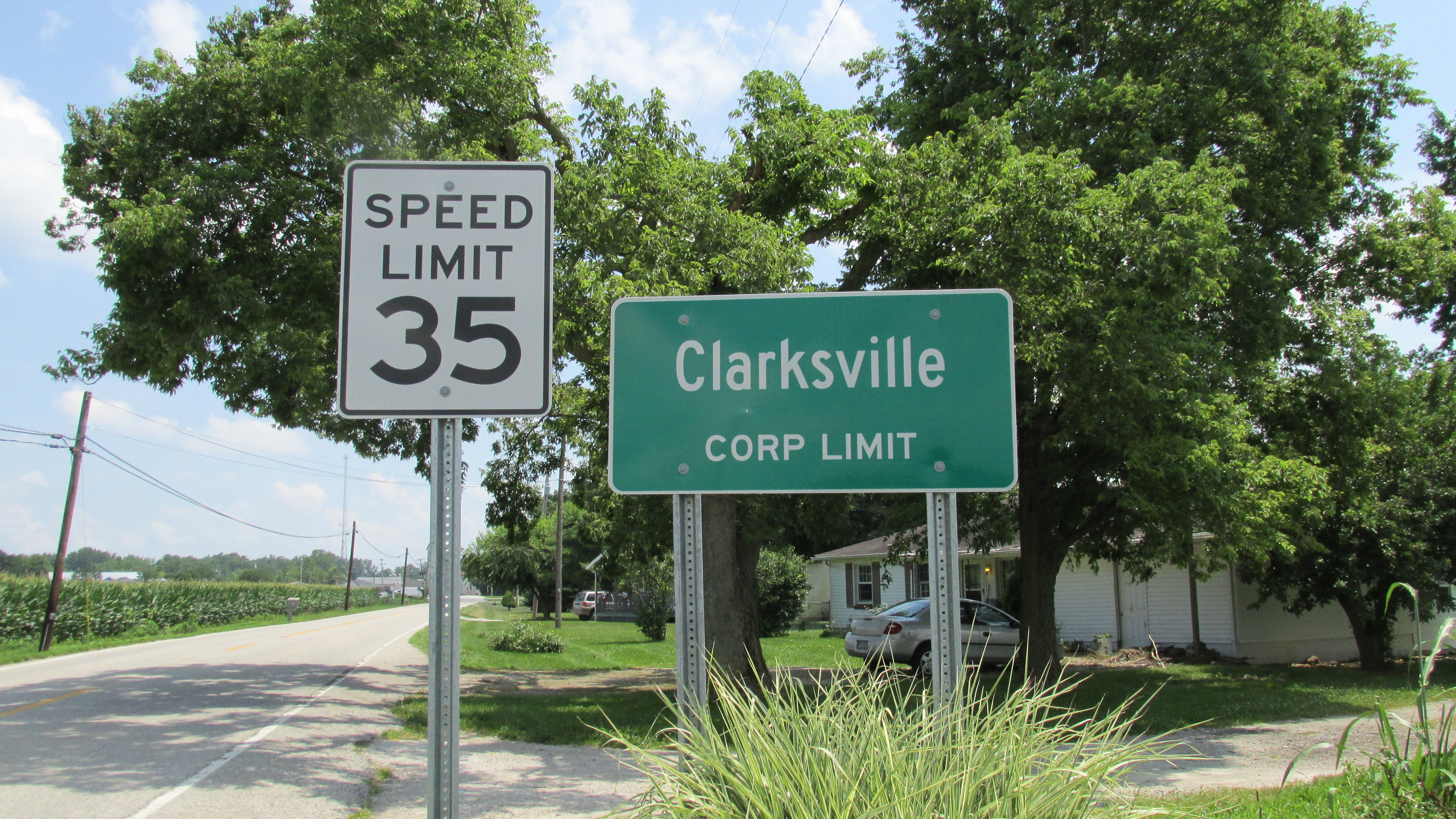
Clarksville corporation limit sign

== Notable people ==
- Chuck Cleaver, musician
- Cliff Rosenberger, Ohio Speaker of the House
- Biff Wysong, baseball player
