= National Register of Historic Places listings in Clinton County, Ohio =

Location of Clinton County in Ohio

This is a list of the National Register of Historic Places listings in Clinton County, Ohio.

This is intended to be a complete list of the properties and districts on the National Register of Historic Places in Clinton County, Ohio, United States. The locations of National Register properties and districts for which the latitude and longitude coordinates are included below, may be seen in a Google map.

There are 18 properties and districts listed on the National Register in the county. Another property was once listed but has been removed.

This National Park Service list is complete through NPS recent listings posted March 14, 2025.

== Current listings ==
| | Name on the Register | Image | Date listed | Location | City or town | Description |
|---|---|---|---|---|---|---|
| 1 | Beam Farm Woodland Archeological District | Beam Farm Woodland Archeological District | March 22, 2006 (#05000340) | 3983 Stone Rd., southwest of Sabina; 39°29′56″N 83°42′32″W | Wilson Township | |
| 2 | College Hall, Wilmington College | College Hall, Wilmington College | April 23, 1973 (#73001399) | East of College St. between Douglas St. and Fife Ave. on the Wilmington College campus 39°26′41″N 83°49′06″W | Wilmington | |
| 3 | Cowan Creek Circular Enclosure | Cowan Creek Circular Enclosure | July 15, 1974 (#74001422) | Southwest of Wilmington; 39°23′24″N 83°54′37″W | Vernon Township | |
| 4 | Doan House | Doan House | June 20, 1979 (#79001792) | 822 Fife Ave. 39°26′41″N 83°48′53″W | Wilmington | |
| 5 | Frank Haines House | Frank Haines House | April 1, 1982 (#82003556) | 149 W. Elm St. 39°29′23″N 83°38′20″W | Sabina | |
| 6 | Eli Harvey House | Eli Harvey House | February 14, 1978 (#78002024) | 1133 Lebanon Rd., north of Clarksville; 39°26′36″N 83°57′37″W | Adams Township | |
| 7 | Hillside Haven Mound | Hillside Haven Mound | November 21, 1978 (#78002026) | Thousand Trails Campground, 1786 State Route 380; 39°27′30″N 83°56′14″W | Adams Township | |
| 8 | Hurley Mound | Hurley Mound | May 5, 1978 (#78002025) | East of McKay Rd. above the Anderson Fork, southwest of Lumberton; 39°33′04″N 83°51′49″W | Liberty Township | |
| 9 | Keiter Mound | | October 21, 1975 (#75001346) | In woods west of McKay Rd., atop a bluff overlooking the Anderson Fork; 39°32′52″N 83°52′46″W | Liberty Township | |
| 10 | Lynchburg Covered Bridge | Lynchburg Covered Bridge | March 16, 1976 (#76001456) | East Fork of Little Miami River; 39°14′42″N 83°47′40″W | Lynchburg | Extends into Highland County |
| 11 | Main Building School | | November 21, 1980 (#80002960) | Sugartree St. 39°26′36″N 83°50′04″W | Wilmington | Demolished |
| 12 | Martinsville Road Covered Bridge | Martinsville Road Covered Bridge | September 10, 1974 (#74001421) | West of Martinsville; 39°19′47″N 83°50′06″W | Clark Township | |
| 13 | Pansy Methodist Church and School Historic District | Pansy Methodist Church and School Historic District | March 20, 1973 (#73001398) | South of Clarksville on State Route 730; 39°20′55″N 83°56′41″W | Vernon Township | |
| 14 | Rombach Place | Rombach Place | June 20, 1979 (#79001793) | 149 E. Locust St. 39°26′48″N 83°49′33″W | Wilmington | |
| 15 | Silk City Diner #4655 | Silk City Diner #4655 | August 10, 2005 (#05000848) | 303 Washington St. 39°29′16″N 83°38′31″W | Sabina | |
| 16 | South South Street Historic District | South South Street Historic District | May 6, 1993 (#93000396) | 151-515 S. South St. 39°26′32″N 83°49′45″W | Wilmington | |
| 17 | Underwood Farms Rural Historic District | Underwood Farms Rural Historic District | January 11, 2006 (#05001519) | Vicinity of State Route 73 and Brimstone Rd. 39°29′47″N 83°58′50″W | Chester Township | |
| 18 | Wilmington Commercial Historic District | Wilmington Commercial Historic District | October 14, 1982 (#82001363) | Roughly bounded by Columbus, Walnut, Sugartree, and Mulberry Sts. 39°26′44″N 83°49′44″W | Wilmington | |

== Former listing ==
| | Name on the Register | Image | Date listed | Date removed | Location | City or town | Description |
|---|---|---|---|---|---|---|---|
| 1 | Smith Place School | Smith Place School | November 25, 1980 (#80002961) | October 29, 1985 | N. South St. | Wilmington | |

== See also ==
- List of National Historic Landmarks in Ohio
- Listings in neighboring counties: Brown, Clermont, Fayette, Greene, Highland, Warren
- National Register of Historic Places listings in Ohio
