= Richland Township, Clinton County, Ohio =

Township in Ohio, US

- Township
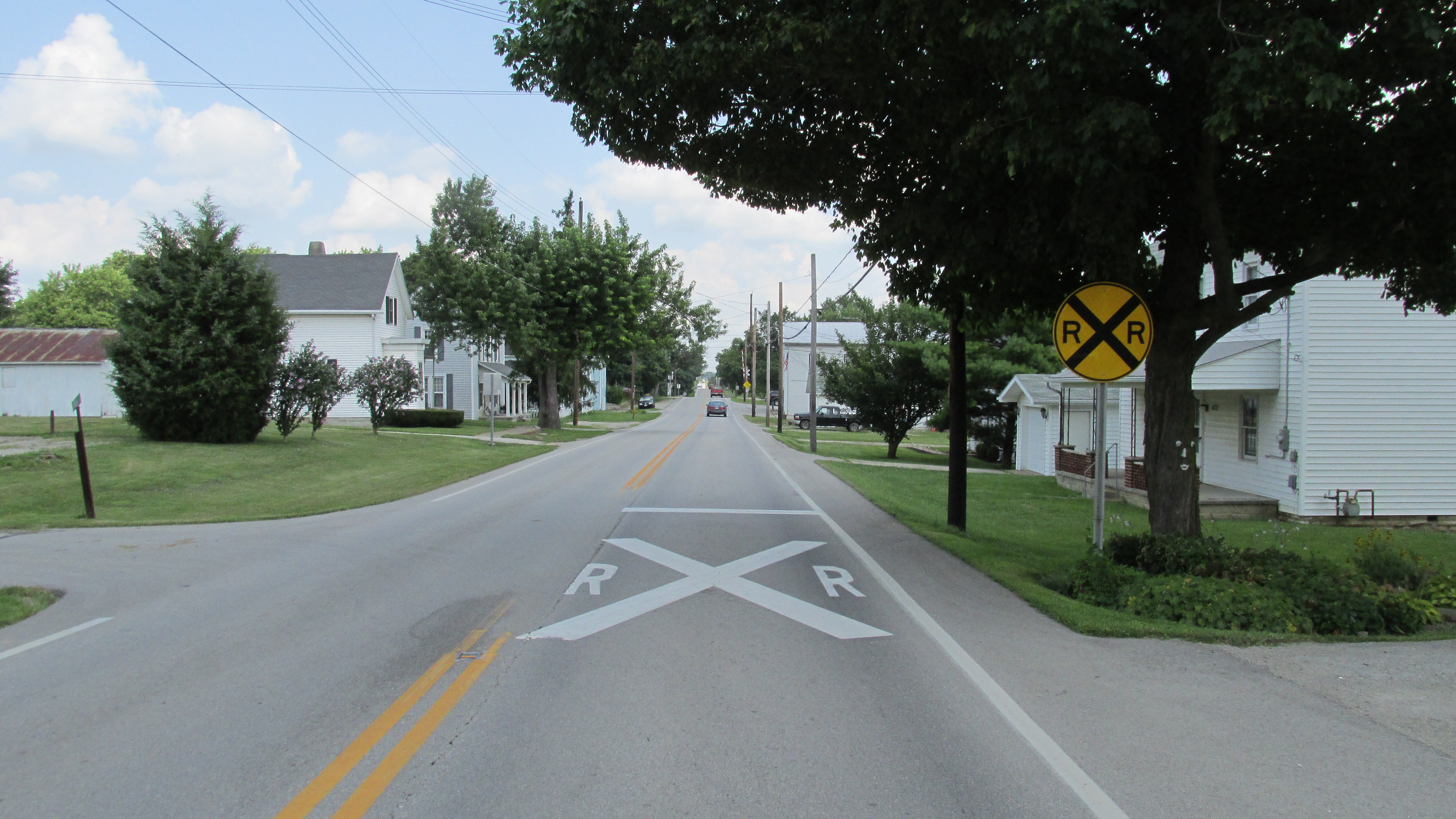
- Community scene in Reesville

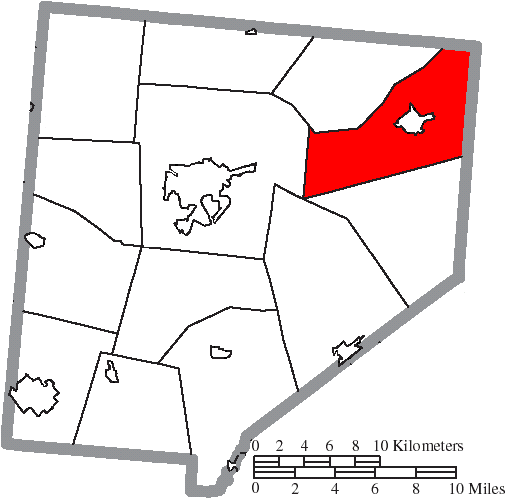
- Location of Richland Township in Clinton County
- Coordinates: 39°29′19″N 83°38′33″W
- Country: United States
- State: Ohio
- County: Clinton

Area
  - Total: 33.8 sq mi (87.6 km^{2})
  - Land: 33.6 sq mi (87.1 km^{2})
  - Water: 0.19 sq mi (0.5 km^{2})
- Elevation: 1,047 ft (319 m)

Population (2020)
  - Total: 3,526
  - Density: 105/sq mi (40.5/km^{2})
- Time zone: UTC-5 (Eastern (EST))
  - Summer (DST): UTC-4 (EDT)
- FIPS code: 39-66642
- GNIS feature ID: 1085883

Richland Township is one of the thirteen townships of Clinton County, Ohio, United States. The 2020 census reported 3,526 people living in the township.

Historical population
Census	Pop.	Note	%±
1990	3,671		—
2000	3,758		2.4%
2010	3,573		−4.9%

== Geography ==
Located in the northeast corner of the county, it borders the following townships:

- Jasper Township, Fayette County - northeast
- Concord Township, Fayette County - southeast
- Wayne Township - south
- Green Township - southwest
- Union Township - west
- Wilson Township - northwest

It is located in the northeast corner of the county. The entire township lies in the Virginia Military District and contains 21,210.72 acres (86 km^{2}) of land.

The village of Sabina is located in eastern Richland Township, and the unincorporated communities of Reesville and Melvin are in the western part of the township.

== Transportation ==
Major roads include the 3C Highway (aka State Route 3 and U.S. Route 22) and State Routes 729 and 72.

== Name ==
It is one of twelve Richland Townships statewide.

== History ==
Richland was one of the original three townships of Clinton County. It was erected by the County Commissioners on April 6, 1810 with the boundaries:

all that part of Clinton County east of the old boundary line of Warren County shall be one township known by the name of Richland.

On August 10, 1813, the Commissioners defined the boundaries more precisely:

Beginning at a large hickory at the corner of Green Township in the line of Union Township, thence running with the line of Green Township to the southerly corner of the county and at the corner of Fayette County, thence north with the county line to the northeast corner, then west with the county line to the original line of Warren County, then south with the said original line to the line of Union Township, then with the line of Union Township to the place of beginning.

The townships of Wilson, Wayne, and Green were created entirely from Richland Township. Parts of Union and Green were taken from it on August 21, 1813. On July 15, 1817, part was taken to create Liberty Township. In March 1837, Wayne Township was erected from it and Wilson in August 1850.

== Government ==
The township is governed by a three-member board of trustees, who are elected in November of odd-numbered years to a four-year term beginning on the following January 1. Two are elected in the year after the presidential election and one is elected in the year before it. There is also an elected township fiscal officer, who serves a four-year term beginning on April 1 of the year after the election, which is held in November of the year before the presidential election. Vacancies in the fiscal officership or on the board of trustees are filled by the remaining trustees.
