= Green Township, Clinton County, Ohio =

Township in Ohio, US

- Township
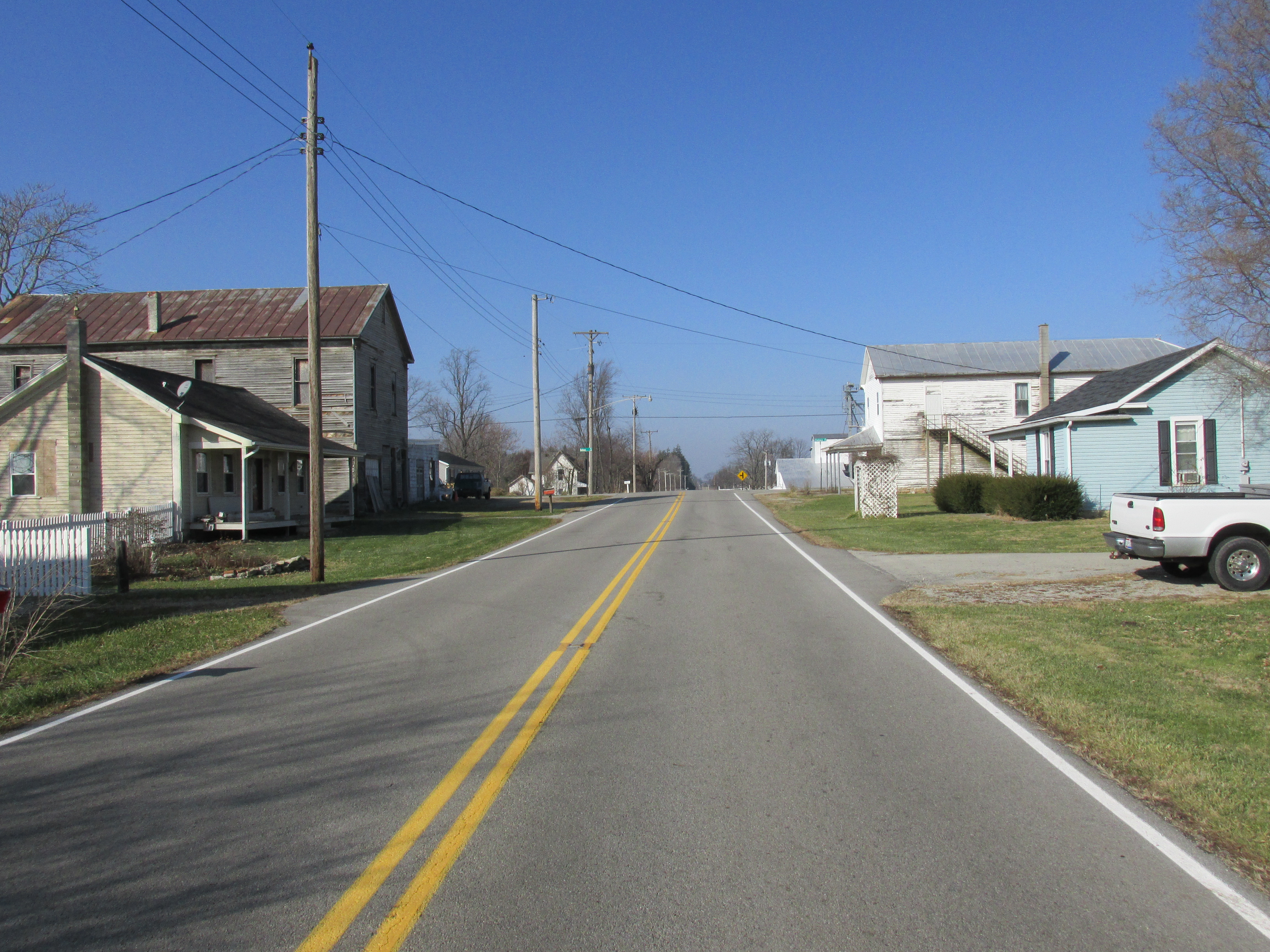
- Street scene in New Antioch

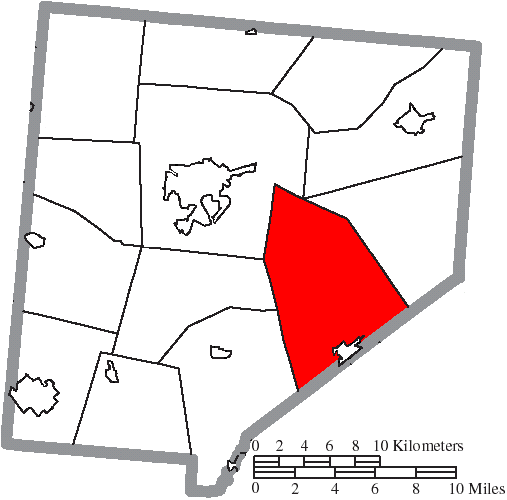
- Location of Green Township in Clinton County
- Coordinates: 39°21′10″N 83°42′15″W
- Country: United States
- State: Ohio
- County: Clinton

Area
  - Total: 42.2 sq mi (109.3 km^{2})
  - Land: 42.1 sq mi (109.0 km^{2})
  - Water: 0.15 sq mi (0.4 km^{2})
- Elevation: 1,180 ft (360 m)

Population (2020)
  - Total: 2,468
  - Density: 58.64/sq mi (22.64/km^{2})
- Time zone: UTC-5 (Eastern (EST))
  - Summer (DST): UTC-4 (EDT)
- FIPS code: 39-31710
- GNIS feature ID: 1085879

Green Township is one of the thirteen townships of Clinton County, Ohio, United States. The 2020 census reported 2,468 people living in the township.

== Geography ==
Located in the southeastern part of the county, it borders the following townships:

- Richland Township - north corner
- Wayne Township - northeast
- Fairfield Township, Highland County - southeast, north of Penn Township
- Penn Township, Highland County - southeast, south of Fairfield Township
- Union Township, Highland County - south
- Clark Township - southwest
- Washington Township - west
- Union Township - northwest

The entire township lies in the Virginia Military District.

The village of New Vienna is located in the southeastern part of Green Township, along the Highland County line.

Green Township contains the unincorporated community of New Antioch.

== Name and history ==
It is one of sixteen Green Townships statewide.

Formerly part of Highland County, the land was transferred by the Ohio General Assembly so that Clinton County would have the constitutionally mandated 400 square miles (1,000 km^{2}) of territory. The township was created by the Clinton County Commissioners on August 21, 1813.

== Government ==
The township is governed by a three-member board of trustees, who are elected in November of odd-numbered years to a four-year term beginning on the following January 1. Two are elected in the year after the presidential election and one is elected in the year before it. There is also an elected township fiscal officer, who serves a four-year term beginning on April 1 of the year after the election, which is held in November of the year before the presidential election. The trustees and clerk are chosen in non-partisan elections. Vacancies in the fiscal officership or on the board of trustees are filled by the remaining trustees.
