= Anderson Creek =

Anderson Creek may refer to one of the following places in the United States:

- Anderson Creek Township, Harnett County, North Carolina
  - Anderson Creek, North Carolina, an unincorporated community in the above township
- Anderson Creek (Pennsylvania), a tributary of the West Branch Susquehanna River

== See also ==
- Anderson Fork, a stream in Ohio, United States
- Anderson River (disambiguation)
