= Anderson River =

Anderson River may refer to:

- Anderson River (British Columbia), a tributary of the Fraser River in Canada
- Anderson River (Northwest Territories), a tributary of the Beaufort Sea in Canada
- Anderson River (Indiana), a tributary of the Ohio River in the US

== See also ==
- Anderson Creek (disambiguation)
- Anderson Fork, a creek in Ohio
