= Wilson Township, Clinton County, Ohio =

Township in Ohio, US

- Township
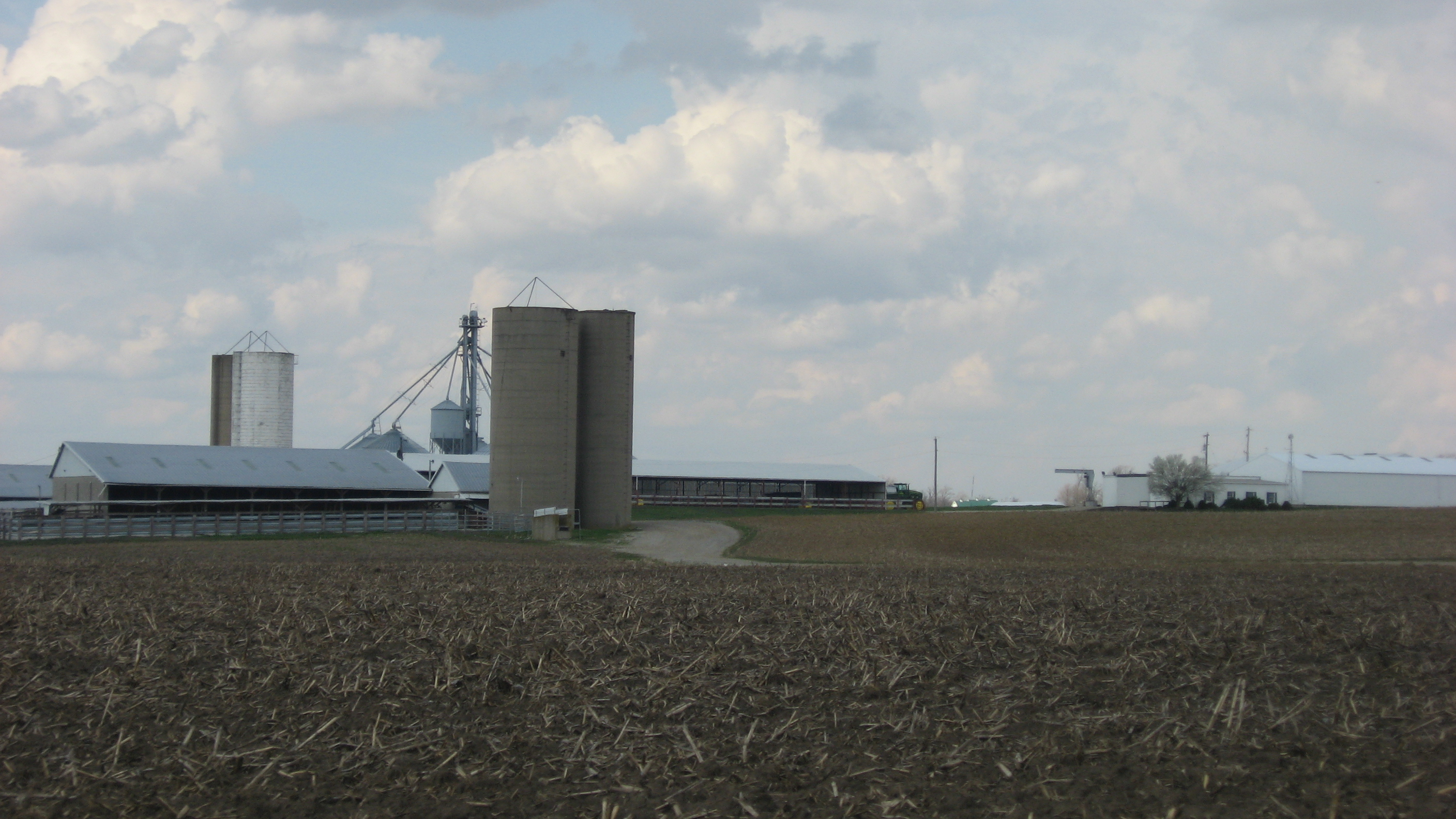
- Overview of the Beam Farm Woodland Archaeological District

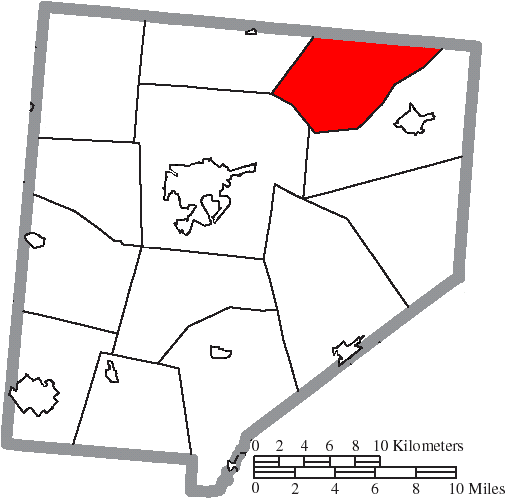
- Location of Wilson Township in Clinton County
- Coordinates: 39°31′52″N 83°41′34″W
- Country: United States
- State: Ohio
- County: Clinton

Area
  - Total: 24.7 sq mi (64.1 km^{2})
  - Land: 24.7 sq mi (63.9 km^{2})
  - Water: 0.077 sq mi (0.2 km^{2})
- Elevation: 1,112 ft (339 m)

Population (2020)
  - Total: 505
  - Density: 20.5/sq mi (7.90/km^{2})
- Time zone: UTC-5 (Eastern (EST))
  - Summer (DST): UTC-4 (EDT)
- FIPS code: 39-85820
- GNIS feature ID: 1085888

Wilson Township is one of the thirteen townships of Clinton County, Ohio, United States. It is the least populous township in Clinton County, with 505 inhabitants as of the 2020 census.

== Geography ==
Located in the northeastern part of the county, it borders the following townships:

- Jasper Township, Fayette County - northeast
- Richland Township - southeast
- Union Township - southwest
- Liberty Township - west
- Jefferson Township, Greene County - northwest

The entire township lies in the Virginia Military District.

No municipalities are located in Wilson Township, but it does contain the unincorporated community of Bloomington.

== Name and history ==
The only Wilson Township statewide, it is named for Amos Wilson, one of the earliest settlers of the county, who arrived in approximately 1796.

The township was erected in 1850 by the Clinton County Commissioners from parts of Union, Richland, and Liberty townships.

== Government ==
The township is governed by a three-member board of trustees, who are elected in November of odd-numbered years to a four-year term beginning on the following January 1. Two are elected in the year after the presidential election and one is elected in the year before it. There is also an elected township fiscal officer, who serves a four-year term beginning on April 1 of the year after the election, which is held in November of the year before the presidential election. Vacancies in the fiscal officership or on the board of trustees are filled by the remaining trustees.

== Education ==
Wilson township is covered by Greeneview Local School, East Clinton Local School, Wilmington City School
