= Union Township, Clinton County, Ohio =

Township in Ohio, US

- Township
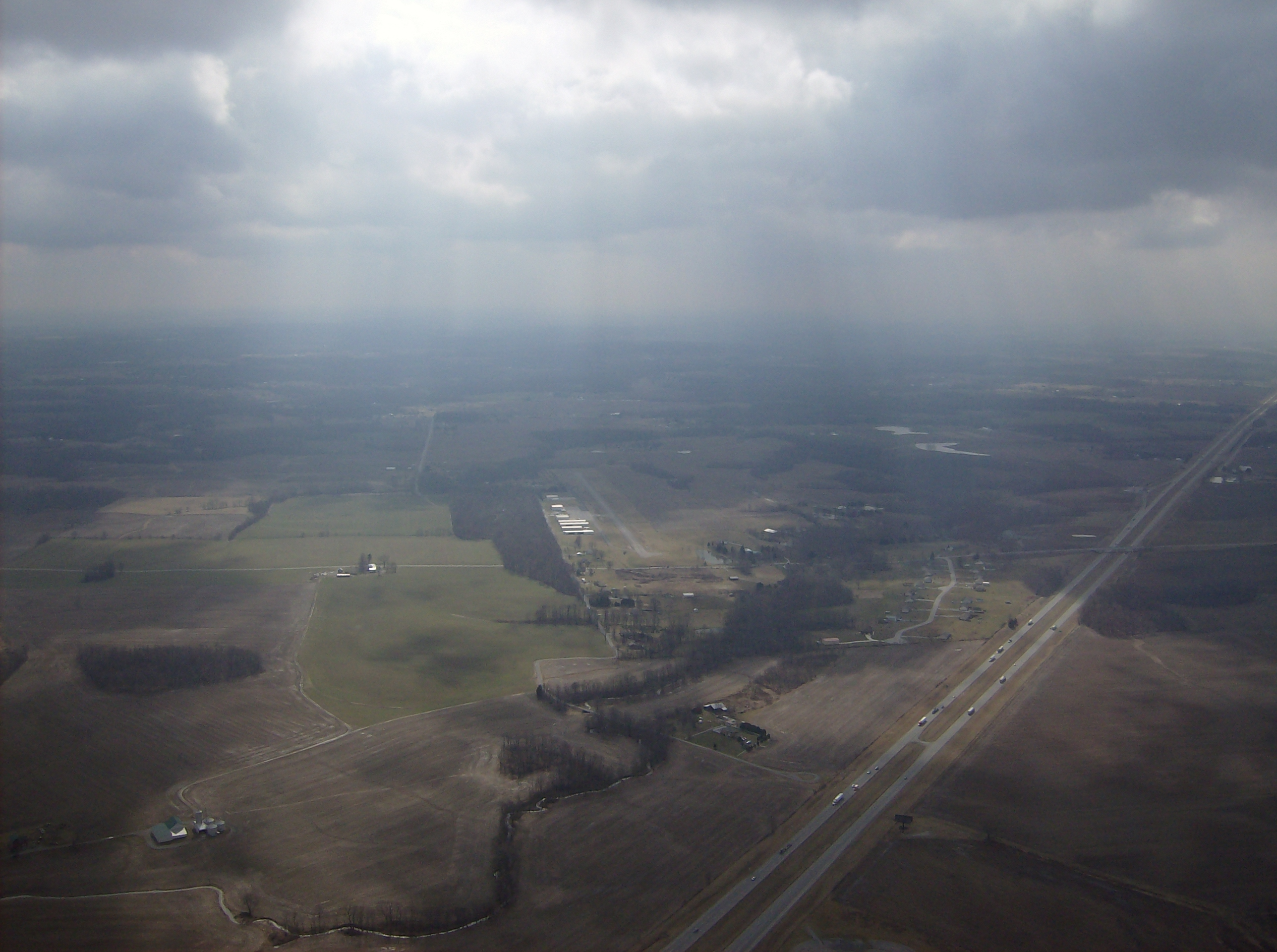
- Clinton Field, an airport in northwestern Union Township

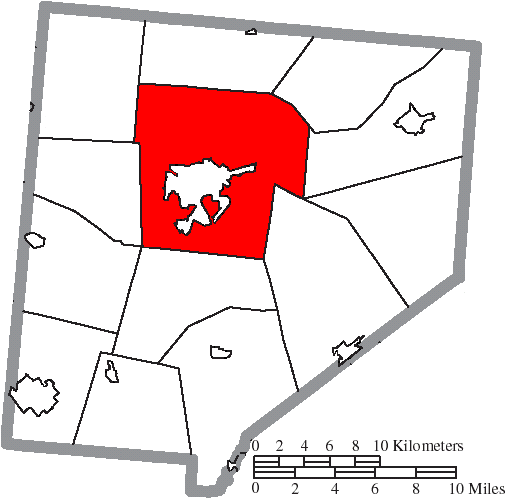
- Location of Union Township in Clinton County
- Coordinates: 39°27′0″N 83°49′38″W
- Country: United States
- State: Ohio
- County: Clinton

Area
  - Total: 49.5 sq mi (128.3 km^{2})
  - Land: 49.2 sq mi (127.3 km^{2})
  - Water: 0.42 sq mi (1.1 km^{2})
- Elevation: 1,024 ft (312 m)

Population (2020)
  - Total: 3,140
  - Density: 63.9/sq mi (24.7/km^{2})
- Time zone: UTC-5 (Eastern (EST))
  - Summer (DST): UTC-4 (EDT)
- FIPS code: 39-78302
- GNIS feature ID: 1085884

Union Township is one of the thirteen townships of Clinton County, Ohio, United States. The 2020 United States Census reported 3,140 people living in the township.

== Geography ==
Located at the center of the county, it borders the following townships:

- Liberty Township - north
- Wilson Township - northeast
- Richland Township - east
- Wayne Township - southeast corner
- Green Township - southeast
- Washington Township - south
- Vernon Township - southwest corner
- Adams Township - west
- Chester Township - northwest

The entire township lies in the Virginia Military District.

The city of Wilmington, the county seat of Clinton County, is located in central Union Township.

== Name and history ==
Union Township was established in 1813. It was so named because it was formed from a "union" of land given by Chester, Richland, and Vernon townships.

It is one of twenty-seven Union Townships statewide.

== Transportation ==
Major roads include the 3C Highway (State Route 3 and U.S. Route 22), U.S. Route 68, and State Routes 73 and 134.

Clinton County Air Force Base, a former Air Force Reserve base for a KC-97 refueling unit, an active duty F-101 fighter-interceptor and an active duty U.S. Army Nike missile battalion, was turned into the Wilmington Airport, a hub for Airborne Express, now DHL. It is now known as Airborne Airpark and is located just east of Wilmington in the township.

== Government ==
The township is governed by a three-member board of trustees, who are elected in November of odd-numbered years to a four-year term beginning on the following January 1. Two are elected in the year after the presidential election and one is elected in the year before it. There is also an elected township fiscal officer, who serves a four-year term beginning on April 1 of the year after the election, which is held in November of the year before the presidential election. Vacancies in the fiscal officership or on the board of trustees are filled by the remaining trustees.
