= Wayne Township, Clinton County, Ohio =

Township in Ohio, US

- Township
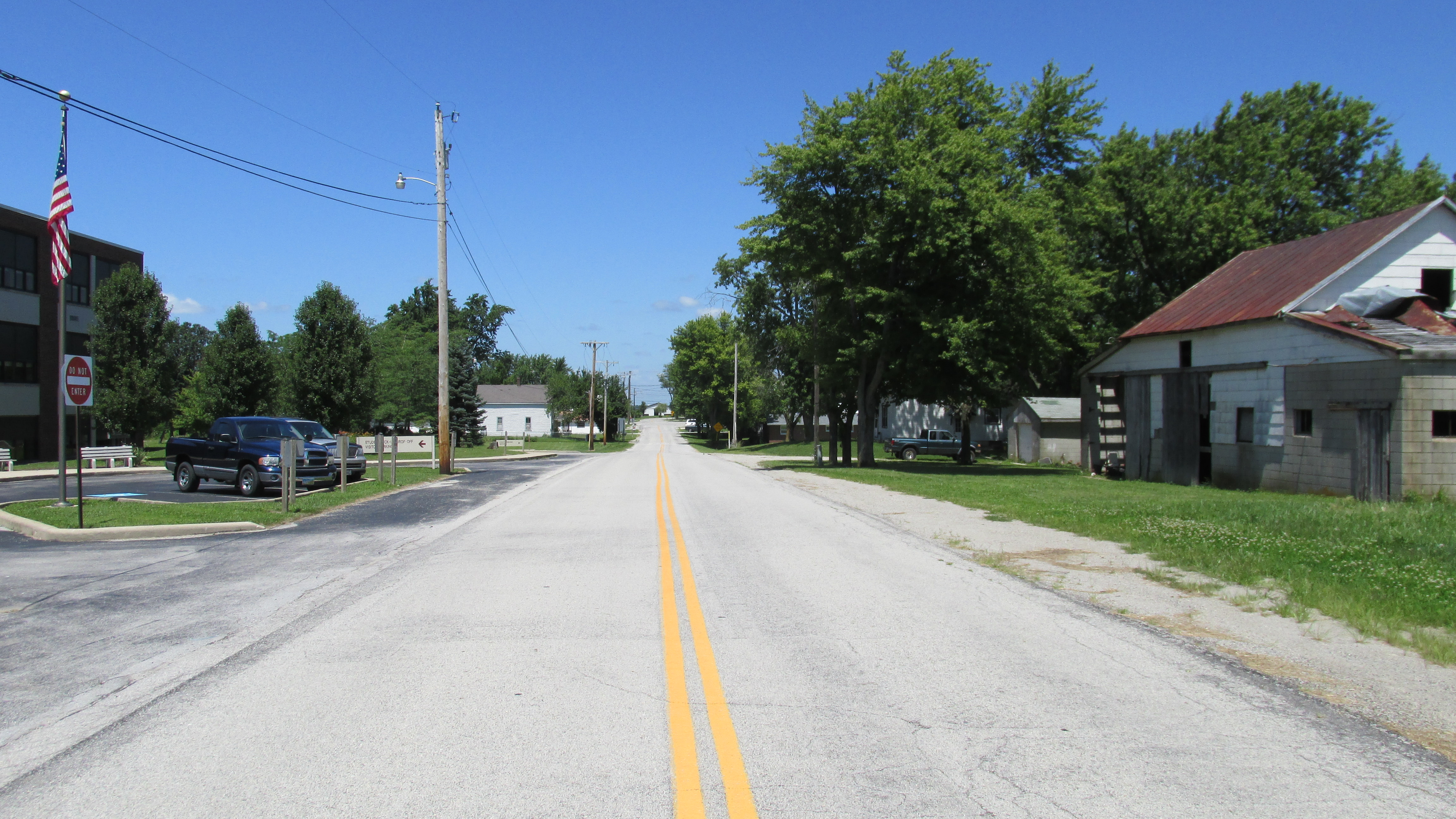
- Lees Creek

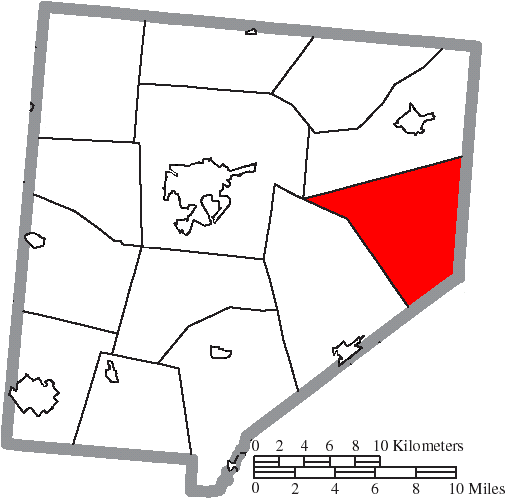
- Location of Wayne Township in Clinton County
- Coordinates: 39°25′0″N 83°38′2″W
- Country: United States
- State: Ohio
- County: Clinton

Area
  - Total: 31.6 sq mi (81.8 km^{2})
  - Land: 31.5 sq mi (81.7 km^{2})
  - Water: 0.039 sq mi (0.1 km^{2})
- Elevation: 1,086 ft (331 m)

Population (2020)
  - Total: 700
  - Density: 22/sq mi (8.6/km^{2})
- Time zone: UTC-5 (Eastern (EST))
  - Summer (DST): UTC-4 (EDT)
- FIPS code: 39-82124
- GNIS feature ID: 1085887

Wayne Township is one of the thirteen townships of Clinton County, Ohio, United States. As of the 2020 census the population was 700.

== Geography ==
Located in the eastern part of the county, it borders the following townships:

- Richland Township – north
- Concord Township, Fayette County – northeast
- Green Township, Fayette County – east
- Fairfield Township, Highland County – southeast
- Green Township – southwest
- Union Township – west corner

The entire township lies in the Virginia Military District and has an area of 20,200 acres (81.8 km^{2}).

No municipalities are located in Wayne Township, although the unincorporated community of Lees Creek lies in the township's center.

Historical population
Census	Pop.	Note	%±
1990	617		—
2000	737		19.4%
2010	716		−2.8%
2020	700		−2.2%

== Name and history ==
Named in honor of General "Mad Anthony" Wayne, it is one of twenty Wayne Townships statewide.

Wayne Township was erected in 1837 by the Clinton County Commissioners from parts of Green and Richland townships.

== Transportation ==
Major roads in Wayne Township are State Routes 72 and 729.

== Government ==
The township is governed by a three-member board of trustees, who are elected in November of odd-numbered years to a four-year term beginning on the following January 1. Two are elected in the year after the presidential election and one is elected in the year before it. There is also an elected township fiscal officer, who serves a four-year term beginning on April 1 of the year after the election, which is held in November of the year before the presidential election. Vacancies in the fiscal officership or on the board of trustees are filled by the remaining trustees.
