= Concord Township, Fayette County, Ohio =

Township in Ohio, US

- Township
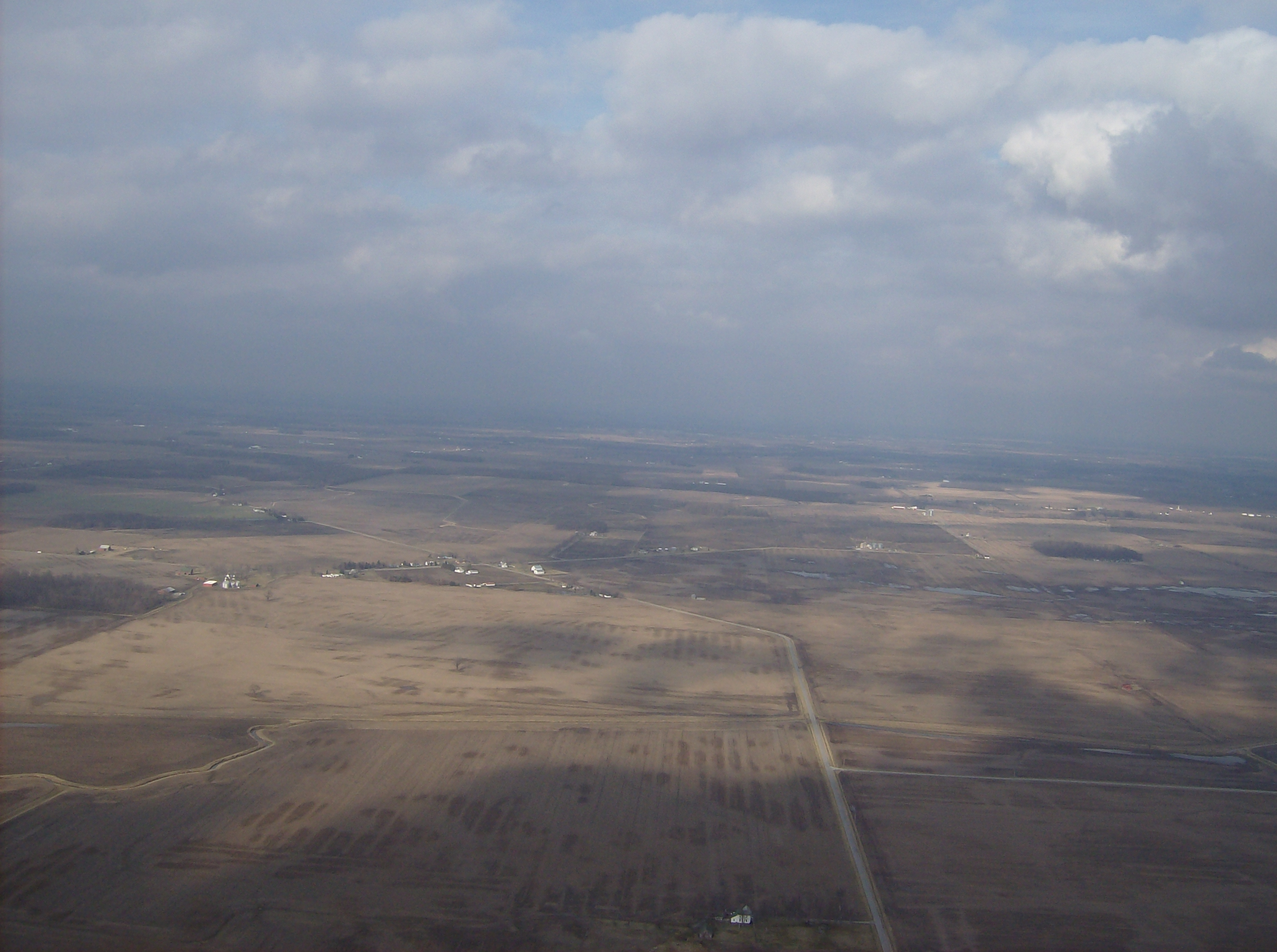
- Countryside in Concord Township

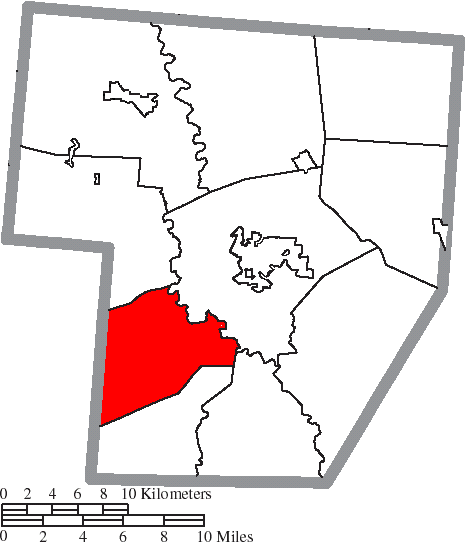
- Location of Concord Township in Fayette County
- Coordinates: 39°28′33″N 83°31′17″W
- Country: United States
- State: Ohio
- County: Fayette

Area
  - Total: 28.73 sq mi (74.40 km^{2})
  - Land: 28.71 sq mi (74.35 km^{2})
  - Water: 0.023 sq mi (0.06 km^{2})
- Elevation: 1,020 ft (310 m)

Population (2020)
  - Total: 961
  - Density: 33.5/sq mi (12.9/km^{2})
- Time zone: UTC-5 (Eastern (EST))
  - Summer (DST): UTC-4 (EDT)
- FIPS code: 39-18154
- GNIS feature ID: 1086086

Concord Township is one of the ten townships of Fayette County, Ohio, United States. At the 2020 census the population was 961.

== Geography ==
Located in the southwestern part of the county, it borders the following townships:

- Jasper Township - north
- Union Township - northeast
- Perry Township - southeast
- Green Township - south
- Wayne Township, Clinton County - southwest
- Richland Township, Clinton County - northwest

No municipalities are located in Concord Township.

Historical population
Census	Pop.	Note	%±
1990	1,069		—
2000	1,068		−0.1%
2010	901		−15.6%
2020	961		6.7%

== Name and history ==
It is one of seven Concord Townships in Ohio.

== Government ==
The township is governed by a three-member board of trustees, who are elected in November of odd-numbered years to a four-year term beginning on the following January 1. Two are elected in the year after the presidential election and one is elected in the year before it. There is also an elected township fiscal officer, who serves a four-year term beginning on April 1 of the year after the election, which is held in November of the year before the presidential election. Vacancies in the fiscal officership or on the board of trustees are filled by the remaining trustees.
