= Caesarscreek Township, Ohio =

Township in Ohio, US

Caesarscreek Township, Greene County, Ohio
- Township
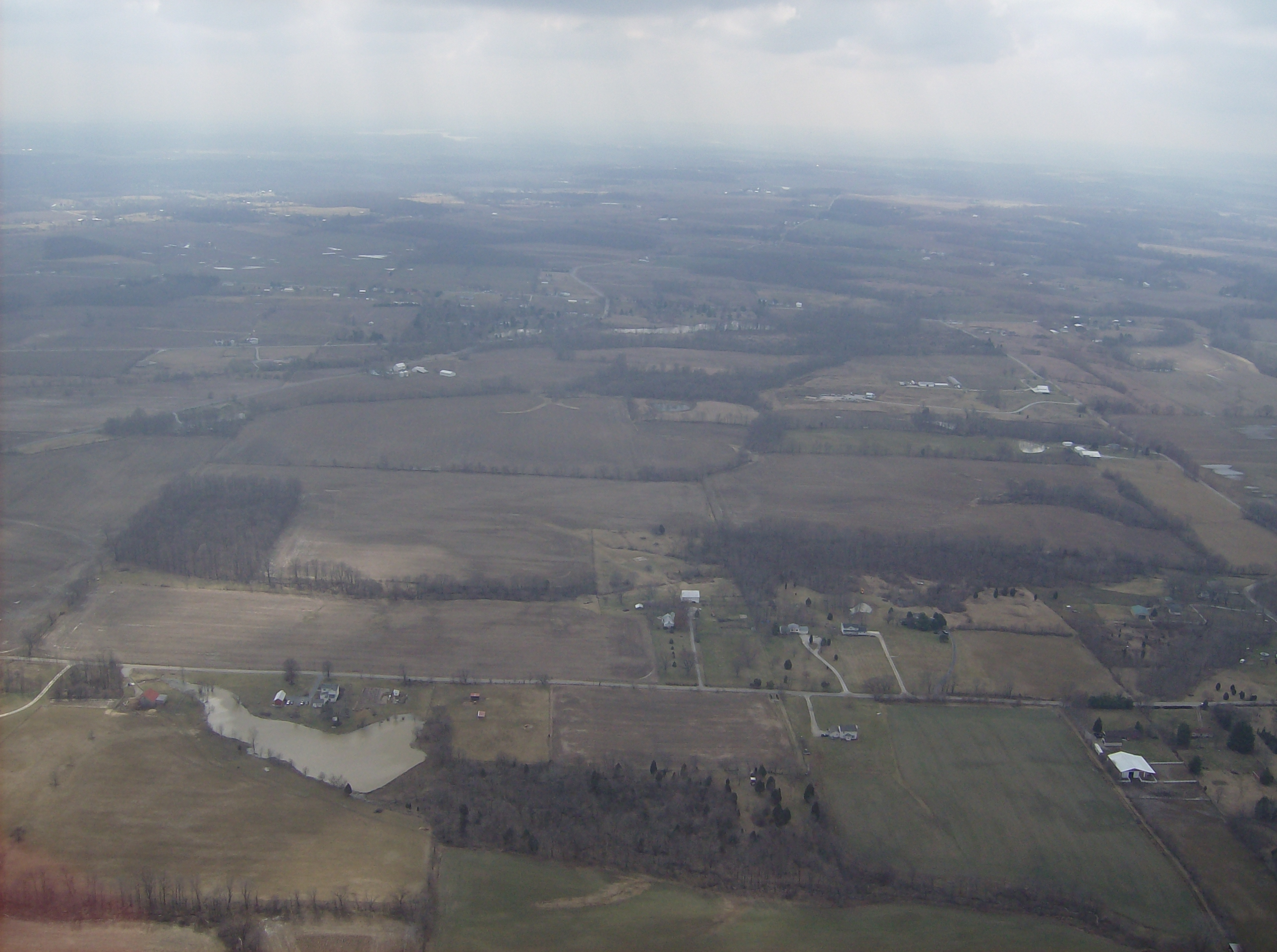
- Countryside in far northern Caesarscreek Township

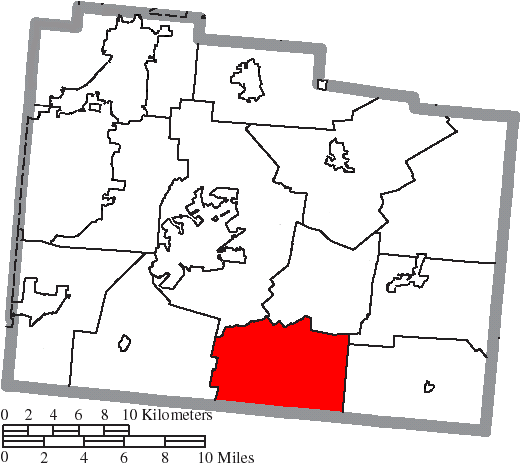
- Location of Caesarscreek Township in Greene County
- Coordinates: 39°35′11″N 83°51′6″W
- Country: United States
- State: Ohio
- County: Greene

Area
  - Total: 27.6 sq mi (71.4 km^{2})
  - Land: 27.4 sq mi (71.0 km^{2})
  - Water: 0.15 sq mi (0.4 km^{2})
- Elevation: 980 ft (300 m)

Population (2020)
  - Total: 1,185
  - Density: 43.2/sq mi (16.7/km^{2})
- Time zone: UTC-5 (Eastern (EST))
  - Summer (DST): UTC-4 (EDT)
- FIPS code: 39-10856
- GNIS feature ID: 1086165
- Website: https://caesarscreektwp.com/

Caesarscreek Township is one of the twelve townships of Greene County, Ohio, United States. As of the 2020 census the township population was 1,185.

== Geography ==
Located in the southern part of the county, it borders the following townships:

- New Jasper Township - north
- Silvercreek Township - northeast
- Jefferson Township - east
- Liberty Township, Clinton County - southeast
- Chester Township, Clinton County - southwest
- Spring Valley Township - west
- Xenia Township - northwest

No municipalities are located in Caesarscreek Township.

== Name and history ==
Caesarcreek Township was established in 1803.

It is the only Caesarscreek Township statewide.

== Government ==
The township is governed by a three-member board of trustees, who are elected in November of odd-numbered years to a four-year term beginning on the following January 1. Two are elected in the year after the presidential election and one is elected in the year before it. There is also an elected township fiscal officer, who serves a four-year term beginning on April 1 of the year after the election, which is held in November of the year before the presidential election. Vacancies in the fiscal officership or on the board of trustees are filled by the remaining trustees.
