= Beavercreek Township, Ohio =

Township in Ohio, US

- Township
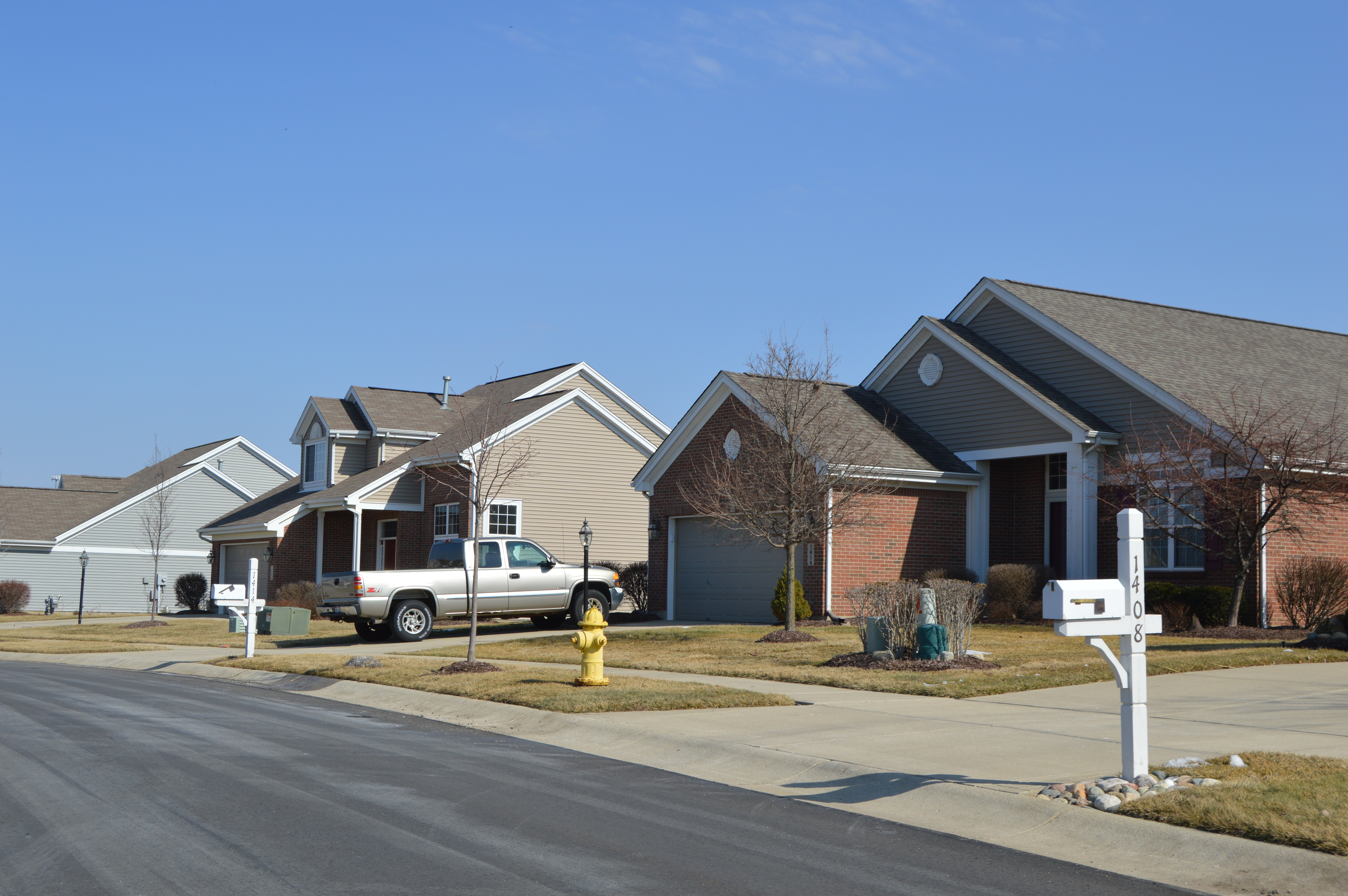
- Suburban development off Trebein Road

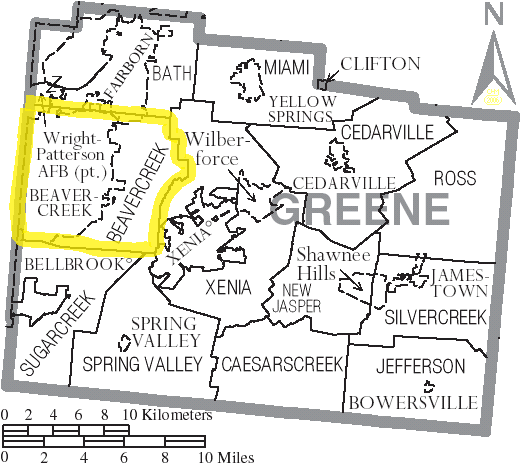
- Location of Beavercreek Township in Greene County
- Coordinates: 39°43′51″N 84°3′12″W
- Country: United States
- State: Ohio
- County: Greene

Area
  - Total: 49.2 sq mi (127.5 km^{2})
  - Land: 48.8 sq mi (126.3 km^{2})
  - Water: 0.46 sq mi (1.2 km^{2})
- Elevation: 850 ft (260 m)

Population (2020)
  - Total: 56,026
  - Density: 1,149/sq mi (443.6/km^{2})
- Time zone: UTC-5 (Eastern (EST))
  - Summer (DST): UTC-4 (EDT)
- ZIP code(s): 45305 45324 45385 45430 45431 45434 45440
- Area codes: 937, 326
- FIPS code: 39-04724
- GNIS feature ID: 1086164
- Website: https://www.beavercreektwpohio.gov/

Beavercreek Township is one of the twelve townships of Greene County, Ohio, United States. As of the 2020 census the township population was 56,026.

== Geography ==
Located in the western part of the county, it borders the following townships and cities:

- Bath Township - north
- Spring Valley Township - southeast
- Sugarcreek Township - south
- Xenia Township - east
- Kettering - southwest
- Riverside - northwest
- Xenia - southeast

Several populated places are located in Beavercreek Township:

- Most of the city of Beavercreek, in the west
- Part of the city of Fairborn, in the north
- Part of Wright-Patterson Air Force Base, a census-designated place, in the northwest
- Trebein, an unincorporated community, in the southeast
- Small unincorporated parts of New Germany, in the northwest

== Name and history ==
Beavercreek Township was established in 1803 at a meeting in a log house on Beaver Creek.

It is the only Beavercreek Township statewide.

== Government ==
The township is governed by a three-member board of trustees, who are elected in November of odd-numbered years to a four-year term beginning on the following January 1. Two are elected in the year after the presidential election and one is elected in the year before it. There is also an elected township fiscal officer, who serves a four-year term beginning on April 1 of the year after the election, which is held in November of the year before the presidential election. Vacancies in the fiscal office or on the board of trustees are filled by statutory process.

== Demographics ==
=== 2020 census ===
Beavercreek Township racial composition
| Race | Number | Percentage |
|---|---|---|
| White (NH) | 44,335 | 79.1% |
| Black or African American (NH) | 1,810 | 3.23% |
| Native American (NH) | 112 | 0.20% |
| Asian (NH) | 3,395 | 6.06% |
| Pacific Islander (NH) | 23 | 0.04% |
| Other/mixed | 4,317 | 7.71% |
| Hispanic or Latino | 2,033 | 3.63% |

== Education ==
Beavercreek Township is home to Ohio University Russ Research Center and Clark State's Greene Center and is in close proximity to Antioch College, Cedarville University, Central State University, University of Dayton, Wilberforce University, and Wright State University.

Beavercreek City School District consists of one middle school, part of the $84 million bond issue passed on November 4, 2008, to be used to build an elementary and middle school and renovate buildings district-wide.
