= Cowan Creek Circular Enclosure =

Earthworks complex in Ohio, United States

- U.S. National Register of Historic Places
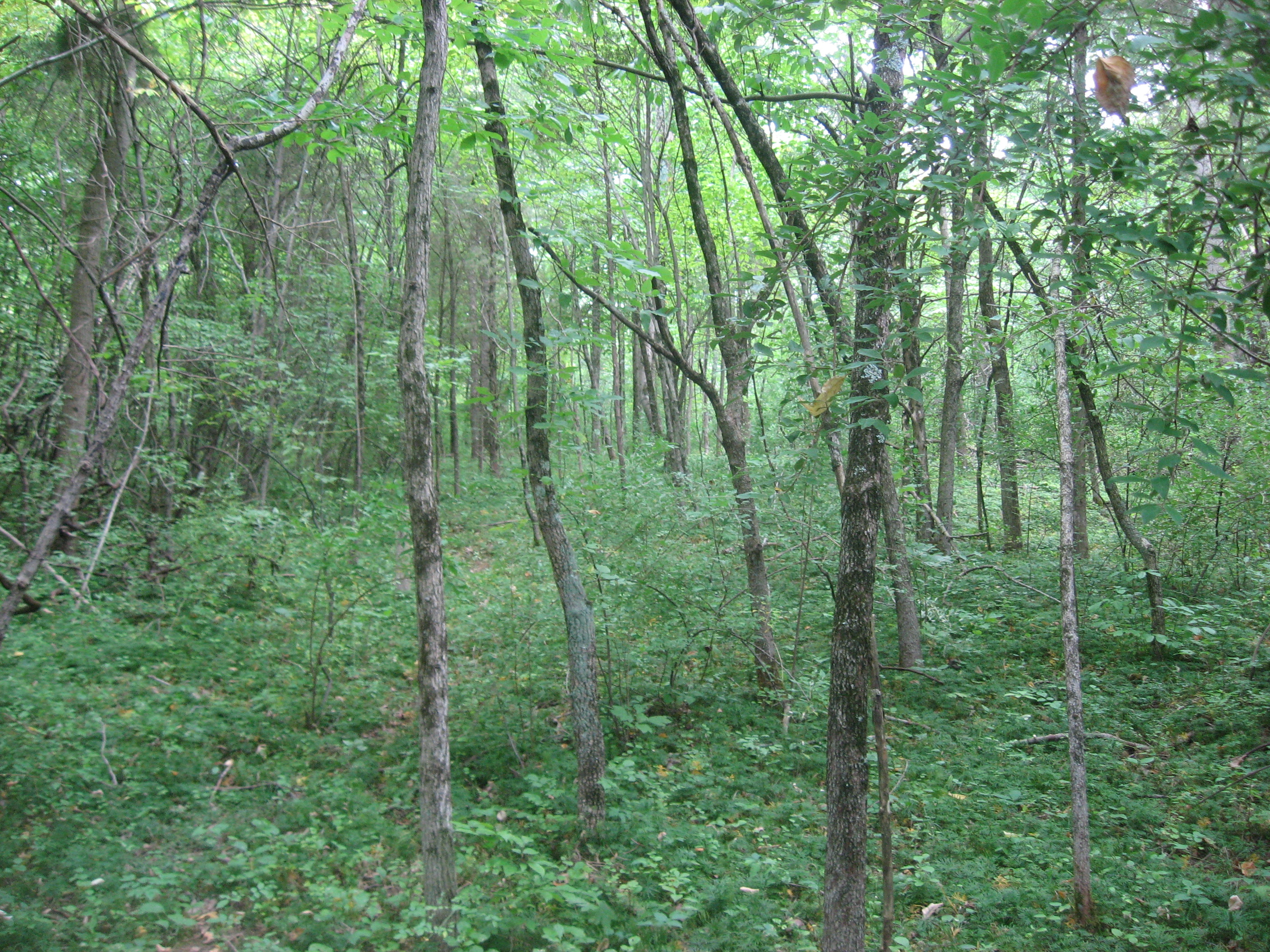
- Woodlands at the site

- Location within Ohio Location within the United States
- Location: Southwest of Wilmington
- Coordinates: 39°23′24″N 83°54′37″W
- Area: 3 acres (1.2 ha)
- NRHP reference No.: 74001422
- Added to NRHP: July 15, 1974

The Cowan Creek Circular Enclosure (33CN11) is an earthworks complex in the southwestern part of the U.S. state of Ohio. Named for its location near the stream known as Cowan Creek, the enclosure is an important archaeological site, and it is protected as part of a state park.

The Cowan Creek Circular Enclosure is not easily visible to the average observer on the ground. A survey conducted in 1949 observed that the enclosure was approximately 90 feet (27 m) wide, but even at that time, it had virtually no height; the only practical method of observing the site's extent was via aerial photography. Most of what is known of the site is derived from a related site not far away from the enclosure. The latter site, known as the "Cowan Creek Mound", was excavated in 1949; archaeological work revealed that the mound had been constructed circa AD 500, near the end of the period during which the Adena culture inhabited the region. This mound was part of a substantially larger group: more than twenty burial mounds were located along Cowan Creek near the enclosure, but little is known about most of them: by the time that Raymond Baby was leading the Cowan Creek Mound excavation, a dam on the creek had been completed, and the water levels of a reservoir covered the mounds before most could be investigated. The entire group remains beneath the surface of Cowan Lake to the present day, except for the enclosure.

Today, the Circular Enclosure lies near the shore of Cowan Lake; the underwater site of the Cowan Creek Mound is only about 300 feet (90 m) away, and the enclosure lies in the middle of a peninsula in the lake. The site is now located within Cowan Lake State Park, slightly less than 1 mile (1.6 km) south of the present State Route 730. Officials have sought to allow the site and surrounding lands to return to the condition in which they existed before the region was settled. As a result, the site has never been subjected to intensive professional testing; archaeologists accordingly are unaware of whether any additional sites, such as a village location, might be nearby. In 1974, the Cowan Creek Circular Enclosure was listed on the National Register of Historic Places because of its value as an archaeological site. Four other Clinton County archaeological sites are listed on the Register: the Beam Farm Woodland Archaeological District, and the Hillside Haven, Hurley, and Keiter Mounds.
