= Jefferson Township, Greene County, Ohio =

Township in Ohio, US

- Township
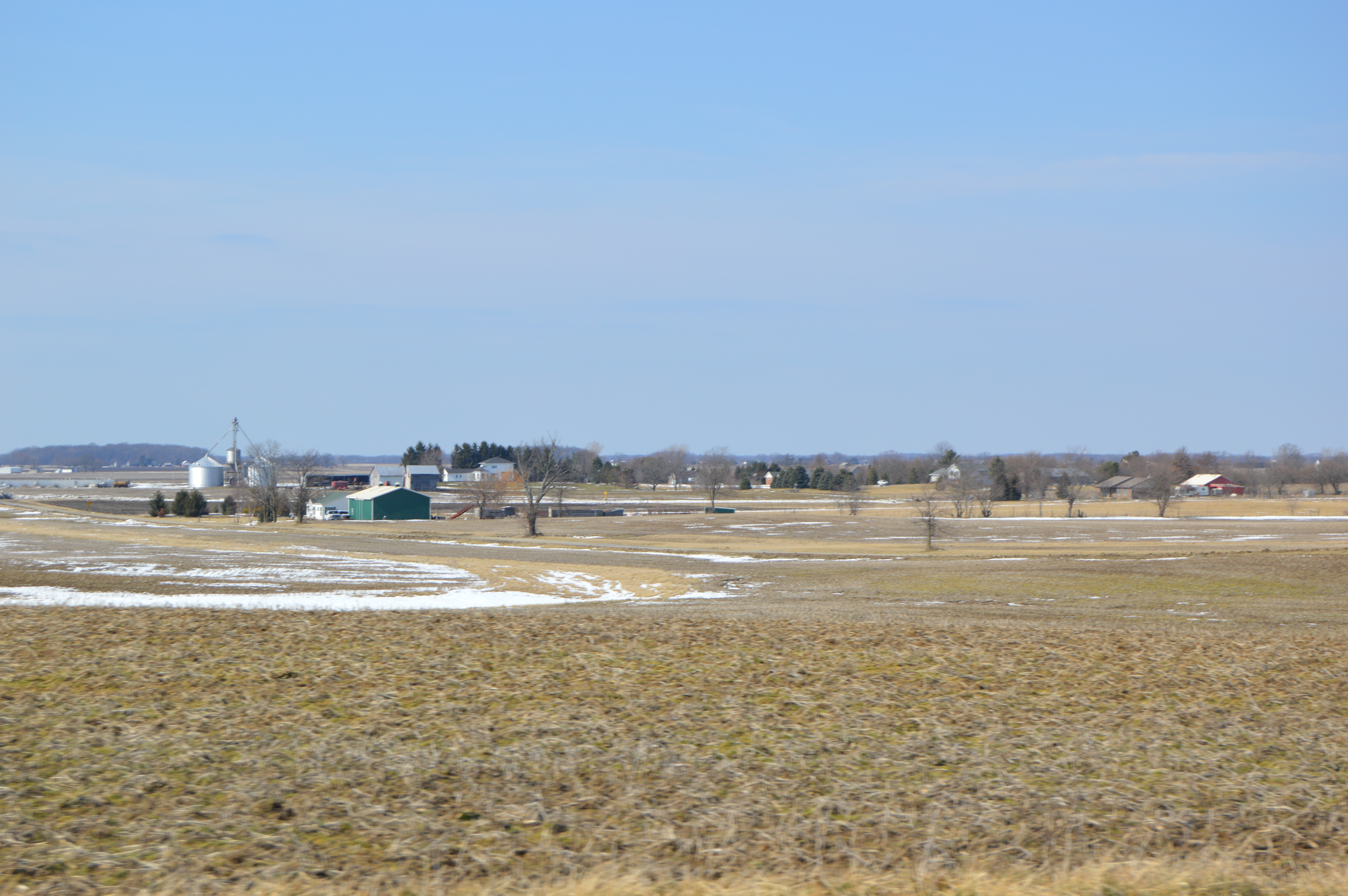
- North of Bowersville on State Route 72

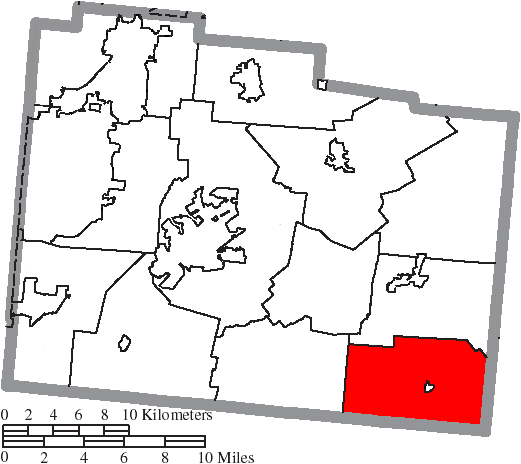
- Location of Jefferson Township in Greene County
- Coordinates: 39°35′12″N 83°43′56″W
- Country: United States
- State: Ohio
- County: Greene

Area
  - Total: 28.8 sq mi (74.7 km^{2})
  - Land: 28.8 sq mi (74.5 km^{2})
  - Water: 0.077 sq mi (0.2 km^{2})
- Elevation: 1,050 ft (320 m)

Population (2020)
  - Total: 1,119
  - Density: 38.9/sq mi (15.0/km^{2})
- Time zone: UTC-5 (Eastern (EST))
  - Summer (DST): UTC-4 (EDT)
- FIPS code: 39-38626
- GNIS feature ID: 1086168
- Website: https://www.jeffersontwpgreene.us/

Jefferson Township is one of the twelve townships of Greene County, Ohio, United States. As of the 2020 census the township population was 1,119.

== Geography ==
Located in the southeastern corner of the county, it borders the following townships:

- Silvercreek Township - north
- Jasper Township, Fayette County - east
- Wilson Township, Clinton County - southeast
- Liberty Township, Clinton County - southwest
- Caesarscreek Township - west

The village of Bowersville is located in central Jefferson Township.

== Name and history ==
Jefferson Township was organized in 1858. It is named for Thomas Jefferson, third President of the United States.

It is one of twenty-four Jefferson Townships statewide.

== Government ==
The township is governed by a three-member board of trustees, who are elected in November of odd-numbered years to a four-year term beginning on the following January 1. Two are elected in the year after the presidential election and one is elected in the year before it. There is also an elected township fiscal officer, who serves a four-year term beginning on April 1 of the year after the election, which is held in November of the year before the presidential election. Vacancies in the fiscal officership or on the board of trustees are filled by the remaining trustees.
