= New Antioch, Ohio =

Unincorporated community in Ohio, U.S.

Coordinates: 39°24′26″N 83°44′46″W

New Antioch is an unincorporated community in Green Township, Clinton County, Ohio, United States.

== History ==
New Antioch was platted in 1851. The community was named after the ancient city of Antioch. A post office called New Antioch was established in 1847, and remained in operation until 1907.

== Gallery ==
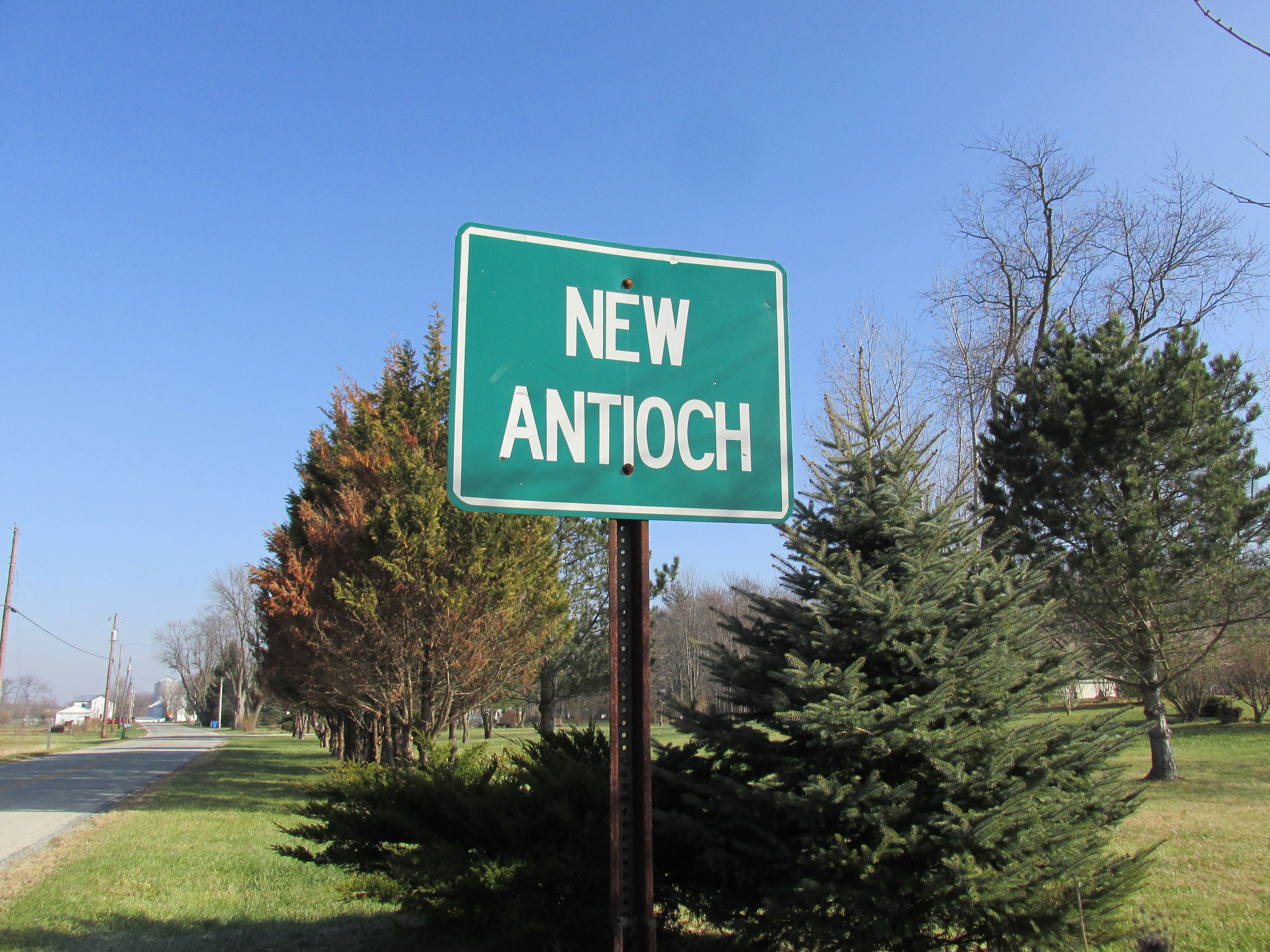
New Antioch community sign

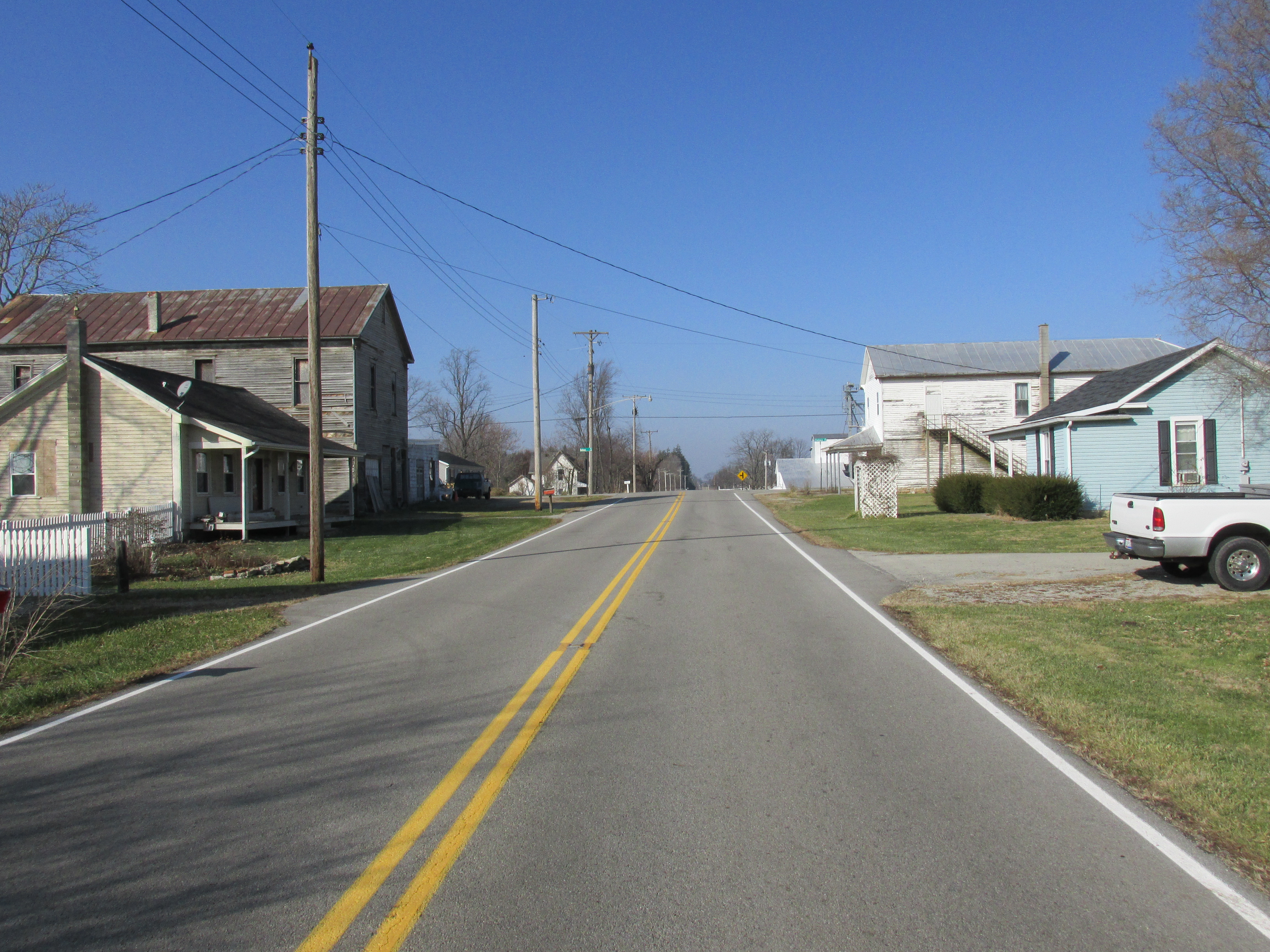
Looking north on Antioch Road in New Antioch
