= Jasper Township, Fayette County, Ohio =

Township in Ohio, US

- Township
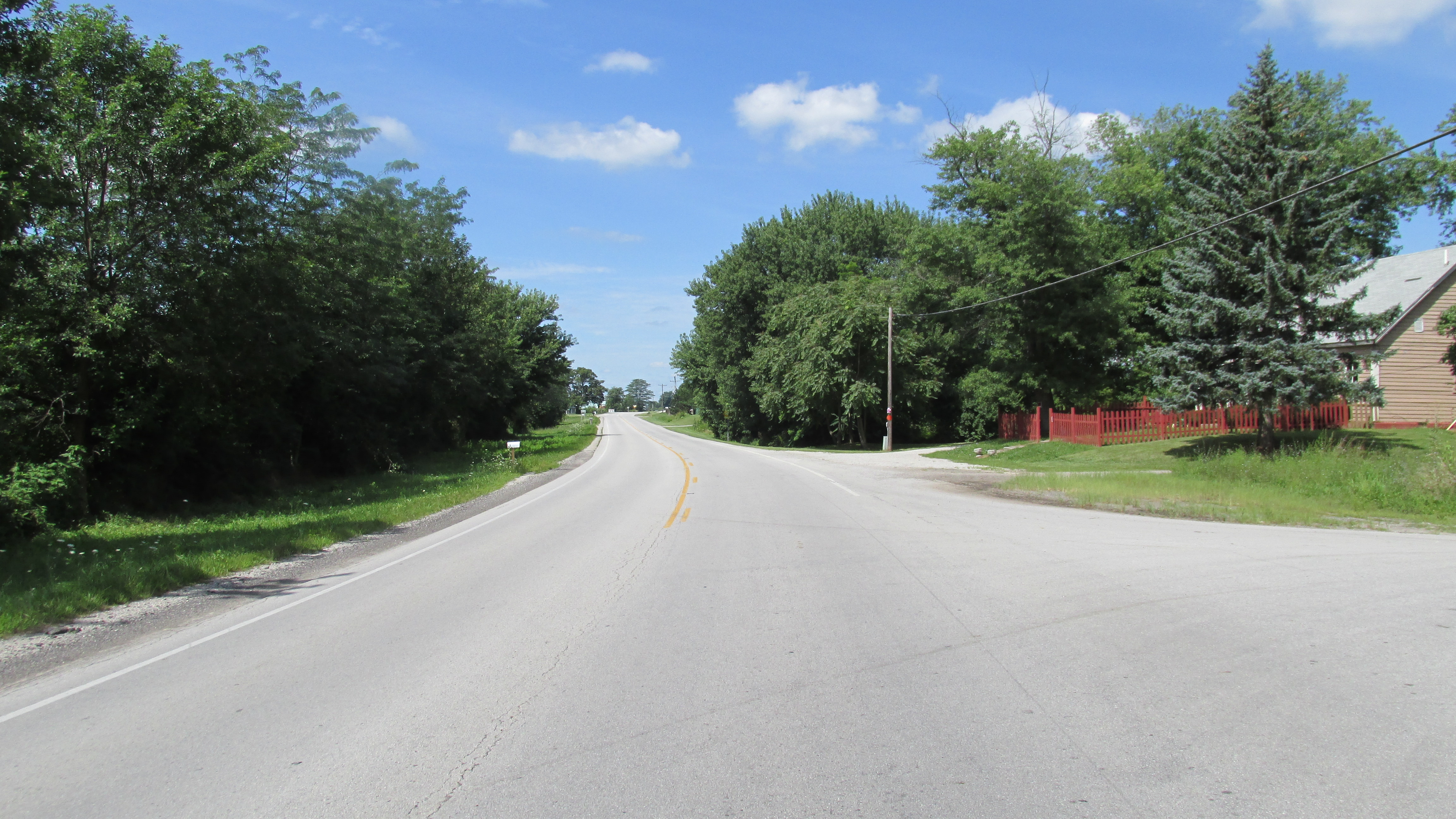
- U.S. Route 22 in Jasper Mills

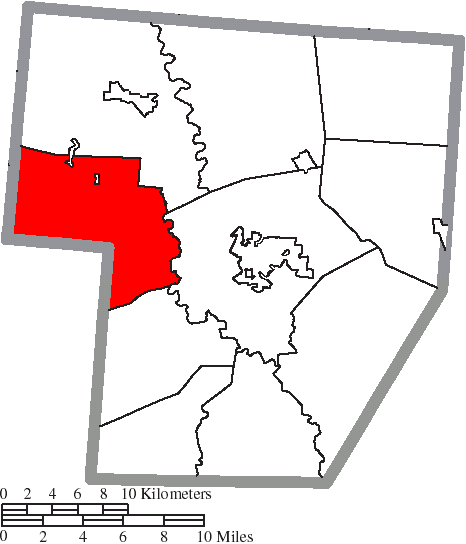
- Location of Jasper Township in Fayette County
- Coordinates: 39°34′32″N 83°36′32″W
- Country: United States
- State: Ohio
- County: Fayette

Area
  - Total: 41.1 sq mi (106.5 km^{2})
  - Land: 41.0 sq mi (106.2 km^{2})
  - Water: 0.12 sq mi (0.3 km^{2})
- Elevation: 1,037 ft (316 m)

Population (2020)
  - Total: 703
  - Density: 17.1/sq mi (6.62/km^{2})
- Time zone: UTC-5 (Eastern (EST))
  - Summer (DST): UTC-4 (EDT)
- FIPS code: 39-38388
- GNIS feature ID: 1086088

Jasper Township is one of the ten townships of Fayette County, Ohio, United States. As of the 2020 census the population was 703.

== Geography ==
Located in the western part of the county, it borders the following townships:

- Jefferson Township - north
- Union Township - east
- Concord Township - southeast
- Richland Township, Clinton County - south
- Wilson Township, Clinton County - southwest
- Jefferson Township, Greene County - west
- Silvercreek Township, Greene County - northwest

Two villages are located in Jasper Township: Milledgeville in the north, and part of Octa in the northwest.

Historical population
Census	Pop.	Note	%±
1990	839		—
2000	857		2.1%
2010	745		−13.1%
2020	703		−5.6%

== Name and history ==
While there is an unincorporated village named Jasper in Newton Township, Pike County, Ohio...this is the only Jasper Township statewide.

== Government ==
The township is governed by a three-member board of trustees, who are elected in November of odd-numbered years to a four-year term beginning on the following January 1. Two are elected in the year after the presidential election and one is elected in the year before it. There is also an elected township fiscal officer, who serves a four-year term beginning on April 1 of the year after the election, which is held in November of the year before the presidential election. Vacancies in the fiscal officership or on the board of trustees are filled by the remaining trustees.
