= Trebein, Ohio =

Unincorporated community in Ohio, U.S.

Coordinates: 39°42′20″N 83°59′07″W

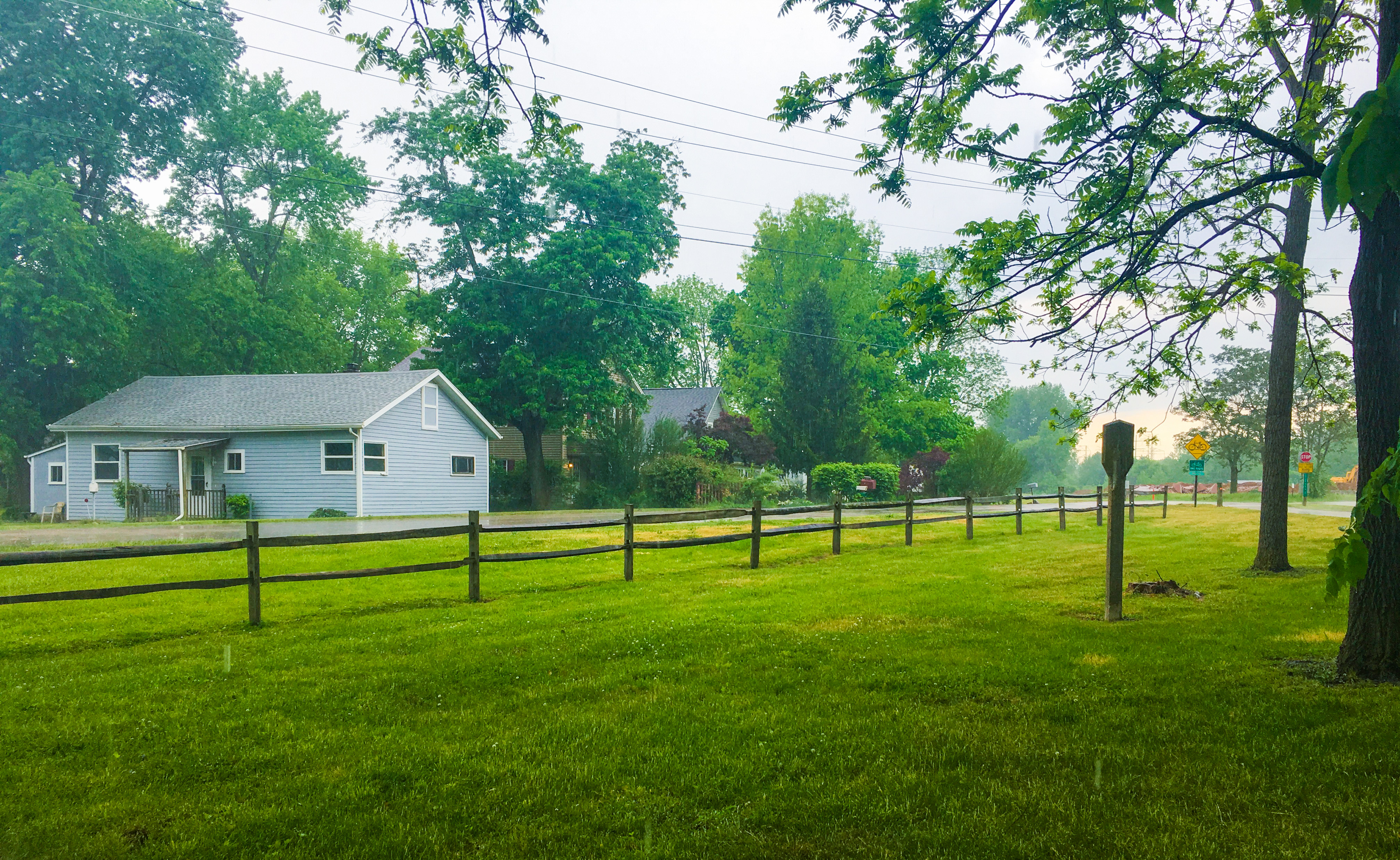
Trebein, Ohio, as seen from William Maxwell Rest Area on Creekside Trail, May 2018

Trebein is an unincorporated community in Beavercreek Township, Greene County, in the U.S. state of Ohio.

== History ==
A post office called Trebeins was established in 1878, and remained in operation until 1910. The community was named for F. C. Trebein, the proprietor of a distillery and mill.

The community has in the past also been known variously as Beaver, Beaver Station, Frost Station, Pickeneyville/Pinckneyvile/Pinkneyville, Trebins and Treibeins.
