= Pansy, Ohio =

Unincorporated community in Ohio, U.S.

Coordinates: 39°20′35″N 83°57′09″W

Pansy is an unincorporated community in Clinton County, in the U.S. state of Ohio.

== History ==
Pansy was not officially platted. A post office called Pansy was established in 1889, and remained in operation until 1902.

The local Pansy Methodist Church and School Historic District is listed on the National Register of Historic Places.
