= Spring Valley Township, Greene County, Ohio =

Township in Ohio, US

- Township
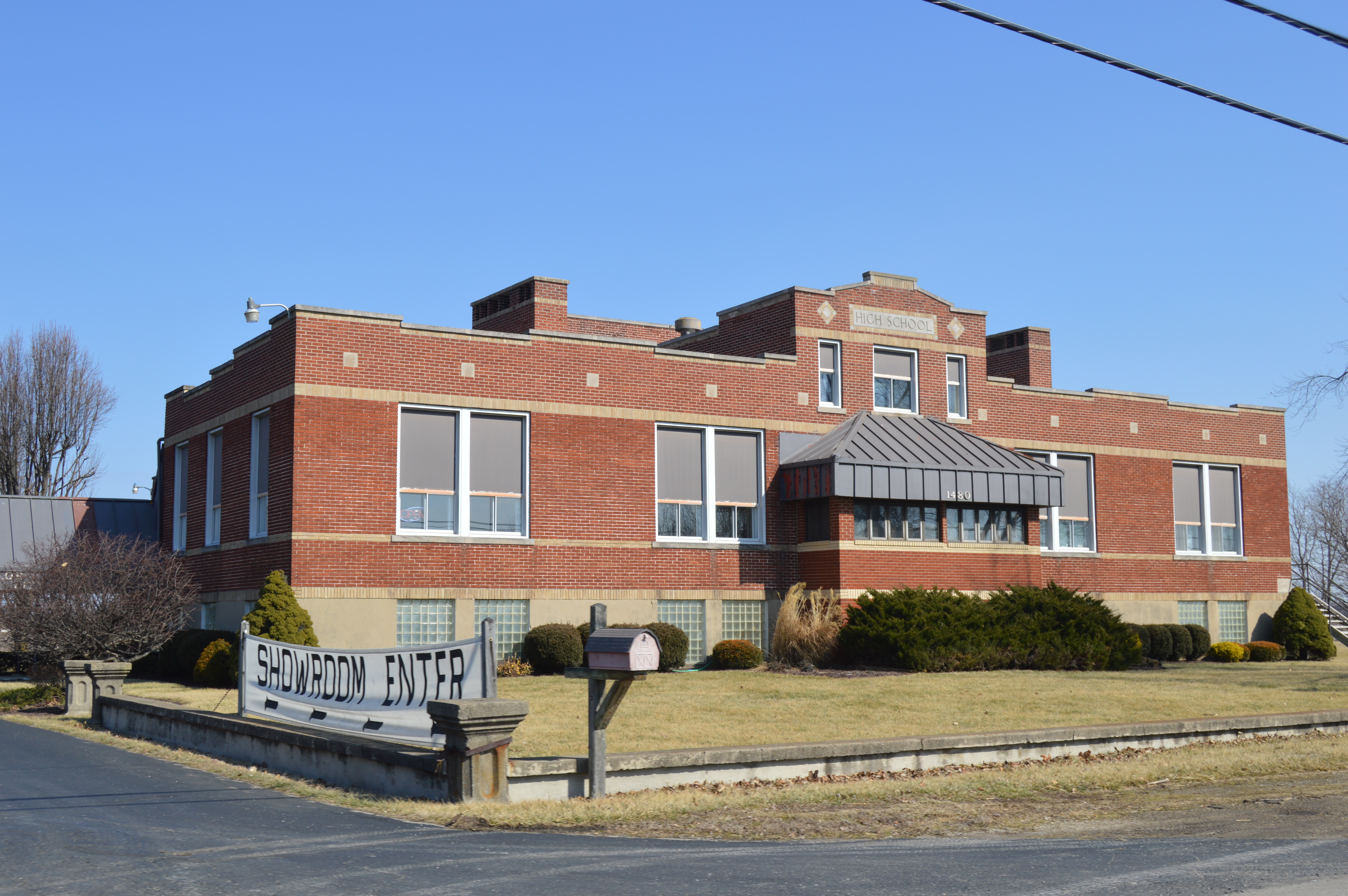
- Former township high school, now a bean bag chair factory

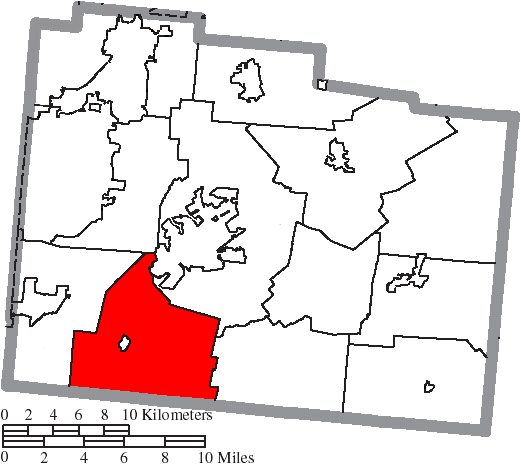
- Location of Spring Valley Township in Greene County
- Coordinates: 39°36′44″N 83°59′59″W
- Country: United States
- State: Ohio
- County: Greene

Area
  - Total: 34.6 sq mi (89.6 km^{2})
  - Land: 34.3 sq mi (88.8 km^{2})
  - Water: 0.31 sq mi (0.8 km^{2})
- Elevation: 741 ft (226 m)

Population (2020)
  - Total: 2,478
  - Density: 72.3/sq mi (27.9/km^{2})
- Time zone: UTC-5 (Eastern (EST))
  - Summer (DST): UTC-4 (EDT)
- ZIP code: 45370
- Area codes: 937 and 326
- FIPS code: 39-74223
- GNIS feature ID: 1086173
- Website: www.svtwp.org

Spring Valley Township is one of twelve townships of Greene County, Ohio, United States. As of the 2020 census, the population was 2,478.

== Geography ==
Located in the southwestern part of the county, it borders the following townships:

- Beavercreek Township - north
- Xenia Township - northeast
- Caesarscreek Township - east
- Sugarcreek Township - southeast
- Chester Township, Clinton County - southwest
- Wayne Township, Warren County - west

The village of Spring Valley is located in central Spring Valley Township.

The Little Miami River flows through Spring Valley Township. At the point where the river crosses the county line into Warren County is located Greene County's lowest point, 730 feet (220 m) above sea level.

== Name and history ==
Spring Valley Township was created in 1856.

It is the only Spring Valley Township statewide.

== Government ==
The township is governed by a three-member board of trustees, who are elected in November of odd-numbered years to a four-year term beginning on the following January 1. Two are elected in the year after the presidential election and one is elected in the year before it. There is also an elected township fiscal officer, who serves a four-year term beginning on April 1 of the year after the election, which is held in November of the year before the presidential election. Vacancies in the fiscal officership or on the board of trustees are filled by the remaining trustees.
