= Hillside Haven Mound =

Archaeological site in Ohio, United States

- U.S. National Register of Historic Places
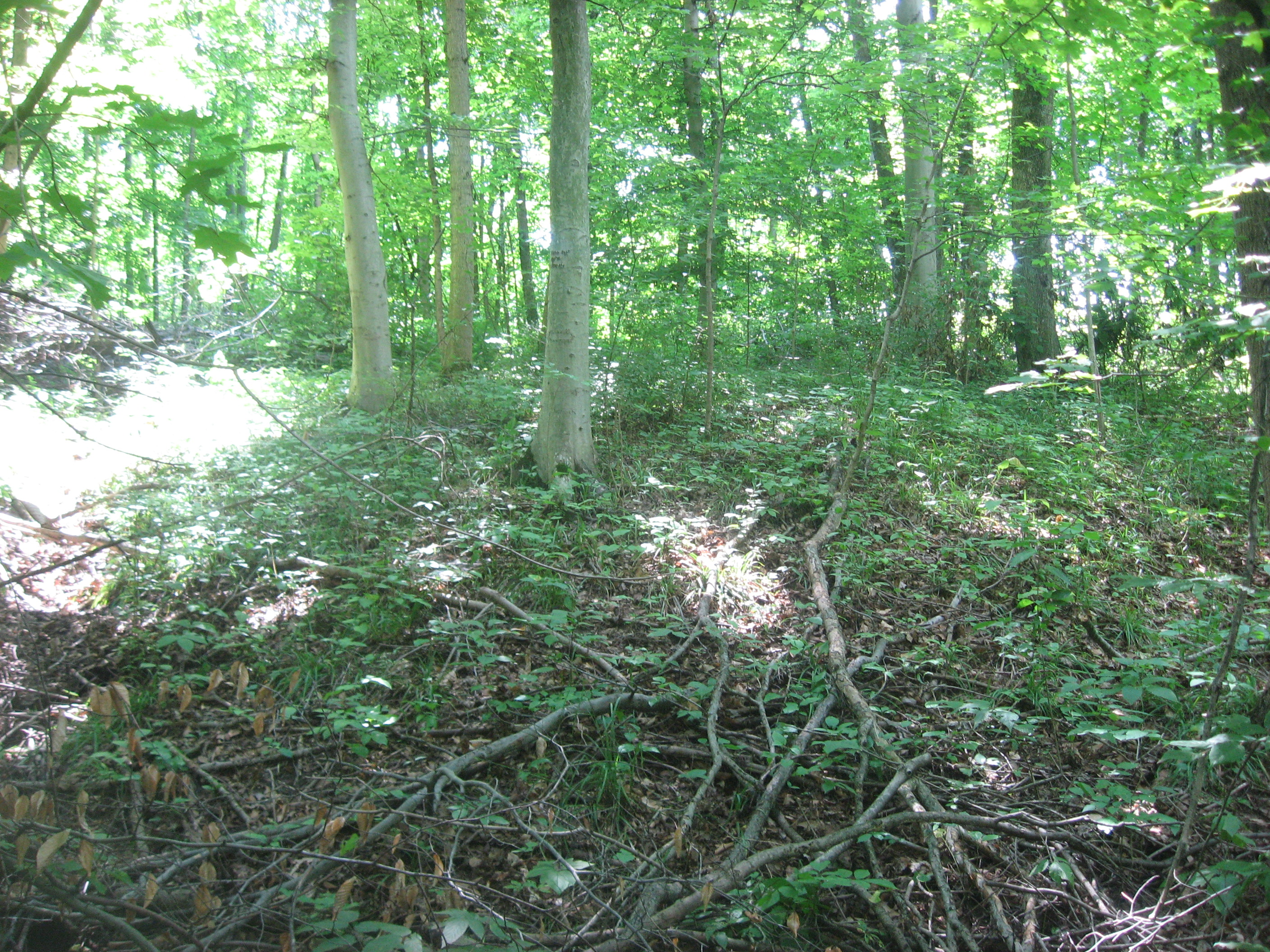
- Overview of the mound

- Location within Ohio Location within the United States
- Location: Thousand Trails Campground, 1786 State Route 380
- Nearest city: Oakland, Ohio
- Coordinates: 39°27′30″N 83°56′14″W
- Area: 1 acre (0.40 ha)
- NRHP reference No.: 78002026
- Added to NRHP: November 21, 1978

The Hillside Haven Mound (designated 33-Cn-14) is a Native American mound in the southwestern part of the U.S. state of Ohio. Located southwest of Oakland in Clinton County, it sits in dense woodland on the side of a hill. It is believed to have been conical in shape at the time of construction, but today it is rounded in shape, measuring 2.5 feet (0.76 m) high and 33 feet (10 m) in diameter.

During a test excavation of the mound and its immediate vicinity, archaeologists from Wilmington College found pieces of Adena pottery around the mound. Judging by findings from other Adena mound sites, the Hillside Haven Mound is believed to be a burial mound built over the body of a leading member of Adena society. Excavations of typical Adena mounds have demonstrated that the Adena culture typically built small log houses around the bodies of their dead leaders, ceremonially burned the houses, and heaped up mounds over the ruins of the houses. Although no detailed excavation has been conducted at Hillside Haven, all evidence found around points to the conclusion that it is a typical Adena mound, with both ceremonial and functional items within.

In 1978, the Hillside Haven Mound was listed on the National Register of Historic Places because of its value as an archaeological site. As one of the last remaining Native American mounds in Clinton County, it is a rare survivor of Native American prehistory in the region, and its unusually good state of preservation only increases its significance. Contributing to its near-perfect condition is its location along a trail at a campground, which was formerly known as Hillside Haven.

Four other Clinton County archaeological sites are listed on the Register: the Hurley and Keiter Mounds, the Cowan Creek Circular Enclosure, and the Beam Farm Woodland Archaeological District.
