= Beam Farm Woodland Archaeological District =

Archaeological site in Ohio, United States

- Beam Farm Woodland Archeological District
- U.S. National Register of Historic Places
- U.S. Historic district
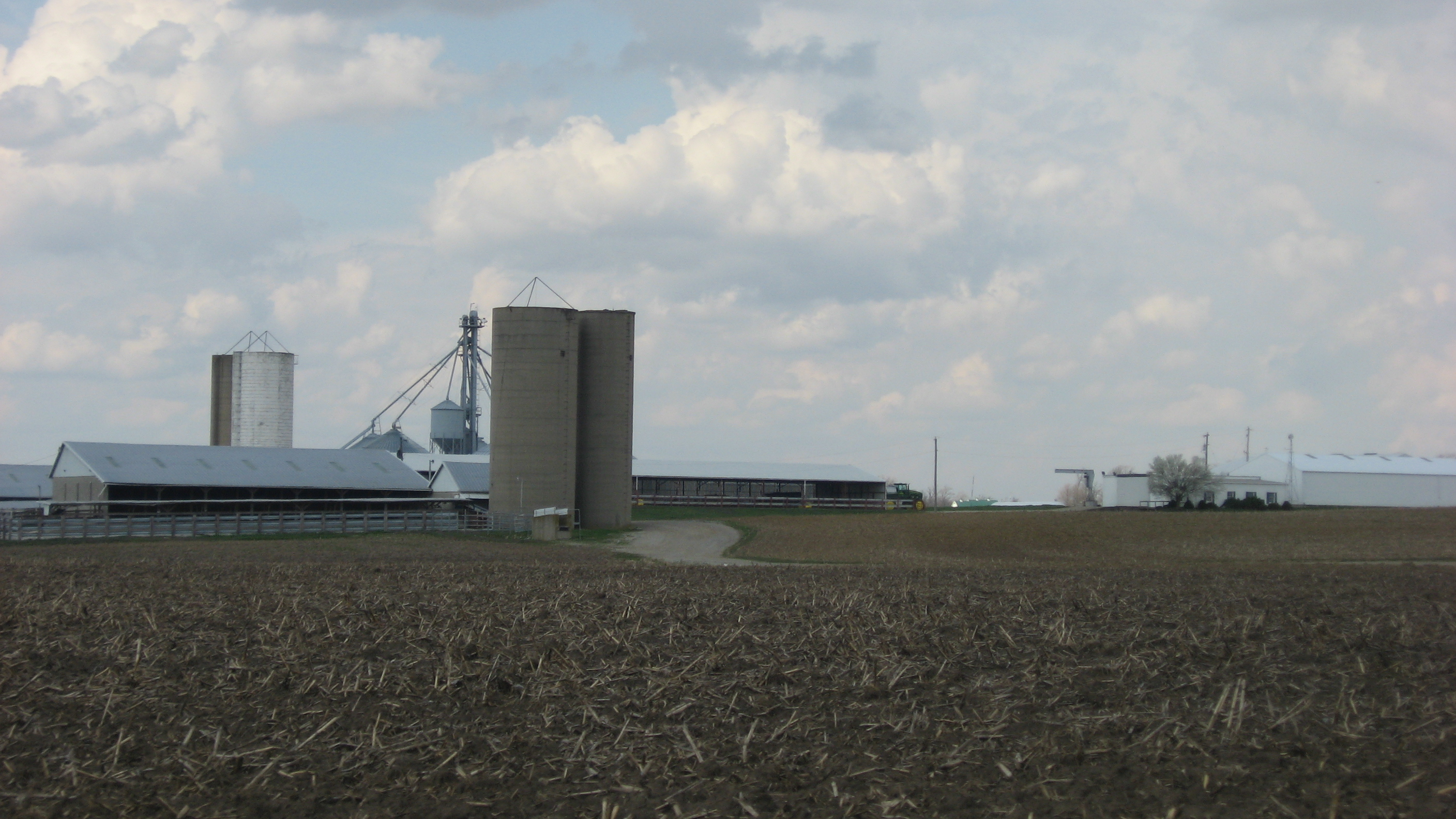
- Overview of the district

- Location within Ohio Location within the United States
- Location: 3983 Stone Road
- Nearest city: Sabina, Ohio
- Coordinates: 39°29′20″N 83°43′4″W
- Area: 2 acres (0.81 ha)
- NRHP reference No.: 05000340
- Added to NRHP: March 22, 2006

The Beam Farm Woodland Archaeological District is a group of archaeological sites in the southwestern part of the U.S. state of Ohio. Located at 3983 Stone Road near the village of Sabina in Clinton County, the district is composed of one Native American mound and two other archaeological sites spread out over an area of 2 acres (0.81 ha). Known as the Beam Farm Mound and the Beam Sites 9 and 12 (designated 33-CN-194, 33-CN-195, and 33-CN-208 respectively), the sites that compose the district have yielded artifacts from the Adena culture and the Hopewell tradition, both of which inhabited southwestern Ohio during the Woodland period. Because both the Adena and the Hopewell lived around the mound, and because both cultures built mounds, the identity of the people who constructed the Beam Farm Mound cannot be established; all that can be known with reasonable certainty is that it was raised during the early or middle portion of the Woodland period, or between 800 BC and AD 500.

Although small, the Beam Farm Mound is significant as a well-preserved relic of Native American prehistory. The Beam family, which owns the property on which the district is located, has never permitted any excavation of the mound. At the same time, this has prevented conclusive identification of its builders, they have ensured that the mound remains undisturbed and pristine in the fields above the Anderson Fork. The owners and the Ohio Historical Society cooperated to place a historical marker at the site in 2001. Because of the archaeological value of the mound and the other sites, they were declared a historic district and listed on the National Register of Historic Places in 2006. It joined four other Clinton County sites already on the Register: the Cowan Creek Circular Enclosure and the Keiter, Hurley, and Hillside Haven Mounds.
