= Pansy Methodist Church =

Historic church in Ohio, United States

- Pansy Methodist Church and School Historic District
- U.S. National Register of Historic Places
- U.S. Historic district
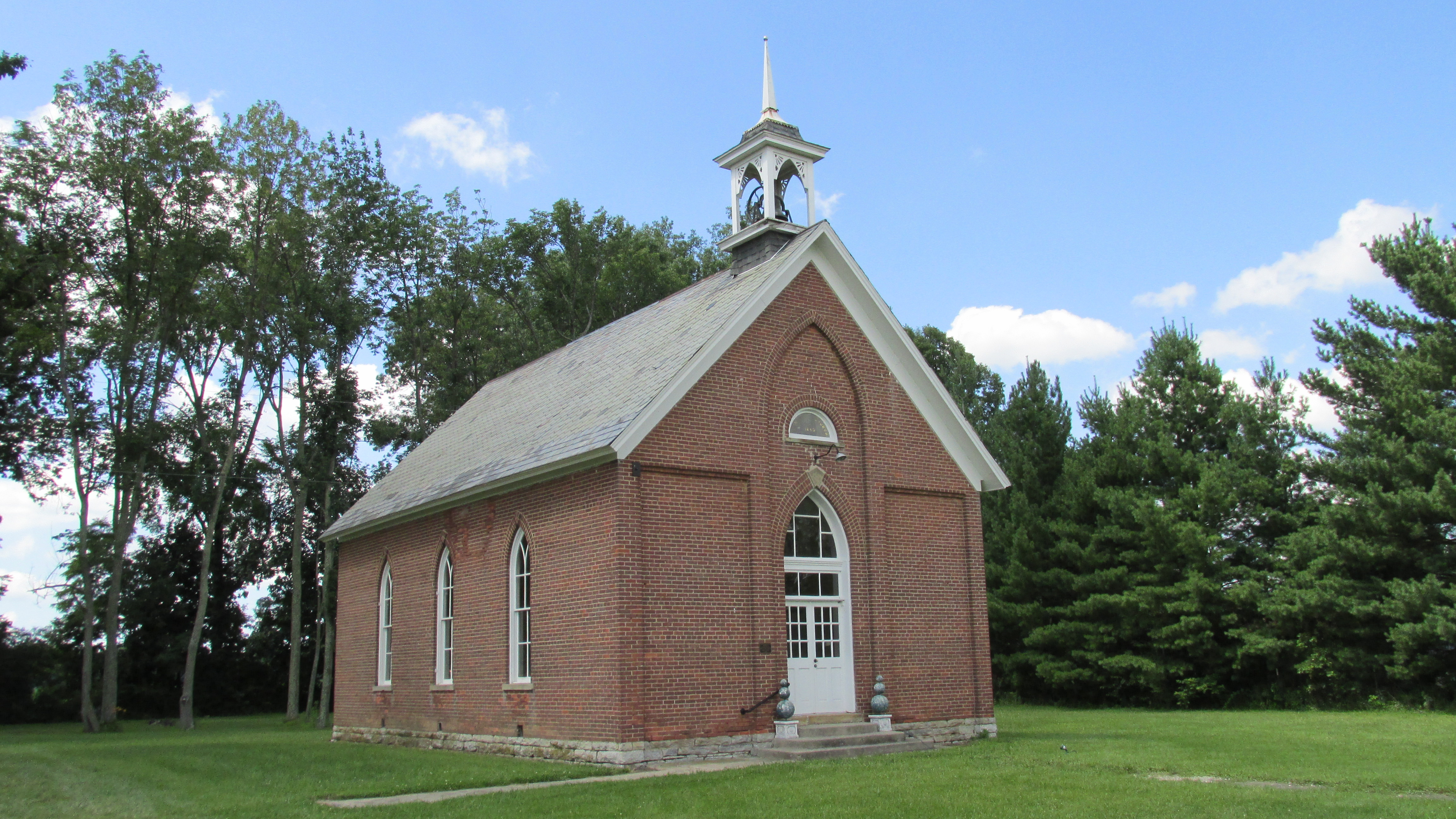
- Front of the church

- Location within Ohio Location within the United States
- Nearest city: Clarksville, Ohio
- Coordinates: 39°20′55″N 83°56′41″W
- Area: 2.1 acres (0.85 ha)
- Built: 1885
- Architectural style: Gothic Revival, Romanesque Revival
- NRHP reference No.: 73001398
- Added to NRHP: March 20, 1973

Pansy Methodist Church is a historic church at Pansy in Clinton County, Ohio, United States. Built in 1885, it was formerly home to a congregation of the Methodist Episcopal Church. Few changes have been made to the church or to its adjacent church school since they were built: neither building has any central heating or plumbing, and the interiors retain the open, undivided floor plans with which they were designed.

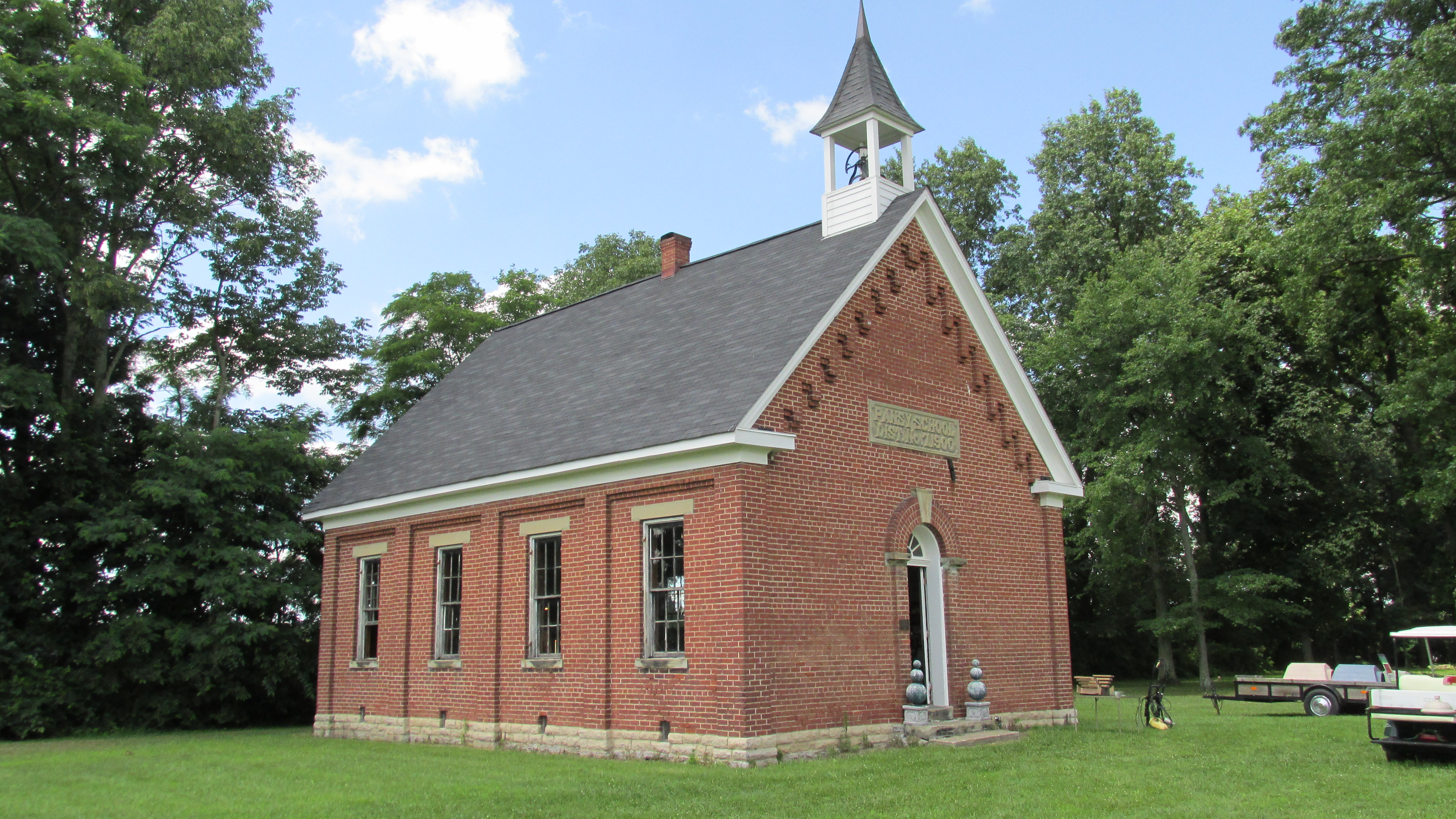
Pansy School

Built in 1885 and 1900 respectively, the church and school are a mix of architectural styles. Measuring approximately 28 by 46 feet (8.5 by 14.0 m), the church is a Gothic Revival building with three ogive windows on each side; worshippers entered through a large front door in a Gothic arched doorway with a transom light. A small tower with a belfry sits atop the roof at the front of the church; it is decorated with ornate latticework. Nearby, the school measures 29 by 40 feet (8.8 by 12.2 m); its Romanesque Revival style is evidenced by elements such as pilasters on the corners and decorative brickwork below the roofline. Both buildings are constructed of brick on stone foundations and feature slate roofs.

In 1973, the church and school were designated a historic district and listed on the National Register of Historic Places, due to their historically significant architecture. Key to this designation was their place as a rare example of the nineteenth-century country church; they were seen as evoking a sense of historic rural Christianity in the region.
