= Chester Township, Clinton County, Ohio =

Township in Ohio, US

- Township
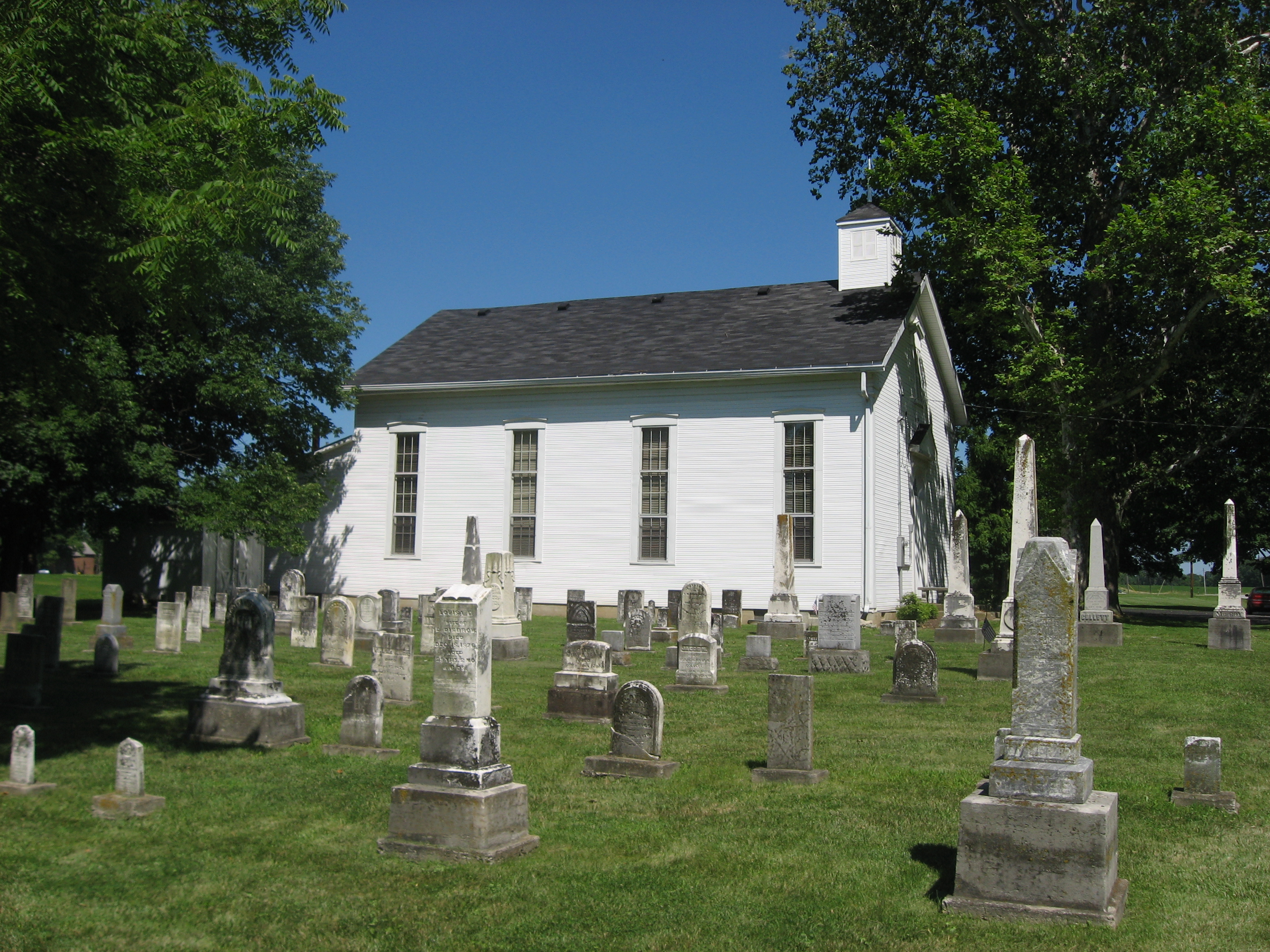
- Jonahs Run Baptist Church

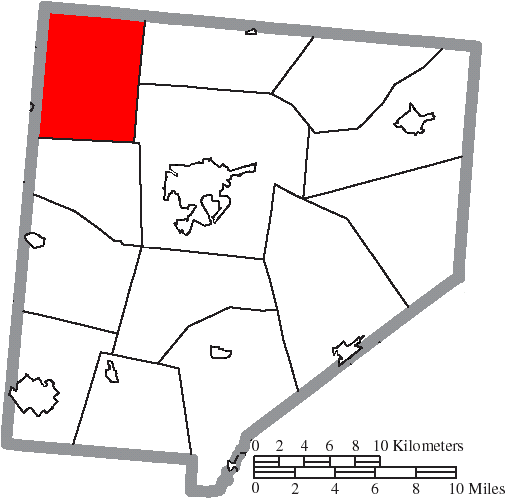
- Location of Chester Township in Clinton County
- Coordinates: 39°31′12″N 83°56′26″W
- Country: United States
- State: Ohio
- County: Clinton

Area
  - Total: 31.9 sq mi (82.7 km^{2})
  - Land: 31.6 sq mi (81.8 km^{2})
  - Water: 0.35 sq mi (0.9 km^{2})
- Elevation: 1,001 ft (305 m)

Population (2020)
  - Total: 2,027
  - Density: 64.2/sq mi (24.8/km^{2})
- Time zone: UTC-5 (Eastern (EST))
  - Summer (DST): UTC-4 (EDT)
- FIPS code: 39-13974
- GNIS feature ID: 1085877

Chester Township is one of the thirteen townships of Clinton County, Ohio, United States. As of the 2020 census the population was 2,027.

== Geography ==
Located in the northwest corner of the county, it borders the following townships:

- Caesarscreek Township, Greene County - northeast
- Liberty Township - east
- Union Township - southeast
- Adams Township - south
- Massie Township, Warren County - southwest
- Wayne Township, Warren County - west
- Spring Valley Township, Greene County - northwest

Caesar Creek State Park is partially located in Chester Township.

No municipalities are located in Chester Township.

New Burlington is a ghost town contained in the township.

== Transportation ==
Major roads are Interstate 71 and State Routes 73 and 380.

== Name and history ==
Chester Township was organized in 1810.

It is one of five Chester Townships statewide.

== Government ==
The township is governed by a three-member board of trustees, who are elected in November of odd-numbered years to a four-year term beginning on the following January 1. Two are elected in the year after the presidential election and one is elected in the year before it. There is also an elected township fiscal officer, who serves a four-year term beginning on April 1 of the year after the election, which is held in November of the year before the presidential election. Vacancies in the fiscal officership or on the board of trustees are filled by the remaining trustees.
