= Liberty Township, Clinton County, Ohio =

Township in Ohio, US

- Township
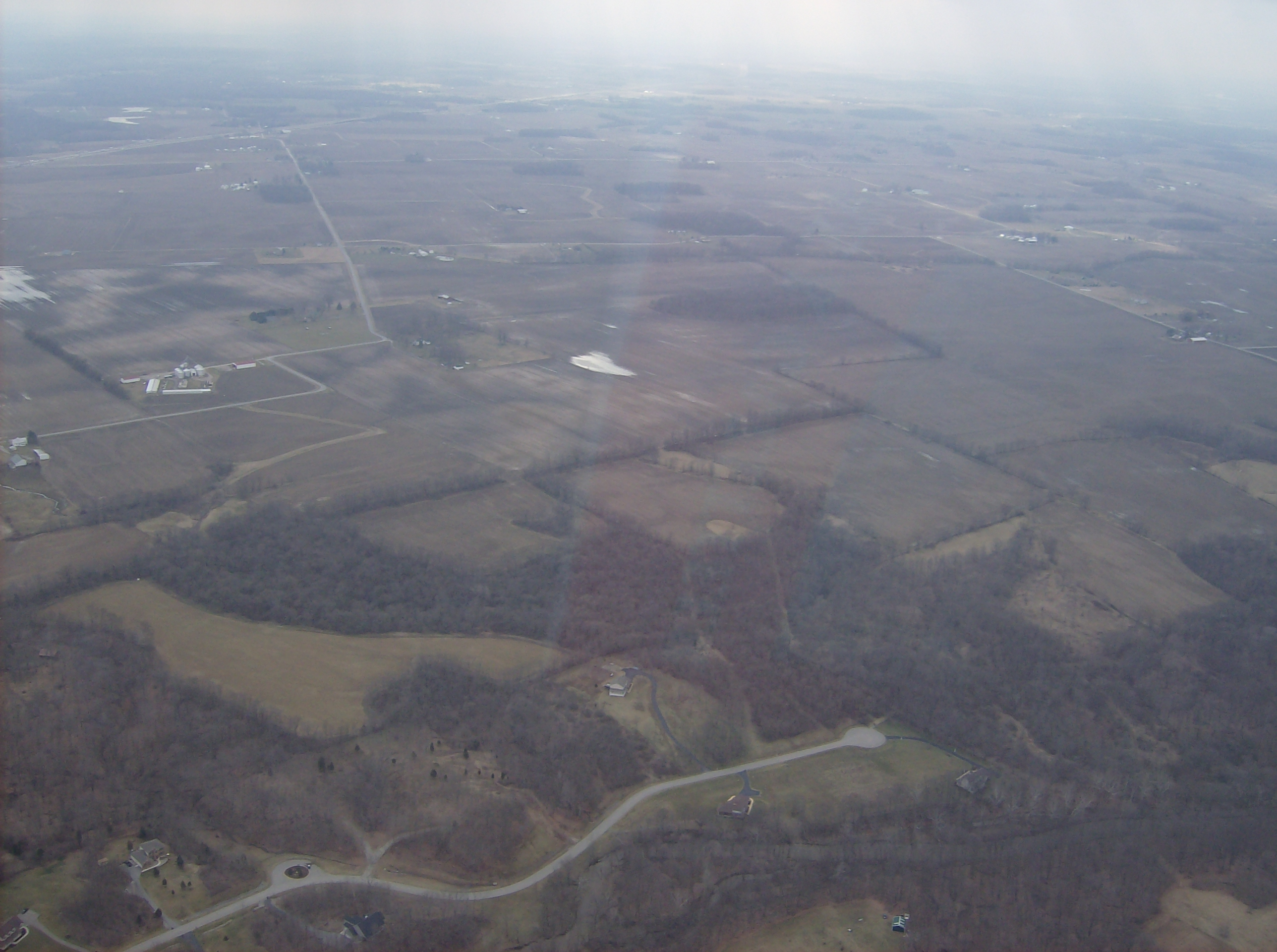
- Countryside in southwestern Liberty Township

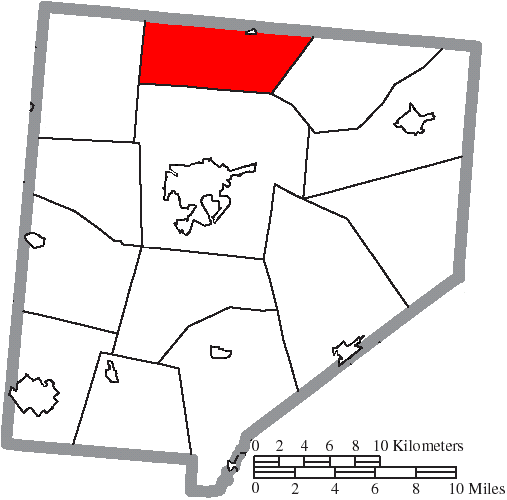
- Location of Liberty Township in Clinton County
- Coordinates: 39°32′14″N 83°47′53″W
- Country: United States
- State: Ohio
- County: Clinton

Area
  - Total: 24.8 sq mi (64.3 km^{2})
  - Land: 24.6 sq mi (63.8 km^{2})
  - Water: 0.15 sq mi (0.4 km^{2})
- Elevation: 1,030 ft (314 m)

Population (2020)
  - Total: 1,123
- Time zone: UTC-5 (Eastern (EST))
  - Summer (DST): UTC-4 (EDT)
- FIPS code: 39-43064
- GNIS feature ID: 1085881

Liberty Township is one of the thirteen townships of Clinton County, Ohio, United States. The 2020 census reported 1,123 people living in the township.

== Geography ==
Located in the northern part of the county, it borders the following townships:

- Jefferson Township, Greene County - northeast
- Wilson Township - east
- Union Township - south
- Chester Township - west
- Caesarscreek Township, Greene County - northwest

It is located in the north central part of the county on the Greene County line about halfway between Wilmington and Xenia.

The entire township lies in the Virginia Military District.

The village of Port William is located in northern Liberty Township.

== Transportation ==
Major roads in Liberty Township include Interstate 71, U.S. Route 68, and State Route 134.

== Name and history ==
Liberty Township was organized in 1817.

It is one of twenty-five Liberty Townships statewide.

In 1833, Liberty Township contained a flouring mill, two saw mills, a fulling mill, a distillery, and one store.

== Government ==
The township is governed by a three-member board of trustees, who are elected in November of odd-numbered years to a four-year term beginning on the following January 1. Two are elected in the year after the presidential election and one is elected in the year before it. There is also an elected township fiscal officer, who serves a four-year term beginning on April 1 of the year after the election, which is held in November of the year before the presidential election. Vacancies in the fiscal officership or on the board of trustees are filled by the remaining trustees.
