= Anderson Fork =

Stream in Clinton and Greene County, Ohio, U.S.

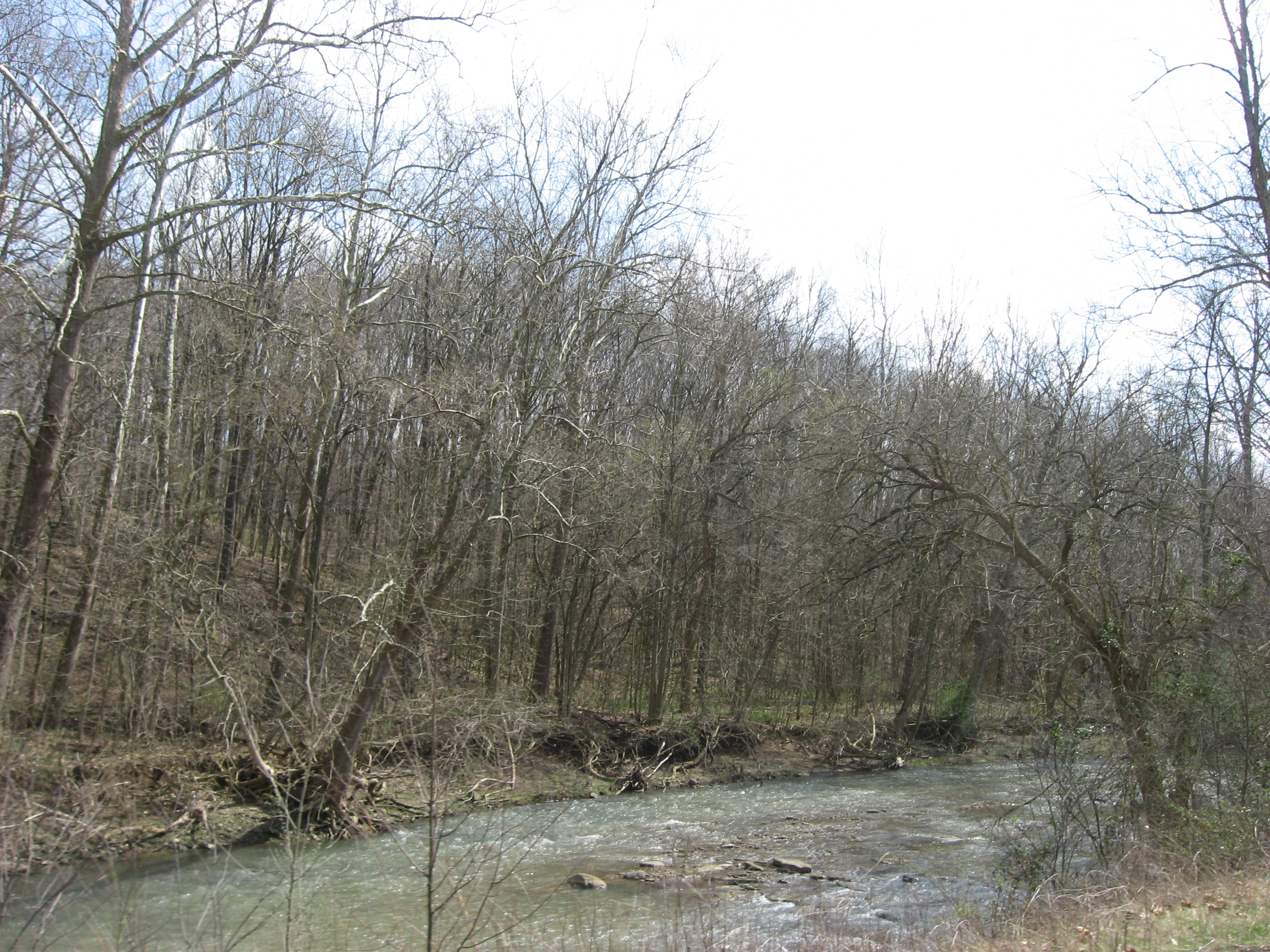
Looking upstream from the McKay Road bridge in Liberty Township

Anderson Fork is a stream in Clinton and Greene counties, Ohio, in the United States.

Anderson Fork was named for Richard C. Anderson, a government surveyor.

== Location ==
- Mouth: Confluence with Caesar Creek, Clinton County at 39°33′55″N 83°58′11″W
- Source: Clinton County at 39°25′55″N 83°38′18″W

== See also ==
- List of rivers of Ohio
