= Keiter Mound =

Archaeological site in Ohio, United States

- U.S. National Register of Historic Places
- Location within Ohio Location within the United States
- Location: In woods west of McKay Rd., atop a bluff overlooking the Anderson Fork
- Nearest city: Wilmington, Ohio
- Coordinates: 39°32′52.5″N 83°52′46.5″W
- Area: 8 acres (3.2 ha)
- NRHP reference No.: 75001346
- Added to NRHP: October 21, 1975

The Keiter Mound (designated 33-Cn-15) is a Native American mound in the southwestern part of the U.S. state of Ohio. Located north of the city of Wilmington, it sits on a wooded hill above the stream bottom of a small secondary creek, the Anderson Fork. About 5.5 feet (1.7 m) tall at its highest point, the mound measures 58 feet (18 m) from north to south and 65 feet (20 m) from east to west.

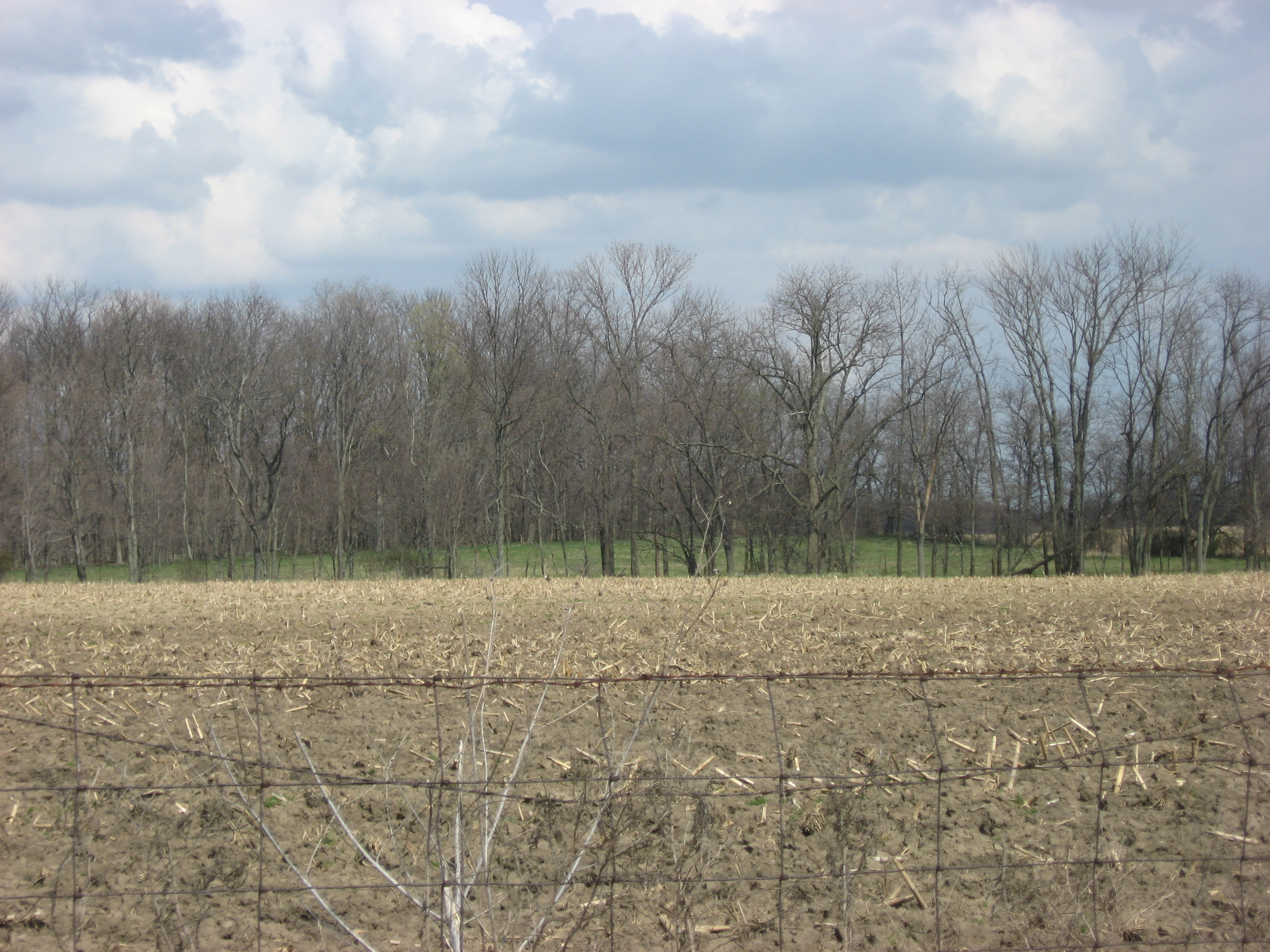
Woods within which the mound is located

Due to its location, the Keiter Mound is believed to be a work of Hopewellian peoples. Unlike many Hopewell sites, such as the Newark Earthworks or Mound City, the Keiter Mound is isolated: no other mounds and no large geometric earthworks are located nearby. As such, it is likely to have been created by small groups of transient hunters who camped in the valley below. This identification is based on the mound's location and comparison with similar mounds: as the mound has never been substantially excavated, it likely holds the same grave goods as it did when it was constructed thousands of years ago. The top is flat and slightly scarred, possibly from an early excavation, but for all practical purposes the mound is in pristine condition. For this reason, it is a significant archaeological site: it is an unusually well preserved example of isolate Hopewell construction and might be able to yield important information about the Hopewell way of life. In recognition of its archaeological significance, the Keiter Mound was listed on the National Register of Historic Places in 1975.
