= Virginia Military District =

Coordinates: 39°30′N 83°30′W

Map of Ohio showing the Virginia Military District in green

The Virginia Military District was an approximately 4.2 million acre (17,000 km^{2}) area of land in what is now the state of Ohio that was reserved by Virginia to use as payment in lieu of cash for its veterans of the American Revolutionary War.

Virginia had historic claims to much of the Northwest Territory, which included Ohio, dating from its colonial charter. Virginia and the other states ceded their claims over western lands to overcome other states' objections to ratifying the Articles of Confederation. In return for ceding its claims in 1784, Virginia was granted this area to provide military bounty land grants. The Ohio district was a surplus reserve, in that military land grants were first made in an area southeast of the Ohio River, in what is now Kentucky. The Ohio land was to be used only after the land southeast of the river was exhausted.

== Location ==
The land was located in southern Ohio, bordered by the Ohio River on the south, the Little Miami River on the west, and the Scioto River on the east and the north. The District encompassed all of the following Ohio counties: Adams, Brown, Clinton, Clermont, Highland, Fayette, Madison, and Union, and portions of these counties: Scioto, Pike, Ross, Pickaway, Franklin, Delaware, Marion, Hardin, Logan, Clark, Greene, Champaign. Warren, Hamilton, and Auglaize.

== Settlement ==
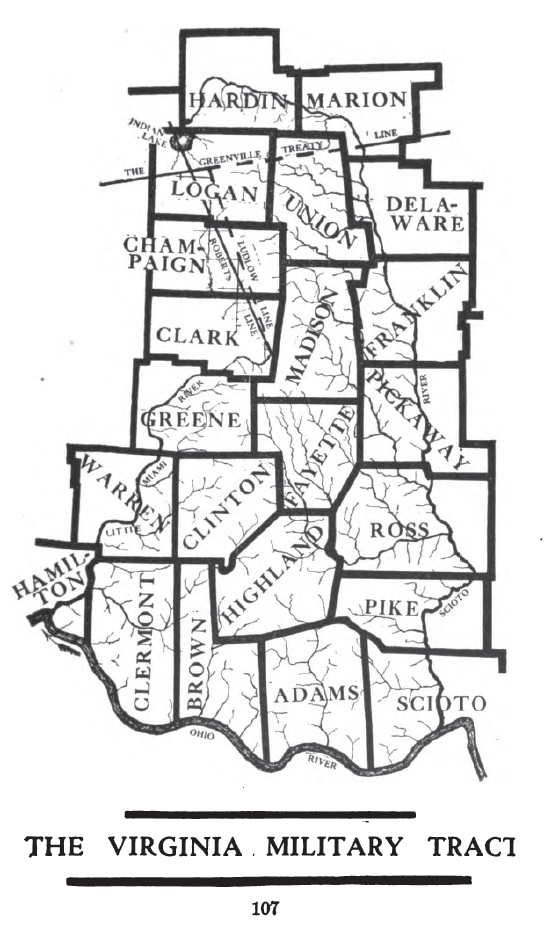
Map of the Virginia Military District with modern counties shown.

The District was opened for settlement in 1794, although surveys had begun in the 1780s. Surveys were done using the metes and bounds method used in Virginia, rather than the Public Land Survey System established by the Land Ordinance of 1785 used for most of the Northwest Territory. The precise boundaries of the district was a subject of contention for many years, involving multiple acts of Congress and a Supreme Court decision (Doddridge vs. Thompson et al., 9 Wheaton 469). Further complicating the matter was the ambiguous location of the line established with the Treaty of Greenville, which separated Native American lands from lands open to white settlers and which ran through the northern portion of the District.

Virginia issued bounty land grants in this District until Ohio became a state in 1803. However, rampant land speculation and outright frauds produced a contentious muddle in land titles for many years afterward. Congress extended the time allowed for claims to be made several times. The last extension act was passed on March 3, 1855, allowing two years for claims made prior to January 1, 1852, to be surveyed and patented. After two years, unsurveyed lands became property of the United States. On February 18, 1871, this unsurveyed and unsold land was ceded by the federal government to the state of Ohio.

In 1872, the Ohio legislature gave this land to the Ohio Agricultural and Mechanical College (now the Ohio State University). The college trustees aggressively claimed lands where there was not clear title, sometimes uprooting families who had been farming the land for 75 years. This caused such an uproar that Congress was forced to act, and on May 27, 1880, passed legislation limiting the rights of the college to unappropriated lands. Some provisions of this legislation opened the doors to a new round of legal wrangling.

Massie's Station (now Manchester, Ohio), founded in 1791, was the first permanent settlement in the District, named after Nathaniel Massie, a surveyor and land speculator. He also founded Chillicothe, Ohio in 1796.

Many Virginians who settled in the area never owned slaves, although numerous settlers freed or sold their slaves before departing for Ohio, due to the provisions of the Northwest Ordinance of 1787.

== Process of claiming land ==
Virginia soldiers of the Continental line, who served in the Revolutionary War, were eligible to procure a bounty award in the form of land, according to a formula based on rank and time of service. The first step was to secure a proper certificate of service and then to acquire a printed warrant from the land office in Virginia specifying the quantity of land. This warrant empowered the person to whom it was given, or heirs and assignees, to select the specified area from anywhere within the military reserve district. After the location was chosen and boundaries surveyed, the owner of the warrant exchanged it for a patent, which was equivalent to a deed in fee simple and passed all title of the government to the holder.

Significant numbers of the warrants were sold, and it was estimated that 25% of the District was purchased by 25 men. The land was never divided into regular townships, as in the Public Lands Survey System. Instead, land was divided based on the Virginia custom of "metes and bounds." Land boundaries were defined by natural features—trees, boulders, and bodies of water. This resulted in irregularly-shaped land claims, as claimants vied to get the best land. As a result, there were frequently competing and overlapping claims.

== Surveyors ==
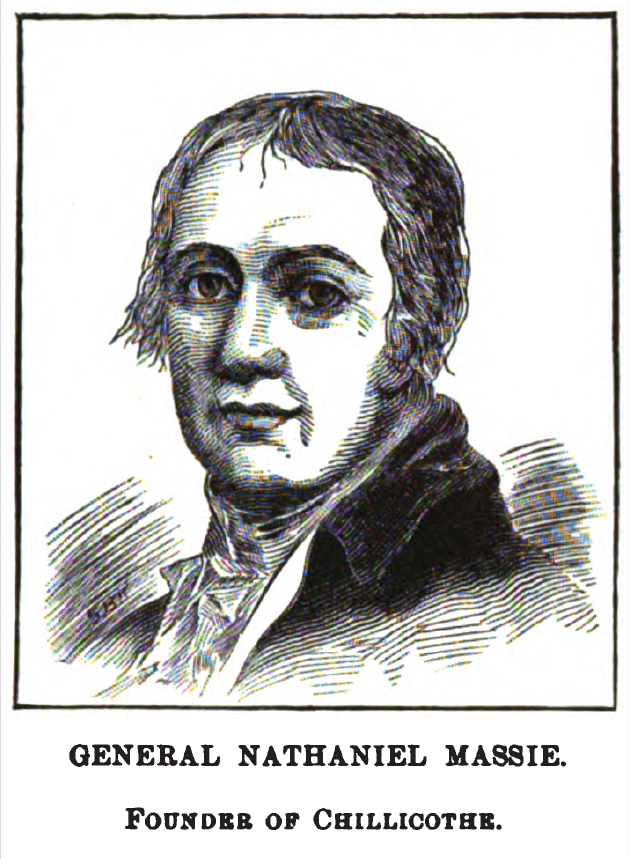
Nathaniel Massie

- Richard Clough Anderson Sr.—principal surveyor 1783 - 1819
- William Marshall Anderson—son of Richard Clough Anderson Sr.
- Joseph Kerr
- Allen Latham—son-in-law of Richard Clough Anderson
- Nathaniel Massie—1791, 1793–1796.

== See also ==
- Fussell v. Gregg, 113 U.S. 550 (1885) -- A U.S. Supreme Court case over a land dispute stemming from this period.
