= Ohio State Route 729 =

State highway in Ohio, United States

State Route 729

Route information
- Maintained by ODOT
- Length: 33.58 mi (54.04 km)
- Existed: 1937–present

Major junctions
- South end: SR 73 / SR 350 near New Vienna
- US 22 / SR 3 in Sabina
- North end: SR 323 near Jefferson

Location
- Country: United States
- State: Ohio
- Counties: Clinton, Fayette, Madison

Highway system
- Ohio State Highway System; Interstate; US; State; Scenic
← SR 728	→ SR 730

State Route 729 (SR 729) is a state highway in central Ohio. The 33.58-mile-long (54.04 km) route runs from SR 73 and SR 350 in the community of Snow Hill, northwest of New Vienna to SR 323 north of Jeffersonville.

== Route description ==
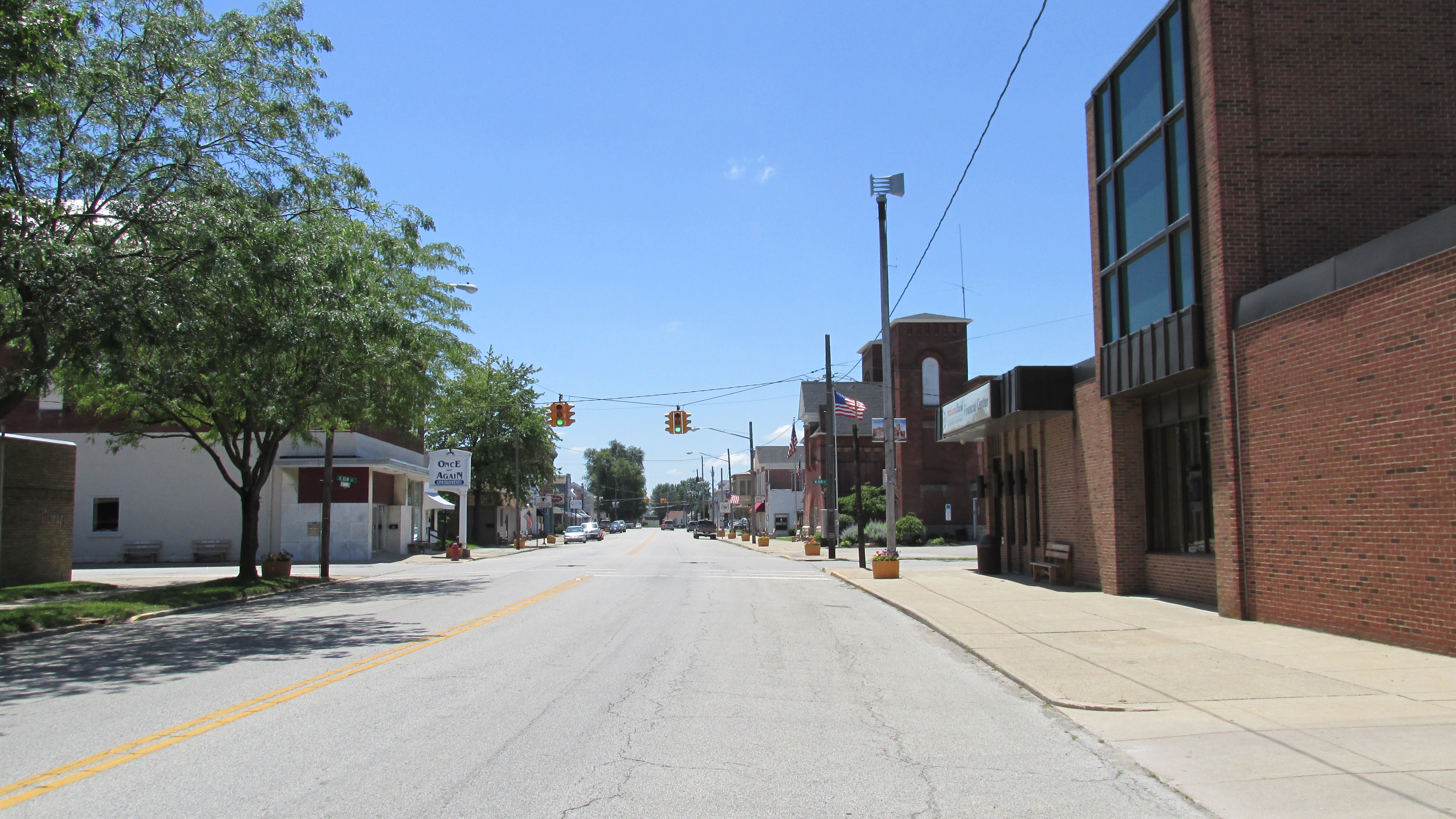
Scene in Sabina

SR 729 begins at an intersection with SR 73 and SR 350 in the Green Township, Clinton County community of Snow Hill. Routes 73 and 350 formed a concurrency 1,300 feet (0.40 km) northwest of the southern terminus; the routes together head southeast to New Vienna. SR 729 heads northeast through Lees Creek/Centerville and across SR 72 before making a sharp turn towards the northwest towards Sabina. In the center of Sabina, the route intersects US 22 / SR 3 (Washington Street). The route then passes through more farmland, enters Fayette County, crosses the Rattlesnake Creek, and makes another sharp left turn at Palmer Road (County Road 11). After acting as the main street through Milledgeville, the route passes over the US 35 freeway and comes to an roundabout intersection with SR 435, the former routing of US 35. SR 729 turns right onto SR 435 forming a concurrency (straight ahead at the roundabout is Bluegrass Boulevard). About 1.2 miles (1.9 km) later, SR 435 ends, Old US 35 continues ahead as County Road 35, and SR 729 heads north towards Jeffersonville.

The route goes through more flat farmland before crossing over I-71 without an interchange and entering the village limits of Jeffersonville. In Jeffersonville, it first travels on Plymouth Street, makes a 90-degree left turn onto Janes Street, makes another 90-degree turn, but to the right onto South Street, and reaches an intersection with State Street which also carries SR 41 and SR 734. The three routes head northwest into the center of town on State Street and South Main Street. At High Street, SR 734 heads west on High Street towards Jamestown, SR 41 continues north to South Solon, and SR 729 turns right. North of Jeffersonville, the route makes three more 90-degree S-curves before entering Madison County. SR 729 ends at an intersection with SR 323 between the villages of South Solon and Midway.

== History ==
SR 729 was first designated in 1937 between what was then US 35 near Octa and Milledgevile (now the eastern terminus of SR 435) and its present northern terminus. In 1940, the route was extended south on a new alignment to Sabina and took over SR 350 from SR 73 to Sabina (SR 350 at that time ran east of SR 350 instead of ending in New Vienna as it does today). No major changes have occurred to the routing since then.

== Major intersections ==
County	Location	mi	km	Destinations	Notes
Clinton	Green Township	0.00	0.00	SR 73 / SR 350 – New Vienna, Wilmington	
Clinton	Wayne Township	7.63	12.28	SR 72 – Jamestown, Highland	
Clinton	Sabina	12.71	20.45	US 22 / SR 3 (Washington Street)	
Fayette	Jasper–Jefferson township line	22.44	36.11	SR 435 west (Old US 35) to US 35 / I-71 – Xenia	Southern end of SR 435 concurrency; roundabout
Fayette	Jasper Township	23.61	38.00	SR 435 ends / CR 35 (Old US 35) – Washington Court House	Northern end of SR 435 concurrency
Fayette	Jeffersonville	26.86	43.23	SR 41 south / SR 734 east (State Street)	Southern end of SR 41 / SR 734 concurrency
Fayette	Jeffersonville	27.17	43.73	SR 41 north (Main Street) / SR 734 west (High Street)	Northern end of SR 41 / SR 734 concurrency
Madison	Stokes Township	33.58	54.04	SR 323 – South Solon, Midway	
1.000 mi = 1.609 km; 1.000 km = 0.621 mi: Concurrency terminus
