= Ohio State Route 435 =

State highway in Fayette County, Ohio, US

State Route 435

Route information
- Maintained by ODOT
- Length: 4.084 mi (6.573 km)
- Existed: 2003–present

Major junctions
- West end: US 35 near Octa
- I-71 in Octa; US 35 near Milledgeville
- East end: SR 729 near Milledgeville

Location
- Country: United States
- State: Ohio
- Counties: Fayette

Highway system
- Ohio State Highway System; Interstate; US; State; Scenic
← SR 430	→ SR 440

State Route 435 (SR 435, OH 435) is a 4.084-mile (6.573 km) long east–west state highway in the southwestern portion of the U.S. state of Ohio. The western terminus of SR 435 is at a partial interchange with U.S. Route 35 (US 35) approximately 5.50 miles (8.85 km) southwest of Jeffersonville, and its eastern terminus is a T-intersection with SR 729 nearly 2 miles (3.2 km) northeast of Milledgeville.

This route follows a former alignment of US 35, which now bypasses this area along a freeway alignment. SR 435 provides access between current U.S. Route 35 and Interstate 71 (I-71), as no direct interchange exists between the two highways.

== Route description ==
Traffic volume on State Route 435
County Log Point	Volume
0.5	3,300
0.8	4,270
1.404	9,800
1.65	16,380
1.787	13,500
2.0	6,390
2.562	1,640
2.922	1,440
Volume: AADT; Source:

The entirety of SR 435 is nestled within the northwestern quadrant of Fayette County. This highway is not included as a part of the National Highway System (NHS). The NHS is a network of routes identified as being most important for the economy, mobility and defense of the nation.

SR 435 starts at an incomplete directional T interchange with the US 35 freeway, and passes through farmland. The route moves southeast and meets the old routing of US 35. SR 435 crosses beneath I-71 at a diamond interchange, between West Lancaster Road and Allen Road. The route intersects Factory Shops Boulevard, which leads to a shopping center. Then, SR 435 passes over US 35, and soon becomes concurrent with SR 729 at a roundabout (which also serves Bluegrass Boulevard). Just over a mile (1.6 km) later, the concurrency ends, and SR 435 ends at SR 729, which turns north.

== History ==
US 35 between Xenia and Washington Court House was moved onto a new freeway alignment in 2003. Consequently, the majority of the former two-lane routing was removed from the state highway system. However, the re-routing resulted in there being no direct connection between US 35 and I-71 at Octa. To alleviate this, a new connector was built between the freeway just northwest of I-71 and the former routing of US 35. From this point to the easternmost point of the SR 729 overlap of the previous routing of US 35, the old routing of US 35 was kept in the state highway system. The connector, along with this portion of former US 35, was assigned the SR 435 designation. This allowed for not only a connection between I-71 and the new US 35 freeway, but also SR 729 and the freeway.

=== Northeast Ohio former plans ===
SR 435 was once a proposed limited-access north–south highway in Portage County and Stark County, as a result of a regional planning report. Connections in Portage would have been at SR 14, SR 59, SR 261, I-76 and US 224. Connections in Stark would have been at SR 619, State Street NE, SR 173, US 62, SR 153, SR 172, US 30 and would have terminated at SR 183 in Sandy. Designed to relieve traffic from SR 43 and SR 44, its centerline was 1-mile (1.6 km) east of State Route 43. However, the plan was never implemented beyond the planning stages. Instead, the city of Kent and Brimfield Township expanded SR 43 from two lanes to four to provide better access to I-76.

== Major intersections ==
The entire route is in Fayette County.

Location	mi	km	Destinations	Notes
Jefferson Township	0.00	0.00	US 35 west – Xenia	Partial interchange; access provided from US 35 eastbound to SR 435 eastbound and from SR 435 westbound to US 35 westbound only; US 35 exit 70
Octa	1.534– 1.679	2.469– 2.702	I-71 – Columbus, Cincinnati	I-71 exit 65
Jefferson Township	2.175– 2.448	3.500– 3.940	US 35 east – Washington Court House	Partial interchange; access provided from SR 435 to US 35 eastbound and from US 35 westbound to SR 435 only; US 35 exit 72
Jasper Township	2.913	4.688	SR 729 south – Milledgeville	Western end of SR 729 concurrency; roundabout
Jasper Township	4.084	6.573	SR 729 north / CR 35A east (Old US 35) to US 35 west – Jeffersonville, Washington Court House	Eastern end of SR 729 concurrency
1.000 mi = 1.609 km; 1.000 km = 0.621 mi: Concurrency terminus; Incomplete access
