= Interstate 71 =

Interstate Highway in Ohio and Kentucky

Interstate 71
- I-71 highlighted in red

Route information
- Maintained by KYTC and ODOT
- Length: 345.57 mi (556.14 km)
- Existed: August 14, 1957–present
- NHS: Entire route
- Restrictions: No hazmats or explosives allowed in the Lytle Tunnel, on the Brent Spence Bridge, or (for thru traffic only) inside the Columbus Outerbelt

Major junctions
- South end: I-64 / I-65 in Louisville, KY
- I-75 from Walton, KY to Cincinnati, OH; US 35 / SR 435 in Jeffersonville, OH; I-70 / SR 315 in Columbus, OH; US 30 in Mansfield, OH; I-76 / US 224 in Seville, OH; SR 18 in Medina, OH; I-271 near Medina, OH; I-80 Toll / Ohio Turnpike in Strongsville, OH; I-480 / SR 237 in Brook Park, OH
- North end: I-90 / I-490 in Cleveland, OH

Location
- Country: United States
- States: Kentucky, Ohio
- Counties: KY: Jefferson, Oldham, Henry, Trimble, Carroll, Gallatin, Boone, Kenton; OH: Hamilton, Warren, Clinton, Greene, Fayette, Madison, Pickaway, Franklin, Delaware, Morrow, Richland, Ashland, Wayne, Medina, Cuyahoga

Highway system
- Interstate Highway System; Main; Auxiliary; Suffixed; Business; Future
- Kentucky State Highway System; Interstate; US; State; Parkways
- Ohio State Highway System; Interstate; US; State; Scenic
← KY 70	KY	→ KY 72
← SR 70	OH	→ SR 71

Interstate 71 (I-71) is a north–south Interstate Highway in the midwestern and southeastern regions of the United States. Its southern terminus is at an interchange with I-64 and I-65 (the Kennedy Interchange) in Louisville, Kentucky, and its northern terminus at an interchange with I-90 in Cleveland, Ohio. I-71 runs concurrently with I-75 from a point about 20 miles (32 km) south of Cincinnati, Ohio, into Downtown Cincinnati. While most odd numbered Interstates run north–south, I-71 takes more of a northeast–southwest course, with some east–west sections, and is mainly a regional route serving Kentucky and Ohio. It links I-80 and I-90 to I-70. Major metropolitan areas served by I-71 include Louisville, Cincinnati, Columbus, and Cleveland.

Approximately three-quarters of the route lies east of I-75, leaving I-71 out of place in the Interstate grid.

== Route description ==
Lengths
	mi	km
KY	97.42	156.78
OH	248.15	399.36
Total	345.57	556.14

=== Kentucky ===
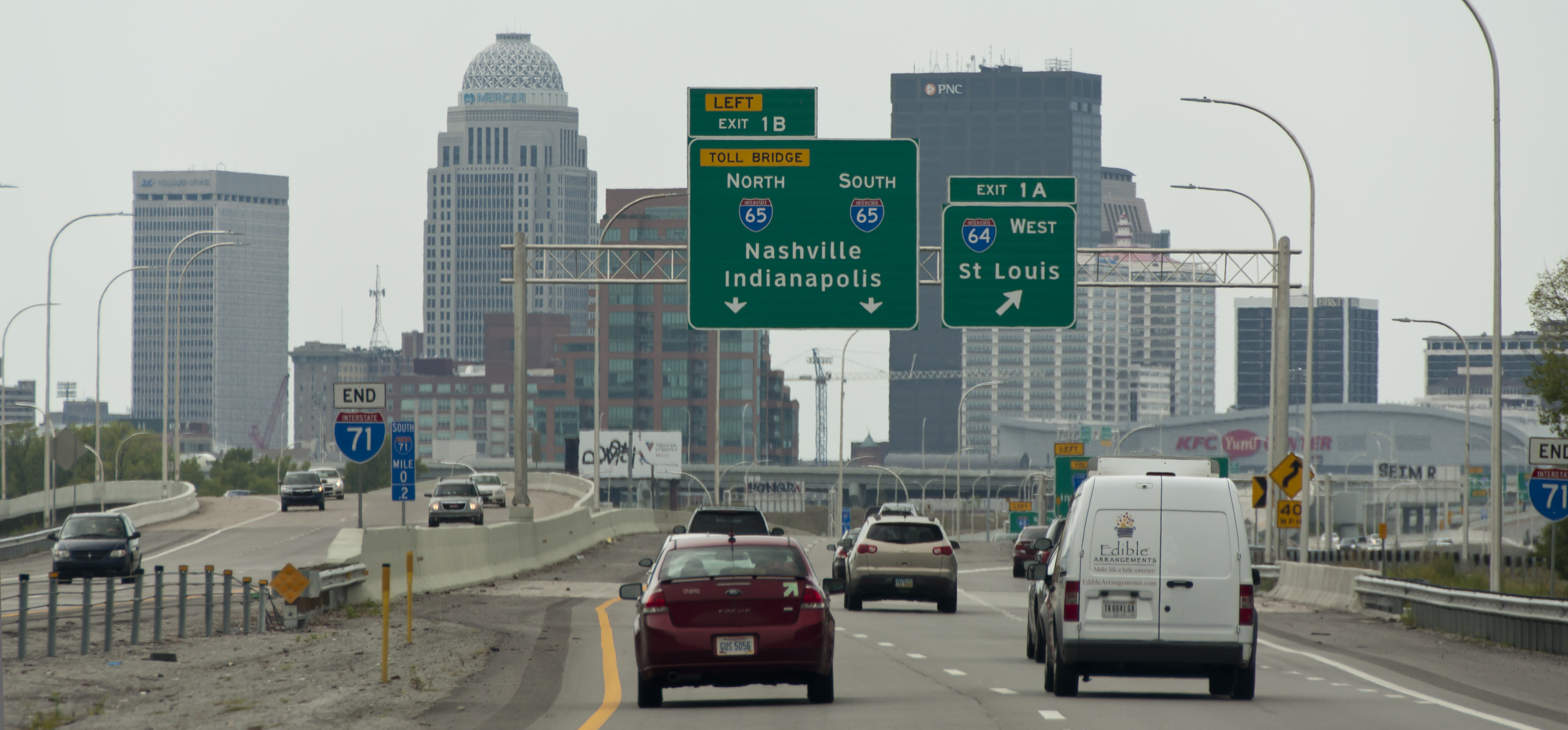
Southern end of I-71 in Downtown Louisville, Kentucky

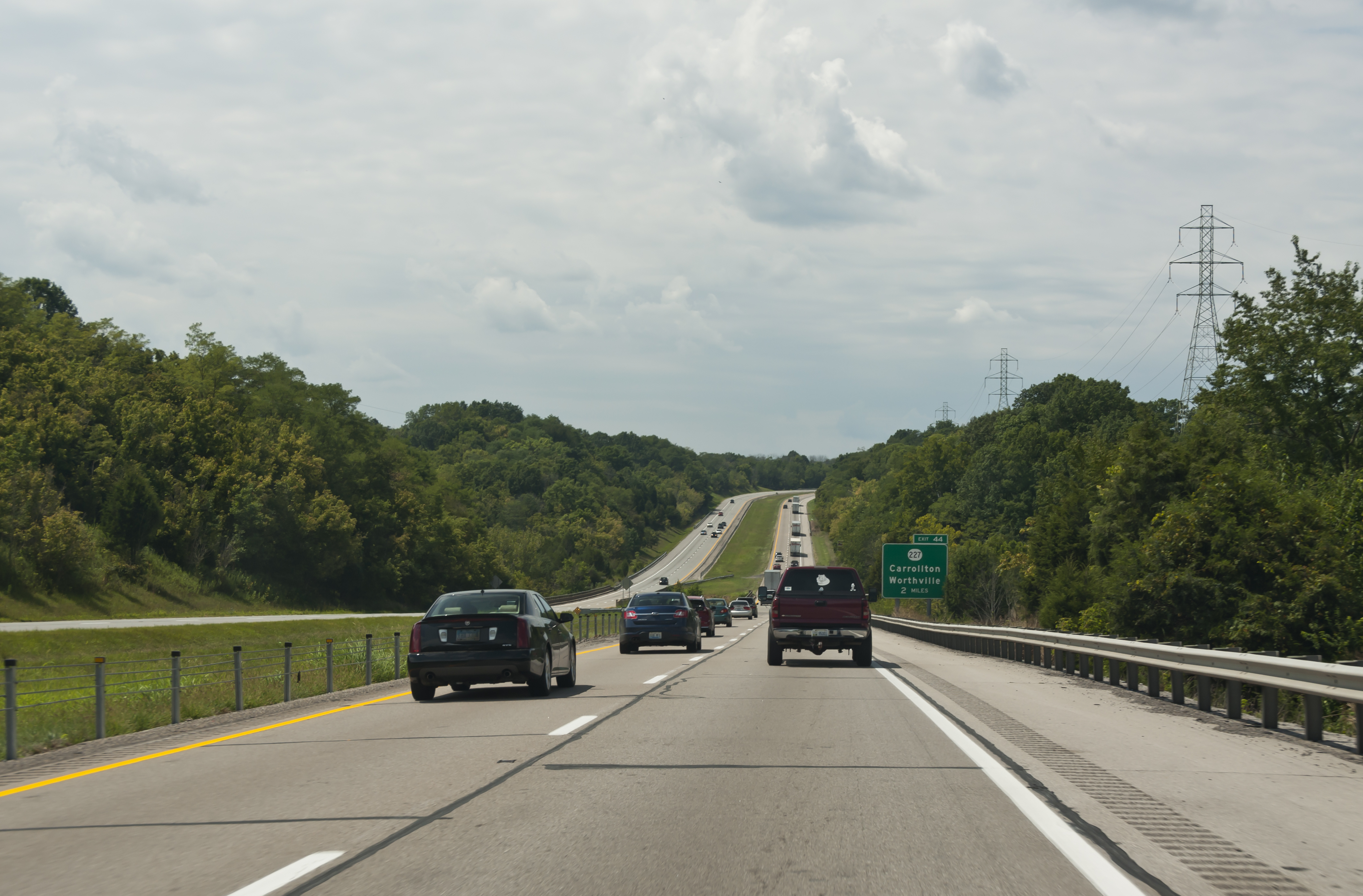
I-71 in Carroll County, Kentucky

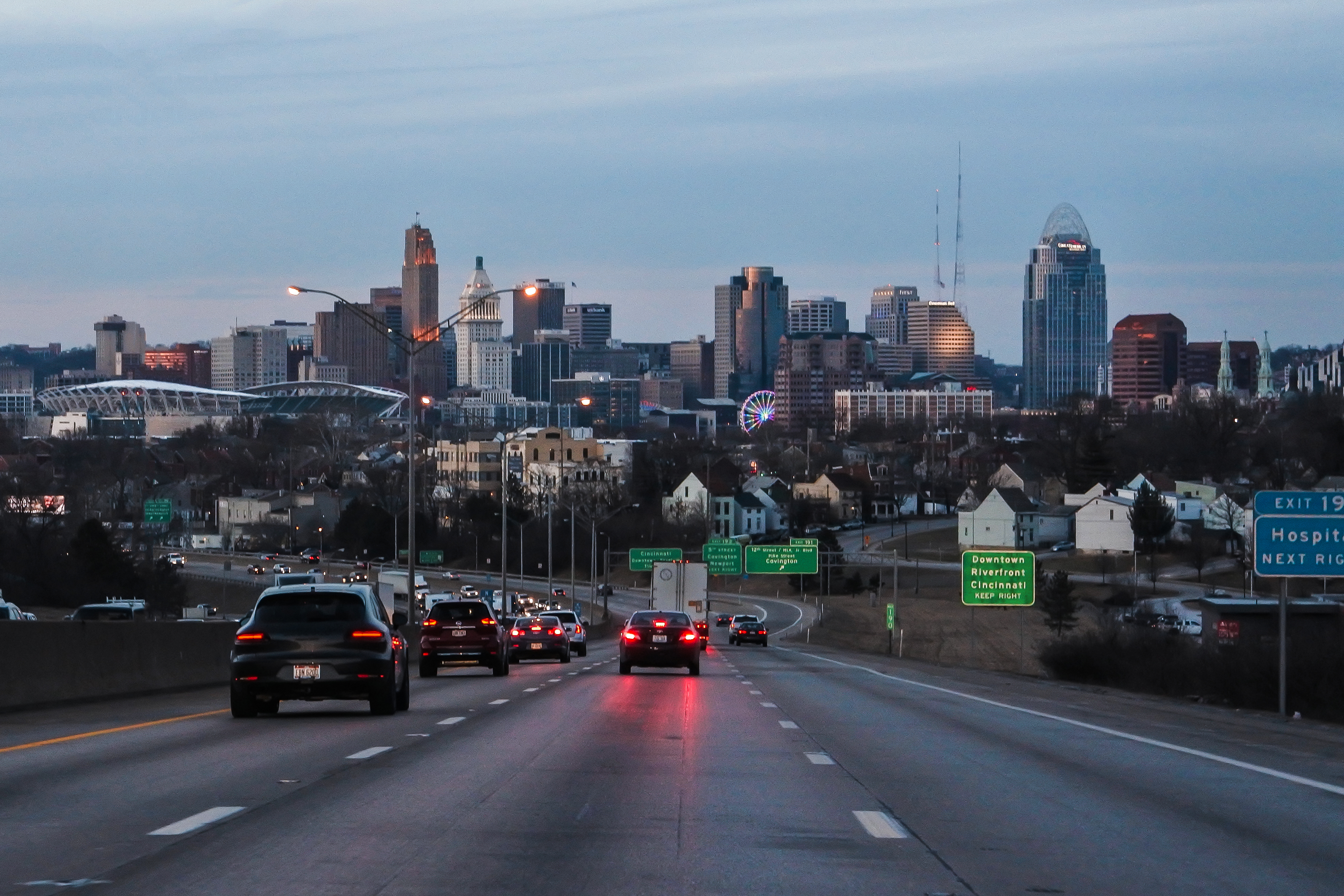
I-71 (and I-75) heading northbound into Cincinnati, Ohio, from Kentucky

In Kentucky, I-71 begins east of Downtown Louisville at the Kennedy Interchange, where it meets I-64 and I-65. This interchange is sometimes called the "Spaghetti Junction". From Louisville, it roughly follows the Ohio River in a diagonal path toward Northern Kentucky. Between Louisville and Cincinnati, I-71 is largely a four-lane highway, except for the approach to Kentucky Speedway in Sparta in which it runs three lanes each way for about two miles (3.2 km).

Near the town of Carrollton, there are signs marking the location of a tragic accident that occurred on May 14, 1988, when a drunk driver was driving north in the southbound lanes and struck a church bus full of children and teenagers, causing the bus's fuel tank to ignite into flames and killing 27 people on board. It is one of the worst bus accidents in state and national history.

After having run 77 miles (124 km) from Louisville, I-71 merges with I-75 near Walton after which it intersects I-275, the Cincinnati beltway. After passing through Covington, the freeway crosses the Ohio River via the lower level of the Brent Spence Bridge (while the southbound direction uses the upper level) and continues into Cincinnati.

=== Ohio ===
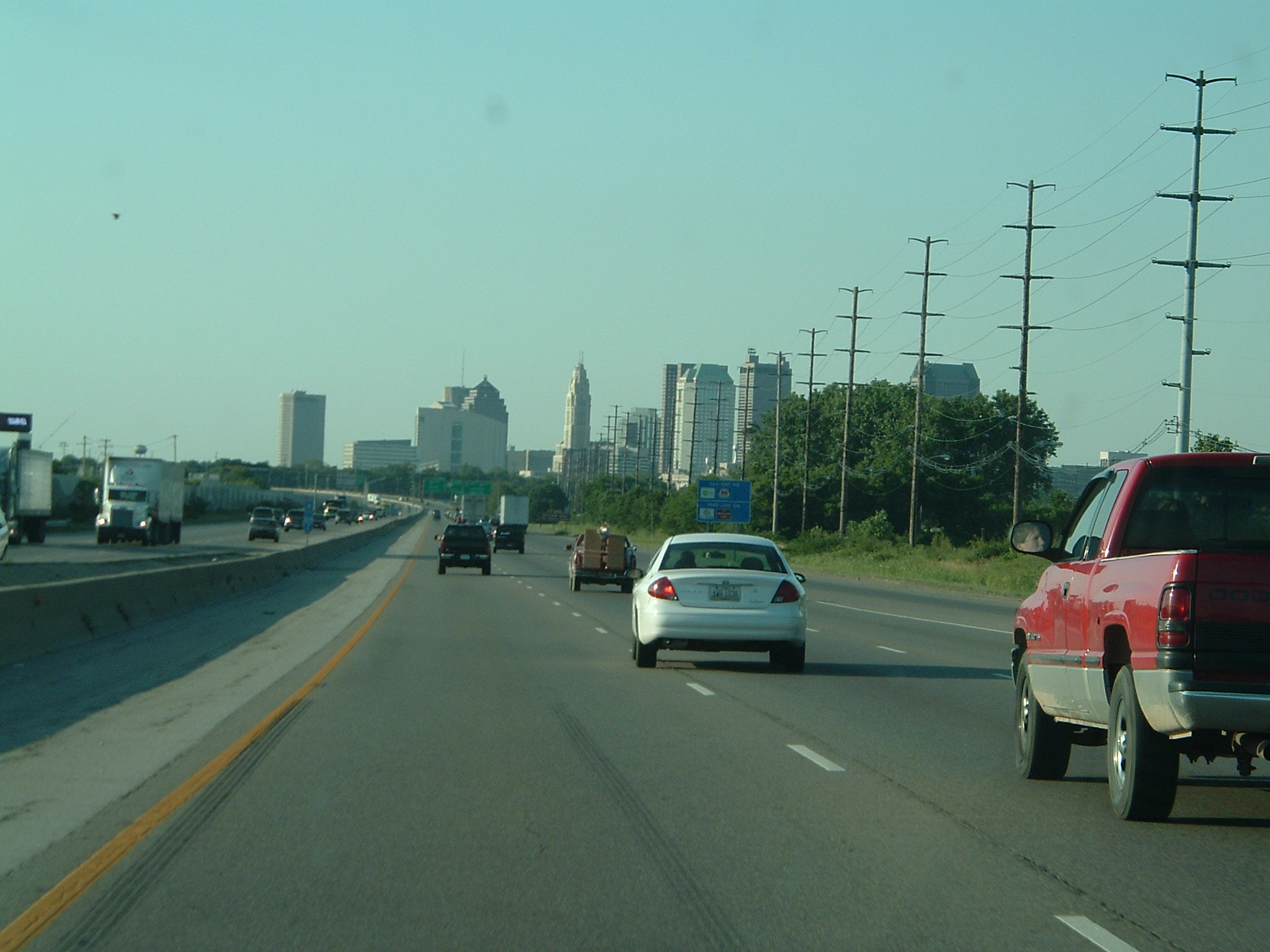
Heading northbound into Columbus, Ohio

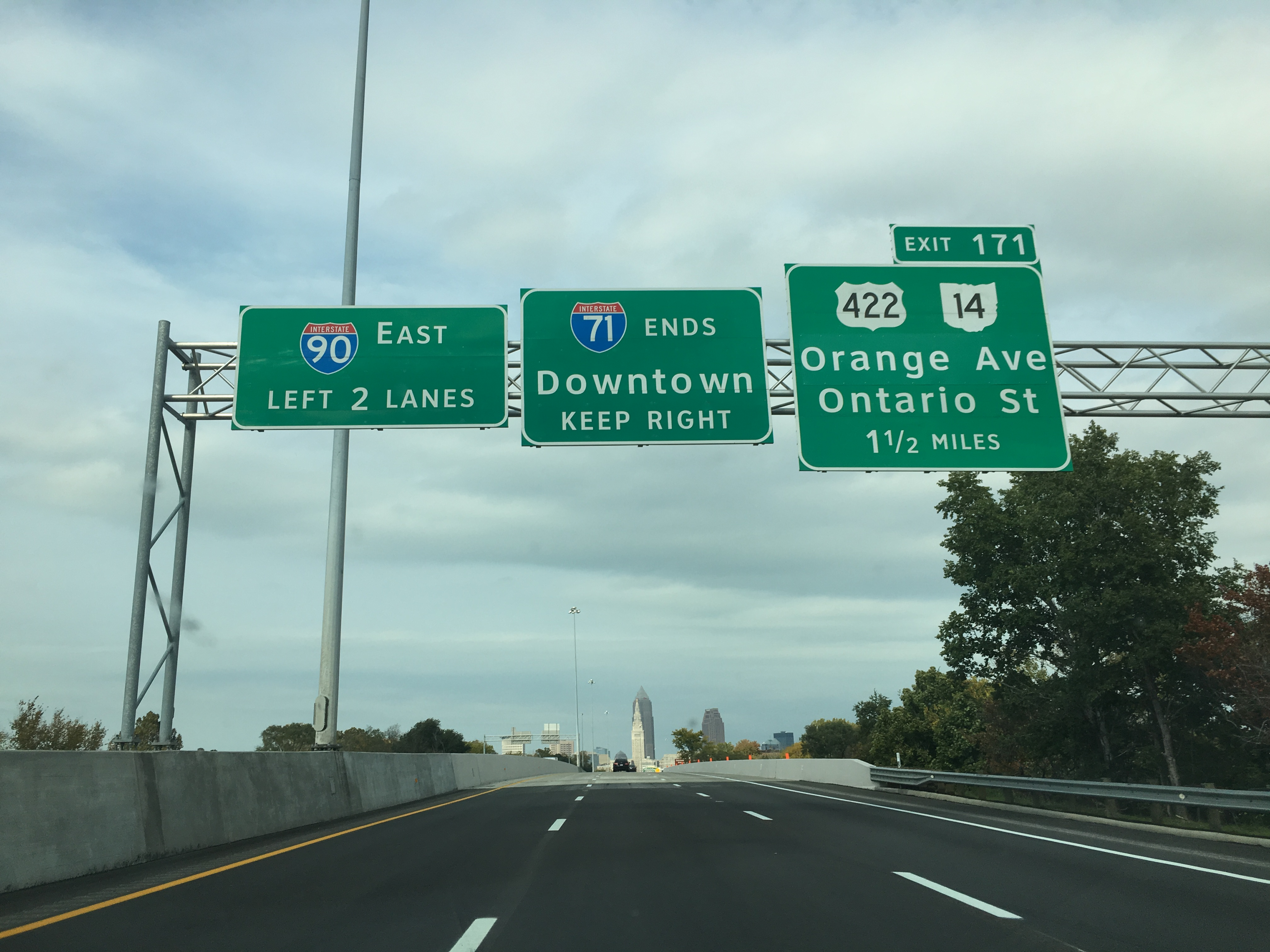
Northern terminus at I-90 in Downtown Cleveland, Ohio

In Cincinnati, it splits immediately from I-75 and heads due east onto Fort Washington Way, where it continues through Downtown Cincinnati concurrently with U.S. Route 50 (US 50) for less than one mile (1.6 km). Just east of downtown, US 50 splits from I-71 and continues east; I-71 bends north and receives I-471, a spur from southeast of the city. I-71 then heads in a general northeast direction through the Lytle Tunnel and urban Cincinnati and into its surrounding suburbs. After another interchange with the I-275 beltway, the freeway leaves the metropolitan area and heads toward Columbus. It continues northeast until it reaches South Lebanon, where it begins cutting east across the flat plains of southwest Ohio. The freeway crosses the Little Miami River on the Jeremiah Morrow Bridge, which is a concrete box girder bridge and the tallest bridge in Ohio, at 239 feet (73 m) above the river. I-71 heads toward Columbus then intersects with the bypass I-270 before heading north into urban Columbus, where it intersects with I-70. About a mile (1.6 km) north of the I-70 junction, it intersects with I-670. After another interchange with the I-270 bypass, the highway exits Columbus and continues north until near Delaware, where it again turns northeast. Beginning its path to Cleveland, I-71 enters the rolling farm country on the edges of the Allegheny Plateau. It continues in this fashion to Lodi–Westfield Center and its junction with I-76, which provides access to Akron and points east. Heading north to Medina, it meets the terminus of I-271. The highway then continues north into urban Cuyahoga County and Cleveland's suburbs, intersecting the Ohio Turnpike/I-80. Passing Cleveland Hopkins International Airport, I-71 meets I-480 and enters Cleveland's west side, continuing on to downtown. It junctions with State Route 176 (SR 176) and terminates at I-90 on the Innerbelt.

== History ==
=== Kentucky ===
The first section of I-71 in Louisville opened in December 1966 between its terminus at Spaghetti Junction and Zorn Avenue, its first exit. Its junction with I-264 opened in July 1968, and the complete Kentucky portion of the Interstate was opened to the public in July 1969. At that point, it replaced US 42 as the primary link between Cincinnati and Louisville.

=== Ohio ===
Much of I-71 in Ohio was intended to be SR 1. SR 1 was originally planned in the 1950s as a second Ohio Turnpike extending southwest to northeast across the state. It was planned to run from Cincinnati to Conneaut and connect with an extension built across the Erie Triangle to the New York State Thruway. As the highway was being planned, the Federal-Aid Highway Act of 1956 was enacted, and the project was converted from a toll road to a freeway. It was designated as SR 1, since the Interstate Highway numbering system had not yet been implemented. Portions of the freeway began to be completed and opened in 1959 with the new Interstate Highway funding, and they were marked as SR 1 as well as with their new Interstate Highway number. Since large gaps existed along the corridor where no freeway had yet been completed, existing two-lane or four-lane highways were also designated as SR 1 in order to complete the route. The SR 1 signage was removed in 1966 as the Interstate Highway numbers adequately marked the route by then and the state highway numbering was superfluous.

In Columbus, the portion of I-71 that bounds Worthington's eastern edge was originally called the North Freeway. Costing $13.8 million (equivalent to $109 million in 2024), it was constructed south from SR 161, arriving at 11th Avenue by August 1961. It took another year to construct the portion between 11th and 5th avenues, mainly due to the need to construct a massive underpass under the Pennsylvania Railroad's Grogan Yard. Today, only two tracks cross the viaduct, and the rest of the structure supports a large, weedy field. By August 1962, the freeway had reached Fifth Avenue, and it reached downtown in November 1962.

I-71 was originally planned to follow the Innerbelt Freeway northward from its current northern terminus to the Cleveland Memorial Shoreway at Dead Man's Curve when I-90 was planned to continue westward from there along the Shoreway.

Upon its completion, I-71 replaced SR 3 as the primary highway link between Cincinnati, Columbus, and Cleveland.

For more than 30 years as of 2025, there has been discussion about building an interchange at Boston Road on the border of Brunswick in Medina County and Strongsville in Cuyahoga County between the SR 303 and SR 82 interchanges. A 2026 study recommended not building one there but instead suggested nearby modifications.

Between 2004 and 2006, the interchange at milepost 121 in the far northern reaches of Columbus was reconstructed to allow access to the eastern extension of Gemini Place. Before that, it was a simple diamond interchange with SR 750 (Polaris Parkway).

In 2022, construction began to convert southbound I-71 to a flyover ramp in Columbus. The ramp, which carries traffic from southbound I-71 over westbound I-70, was opened to the public on December 20, 2025.

==== Rebuilding and widening program ====
In 1999, the state of Ohio began a 10-year, $500-million (equivalent to $883 million in 2024) project to improve I-71 between Columbus and Cleveland. The plans did not include widening the 25-mile (40 km) stretch in Delaware and Morrow counties, calling for patching that section instead. At that time, state transportation officials said they did not plan to widen that section for two reasons: traffic studies did not support the widening and there was no money for the project. But Ohio Department of Transportation (ODOT) officials eventually gave in under pressure from elected officials and business owners to widen the remaining 25-mile (40 km) stretch of I-71 from just north of the US 36/SR 37 interchange in Delaware County to the Morrow–Richland county line. The reconstruction and widening on the last 25-mile (40 km) stretch of I-71 in Delaware and Morrow counties began in early 2012, and the work was completed in mid-2015 at a cost of $144 million (equivalent to $186 million in 2024).

== Exit list ==
State	County	Location	mi	km	Exit	Destinations	Notes
Kentucky	Jefferson	Louisville	0.000	0.000		I-65 south – Nashville	Southern terminus; I-65 exit 137
Kentucky	Jefferson	Louisville	0.000	0.000	136C	Jefferson Street – Downtown	Southbound exit and northbound entrance; exit number follows I-65
Kentucky	Jefferson	Louisville	0.000	0.000	1	I-65 Toll north (Abraham Lincoln Bridge) – Indianapolis I-64 west – St. Louis	Signed as exits 1A (I-64) and 1B (I-65) southbound; no exit numbers northbound; I-64 exit 6; I-65 exit 137
Kentucky	Jefferson	Louisville	0.000	0.000	—	I-64 east – Lexington	Northbound exit and southbound entrance; I-64 exit 5A
Kentucky	Jefferson	Louisville	1.724	2.775	2	Zorn Avenue	
Kentucky	Jefferson	Louisville	4.966	7.992	5	I-264 (Watterson Expressway)	I-264 exit 23
Kentucky	Jefferson	Louisville	9.063	14.585	9	I-265 to US 42 (Gene Snyder Freeway)	Signed as exits 9A (south) and 9B (north); I-265 exit 24
Kentucky	Oldham		14.488	23.316	14	KY 329 – Crestwood, Pewee Valley	
Kentucky	Oldham		17.478	28.128	17	KY 146 – Buckner, Crestwood, Pewee Valley	
Kentucky	Oldham		18.507	29.784	18	KY 393 – Buckner	
Kentucky	Oldham	La Grange	20.6	33.2	21	KY 2857 – La Grange	Under construction; planned completion in 2024.
Kentucky	Oldham	La Grange	21.869	35.195	22	KY 53 – La Grange, Ballardsville	
Kentucky	Henry	Pendleton	27.840	44.804	28	KY 153 to KY 146 – Sligo, New Castle	
Kentucky	Henry	Campbellsburg	33.505	53.921	34	US 421 – Campbellsburg, New Castle, Bedford	
Kentucky	Trimble	No major junctions					
Kentucky	Carroll		42.802	68.883	43	KY 389 to KY 55 – Prestonville, English	
Kentucky	Carroll		44.312	71.313	44	KY 227 – Worthville, Carrollton	
Kentucky	Gallatin		54.980	88.482	55	KY 1039 to KY 465 – Vevay	Serves Kentucky Speedway
Kentucky	Gallatin		56.673	91.206	57	KY 35 – Sparta, Warsaw	Serves Kentucky Speedway
Kentucky	Gallatin	Glencoe	61.774	99.416	62	US 127 – Glencoe, Owenton	
Kentucky	Boone		72.195	116.187	72	KY 14 – Verona	
Kentucky	Boone		77.724	125.085	77	I-75 south – Lexington	Southern end of I-75 overlap; exit numbers switch to follow I-75's mileposts, I-75 exit 173
Kentucky	Boone		79.556	128.033	175	KY 338 – Richwood	
Kentucky	Boone	Florence	82.275	132.409	178	KY 536 (Mt. Zion Road)	
Kentucky	Boone	Florence	84.298	135.664	180	US 42 / US 127 – Union, Florence	
Kentucky	Boone	Florence	84.694	136.302	180A	Mall Road	Southbound exit and northbound entrance; serves Florence Mall; former KY 3157
Kentucky	Boone	Florence	85.449	137.517	181	KY 18 – Florence, Burlington	
Kentucky	Boone	Florence	86.652	139.453	182	KY 1017 (Turfway Road)	
Kentucky	Kenton	Erlanger	87.967	141.569	184	KY 236 – Erlanger	Signed as exits 184A (east) and 184B (west) southbound
Kentucky	Kenton	Erlanger	88.900	143.071	185	I-275 to I-471 – Cincinnati/Northern Kentucky International Airport	I-275 exit 84
Kentucky	Kenton	Fort Mitchell	90.539	145.708	186	KY 371 (Buttermilk Pike)	
Kentucky	Kenton	Fort Mitchell	91.913	147.920	188	US 25 / US 42 / US 127 (Dixie Highway) – Fort Mitchell	
Kentucky	Kenton	Fort Wright	92.870	149.460	189	KY 1072 (Kyles Lane) – Fort Wright, Park Hills	
Kentucky	Kenton	Covington	94.707– 94.858	152.416– 152.659	191	12th Street (KY 1120), Pike Street (US 25 / US 42 / US 127) – Covington	
Kentucky	Kenton	Covington	95.414– 95.507	153.554– 153.704	192	5th Street (KY 8) – Covington, Newport	
Ohio River			97.42 0.00	156.78 0.00	Brent Spence Bridge; Kentucky–Ohio line		
Ohio	Hamilton	Cincinnati	0.22– 0.50	0.35– 0.80	—	I-75 north / US 50 west – Dayton	Northern end of I-75 overlap; southern end of US 50 overlap
Ohio	Hamilton	Cincinnati			1B	Second Street – Downtown, Riverfront	Exit unnumbered until 2018
Ohio	Hamilton	Cincinnati	1.11	1.79	—	US 50 east (Columbia Parkway) to I-471 / US 52	Northern end of US 50 overlap; northbound exit and southbound entrance
Ohio	Hamilton	Cincinnati			Lytle Tunnel; Sharp turn (40 mph or 64 km/h) in both directions		
Ohio	Hamilton	Cincinnati	1.99	3.20	1A	I-471 south – Newport	Southbound exit and northbound entrance; exit unnumbered until 2018
Ohio	Hamilton	Cincinnati	2.33– 2.48	3.75– 3.99	2	US 42 (Reading Road) / Eden Park Drive / Gilbert Avenue (US 22 / SR 3) / Eighth Street – Ballpark, Stadium/Arena	Split into exit 2A (US 42) and 2B (Gilbert/8th) southbound; Gilbert Ave./8th St. not signed northbound, Eden Park Dr. not signed southbound
Ohio	Hamilton	Cincinnati	3.33– 4.3	5.36– 6.9		McMillan Street	Northbound entrance only
Ohio	Hamilton	Cincinnati	3.33– 4.3	5.36– 6.9	3A	William Howard Taft Road	Southbound exit only
Ohio	Hamilton	Cincinnati	3.33– 4.3	5.36– 6.9	3B	Martin Luther King Drive – Level I Trauma Center	Signed as exit 3 northbound
Ohio	Hamilton	Cincinnati	4.46– 6.03	7.18– 9.70	5	Dana Avenue / Montgomery Road (US 22 / SR 3)	
Ohio	Hamilton	Norwood	6.75– 6.96	10.86– 11.20	6	SR 561 (Smith Road / Edwards Road)	
Ohio	Hamilton	Cincinnati	8.04	12.94	8A	Ridge Avenue	Northbound exit and southbound entrance
Ohio	Hamilton	Cincinnati	8.04	12.94	8B	SR 562 – Norwood	Signed as exit 7 southbound
Ohio	Hamilton	Columbia Township	8.51	13.70	8C	Kennedy Avenue	Northbound exit and southbound entrance
Ohio	Hamilton	Columbia Township	8.75	14.08	8	Kennedy Avenue, Ridge Avenue	Southbound exit and northbound entrance
Ohio	Hamilton	Columbia Township	9.91– 9.92	15.95– 15.96	9	Red Bank Road – Fairfax	
Ohio	Hamilton	Silverton	10.68	17.19	10	Stewart Road	Northbound exit and southbound entrance
Ohio	Hamilton	Sycamore Township	11.81	19.01	11	Kenwood Road	Northbound exit and southbound entrance
Ohio	Hamilton	Sycamore Township	12.44	20.02	12	US 22 / SR 3 (Montgomery Road)	
Ohio	Hamilton	Montgomery	14.13	22.74	14	SR 126 (Ronald Reagan Cross County Highway)	
Ohio	Hamilton	Montgomery	15.80	25.43	15	Pfeiffer Road	
Ohio	Hamilton	Montgomery	17.51– 17.54	28.18– 28.23	17	I-275 to SR 32 / I-75	I-275 exit 49; signed as exits 17A (east) & 17B (west) southbound
Ohio	Hamilton–Warren county line	Symmes–Deerfield township line	19.88– 19.97	31.99– 32.14	19	Mason Montgomery Road / Fields Ertel Road	
Ohio	Warren	Mason	23.53	37.87	24	Western Row Road / Kings Island Drive / Innovation Way – Kings Island	Signed as Western Row Road and Kings Island Drive northbound and Western Row Road and Innovation Way southbound; originally constructed as northbound exit and southbound entrance only but expanded to a full interchange in 2019
Ohio	Warren	Mason	25.30	40.72	25	SR 741 north (Kings Mills Road) – Mason, Kings Mills, Kings Island	
Ohio	Warren	Lebanon–South Lebanon city line	28.33	45.59	28	SR 48 – South Lebanon, Lebanon	
Ohio	Warren	Turtlecreek Township	32.56	52.40	32	SR 123 – Morrow, Lebanon	
Ohio	Warren	Washington Township	36.74	59.13	36	Wilmington Road	
Ohio	Clinton	Chester Township	45.11	72.60	45	SR 73 – Waynesville, Wilmington	
Ohio	Clinton	Liberty Township	50.74– 50.75	81.66– 81.67	50	US 68 – Xenia, Wilmington	
Ohio	Greene	Jefferson Township	58.01	93.36	58	SR 72 – Sabina, Jamestown	
Ohio	Fayette	Octa	65.33	105.14	65	US 35 (SR 435) – Xenia, Washington Court House	
Ohio	Fayette	Jeffersonville	69.49	111.83	69	SR 41 / SR 734 – South Solon, Jeffersonville, Washington Court House	
Ohio	Fayette	Paint Township	75.03	120.75	75	SR 38 – Bloomingburg, Midway	
Ohio	Madison	Pleasant Township	84.27	135.62	84	SR 56 – Mount Sterling, London	
Ohio	Pickaway	No major junctions					
Ohio	Franklin	Pleasant Township	94.15	151.52	94	US 62 / SR 3 – Grove City, Orient, Harrisburg	
Ohio	Franklin	Jackson Township	97.16	156.36	97	SR 665 (London-Groveport Road)	Interchange fully opened August 17, 2012
Ohio	Franklin	Grove City	98.85	159.08	99	Hoover Road – Grove City	Proposed
Ohio	Franklin	Grove City	100.60	161.90	100	Stringtown Road – Grove City	
Ohio	Franklin	Jackson Township	101.68	163.64	101	I-270 – Dayton, Wheeling	Signed northbound as exit 100, southbound as exit 101; I-270 exit 55
Ohio	Franklin	Columbus	103.86	167.15	104	SR 104 / Frank Road	
Ohio	Franklin	Columbus	105.43	169.67	105	Greenlawn Avenue	
Ohio	Franklin	Columbus	106.33	171.12	106A	I-70 west – Dayton	Northbound exit and southbound entrance; I-70 exit 99A
Ohio	Franklin	Columbus	106.33	171.12	106B	SR 315 north – Worthington	No exit number southbound; I-70 exit 99B
Ohio	Franklin	Columbus	106.33	171.12	—	I-70 west – Dayton	Southern end of I-70 overlap; southbound exit and northbound entrance; I-70 exit 99A; exit numbers switch to follow I-70's mileposts
Ohio	Franklin	Columbus			100	US 23 (Third Street / Fourth Street) / Fulton Street	New interchange that replaces exits 100A-B; has no southbound exit
Ohio	Franklin	Columbus	107.07– 107.17	172.31– 172.47	100A	US 23 south (High Street) / Front Street	Closed after opening of new exit 100; had no northbound entrance; southbound exit was via exit 100B
Ohio	Franklin	Columbus	107.41	172.86	100B	US 23 north (Fourth Street) / Livingston Avenue (US 33)	Closed after opening of new exit 100
Ohio	Franklin	Columbus	107.90– 108.10	173.65– 173.97	101B	Parsons Avenue	Northbound exit only
Ohio	Franklin	Columbus	107.90– 108.10	173.65– 173.97	107	I-70 east – Wheeling	Northern end of I-70 overlap; I-70 exit 101A ; left exit southbound
Ohio	Franklin	Columbus	108.20	174.13	108A	Main Street	No northbound exit
Ohio	Franklin	Columbus	108.63	174.82	108B	US 40 (Broad Street)	Southbound entrance and northbound exit
Ohio	Franklin	Columbus	109.16	175.68	109A	I-670 – Airport, Indianapolis	Northbound exit and southbound entrance; I-670 exit 5; northbound off-ramp to I-670 east includes direct ramp onto Leonard Avenue
Ohio	Franklin	Columbus	108.93	175.31	109B	Spring Street – Downtown	Southbound exit and northbound entrance
Ohio	Franklin	Columbus	109.61	176.40	109A	I-670 – Airport, Indianapolis	Southbound exit and northbound entrance; I-670 exit 5
Ohio	Franklin	Columbus	110.16	177.29	110A	Fifth Avenue	No northbound exit
Ohio	Franklin	Columbus	110.68	178.12	110B	11th Avenue	Access to Linden Primary Care Center
Ohio	Franklin	Columbus	111.15	178.88	111	17th Avenue	Access to the Ohio State Fairgrounds & Expo Center and Ohio History Center
Ohio	Franklin	Columbus	112.33	180.78	112	Hudson Street	
Ohio	Franklin	Columbus	112.98	181.82	113	Weber Road	
Ohio	Franklin	Columbus	113.46	182.60	114	North Broadway	Access to Riverside Methodist Hospital
Ohio	Franklin	Columbus	114.53	184.32	115	Cooke Road (Indianola Avenue)	
Ohio	Franklin	Columbus	115.58	186.01	116	Morse Road / Sinclair Road	
Ohio	Franklin	Columbus	117.53	189.15	117	SR 161 (Dublin-Granville Road)	
Ohio	Franklin	Columbus	119.21– 119.23	191.85– 191.88	119	I-270 – Dayton, Wheeling	Signed as exits 119A (east) and 119B (west) southbound; I-270 exit 26
Ohio	Franklin–Delaware county line	Columbus	121.45– 121.92	195.45– 196.21	121	SR 750 west (Polaris Parkway) / Gemini Place / Ikea Way	Eastern terminus of SR 750; access to Polaris Shopping Center
Ohio	Delaware	Orange Township	124	200	124	Big Walnut Road	Future interchange
Ohio	Delaware	Berkshire Township			129	Sunbury Parkway	Future interchange
Ohio	Delaware	Berkshire Township	130.64	210.24	131	US 36 / SR 37 – Delaware, Sunbury	
Ohio	Morrow	Bennington Township	140.15	225.55	140	SR 61 – Sunbury, Mount Gilead, Galion	
Ohio	Morrow	Chester–Franklin township line	151.09	243.16	151	SR 95 – Fredericktown, Mount Gilead	
Ohio	Richland	Washington Township–Bellville village line	165.25	265.94	165	SR 97 – Lexington, Bellville	
Ohio	Richland	Washington Township–Mansfield city line	168.81	271.67	169	SR 13 – Mansfield, Bellville	
Ohio	Richland	Madison Township	172.97	278.37	173	SR 39 – Mansfield, Lucas	
Ohio	Richland	Mifflin Township	176.91	284.71	176	US 30 – Mansfield, Wooster	Indirect southbound access to eastbound US 30 and from westbound US 30 to northbound I-71 via Crider and Koogle roads
Ohio	Ashland	Montgomery Township	186.71	300.48	186	US 250 – Ashland, Wooster	
Ohio	Wayne	Congress Township	196.31	315.93	196	SR 301 – West Salem	Northbound exit and southbound entrance
Ohio	Wayne	Congress Township	197.92	318.52	198	SR 539 – West Salem, Congress	
Ohio	Medina	Harrisville Township	203.89	328.13	204	SR 83 – Lodi, Wooster	
Ohio	Medina	Westfield Township	209.51	337.17	209	I-76 / US 224 – Lodi, Akron	Signed as exits 209A (I-76/US 224 east) and 209B (US 224 west); western terminus of I-76 (Ohio), exit 1
Ohio	Medina	Medina Township	218.86	352.22	218	SR 18 – Akron, Medina	
Ohio	Medina	Medina Township	220.71	355.20	220	I-271 north – Erie	Northbound exit and southbound entrance
Ohio	Medina	Medina Township	222.91	358.74	222	SR 3 – Hinckley, Medina	
Ohio	Medina	Brunswick	226.03	363.76	226	SR 303 – Brunswick, Hinckley	
Ohio	Cuyahoga	Strongsville	231.26	372.18	231	SR 82 (Royalton Road) – Strongsville, North Royalton	Signed as exits 231A (east) and 231B (west) southbound
Ohio	Cuyahoga	Strongsville	233.06	375.07	233	I-80 / Ohio Turnpike – Toledo, Youngstown	I-80/Ohio Turnpike exit 161
Ohio	Cuyahoga	Middleburg Heights	234.21	376.92	234	US 42 – Strongsville, Parma Heights	
Ohio	Cuyahoga	Middleburg Heights	235.37	378.79	235	Bagley Road – Berea, Middleburg Heights	
Ohio	Cuyahoga	Brook Park	237.53	382.27	237	Snow Road / Engle Road – Airport	Signed as exits 237A (east) and 237B (west, Engle) southbound
Ohio	Cuyahoga	Brook Park–Cleveland line	238.77	384.26	238	I-480 – Toledo, Youngstown	Northbound exit and southbound entrance; I-480 exit 11
Ohio	Cuyahoga	Cleveland	239.26	385.05	239	SR 237 south – Airport, Berea	Southbound left exit and northbound left entrance
Ohio	Cuyahoga	Cleveland	240.57	387.16	240	W. 150th Street	
Ohio	Cuyahoga	Cleveland	241.85	389.22	242A	W. 130th Street	Signed as exit 242 southbound
Ohio	Cuyahoga	Cleveland–Linndale line	242.41	390.12	242B	Bellaire Road	Northbound exit and southbound entrance
Ohio	Cuyahoga	Cleveland	244.5	393.5	244	Denison Avenue / W. 65th Street	Northbound exit and southbound entrance
Ohio	Cuyahoga	Cleveland	245.48– 246.20	395.06– 396.22	245	US 42 (SR 3 / Pearl Road / W. 25th Street) / Fulton Road	
Ohio	Cuyahoga	Cleveland	246.6	396.9	246	SR 176 south – Parma	Southbound exit and northbound entrance
Ohio	Cuyahoga	Cleveland	246.98– 247.56	397.48– 398.41	247	I-90 west / I-490 east / W. 14th Street / Clark Avenue / Steelyard Drive – Toledo	Northbound exit and southbound entrance; I-90 exit 170B; I-490 exit 1A
Ohio	Cuyahoga	Cleveland	247.81– 248.15	398.81– 399.36		I-90 east – Cleveland	Northern terminus; I-90 exit 170B
1.000 mi = 1.609 km; 1.000 km = 0.621 mi: Concurrency terminus; Incomplete access; Tolled; Unopened

== Auxiliary routes ==
I-71 has two auxiliary routes in Greater Cleveland and the Cincinnati metropolitan area. I-471 links Downtown Cincinnati with I-275. I-271 provides access to Cleveland's eastern suburbs and enables travelers on I-71 to access I-90 east without going through Cleveland proper.

== See also ==
- Carrollton bus collision, a drunk-driving tragedy involving a school bus that occurred on I-71
- List of roads in Louisville, Kentucky
- Sports rivalries involving cities on I-71
  - Bengals–Browns rivalry: Cincinnati Bengals–Cleveland Browns (NFL)
  - Crosstown Shootout: Cincinnati Bearcats–Xavier Musketeers (college basketball)
  - The Keg of Nails: Cincinnati Bearcats–Louisville Cardinals (college football)
  - Ohio Cup: Cincinnati Reds–Cleveland Guardians (MLB)
  - Hell Is Real derby: Columbus Crew SC–FC Cincinnati (MLS)
  - Dirty River Derby: FC Cincinnati-Louisville City FC (soccer)
