= WZAA =

WZAA may refer to:

- WZAA-LP, a low-power radio station (106.9 FM) licensed to serve Jeffersonville, Ohio, United States
- WBQH, a radio station (1050 AM) licensed to serve Silver Spring, Maryland, United States, which held the call sign WZAA from 2009 to 2010
- WFME-FM, a radio station (92.7 FM) licensed to serve Garden City, New York, United States, which held the call sign WZAA from 2004 to 2007
