= Ohio State Route 40 =

State Route 40

Route information
- Maintained by ODOT

Location
- Country: United States
- State: Ohio

Highway system
- Ohio State Highway System; Interstate; US; State; Scenic
← US 40	→ SR 41

In Ohio, State Route 40 may refer to:

- U.S. Route 40 in Ohio, the only Ohio highway numbered 40 since 1927
- Ohio State Route 40 (1923-1927), now US 22 (Washington Court House to Zanesville)
