= Ohio State Route 734 =

East-west state highway in Ohio, US

State Route 734

Route information
- Maintained by ODOT
- Length: 16.57 mi (26.67 km)
- Existed: 1937–present

Major junctions
- West end: SR 72 in Jamestown
- I-71 in Jeffersonville
- East end: SR 38 near Bloomingburg

Location
- Country: United States
- State: Ohio
- Counties: Greene, Fayette

Highway system
- Ohio State Highway System; Interstate; US; State; Scenic
← SR 733	→ SR 735

State Route 734 (SR 734) is a state highway in Greene and Fayette Counties in central Ohio. The 16.57-mile-long (26.67 km) route runs from SR 72 in downtown Jamestown east to SR 38 near Jeffersonville and Bloomingburg.

== Route description ==
The state route begins at a signalized intersection in Jamestown where Washington Street and Limestone Street (SR 72) intersect. SR 734 heads east out of town and begins to climb a small hill. About halfway up the hill, the route makes a left turn, old US 35 continues straight. Passing through farmlands and small clusters of residences, the route passes over a freeway carrying US 35; no interchange is present at this overpass. After crossing into Fayette County, the route heads east through flat farmlands with occasional homes and bridges over small streams. Upon entering Jeffersonville, the route name carries High Street into the downtown area of the village. At an intersection with Main Street, SR 734 turns right and forms a concurrency with State Routes 41 and 729. Main Street, carrying the three routes, heads southeast, but the road curves to due east and becomes known as State Street. SR 729 breaks away and heads south at South Street but Routes 41 and 734 continue east towards the eastern extents of town. After having a grade crossing with an Indiana and Ohio Railway railroad, the routes pass two industrial facilities and some commercial businesses as they approach I-71's exit 69. The interchange with the Interstate highway is a simple diamond-interchange allowing for full-access between the surface roads and the freeway. Shortly after the interchange, SR 734 turns left off of SR 41 which continues south towards Washington Court House ending the concurrency. For the last segment of the route, the route travels through sparsely populated farmland and ends in rural Paint Township at SR 38.

== History ==
SR 734 was first designated in 1937 on an alignment between then-SR 70 (now SR 41) east of Jeffersonville and its present eastern terminus at SR 38. Within two years, the route was extended to the Jamestown area at US 35 and became fully asphalt-paved. The route would remain on this alignment until 2003 when it was extended over the former US 35 into downtown Jamestown when US 35 was routed on a nearby freeway the same year.

== Major junctions ==
County	Location	mi	km	Destinations	Notes
Greene	Jamestown	0.00	0.00	SR 72 (Limestone Street) / Washington Street	
Fayette	Jeffersonville	9.24	14.87	SR 41 north (North Main Street) / SR 729 north (East High Street) – South Solon	Western end of SR 41 / SR 729 concurrency
Fayette	Jeffersonville	10.28	16.54	SR 729 south (South Street)	Eastern end of SR 729 concurrency
Fayette	Jeffersonville	10.59	17.04	I-71 – Columbus, Cincinnati	Exit 69 (I-71)
Fayette	Jeffersonville	10.79	17.36	SR 41 south – Washington Court House	Eastern end of SR 41 concurrency
Fayette	Paint Township	16.57	26.67	SR 38 – Midway, Bloomingburg	
1.000 mi = 1.609 km; 1.000 km = 0.621 mi: Concurrency terminus
