= Ohio State Route 72 =

State highway in Ohio, US

State Route 72

Route information
- Maintained by ODOT
- Length: 53.27 mi (85.73 km)
- Existed: 1923–present

Major junctions
- South end: US 62 near Highland
- US 22 / SR 3 near Sabina; I-71 near Bowersville; US 35 in Jamestown; US 42 in Cedarville; I-70 near Springfield; US 40 / SR 4 / SR 41 in Springfield
- North end: SR 334 near Springfield

Location
- Country: United States
- State: Ohio
- Counties: Highland, Clinton, Greene, Clark

Highway system
- Ohio State Highway System; Interstate; US; State; Scenic
← SR 71	→ I-73

State Route 72 (SR 72) is a north–south state highway in the U.S. state of Ohio. Its southern terminus is at US 62 near Highland, and its northern terminus is at SR 334 just north of Springfield. As it travels through Springfield, Ohio, it is known as Limestone Street.

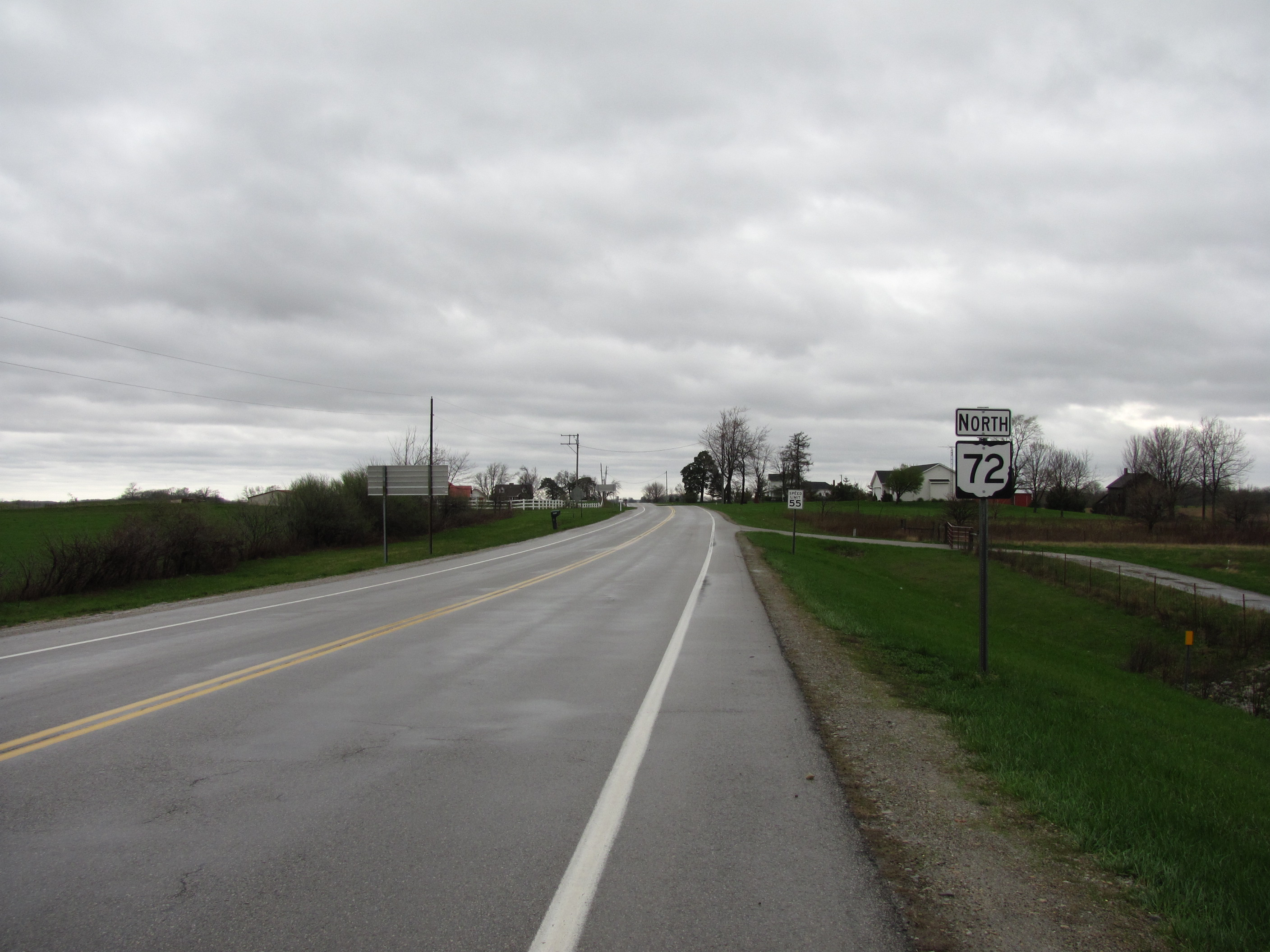
Northbound near Sabina, Ohio

== Route description ==
On November 29, 2023, the Ohio House of Representatives passed a bill to designate the portion of SR 72 between US 42 and Clifton Road in Greene County as the "Caitlin Renee Preston Memorial Highway", in honor of an 18-year-old who died along that stretch of road in May 2019 in a head-on collision with a semi-truck. This stretch of SR 72, which carries a large amount of semi traffic, had a high number of accidents and fatalities over the years. As a result of the crash that killed Preston, the state widened the roadway and added shoulders. Although the state traditionally only designates roads for military members or first responders who have given their lives in service, Preston, a recent high school graduate, had planned to enter law enforcement and study forensic science in college. As of December 2, 2023, the bill had not yet been passed by the Ohio Senate or signed by the governor.

== History ==
Prior to receiving the designation of SR 72, the route of what is now SR 72 was included within the state highway system in 1915 along various routes. The Penn Township–Springfield routes were unified as SR 72 in 1923 routed mostly along the same roads it runs today. The only major change that occurred to the highway's routing happened around 1972 when US 68 was routed out of Springfield on a freeway west of the city. SR 72 was extended north along the former US 68 to end north of the city. The interchange that currently serves as SR 334's western terminus was SR 72's northern terminus at first but was truncated to its current terminus by 2003.

== Major junctions ==
County	Location	mi	km	Destinations	Notes
Highland	Penn Township	0.00	0.00	US 62 – Leesburg, Hillsboro	
Highland	Highland	3.98	6.41	SR 28 west (Main Street) / New Lexington Avenue	Southern end of SR 28 concurrency
Highland	Fairfield Township	4.56	7.34	SR 28 east	Northern end of SR 28 concurrency
Clinton	Wayne Township	11.08	17.83	SR 729 – Sabina	
Clinton	Richland Township	14.85	23.90	US 22 / SR 3 – Sabina, Washington Court House, Wilmington	
Greene	Jefferson Township	21.00	33.80	I-71 – Columbus, Cincinnati	Exit 58 (I-71)
Greene	Jamestown	28.23	45.43	SR 734 east (Washington Street)	Western terminus of SR 734
Greene	Jamestown–Silvercreek Township municipal line	29.03	46.72	US 35 – Washington Court House, Dayton	Interchange
Greene	Cedarville	35.72	57.49	US 42 south (West Xenia Avenue) – Wilberforce	Southern end of US 42 concurrency
Greene	Cedarville	35.87	57.73	US 42 north (Chillicothe Street)	Northern end of US 42 concurrency
Greene	Clifton	39.73	63.94	SR 343 west (North Street) – John Bryan State Park	Eastern terminus of SR 343
Clark	Springfield–Springfield Township municipal line	46.37	74.63	I-70 – Columbus, Indianapolis	Exit 54 (I-70)
Clark	Springfield	48.65	78.29	East Main Street to US 40 east / SR 4 north / SR 41 south	
Clark	Springfield	48.83	78.58	US 40 west / SR 4 south / SR 41 north (East North Street)	One-way pair
Clark	Moorefield Township	52.72– 53.25	84.84– 85.70	SR 334 to SR 4 / US 68 / CR 68 (Urbana Road) – Marysville	Interchange
1.000 mi = 1.609 km; 1.000 km = 0.621 mi: Concurrency terminus
