= Ohio State Route 334 =

State highway in Clark County, Ohio, US

State Route 334

Route information
- Maintained by ODOT
- Length: 4.24 mi (6.82 km)
- Existed: 1969–present

Major junctions
- West end: US 68 near Springfield
- East end: SR 4 near Springfield

Location
- Country: United States
- State: Ohio
- Counties: Clark

Highway system
- Ohio State Highway System; Interstate; US; State; Scenic
← SR 333	→ SR 335

State Route 334 (SR 334) is an east–west state highway in the western part of the U.S. state of Ohio. The western terminus of SR 334 is at an interchange with U.S. Route 68 (US 68) less than 0.25 miles (0.40 km) north of the city limits of Springfield. Its eastern terminus is at a T-intersection with SR 4 approximately two miles (3.2 km) northeast of Springfield.

== Route description ==
The entirety of SR 334 is positioned in the northern portion of Clark County. There are no stretches of SR 334 that are included as a part of the National Highway System, a network of highways deemed most important for the economy, mobility and defense of the country. The route, very close to its western terminus, crosses over the Indiana and Ohio Railway. The route serves the southern part of the town of Northridge, serving Middle Urbana Road and Derr Road in town. Near the routes eastern terminus, it serves Bosart Road.

== History ==
SR 334 was first designated in 1969. At that time, it was routed between what was then designated as US 68 (now SR 72) and its current eastern terminus at SR 4. By 1973, with the completion of the US 68 freeway around the western side of Springfield, SR 334 was extended west a short distance to its present western terminus at the interchange it has with the then-new routing of US 68.

The 127th General Assembly designated and named SR 334 within Clark County as the "Lance Cpl. Kevin S. Smith Memorial Highway" in 2009.

== Major intersections ==
The entire route is in Clark County.

Location	mi	km	Destinations	Notes
German Township	0.00	0.00	US 68 / River Road – Urbana, Xenia	Interchange
Moorefield Township	1.04	1.67	SR 72 south / Urbana Road – Springfield	Interchange; northern terminus of SR 72
Moorefield Township	4.24	6.82	SR 4 – Mechanicsburg, Marysville	
1.000 mi = 1.609 km; 1.000 km = 0.621 mi
