= Rattlesnake Creek (Ohio) =

Coordinates: 39.26868°N 83.39408°W

Rattlesnake Creek is a tributary of Paint Creek, 42.3 miles (68.1 km) long, in south-central Ohio in the United States. Via Paint Creek and the Scioto and Ohio Rivers, it is part of the watershed of the Mississippi River, draining an area of 277 square miles (720 km^{2}). According to the Geographic Names Information System, it has also been known historically as "Rattlesnake Fork."

Rattlesnake Creek rises near South Solon in southwestern Madison County, and flows generally southeastwardly through Fayette, Clinton and Highland counties, past the town of Octa. It joins Paint Creek in Paint Creek State Park as an arm of Paint Creek Lake, 5 miles (8.0 km) south of Greenfield.

Parts of the creek flow through rapids; 3 miles (4.8 km) in Highland County have been rated Class II (IV) whitewater rapids.

A USGS stream gauge on the creek at Centerfield in Highland County recorded a mean annual discharge of 244.8 cubic feet per second (6.93 m^{3}/s) during water years 1972–1981.

== Gallery ==
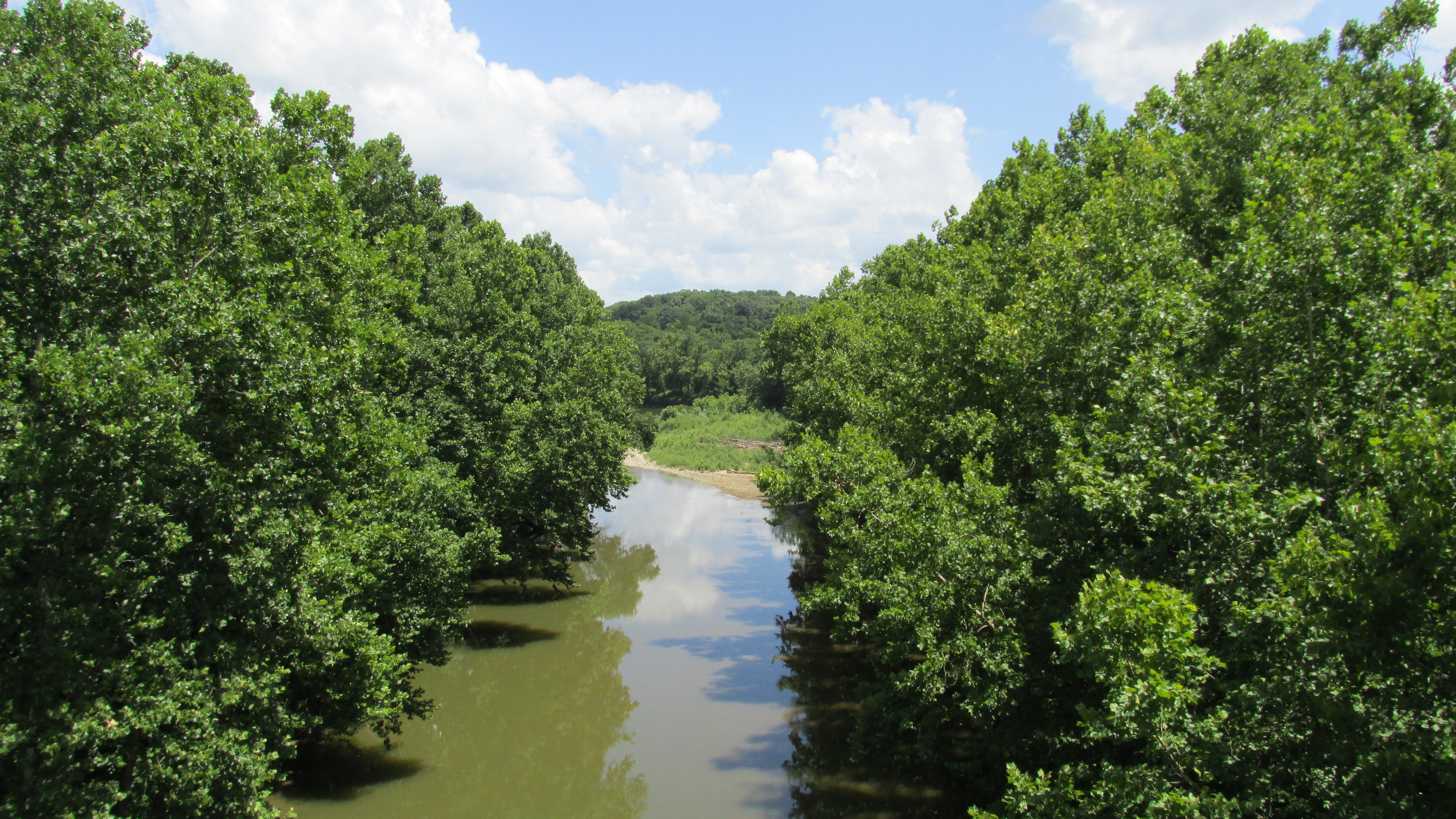
Rattlesnake Creek as viewed from Ohio State Route 138 in Highland County.

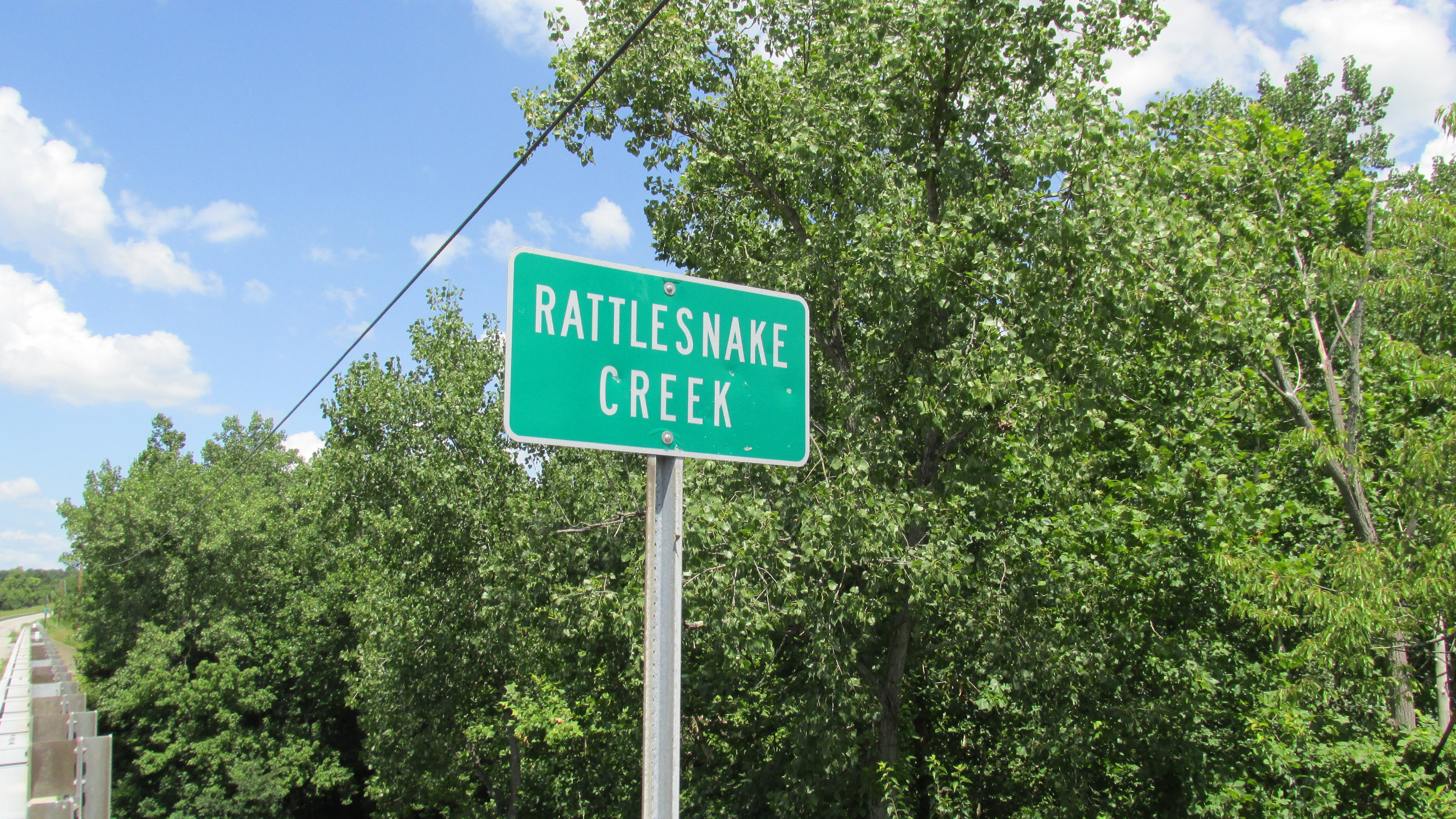
Rattlesnake Creek sign

== See also ==
- List of rivers of Ohio
