= Milledgeville, Ohio =

- Village
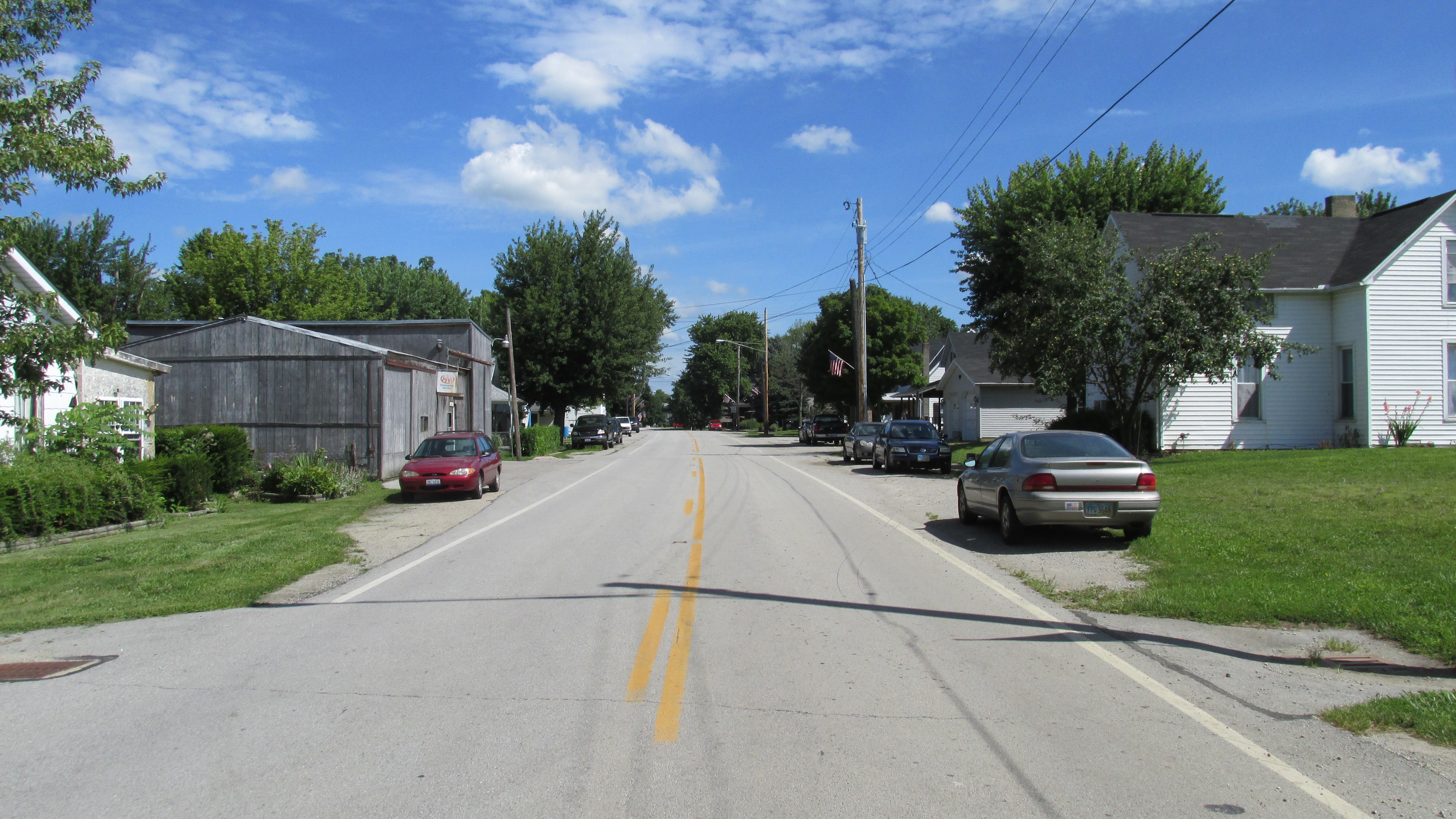
- Looking north on Main Street (Ohio State Route 729) in Milledgeville

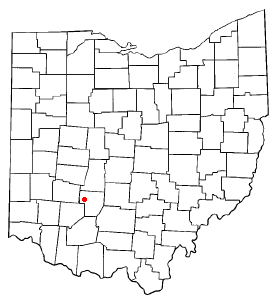
- Location of Milledgeville, Ohio

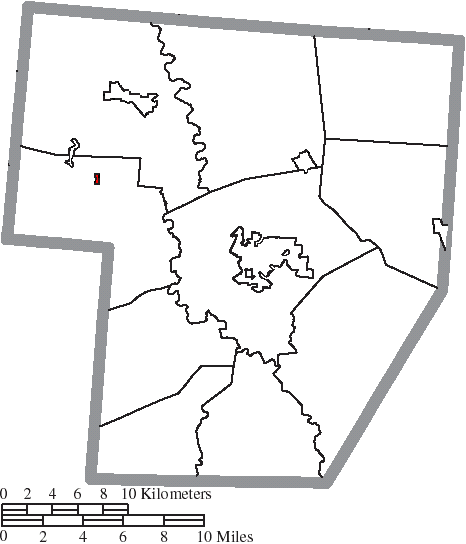
- Location of Milledgeville in Fayette County
- Coordinates: 39°35′36″N 83°35′16″W
- Country: United States
- State: Ohio
- County: Fayette
- Township: Jasper

Area
  - Total: 0.10 sq mi (0.26 km^{2})
  - Land: 0.10 sq mi (0.26 km^{2})
  - Water: 0 sq mi (0.00 km^{2})
- Elevation: 1,047 ft (319 m)

Population (2020)
  - Total: 98
  - Density: 983.0/sq mi (379.54/km^{2})
- Time zone: UTC-5 (Eastern (EST))
  - Summer (DST): UTC-4 (EDT)
- ZIP code: 43142
- Area code: 740
- FIPS code: 39-50316
- GNIS feature ID: 2399353

Milledgeville is a village in Jasper Township, Fayette County, Ohio, United States. The population was 98 at the 2020 census.

== History ==
Milledgeville was laid out in 1855. A mill was built on the town site in 1855. The name Milledgeville is an amalgamation of "mill on the edge of ville". A post office has been in operation at Milledgeville since 1877.

== Geography ==
According to the United States Census Bureau, the village has a total area of 0.10 square miles (0.26 km^{2}), all land.

== Demographics ==
Historical population
Census	Pop.	Note	%±
1880	171		—
1900	201		—
1910	187		−7.0%
1920	217		16.0%
1930	155		−28.6%
1940	178		14.8%
1950	208		16.9%
1960	222		6.7%
1970	207		−6.8%
1980	162		−21.7%
1990	120		−25.9%
2000	122		1.7%
2010	112		−8.2%
2020	98		−12.5%
U.S. Decennial Census

=== 2010 census ===
As of the census of 2010, there were 112 people, 50 households, and 29 families living in the village. The population density was 1,120.0 inhabitants per square mile (432.4/km^{2}). There were 55 housing units at an average density of 550.0 per square mile (212.4/km^{2}). The racial makeup of the village was 95.5% White, 1.8% African American, 0.9% Asian, 0.9% from other races, and 0.9% from two or more races.

There were 50 households, of which 26.0% had children under the age of 18 living with them, 34.0% were married couples living together, 16.0% had a female householder with no husband present, 8.0% had a male householder with no wife present, and 42.0% were non-families. 36.0% of all households were made up of individuals, and 10% had someone living alone who was 65 years of age or older. The average household size was 2.24 and the average family size was 2.93.

The median age in the village was 45.7 years. 22.3% of residents were under the age of 18; 4.6% were between the ages of 18 and 24; 21.5% were from 25 to 44; 34.8% were from 45 to 64; and 17% were 65 years of age or older. The gender makeup of the village was 57.1% male and 42.9% female.

=== 2000 census ===
As of the census of 2000, there were 122 people, 46 households, and 36 families living in the village. The population density was 1,202.2 inhabitants per square mile (464.2/km^{2}). There were 53 housing units at an average density of 522.3 per square mile (201.7/km^{2}). The racial makeup of the village was 98.36% White and 1.64% African American.

There were 46 households, out of which 26.1% had children under the age of 18 living with them, 63.0% were married couples living together, 4.3% had a female householder with no husband present, and 19.6% were non-families. 15.2% of all households were made up of individuals, and 8.7% had someone living alone who was 65 years of age or older. The average household size was 2.65 and the average family size was 2.92.

In the village, the population was spread out, with 19.7% under the age of 18, 5.7% from 18 to 24, 30.3% from 25 to 44, 31.1% from 45 to 64, and 13.1% who were 65 years of age or older. The median age was 37 years. For every 100 females there were 125.9 males. For every 100 females age 18 and over, there were 127.9 males.

The median income for a household in the village was $38,750, and the median income for a family was $47,917. Males had a median income of $31,875 versus $25,625 for females. The per capita income for the village was $17,045. There were no families and 4.4% of the population living below the poverty line, including no under eighteens and none of those over 64.

== Gallery ==
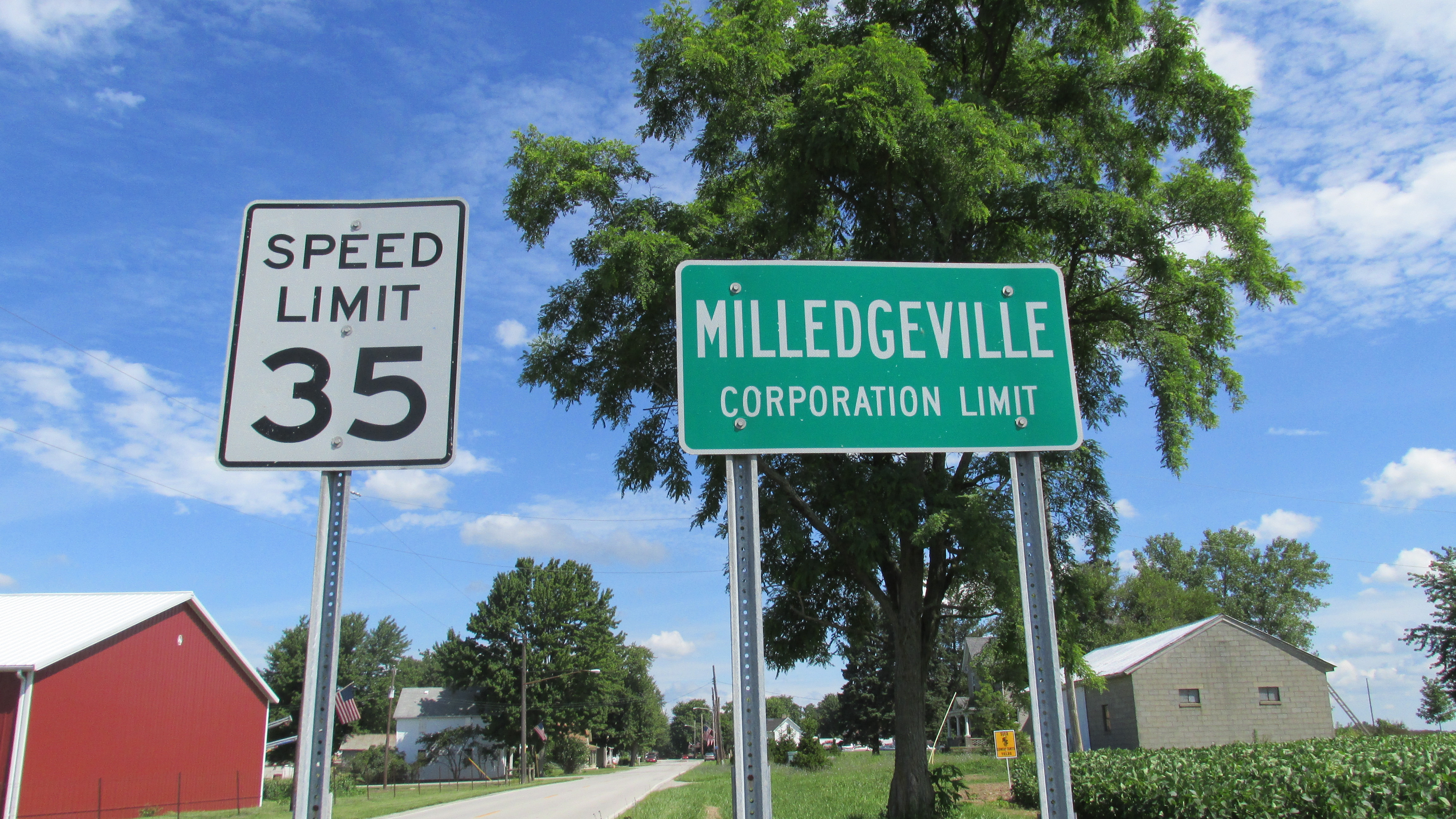
Milledgeville corporation limit sign
