= Ohio State Route 41 =

State highway in Ohio, US

State Route 41
- Route of SR 41 highlighted in red

Route information
- Maintained by ODOT
- Length: 155.21 mi (249.79 km)
- Existed: 1924–present

Major junctions
- South end: US 52 / US 62 Bus. / US 68 Bus. in Aberdeen
- US 50 in Bainbridge; US 35 near Washington Court House; US 22 / US 62 / SR 3 in Washington Court House; I-71 in Jeffersonville; US 42 in South Charleston; I-70 near Springfield; US 40 in Springfield; US 68 in SPringfield; I-75 in Troy
- North end: US 36 / SR 48 near Covington

Location
- Country: United States
- State: Ohio
- Counties: Brown, Adams, Highland, Pike, Ross, Fayette, Madison, Clark, Miami

Highway system
- Ohio State Highway System; Interstate; US; State; Scenic
← SR 40	→ US 42
← I-70	→ I-71

State Route 41 (SR 41) is a north–south state highway in the southern and western portions of the U.S. state of Ohio. Its southern terminus is at U.S. Route 52, US 62 Business, and US 68 Business in Aberdeen. (US 62 Bus. and US 68 Bus. continue south through Maysville, Kentucky crossing the Ohio River at the Simon Kenton Memorial Bridge from this point); and its northern terminus is along SR 48 at US 36 in Covington. Throughout its southern portion the route is quite hilly as it passes predominantly northward through scenic areas with state parks and monuments. Along its northern portion the route heads in a more westerly direction across mainly flat terrain as a major road through the cities of Washington Court House, Springfield, and Troy.

== Route description ==
The portion of SR 41 between Covington and Washington Road, just outside Troy, is designated as the "Sheriff's Sgt. Robert "Bobby" Elliott Memorial Highway", in honor of a Miami County sheriff's sergeant who was shot and killed by a prisoner he was guarding on February 25, 1987.

== History ==
- 1924 – Original route established; originally routed from Manchester to 1-mile (1.6 km) west of Bainbridge along the current State Route 136 from Manchester to Bentonville, and along its current alignment from Bentonville to 1-mile (1.6 km) west of Bainbridge.
- 1931 – Southern terminus moved to Aberdeen; routed along previously unnumbered roads (Aberdeen to Bradysville was a former alignment of State Route 7 before 1926, and unnumbered thereafter); Manchester to Bentonville certified as State Route 136; northern terminus also moved to 1-mile (1.6 km) east of Greenfield.
- 1962 – Extended to Covington along the former State Route 70.
- 1997 – 2 miles (3.2 km) west of Springfield to 4 miles (6.4 km) west of Springfield upgraded to divided highway.
- unknown – Extended to the Kentucky state line on the Ohio River along the previous alignment of the U.S. Route 62/U.S. Route 68 concurrency (signed as Business U.S. Route 62 in Kentucky; this extension would have occurred after the opening of the William H. Harsha Bridge in 2001). SR 41 has since been truncated back to US 52 and Market Place in Aberdeen.

On November 9, 2012, the Clark County-Springfield Transportation Coordinating Committee announced that a roundabout would be constructed at the intersection of SR 41 and SR 235 in Pike Township, which has been the site of numerous vehicle crashes, including five fatalities from 1992 to 2013. Construction on the $1.1 million project began in June 2014 and was completed the weekend before Monday, September 15. It is the first roundabout in Clark County and is believed to be the first in Ohio with all approaches at high speed, 55 mph (89 km/h).

== Major junctions ==
County	Location	mi	km	Destinations	Notes
Brown	Aberdeen	0.00	0.00	US 52 / US 62 Bus. / US 68 Bus. / Market Place – Ripley, Manchester	
Brown	Huntington Township	1.48	2.38	SR 763 north	Southern terminus of SR 763
Adams	Sprigg Township	11.94	19.22	SR 136 south – Manchester	Southern end of SR 136 concurrency
Adams	Liberty Township	13.47	21.68	SR 136 north – Cherry Fork	Northern end of SR 136 concurrency
Adams	West Union	16.81	27.05	SR 125 west / West Walnut Street – Georgetown	Southern end of SR 125 concurrency
Adams	West Union	17.03	27.41	SR 247 north (Cross Street)	Southern end of SR 247 concurrency
Adams	West Union	17.18	27.65	SR 247 south (Second Street)	Northern end of SR 247 concurrency
Adams	West Union	17.59	28.31	SR 125 east (Sunrise Avenue) / Wilson Drive – Blue Creek, Portsmouth	Northern end of SR 125 concurrency
Adams	Meigs Township	27.49	44.24	SR 781 east / %route%	Western terminus of SR 781
Adams	Meigs Township	29.68	47.77	SR 32 (James A. Rhodes Appalachian Highway) – Cincinnati, Jackson	
Adams	Franklin Township	34.03	54.77	SR 73 east – Portsmouth	Southern end of SR 73 concurrency
Adams	Franklin Township	34.29	55.18	SR 73 west – Hillsboro, Serpent Mound	Northern end of SR 73 concurrency
Highland	Sinking Spring	40.36	64.95	SR 124 east / Water Street – Jackson	Southern end of SR 124 concurrency
Highland	Brush Creek Township	41.35	66.55	SR 124 west – Hillsboro	Northern end of SR 124 concurrency
Highland	Brush Creek Township	44.99	72.40	SR 753 north / %route%	Southern terminus of SR 753
Pike	No major junctions				
Ross	No major junctions				
Pike	No major junctions				
Ross	Paxton Township	54.48	87.68	US 50 west – Hillsboro	Southern end of US 50 concurrency
Ross	Bainbridge	55.38	89.13	US 50 east (Main Street) / Quarry Street – Chillicothe	Northern end of US 50 concurrency
Ross	Buckskin Township	66.61	107.20	SR 28 east	Southern end of SR 28 concurrency
Ross	Buckskin Township	66.91	107.68	SR 138 east / CR 1 (Thrifton Road)	Southern end of SR 138 concurrency
Highland	Greenfield	67.49	108.61	SR 28 west / SR 138 east / SR 735 south (Jefferson Street) / Washington Street	Northern end of SR 28 / SR 138 concurrencies; southern end of SR 753 concurrency
Fayette	Perry Township	69.60	112.01	SR 753 north – Good Hope	Northern end of SR 753 concurrency
Fayette	Union Township	79.79– 79.92	128.41– 128.62	US 35 – Chillicothe, Dayton	Interchange
Fayette	Washington Court House	81.11	130.53	US 22 west / SR 3 south (Clinton Avenue) / US 62 west (Leesburg Avenue)	Southern end of US 22 / US 62 / SR 3 concurrency
Fayette	Washington Court House	81.60	131.32	US 22 east (Court Street) / US 62 east / SR 3 north / North Street	Northern end of US 22 / US 62 / SR 3 concurrency
Fayette	Washington Court House	81.68	131.45	US 62 west / SR 3 south (Market Street) to SR 38	
Fayette	Jeffersonville	91.44	147.16	SR 734 east	Southern end of SR 734 concurrency
Fayette	Jeffersonville	91.56– 91.76	147.35– 147.67	I-71 – Columbus, Cincinnati	Exit 69 (I-71)
Fayette	Jeffersonville	92.68	149.15	SR 729 south (South Street)	Southern end of SR 729 concurrency
Fayette	Jeffersonville	92.99	149.65	SR 729 north / SR 734 west (High Street)	Northern end of SR 729 / SR 734 concurrencies
Madison	Stokes Township	100.09	161.08	SR 323 east (Main Street)	Western terminus of SR 323
Clark	South Charleston	106.81	171.89	US 42 (Columbus Road)	
Clark	Harmony Township	109.06	175.52	SR 54 north – Catawba, Urbana	Southern terminus of SR 54
Clark	Springfield Township	114.53– 114.72	184.32– 184.62	I-70 – Columbus, Indianapolis	Exit 59 (I-70)
Clark	Springfield	118.39	190.53	US 40 east (Main Street) / Belmont Avenue	Southern end of US 40 concurrency
Clark	Springfield	119.57	192.43	SR 4 north	Interchange; southern end of SR 4 concurrency
Clark	Springfield	119.91	192.98	SR 72 (North Spring Street)	
Clark	Springfield	120.63	194.14	US 40 west / SR 4 south (North Street / Columbia Street) / Yellow Springs Street	Northern end of US 40 / SR 4 concurrencies
Clark	Springfield Township	122.88– 123.00	197.76– 197.95	US 68 – Urbana, Xenia	Interchange
Clark	Pike Township	133.50	214.85	SR 235 – New Carlisle, Lakeview	Roundabout
Miami	Elizabeth Township	137.74	221.67	SR 201 – Dayton	
Miami	Staunton Township	143.43	230.83	SR 202 – Dayton	
Miami	Troy	145.16	233.61	SR 55 (Market Street)	Roundabout
Miami	Troy	146.86– 147.04	236.35– 236.64	I-75 – Toledo, Dayton	Exit 74 (I-75)
Miami	Covington	154.74	249.03	SR 48 south (High Street)	Southern end of SR 48 concurrency
Miami	Covington	155.21	249.79	US 36 (Broadway Street) / SR 48 north (High Street)	Northern end of SR 48 concurrency
1.000 mi = 1.609 km; 1.000 km = 0.621 mi: Concurrency terminus

== Gallery ==
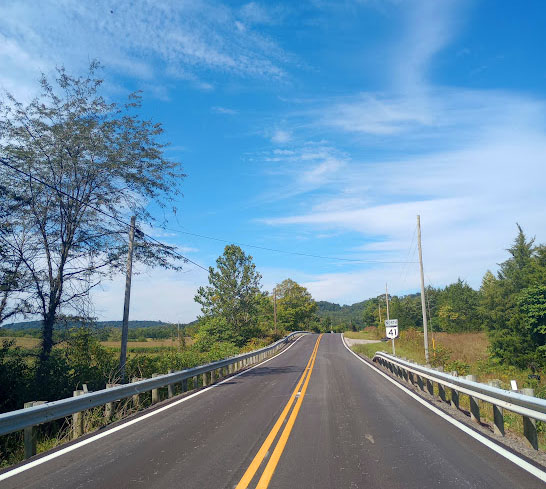
View of SR41 (northbound) near Fort Hill Earthworks and Nature Preserve

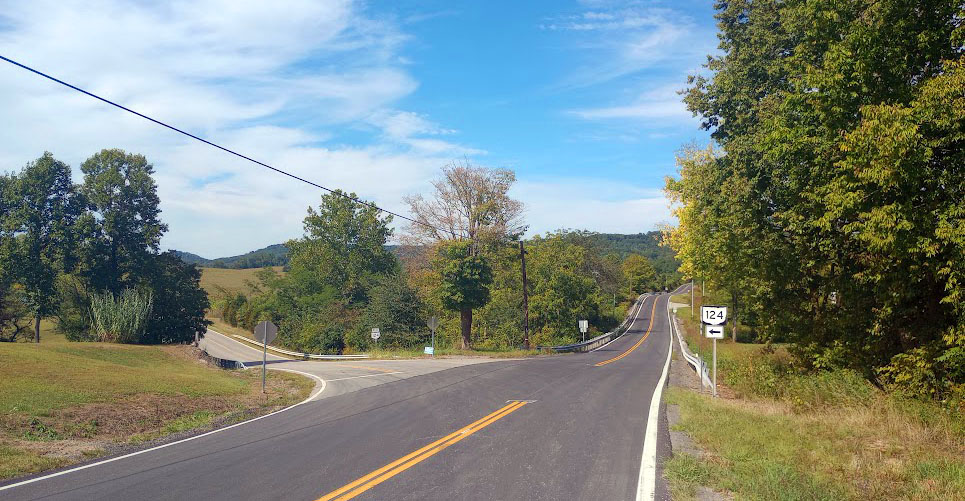
Junction of SR41 and SR124
