= Snow Hill, Ohio =

Unincorporated community in Ohio, U.S.

Coordinates: 39°21′0″N 83°43′12″W

Snow Hill is an unincorporated community in Clinton County, in the U.S. state of Ohio.

== History ==
Snow Hill was laid out and platted in 1817. A post office called Snow Hill was established in 1823, and remained in operation until 1865.
