= Octa, Ohio =

- Village
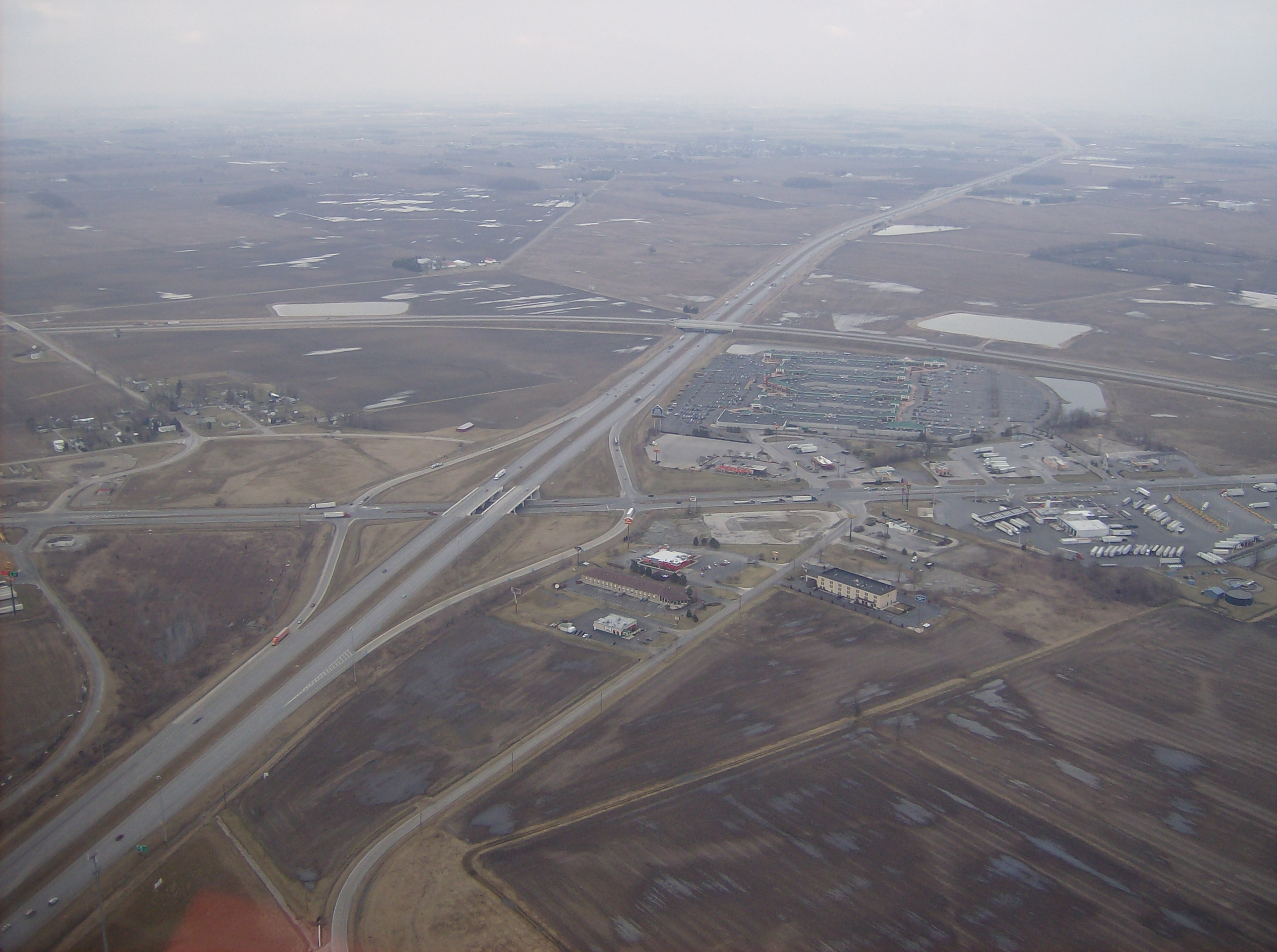
- A large shopping center along US 35 on Octa's northern edge

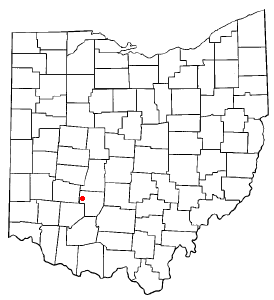
- Location of Octa, Ohio

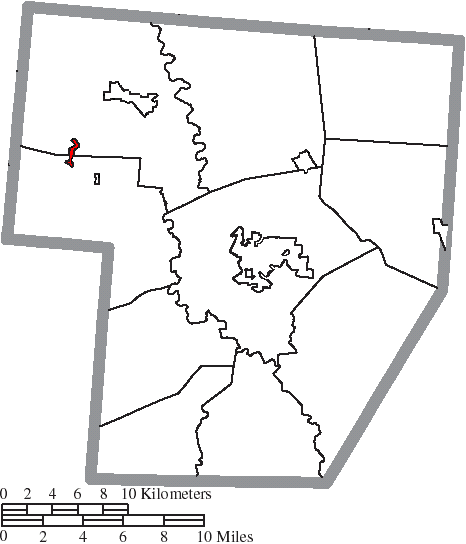
- Location of Octa in Fayette County
- Coordinates: 39°36′48″N 83°36′38″W
- Country: United States
- State: Ohio
- County: Fayette

Area
  - Total: 0.29 sq mi (0.75 km^{2})
  - Land: 0.29 sq mi (0.75 km^{2})
  - Water: 0 sq mi (0.00 km^{2})
- Elevation: 1,047 ft (319 m)

Population (2020)
  - Total: 58
  - Density: 200.0/sq mi (77.23/km^{2})
- Time zone: UTC-5 (Eastern (EST))
  - Summer (DST): UTC-4 (EDT)
- FIPS code: 39-57918
- GNIS feature ID: 2399556

Octa is a village in Fayette County, Ohio, United States, along Rattlesnake Creek. The population was 58 at the 2020 census.

== History ==
Octa was originally called Allentown, and under the latter name was laid out by Elijah Allen, and named for him. The present name honors a person named Octa Barnes. A post office called Octa was established in 1882, and remained in operation until 1929.

== Geography ==
According to the United States Census Bureau, the village has a total area of 0.28 square miles (0.73 km^{2}), all of it land.

== Parks ==
Octa contains 2 parks within its boundaries.

The linear Park currently ends in Octa and goes toward Jamestown. The Fayette County Park District currently has plans to continue the bike trail from Octa to Washington Court House in the future

The other Park in Octa contains baseball and softball diamonds and swing sets.

== Demographics ==
Historical population
Census	Pop.	Note	%±
1900	123		—
1910	91		−26.0%
1920	107		17.6%
1930	64		−40.2%
1940	67		4.7%
1950	87		29.9%
1960	95		9.2%
1970	102		7.4%
1980	74		−27.5%
1990	78		5.4%
2000	83		6.4%
2010	59		−28.9%
2020	58		−1.7%
U.S. Decennial Census

=== 2010 census ===
As of the census of 2010, there were 59 people, 30 households, and 13 families living in the village. The population density was 210.7 inhabitants per square mile (81.4/km^{2}). There were 34 housing units at an average density of 121.4 per square mile (46.9/km^{2}). The racial makeup of the village was 84.7% White and 15.3% African American. Hispanic or Latino of any race were 1.7% of the population.

There were 30 households, of which 16.7% had children under the age of 18 living with them, 26.7% were married couples living together, 6.7% had a female householder with no husband present, 10.0% had a male householder with no wife present, and 56.7% were non-families. 50.0% of all households were made up of individuals, and 20% had someone living alone who was 65 years of age or older. The average household size was 1.97 and the average family size was 2.85.

The median age in the village was 45.8 years. 20.3% of residents were under the age of 18; 6.9% were between the ages of 18 and 24; 20.4% were from 25 to 44; 28.9% were from 45 to 64; and 23.7% were 65 years of age or older. The gender makeup of the village was 49.2% male and 50.8% female.

=== 2000 census ===
As of the census of 2000, there were 83 people, 36 households, and 20 families living in the village. The population density was 291.2 inhabitants per square mile (112.4/km^{2}). There were 39 housing units at an average density of 136.8 per square mile (52.8/km^{2}). The racial makeup of the village was 93.98% White and 6.02% African American. Hispanic or Latino of any race were 4.82% of the population.

There were 36 households, out of which 25.0% had children under the age of 18 living with them, 47.2% were married couples living together, 5.6% had a female householder with no husband present, and 41.7% were non-families. 33.3% of all households were made up of individuals, and 13.9% had someone living alone who was 65 years of age or older. The average household size was 2.31 and the average family size was 3.00.

In the village, the population was spread out, with 20.5% under the age of 18, 6.0% from 18 to 24, 34.9% from 25 to 44, 25.3% from 45 to 64, and 13.3% who were 65 years of age or older. The median age was 41 years. For every 100 females there were 130.6 males. For every 100 females age 18 and over, there were 135.7 males.

The median income for a household in the village was $40,250, and the median income for a family was $40,417. Males had a median income of $21,667 versus $22,083 for females. The per capita income for the village was $15,846. There were 9.5% of families and 8.1% of the population living below the poverty line, including 9.5% of under eighteens and none of those over 64.
