= Jeffersonville, Ohio =

Village in Fayette County, Ohio, US

- Village
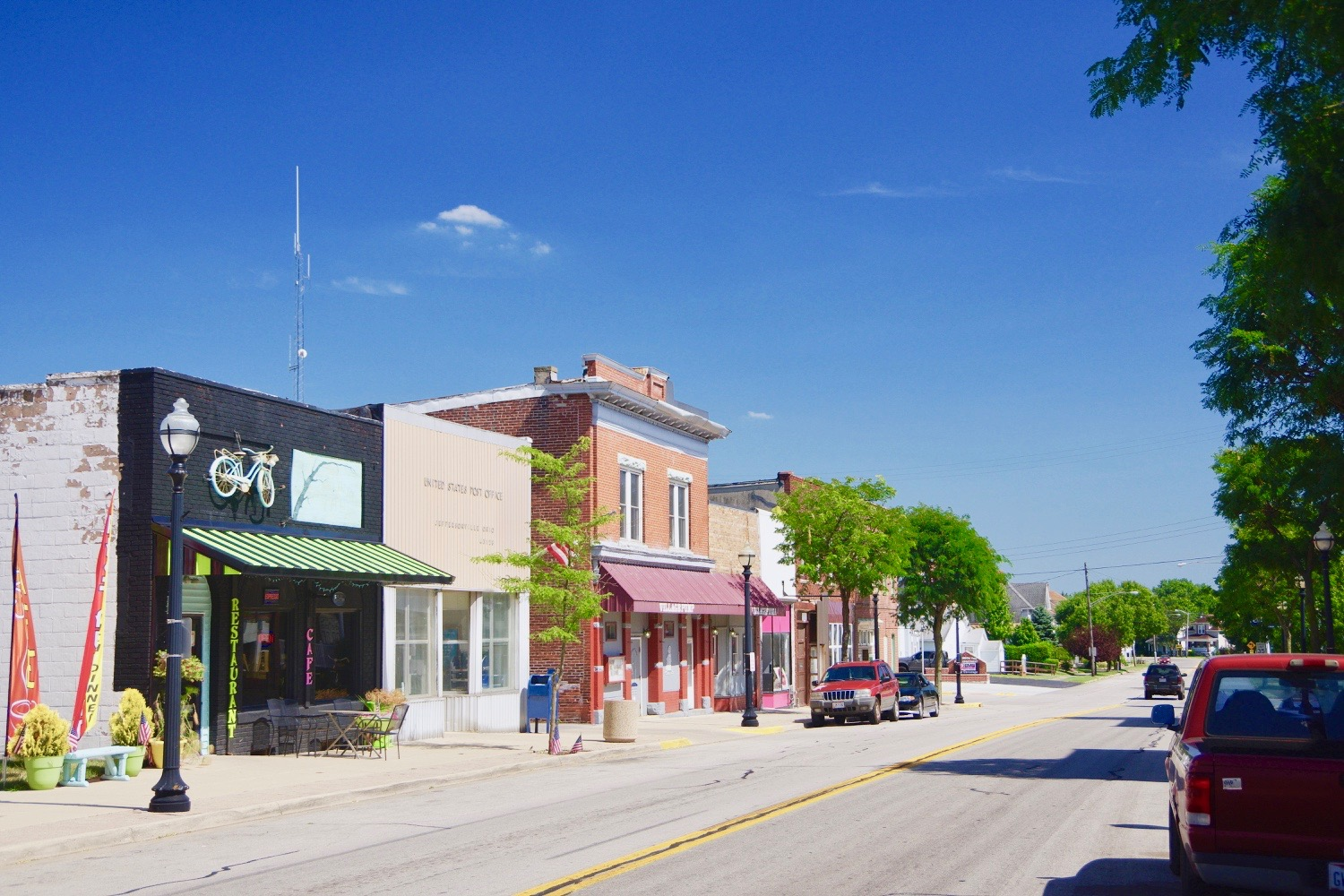
- Main Street (SR 41/SR 734)

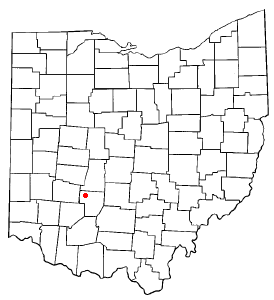
- Location of Jeffersonville, Ohio

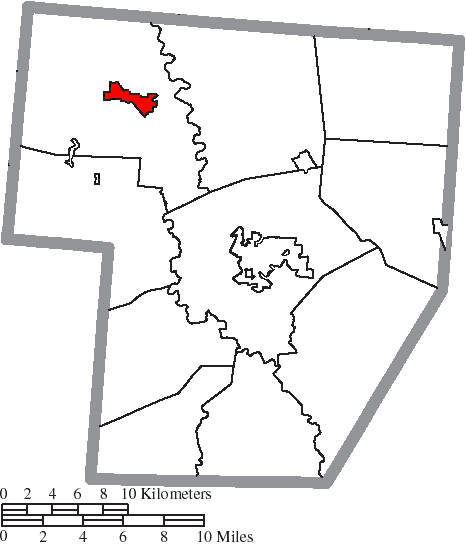
- Location of Jeffersonville in Fayette County
- Coordinates: 39°39′08″N 83°33′18″W
- Country: United States
- State: Ohio
- County: Fayette
- Township: Jefferson

Area
  - Total: 1.71 sq mi (4.42 km^{2})
  - Land: 1.67 sq mi (4.33 km^{2})
  - Water: 0.035 sq mi (0.09 km^{2})
- Elevation: 1,050 ft (320 m)

Population (2020)
  - Total: 1,258
  - Density: 752.6/sq mi (290.58/km^{2})
- Time zone: UTC-5 (Eastern (EST))
  - Summer (DST): UTC-4 (EDT)
- ZIP code: 43128
- Area code: 740
- FIPS code: 39-38920
- GNIS feature ID: 2398293
- Website: jeffersonvilleohio.org

Jeffersonville is a village in Fayette County, Ohio, United States. The population was 1,258 at the 2020 census.

== History ==
Jeffersonville was laid out in 1831. The village derives its name from Thomas Jefferson, third President of the United States. A post office has been in operation at Jeffersonville since 1834.

== Geography ==
According to the United States Census Bureau, the village has a total area of 1.74 square miles (4.51 km^{2}), of which 1.70 square miles (4.40 km^{2}) is land and 0.04 square miles (0.10 km^{2}) is water.

== Demographics ==
Historical population
Census	Pop.	Note	%±
1870	212		—
1880	374		76.4%
1900	790		—
1910	716		−9.4%
1920	700		−2.2%
1930	656		−6.3%
1940	785		19.7%
1950	865		10.2%
1960	897		3.7%
1970	1,031		14.9%
1980	1,252		21.4%
1990	1,281		2.3%
2000	1,288		0.5%
2010	1,203		−6.6%
2020	1,258		4.6%
U.S. Decennial Census

=== 2010 census ===
As of the census of 2010, there were 1,203 people, 502 households, and 322 families living in the village. The population density was 707.6 inhabitants per square mile (273.2/km^{2}). There were 574 housing units at an average density of 337.6 per square mile (130.3/km^{2}). The racial makeup of the village was 92.3% White, 4.2% African American, 0.2% Native American, 0.2% Asian, 0.3% from other races, and 2.8% from two or more races. Hispanic or Latino of any race were 1.9% of the population.

There were 502 households, of which 38.0% had children under the age of 18 living with them, 35.9% were married couples living together, 22.3% had a female householder with no husband present, 6.0% had a male householder with no wife present, and 35.9% were non-families. 28.1% of all households were made up of individuals, and 9% had someone living alone who was 65 years of age or older. The average household size was 2.40 and the average family size was 2.89.

The median age in the village was 33.9 years. 27.8% of residents were under the age of 18; 11.6% were between the ages of 18 and 24; 24% were from 25 to 44; 24.2% were from 45 to 64; and 12.2% were 65 years of age or older. The gender makeup of the village was 48.7% male and 51.3% female.

=== 2000 census ===
As of the census of 2000, there were 1,288 people, 518 households, and 361 families living in the village. The population density was 756.3 inhabitants per square mile (292.0/km^{2}). There were 586 housing units at an average density of 344.1 per square mile (132.9/km^{2}). The racial makeup of the village was 89.91% White, 6.68% African American, and 3.42% from two or more races. Hispanic or Latino of any race were 0.39% of the population.

There were 518 households, out of which 34.7% had children under the age of 18 living with them, 41.3% were married couples living together, 22.0% had a female householder with no husband present, and 30.3% were non-families. 24.5% of all households were made up of individuals, and 12.2% had someone living alone who was 65 years of age or older. The average household size was 2.49 and the average family size was 2.88.

In the village, the population was spread out, with 28.1% under the age of 18, 9.6% from 18 to 24, 27.8% from 25 to 44, 22.7% from 45 to 64, and 11.8% who were 65 years of age or older. The median age was 34 years. For every 100 females there were 92.5 males. For every 100 females age 18 and over, there were 84.1 males.

The median income for a household in the village was $31,452, and the median income for a family was $35,313. Males had a median income of $30,750 versus $21,958 for females. The per capita income for the village was $14,755. About 17.0% of families and 17.1% of the population were below the poverty line, including 24.2% of those under age 18 and 11.5% of those age 65 or over.

== Gallery ==
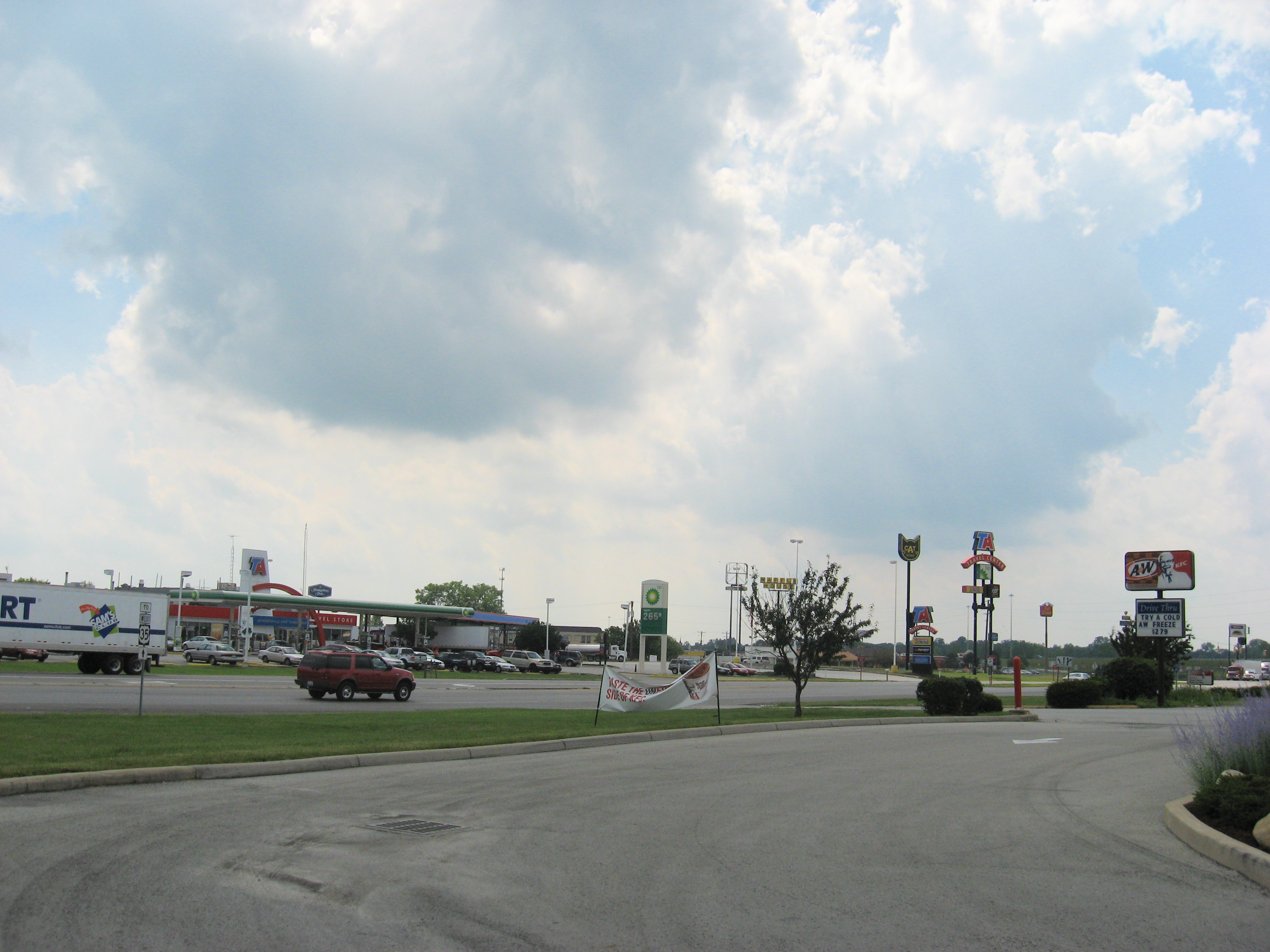
Truckstop near Jeffersonville

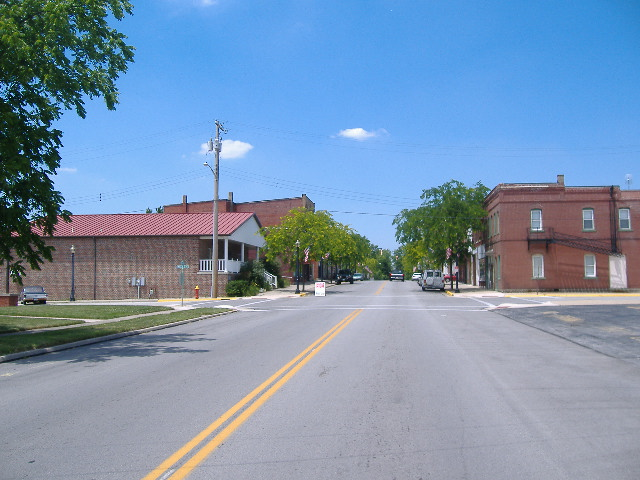
Looking northwest on Main Street (Ohio Highway 41) in Jeffersonville

== Notable people ==
- Grayson L. Kirk, president of Columbia University, advisor to the State Department, and instrumental in the formation of the United Nations
