= South Solon, Ohio =

- Village
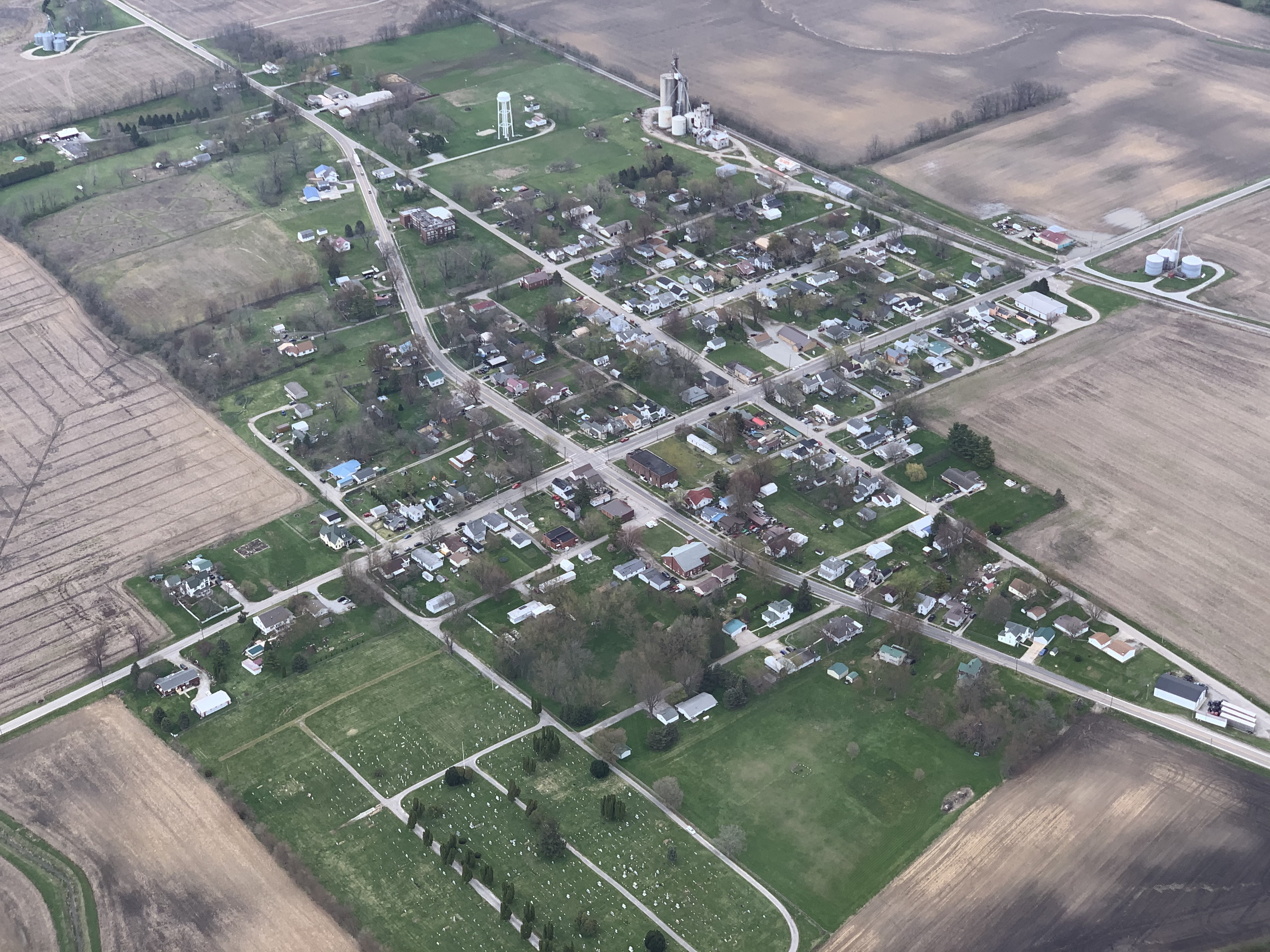
- South Solon from the air

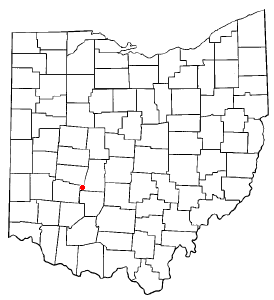
- Location of South Solon, Ohio

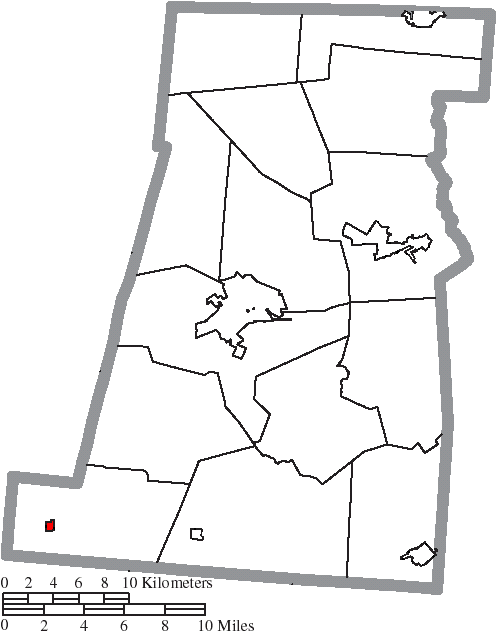
- Location of South Solon in Madison County
- Coordinates: 39°44′14″N 83°36′45″W
- Country: United States
- State: Ohio
- County: Madison
- Township: Stokes

Area
  - Total: 0.24 sq mi (0.61 km^{2})
  - Land: 0.24 sq mi (0.61 km^{2})
  - Water: 0 sq mi (0.00 km^{2})
- Elevation: 1,112 ft (339 m)

Population (2020)
  - Total: 329
  - Density: 1,398.4/sq mi (539.91/km^{2})
- Time zone: UTC-5 (Eastern (EST))
  - Summer (DST): UTC-4 (EDT)
- ZIP code: 43153
- Area code: 740
- FIPS code: 39-73768
- GNIS feature ID: 2399859

South Solon is a village in Madison County, Ohio, United States. The population was 329 at the 2020 census. Despite their similar names, South Solon is not adjacent to the city of Solon, Ohio, a suburb of Cleveland in Cuyahoga County. The two towns are approximately 170 miles (270 km) apart.

== History ==
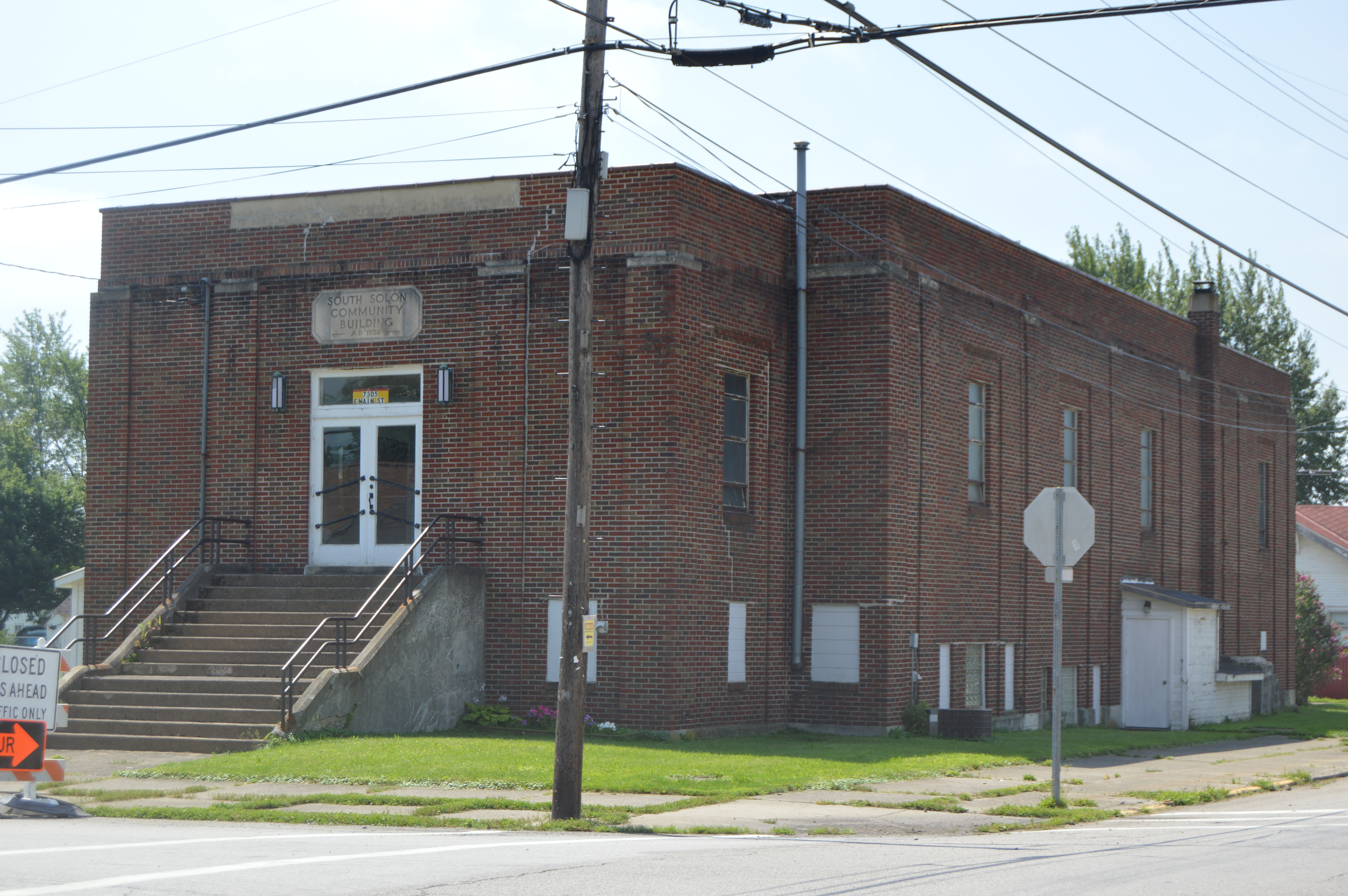
Community building

As of 1875, the community contained a post office, one grocery store, and one blacksmith shop. The village's community building was constructed in 1938 by the Public Works Administration at an estimated cost of $25,454.

== Geography ==
According to the United States Census Bureau, the village has a total area of 0.25 square miles (0.65 km^{2}), all land.

== Demographics ==
Historical population
Census	Pop.	Note	%±
1880	262		—
1890	345		31.7%
1900	319		−7.5%
1910	420		31.7%
1920	442		5.2%
1930	409		−7.5%
1940	376		−8.1%
1950	414		10.1%
1960	414		0.0%
1970	415		0.2%
1980	416		0.2%
1990	379		−8.9%
2000	405		6.9%
2010	355		−12.3%
2020	329		−7.3%
U.S. Decennial Census

=== 2010 census ===
As of the census of 2010, there were 355 people, 123 households, and 94 families living in the village. The population density was 1,420.0 inhabitants per square mile (548.3/km^{2}). There were 145 housing units at an average density of 580.0 per square mile (223.9/km^{2}). The racial makeup of the village was 96.9% White, 0.3% African American, 0.3% Native American, and 2.5% from two or more races. Hispanic or Latino of any race were 2.5% of the population.

There were 123 households, of which 38.2% had children under the age of 18 living with them, 56.9% were married couples living together, 11.4% had a female householder with no husband present, 8.1% had a male householder with no wife present, and 23.6% were non-families. 17.1% of all households were made up of individuals, and 6.5% had someone living alone who was 65 years of age or older. The average household size was 2.89 and the average family size was 3.18.

The median age in the village was 37.5 years. 24.5% of residents were under the age of 18; 11.1% were between the ages of 18 and 24; 27.4% were from 25 to 44; 26% were from 45 to 64; and 11.3% were 65 years of age or older. The gender makeup of the village was 50.7% male and 49.3% female.

=== 2000 census ===
As of the census of 2000, there were 405 people, 141 households, and 108 families living in the village. The population density was 2,033.3 inhabitants per square mile (785.1/km^{2}). There were 152 housing units at an average density of 763.1 per square mile (294.6/km^{2}). The racial makeup of the village was 99.01% White, 0.25% Native American, 0.49% Asian, and 0.25% from two or more races. Hispanic or Latino of any race were 0.99% of the population.

There were 141 households, out of which 40.4% had children under the age of 18 living with them, 56.0% were married couples living together, 11.3% had a female householder with no husband present, and 22.7% were non-families. 16.3% of all households were made up of individuals, and 9.9% had someone living alone who was 65 years of age or older. The average household size was 2.87 and the average family size was 3.25.

In the village, the population was spread out, with 31.4% under the age of 18, 10.6% from 18 to 24, 30.6% from 25 to 44, 17.3% from 45 to 64, and 10.1% who were 65 years of age or older. The median age was 31 years. For every 100 females there were 103.5 males. For every 100 females age 18 and over, there were 101.4 males.

The median income for a household in the village was $34,583, and the median income for a family was $38,750. Males had a median income of $28,456 versus $18,750 for females. The per capita income for the village was $15,152. About 8.4% of families and 10.0% of the population were below the poverty line, including 16.5% of those under age 18 and 3.6% of those age 65 or over.
