= Ohio State Route 137 =

State highway in Adams County, Ohio, US

State Route 137

Route information
- Maintained by ODOT
- Length: 3.56 mi (5.73 km)
- Existed: 1924–present

Major junctions
- South end: SR 136 in Cherry Fork
- North end: SR 247 near Seaman

Location
- Country: United States
- State: Ohio
- Counties: Adams

Highway system
- Ohio State Highway System; Interstate; US; State; Scenic
← SR 136	→ SR 138

State Route 137 (SR 137) is a short north–south state highway in the southwestern portion of Ohio. Its southern terminus is at a T-intersection with SR 136 in Cherry Fork, and its northern terminus is another T-intersection, this time with SR 247 just south of Seaman.

== Route description ==
The starting point of SR 137 is a T-intersection with SR 136 in Cherry Fork, at the intersection of Main Street and 2nd Street. Following 2nd Street to the east-northeast, SR 137 passes a number of homes as it makes its way out of Cherry Fork and into rural Wayne Township. The highway passes amid rolling hills composed primarily of farmland but also the occasional patches of trees, along with the occasional house. SR 137 bends to the northeast as it passes intersections with Paint Road, Mathias Road/Potts Road, McIntire Road and Martin Run Road. After following an S-curve to the north and then back to the northeast, SR 137 carries through back-to-back intersections with westbound and eastbound Graces Run Road. The state route comes to an end upon arriving at its junction with SR 247 at a T-intersection that forms at a sharp angle approximately one mile (1.6 km) mile south of Seaman and SR 247's junction with SR 32.

SR 137 is not included as a part of the National Highway System.

== History ==
SR 137 was established in 1924, composed of what is now SR 247 from Wrightsville to Fairfax, and SR 785 from Fairfax to Belfast. By 1927, SR 137 was re-routed southwesterly along a previously un-numbered roadway from just south of Seaman to SR 136 in Cherry Fork. The portion of SR 137 from Wrightsville to West Union became SR 247, and the portion from West Union to just south of Seaman would be removed from the state highway system, for the time being.

In 1937, the former SR 137 from West Union to just south of Seaman was re-instated into the state highway system as an extension of SR 247 that continued all the way to Hillsboro. Consequently, SR 137 was shortened into the highway that it exists as today between Cherry Fork and SR 237 just south of Seaman, with the portion of the highway between Fairfax and Belfast being re-designated as SR 785.

== Major intersections ==
The entire route is in Adams County.

Location	mi	km	Destinations	Notes
Cherry Fork	0.00	0.00	SR 136	
Wayne Township	3.56	5.73	SR 247	
1.000 mi = 1.609 km; 1.000 km = 0.621 mi
