= Manchester High School (Manchester, Ohio) =

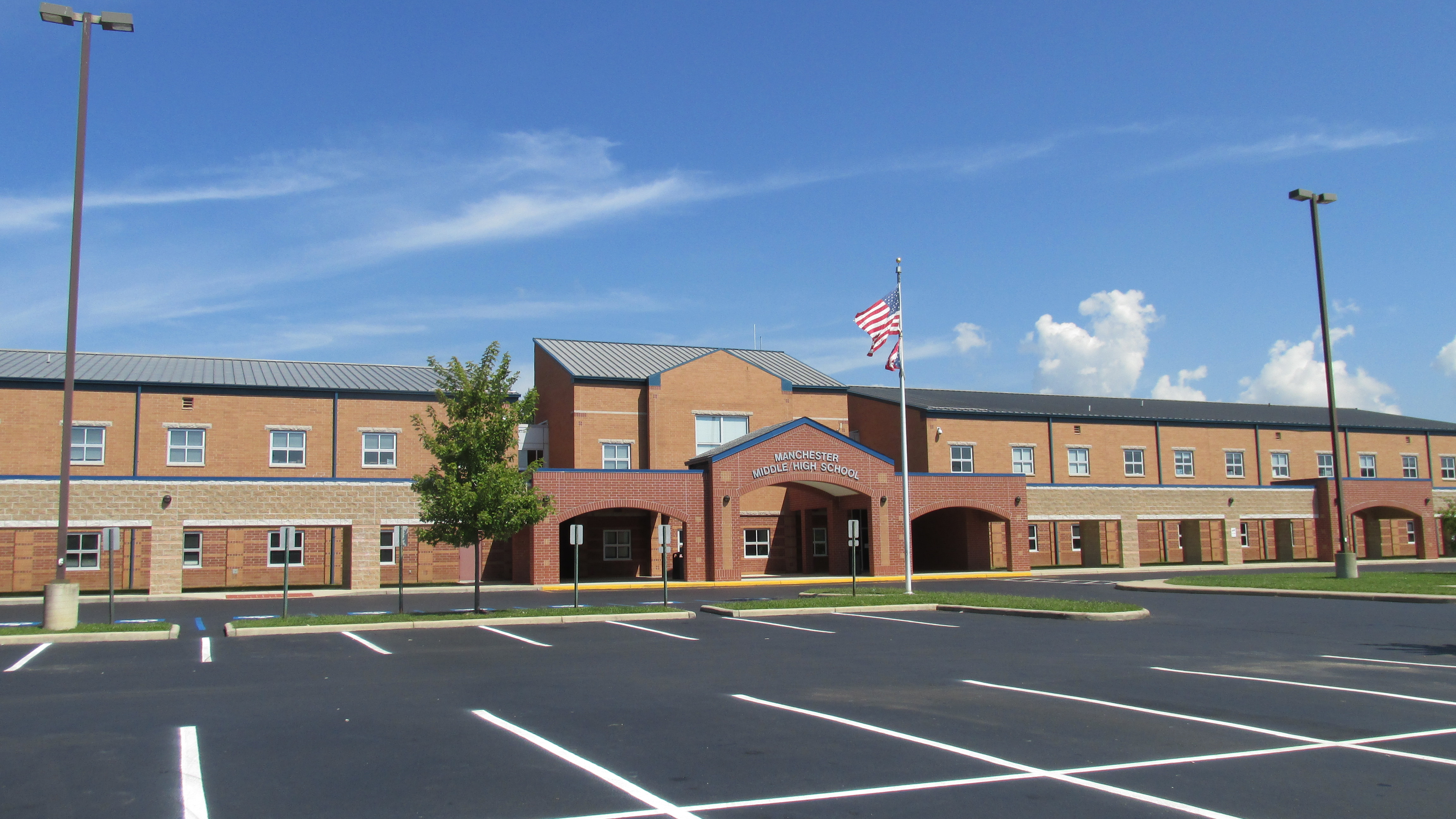

Location
- 130 Wayne Frye Dr. Manchester, Adams, Ohio 45144; United States; 38°41′41″N 83°35′21″W

Information
- Principal: Tim Davis
- Teaching staff: 22.00 (FTE)
- Grades: 7–12
- Enrollment: 335 (2024-2025)
- Student to teacher ratio: 15.23
- Colors: Blue and gold
- Athletics conference: Southern Hills Athletic League
- Team name: Greyhounds
- Accreditation: North Central Association of Colleges and Schools
- Athletic Director: Aaron Lockhart
- Website: http://www.mlsd.us

Manchester High School is a public high school in Manchester Township, Ohio. It is part of the Manchester Local Schools in Adams County, Ohio. The school offers AP courses, 23 sports, and a Gifted & Talented program. It is the only high school in Manchester Local School District.

== Background ==
The current Manchester High School building was completed in August 1997, along with three other public high schools in Adams County, North Adams, Peebles and West Union High School. All four schools used the same layout and appear almost identical from the air.

== Controversy ==
The four regular public high schools in Adams County were built at the same time and all four featured a large granite tablet outside the school carved with the Ten Commandments. The tablets were relocated after a lengthy four-year legal battle over the placement of the tablets on public property.

== Athletics ==
The school's mascot is the Appalachian Greyhound and as of December 2025, it is the only school in Adams County with a marching band.

See also Ohio High School Athletic Association and Ohio High School Athletic Conferences
