= Austin McHenry =

American baseball player (1895–1922)

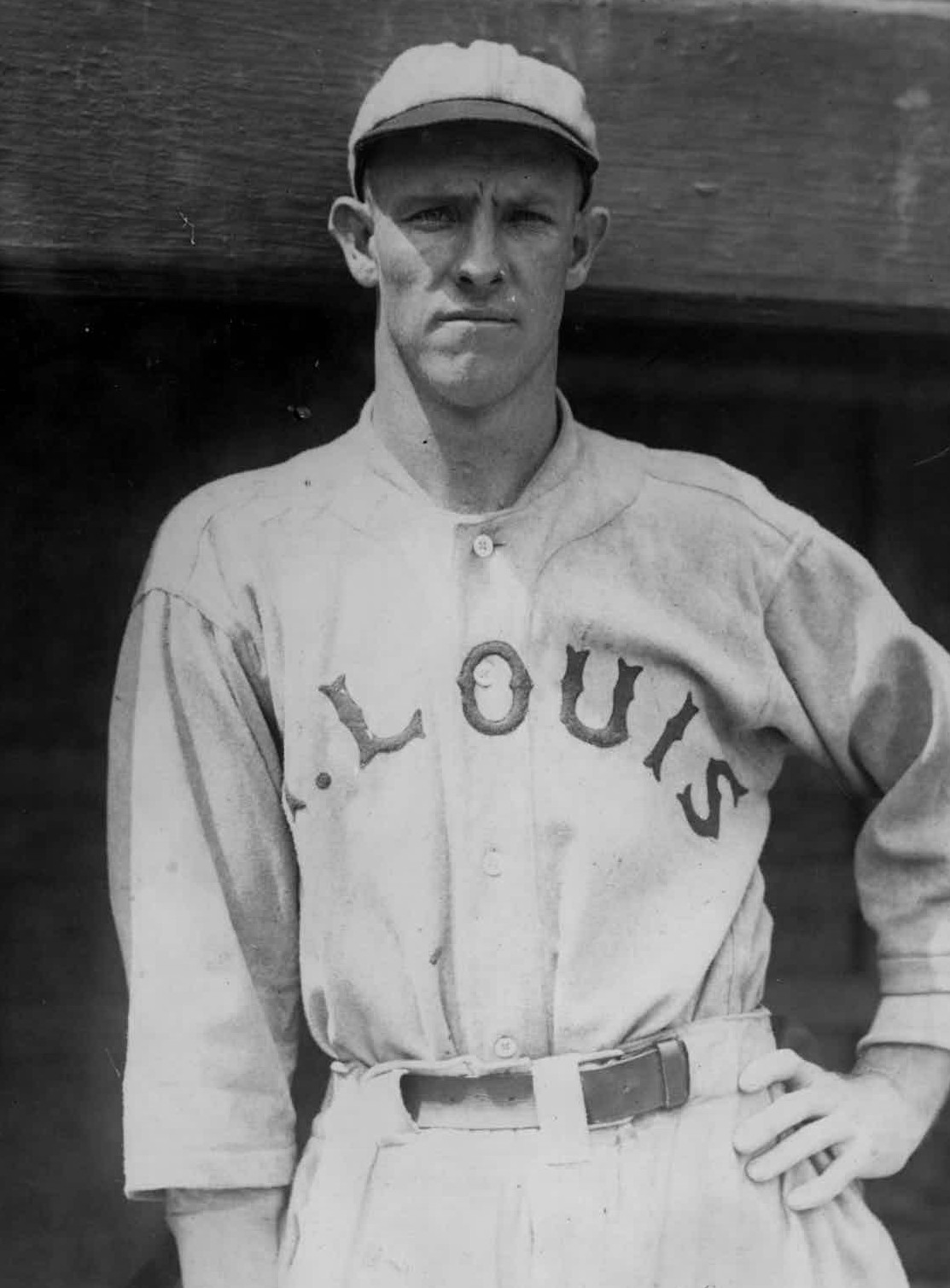
- Outfielder
- Born: September 22, 1895; Wrightsville, Ohio, U.S.
- Died: November 27, 1922 (aged 27); Blue Creek, Ohio, U.S.
- Batted: Right Threw: Right

MLB debut
- June 22, 1918, for the St. Louis Cardinals

Last MLB appearance
- July 31, 1922, for the St. Louis Cardinals

MLB statistics
- Batting average: .302
- Home runs: 34
- Runs batted in: 286
- Stats at Baseball Reference

Teams
- St. Louis Cardinals (1918–1922)

Austin Bush McHenry (September 22, 1895 – November 27, 1922) was an American professional baseball player who played outfield in the Major Leagues from 1918 to 1922 for the St. Louis Cardinals. Before his major-league promotion, he spent three seasons with the Milwaukee Brewers of the American Association. His best season in the major leagues came in 1921, when he hit .350.

McHenry became ill during the 1922 season, experiencing unsteadiness with serious vision problems. He left the team to rest and he was later diagnosed with a brain tumor. Surgery was unsuccessful, and McHenry died at home in late 1922.

== Early life ==
McHenry was born in Wrightsville, Adams County, Ohio. He made his professional debut with the Portsmouth Cobblers of the Ohio State League. McHenry, who had been a second baseman up to that point, was converted to an outfielder with Portsmouth. By October 1915, a column in the Portsmouth Daily Times said that McHenry had the potential to play in the major leagues. Beginning in 1916, he played with the minor-league Milwaukee Brewers of the American Association.

Invited to spend spring training with the Cincinnati Reds before the 1918 season, McHenry sustained a broken nose when he was struck by a foul ball off the bat of Sherry Magee. The injury put McHenry in the hospital and sidelined him for a month. He was sent back to the Brewers.

== Major league career ==
McHenry was called up to the major leagues with the St. Louis Cardinals during the 1918 season. He was one of the best players in the National League in 1921. His .350 batting average and .531 slugging percentage were both second-highest in the league behind his teammate Rogers Hornsby. His 201 hits, 102 runs batted in (RBI) and 92 runs scored were all career highs for him by large margins.

== Illness and death ==
By June 1922, McHenry's play had declined noticeably, and he complained of visual problems. He began to have difficulty judging and catching fly balls in the outfield, and his batting statistics also suffered. Cardinals general manager Branch Rickey was concerned enough to send McHenry home to Ohio to rest and to consult with McHenry's father, who was a physician. About a month later, McHenry returned to the team briefly, but he was still in poor condition. Sent home again, McHenry sought medical care in Cincinnati, where doctors detected a brain tumor.

McHenry underwent brain surgery, but the tumor, due to its location, could not be entirely removed. Writing to Rickey from the hospital, he used a baseball analogy to describe his tenuous health situation: "I'm afraid it is three and two on me in the bottom of the ninth. I must hit the next one out." By early September, Rickey lamented the team's loss of McHenry, pointing out that McHenry had the team's third-highest RBI total even though he had played only 40 games while his teammates had played 120 games.

On November 22, 1922, newspaper reports indicated McHenry had been released from the hospital. His physicians had determined there was no hope for McHenry's survival and thought he should spend his last days at home with family members. He died at his home in Ohio a few days later.

== See also ==
- List of baseball players who died during their careers
