= Ohio State Route 785 =

State highway in Highland County, Ohio, US

State Route 785

Route information
- Maintained by ODOT
- Length: 3.60 mi (5.79 km)
- Existed: 1937–present

Major junctions
- West end: SR 247 in Fairfax
- East end: SR 73 in Belfast

Location
- Country: United States
- State: Ohio
- Counties: Highland

Highway system
- Ohio State Highway System; Interstate; US; State; Scenic
← SR 782	→ SR 788

State Route 785 (SR 785) is a short east–west state highway in the southern portion of the U.S. state of Ohio. The western terminus of SR 785 is at SR 247 7.75 miles (12.47 km) north of Seaman in the community of Fairfax. Its eastern terminus is at its junction with SR 73 approximately nine miles (14 km) west of Sinking Spring in the community of Belfast.

Established in the late 1930s, SR 785 is a short connector route between SR 247 and SR 73 in rural southern Highland County southeast of Hillsboro.

== Route description ==
All of SR 785 is situated within the rural Jackson Township in southern Highland County. The state highway is not included within the National Highway System.

SR 785 begins at the intersection of SR 247 and Fair Ridge Road (County Road 3). Heading southeast from there, the route passes a few homes and into a patch of woods. The highway turns east at Greenbriar Road, then bends to the northeast, and then more east-northeasterly as it emerges from the forest and into a landscape dominated by open farmland. After passing the Young Road intersection, SR 785 goes amid a small patch of woods, then re-emerges into open farmland as it curves to the east. Just after Locust Road, the highway bends to the northeast, nudging some patches of trees alongside the roadway to the southeast. SR 785 intersects Storer Lane, then follows an S-curve going east-northeast and back to the northeast. The highway enters into a residential area just prior to where it meets SR 73, which marks its endpoint.

== History ==
SR 785 was designated in 1937 along the routing between SR 247 and SR 73 southeast of Hillsboro that is maintains to this day. The highway has not experienced any significant changes to its routing since it was established.

== Major intersections ==
The entire route is in Jackson Township, Highland County.

mi	km	Destinations	Notes
0.00	0.00	SR 247 / Fair Ridge Road	
3.60	5.79	SR 73	
1.000 mi = 1.609 km; 1.000 km = 0.621 mi
