= Ohio Valley Career and Technical Center =

Location
- 175 Lloyd Road; West Union, (Adams County), Ohio 45693; United States
- Coordinates: 38°48′45″N 83°35′3″W

Information
- Director: Tad Mitchell
- Grades: 11–12
- Colors: Purple and black
- Website: https://www.ovsd.us/o/ovctc
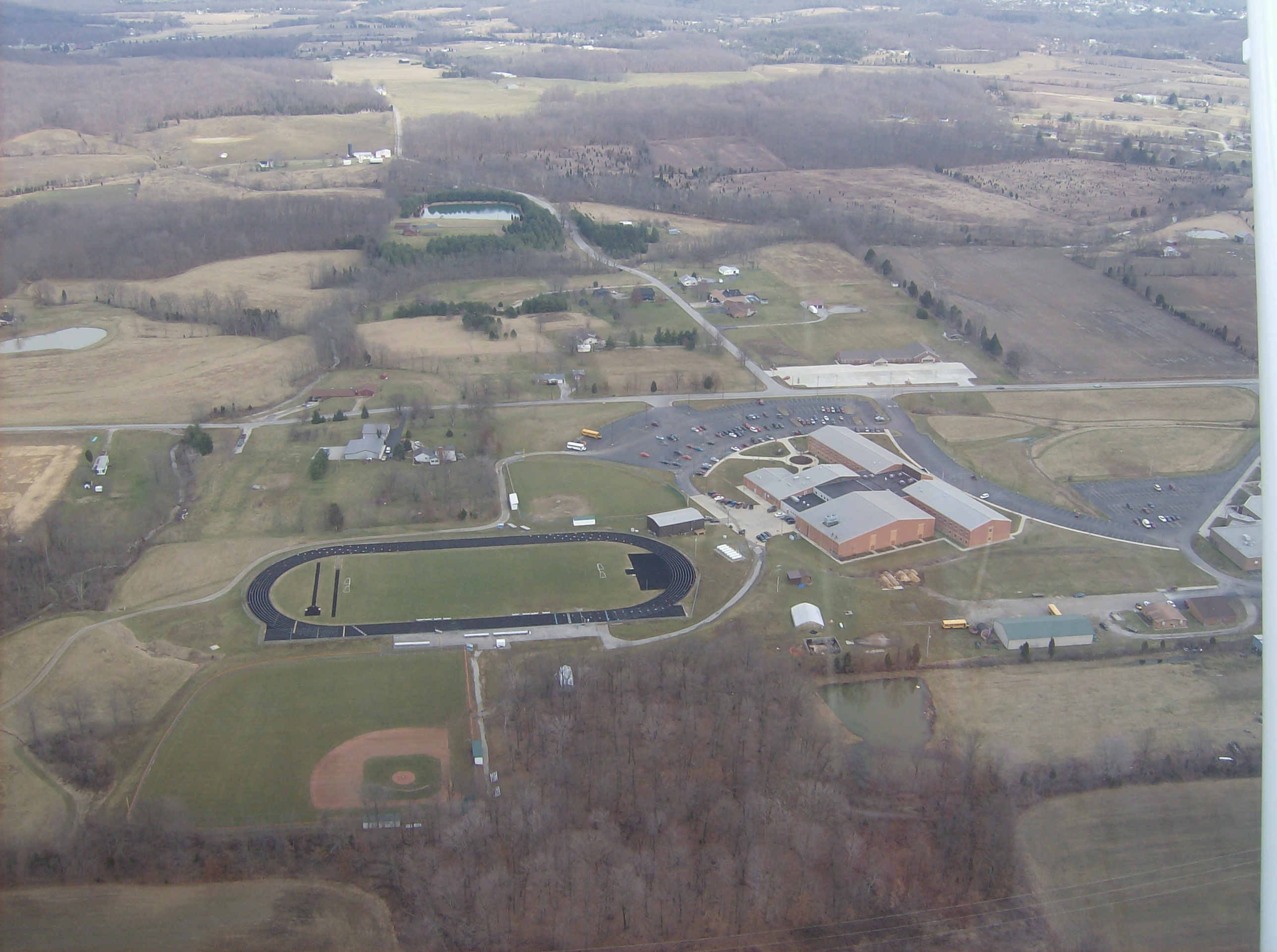

Ohio Valley Career and Technical Center is a public high school located outside West Union, Ohio, United States. It is one of four high schools in the Adams County/Ohio Valley School District, the others being North Adams, Peebles and West Union High Schools. The student population is made up from three schools previously listed, along with students from Manchester High School.

The school has programs for administrative office technology/business professionals, agricultural mechanics, automotive technology, carpentry, cosmetology, farm business management, health career and technology, information systems technology, machine shop, masonry and restaurant management. It also has classes for mathematics, science, language arts, government and personal finance and, from the academic year 2011–2012, elective courses including literature in film, creative writing, current events and study skills/OGT preparation.

The school's yearbook has students from all four Adams County high schools.
