= Ohio State Route 770 =

State highway in Adams County, Ohio, US

State Route 770

Route information
- Maintained by ODOT
- Length: 10.55 mi (16.98 km)
- Existed: 1937–present

Major junctions
- South end: SR 247 in Seaman
- North end: SR 73 near Seaman

Location
- Country: United States
- State: Ohio
- Counties: Adams

Highway system
- Ohio State Highway System; Interstate; US; State; Scenic
← SR 768	→ SR 771

State Route 770 (SR 770, OH 770) is a north–south state highway in the southern portion of the U.S. state of Ohio. The southern terminus of State Route 770 is at State Route 247 in Seaman. Its northern terminus is at its junction with State Route 73 about 10.5 miles (16.9 km) north of Seaman, just inside of the Adams-Highland County Line.

== Route description ==
State Route 770 is located entirely within the northern portion of Adams County. The route is not incorporated as a part of the National Highway System.

== History ==
1937 marked the year in which State Route 770 made its debut. Originally, the highway was routed from the intersection it has with Old State Route 32 approximately 3 miles (4.8 km) northeast of Seaman up to its current northern terminus at State Route 73. Heading west-to-east through the original southern terminus in 1937 was the former State Route 74, State Route 32's predecessor. By 1981, with the completion of the new four-lane divided highway stretch of State Route 32 south of Seaman, the former stretch of two-lane State Route 32 between State Route 770's former southern terminus and State Route 247 in Seaman became an extension of State Route 770.

== Major intersections ==
The entire route is in Adams County.

Location	mi	km	Destinations	Notes
Seaman	0.00	0.00	SR 247 (Main Street)	
Bratton Township	10.55	16.98	SR 73	
1.000 mi = 1.609 km; 1.000 km = 0.621 mi
