= Peebles High School =

Peebles High School may refer to:

- Peebles High School (Ohio) in the United States
- Peebles High School, Peeblesshire in Scotland
