= Ohio State Route 135 =

State highway in Highland County, Ohio, US

State Route 135

Route information
- Maintained by ODOT
- Length: 2.82 mi (4.54 km)
- Existed: 1923–present

Major junctions
- South end: US 50 near Lynchburg
- North end: SR 134 in Lynchburg

Location
- Country: United States
- State: Ohio
- Counties: Highland

Highway system
- Ohio State Highway System; Interstate; US; State; Scenic
| ← SR 134 | → SR 136 |

State Route 135 (SR 135) is a short north–south state highway in the southwestern portion of the U.S. state of Ohio. SR 135 travels from its southern terminus at a T-intersection with U.S. Route 50 (US 50) approximately two miles (3.2 km) south of the village of Lynchburg to its northern terminus in Lynchburg at a T-intersection with SR 134.

== Route description ==
The entirety of SR 135 is located within the western portion of Highland County. Beginning at a T-intersection with US 50 in Dodson Township, SR 135 travels to the northwest through a landscape primarily composed of farmland, with a few homes appearing along the way. After a brief westerly overlap of Anderson Road, the state route turns north, passes some patches of trees just prior to passing into Lynchburg. SR 135 bends to the north-northwest as it follows Sycamore Street through a residential neighborhood. The highway then turns west onto South Street at a four-way stop intersection, and continues through the heavily residential portion of the village through its endpoint where it meets SR 134 at a T-intersection.

SR 135 is not included as a component of the National Highway System.

== History ==
The SR 135 designation was created in 1923. It has maintained the same short alignment in western Highland County throughout its history. The only change of any significance is that the route intersecting SR 135 at its southern terminus prior to the coming of US 50 was originally designated as SR 26. At its northern terminus, SR 135 has always intersected SR 134.

Pop Culture Reference:

This route is mentioned in an episode of Seinfeld ("The Bottle Deposit, Part II") where Kramer and Newman are following Jerry's stolen Saab convertible through Ohio on their way to Michigan in a mail truck full of bottles to recycle.

== Major intersections ==
The entire route is in Highland County.

| Location | mi | km | Destinations | Notes |
|---|---|---|---|---|
| Dodson Township | 0.00 | 0.00 | US 50 – Hillsboro, Fayetteville | |
| Lynchburg | 2.82 | 4.54 | SR 134 | |
1.000 mi = 1.609 km; 1.000 km = 0.621 mi
