= North Adams High School =

Public school in Ohio, United States

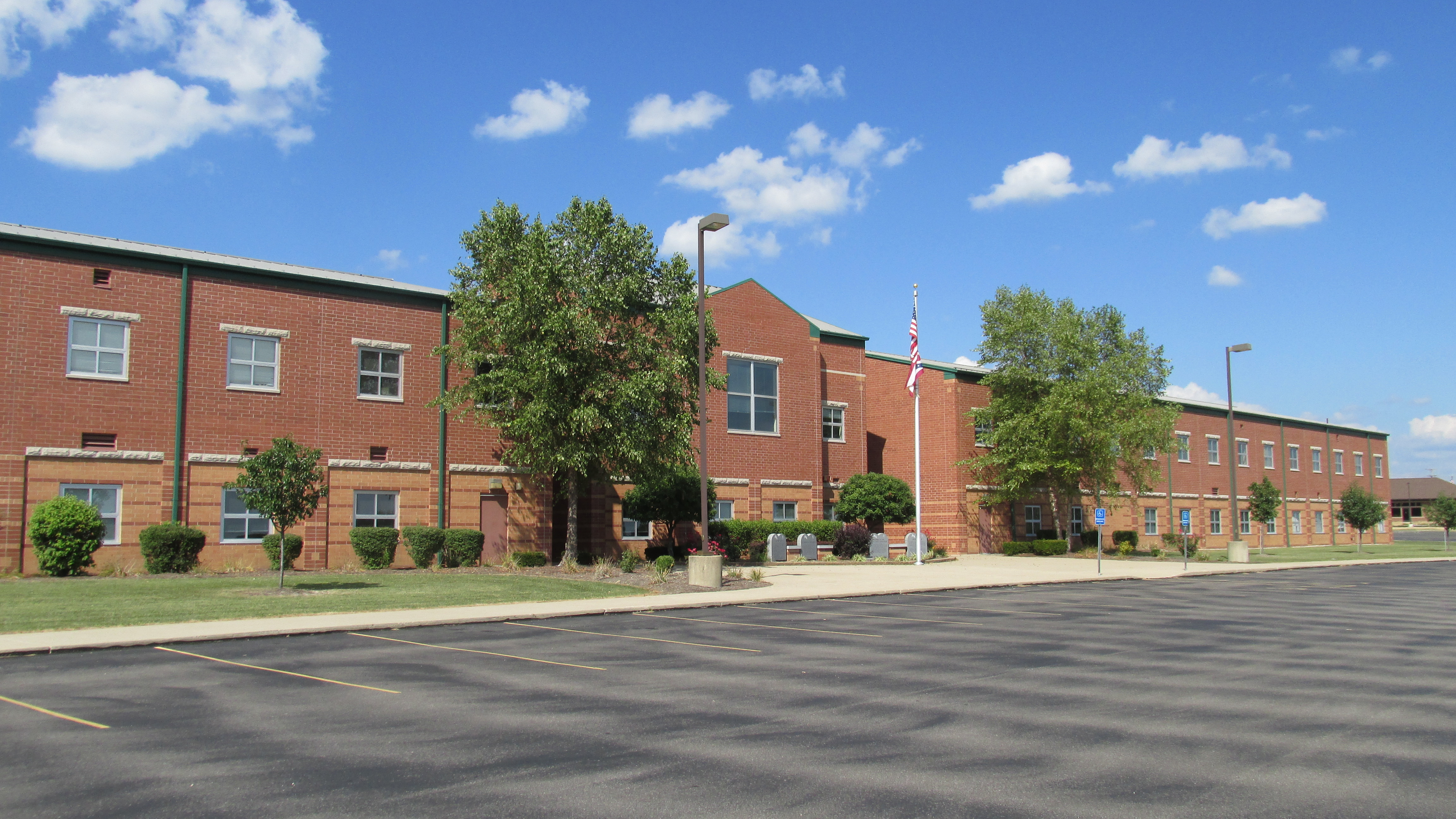
- North Adams High School

Location
- 96 Green Devil Drive; Seaman, (Adams County), Ohio 45679; United States; 38°56′29″N 83°35′17″W

Information
- Superintendent: Ryan Shupert
- Principal: Karl Boerger
- Teaching staff: 27.00 (FTE)
- Grades: 7–12
- Enrollment: 462 (2024–2025)
- Student to teacher ratio: 17.11
- Colors: Green and Gold
- Athletics conference: Southern Hills Athletic Conference
- Mascot: Green Devil
- Team name: Green Devils, Lady Devils
- USNWR ranking: #12,029 in National Rankings; #450 in Ohio High Schools; #1 in Adams County Ohio Valley Local High Schools
- Website: www.ovsd.us/o/nahs
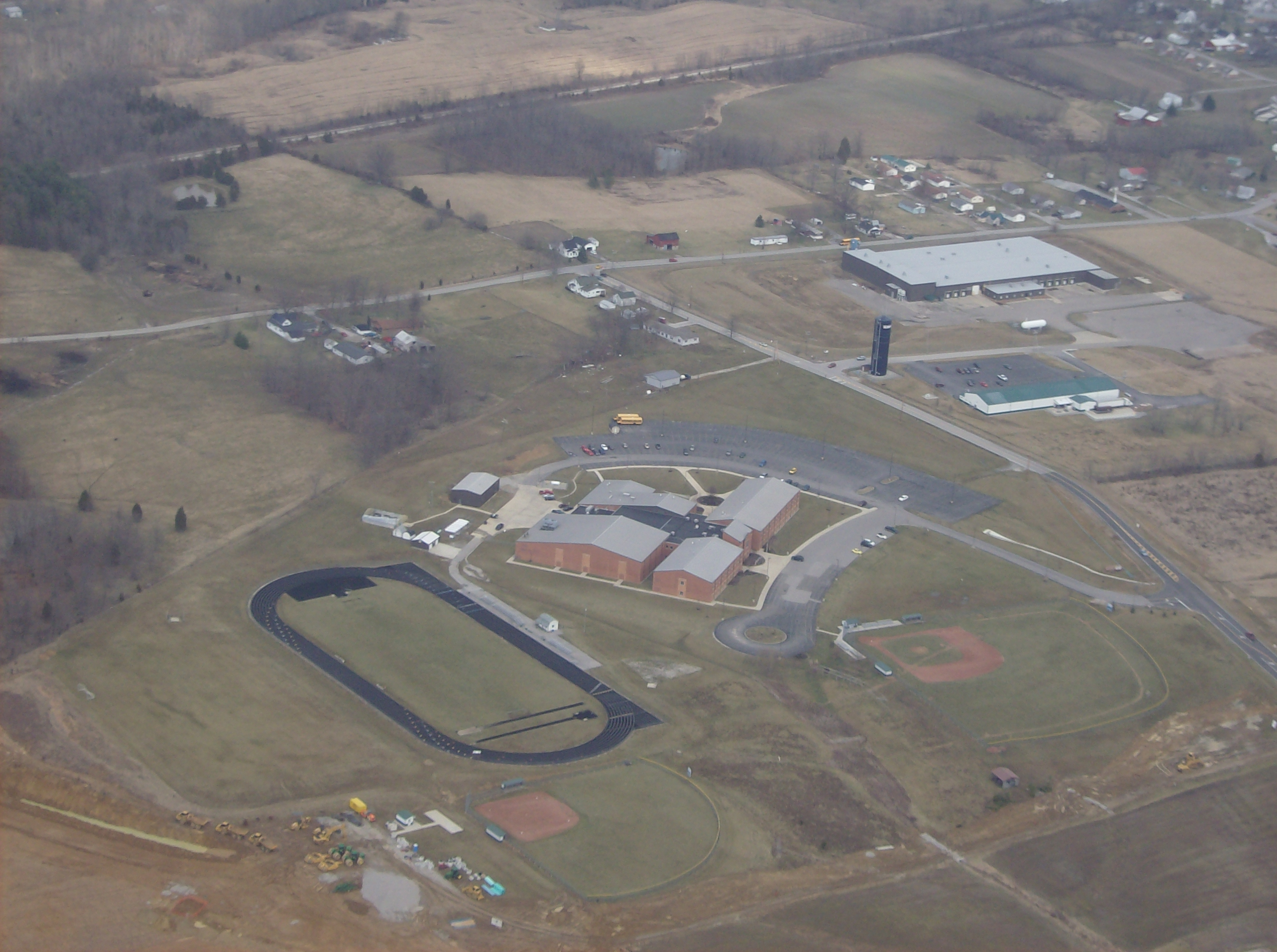
- North Adams High School from the air

North Adams High School is a public high school located in Seaman, Adams County, Ohio, United States. It is one of three high schools in the Adams County/Ohio Valley School District, the other two being Peebles High School and West Union High School. The district also has a vocational school (Ohio Valley Career and Technical Center).

== Background ==
The current North Adams High School building was completed in August 1997, along with three other public high schools in Adams County: Peebles, West Union, and Manchester. All four schools use the same layout and appear almost identical from the air.

== Controversy ==
The four regular public high schools in Adams County were built at the same time and all four featured a large granite tablet outside the school carved with the Ten Commandments. They were relocated after a lengthy four-year legal battle over the placement of the tablets on public property.

== Athletics ==
See also Ohio High School Athletic Association and Southern Hills Athletic Conference

=== Sports ===
The school offers basketball, cross country, golf, soccer, and track & field; baseball only to boys; and softball and volleyball only to girls. As of 2022, archery began being offered, quickly becoming one of the school's biggest clubs.

=== Records ===
At the OHSAA Division 3 State Championships 2025, which took place on June 6 and 7 at the Jesse Owens Memorial Stadium, Beau Hesler, a junior at the time, broke a personal and school record, running a 1:51.78 for the 800 Meter Run Finals and winning first place.
