= Ohio State Route 247 =

State highway in southern Ohio, US

State Route 247

Route information
- Maintained by ODOT
- Length: 36.49 mi (58.72 km)
- Existed: 1925–present

Major junctions
- South end: Dead end at the Ohio River in Wrightsville
- US 52 in Wrightsville
- North end: SR 73 in Hillsboro

Location
- Country: United States
- State: Ohio
- Counties: Adams, Highland

Highway system
- Ohio State Highway System; Interstate; US; State; Scenic
← SR 246	→ SR 248

State Route 247 (SR 247) is a 30.49-mile (49.07 km) long north–south state highway in the southern part of the U.S. state of Ohio. SR 247 has its southern terminus at a dead end overlooking the Ohio River 0.35 miles (0.56 km) south of its junction with U.S. Route 52 (US 52), nearly 4.75 miles (7.64 km) northeast of Manchester. The northern terminus of SR 247 is at a signalized intersection with State Route 73 in Hillsboro.

== Route description ==
SR 247 travels through the western half of Adams County and the southern portion of Highland County. There are no segments of SR 247 that are included within the National Highway System (NHS). The NHS is a network of highways identified as being most important for the economy, mobility and defense of the nation.

== History ==
The SR 247 designation was established in 1925. The highway was originally routed along its present alignment from its southern terminus northeast of Manchester to downtown West Union, replacing what was designated as SR 137.

In 1937, SR 247 was extended north to its present endpoint in Hillsboro, via a previously un-numbered roadway north to the current intersection with SR 137 south of Seaman, then what was the portion of SR 137 from that point north to the current western terminus of SR 785 (also was a part of SR 137 to that point), and finally along another un-numbered roadway from the point of the present SR 785 junction north into Hillsboro.

== Major intersections ==
County	Location	mi	km	Destinations	Notes
Adams	Monroe Township	0.00	0.00	Ohio River	Southern terminus at dead end
Adams	Monroe Township	0.35	0.56	US 52 – Portsmouth, Manchester	
Adams	West Union	7.34	11.81	SR 41 north / SR 125 east (East Main Street) / North Second Street	Southern end of SR 41 / SR 125 concurrency
Adams	West Union	7.49	12.05	SR 41 south / SR 125 west (West Main Street) / South Cross Street	Northern end of SR 41 / SR 125 concurrency
Adams	Wayne Township	16.58	26.68	SR 137 west	Eastern terminus of SR 137
Adams	Seaman	17.26	27.78	SR 32 (James A. Rhodes Appalachian Highway)	
Adams	Seaman	18.16	29.23	SR 770 north (Thomas Avenue)	Southern terminus of SR 770
Highland	Jackson Township	25.87	41.63	SR 785 east / CR 3 (Fair Ridge Road)	Western terminus of SR 785
Highland	Hillsboro	36.49	58.72	SR 73 (Muntz Street / Belfast Road) / South East Street	
1.000 mi = 1.609 km; 1.000 km = 0.621 mi: Concurrency terminus
