= Adams County Regional Medical Center =

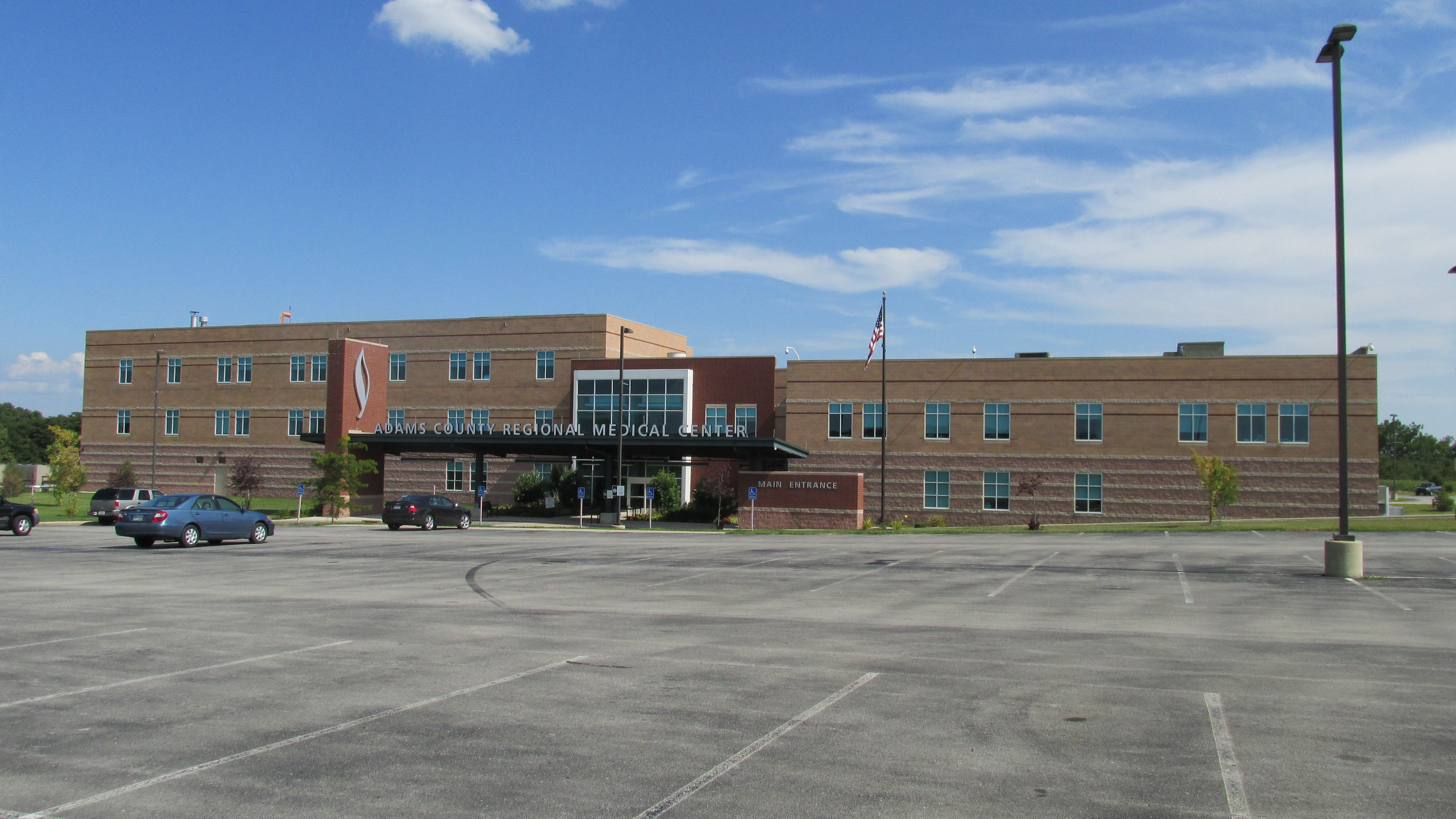

Geography
- Location: Seaman, Ohio, Adams County, Ohio, United States
- Coordinates: 38°56′02″N 83°35′05″W

Organization
- Type: public hospital

Services
- Emergency department: 24 Hours
- Beds: 25

Links
- Website: http://www.acrmc.com/
- Lists: Hospitals in Ohio

Adams County Regional Medical Center (ACRMC) is a 25-bed public hospital located near Seaman, Ohio. Operating since the 1940s, they moved to a new building in 2007. The hospital serves Adams County, Ohio.

== Services ==
Services include Inpatient Hospice Suite, Sleep Studies Center, Outpatient IV Therapy Suite and Outpatient Observation, Emergency Department; a Surgical Suite, an endoscopy suite and a same-day surgery suite. ACRMC is certified as an American Heart Association Training Center. ACRMC has maintained accreditation by The Joint Commission since 1986.

== Hospital rating data ==
The HealthGrades website contains the latest quality data for Adams County Medical Center, as of 2015. For this rating section three different types of data from HealthGrades are presented: quality ratings for four inpatient conditions and procedures, four patient safety indicators, percentage of patients giving the hospital a 9 or 10 (the two highest possible ratings).

For inpatient conditions and procedures, there are three possible ratings: worse than expected, as expected, better than expected. For Adams County Medical Center the data for this category is:

- Worse than expected - 2
- As expected - 2
- Better than expected - 0

For patient safety indicators, there are the same three possible ratings. For this hospital four indicators were rated as:

- Worse than expected - 0
- As expected - 4
- Better than expected - 0

Data for patients giving this hospital a 9 or 10 are:

- Patients rating this hospital as a 9 or 10 - 66%
- Patients rating hospitals as a 9 or 10 nationally - 69%
