= Julie Salamon =

American author and journalist (born 1953)

Julia Salamon
- Born: July 10, 1953 (age 73); Cincinnati, Ohio, U.S.
- Education: Tufts University; New York University (JD)
- Occupations: Author; journalist
- Children: 2
- Website: juliesalamon.com

Julie Salamon (born July 10, 1953) is an American author and journalist, who has been a film and television critic for the Wall Street Journal and the New York Times. She is the author of thirteen books, for adults and children. In 2021, she was co-host and writer of Season Two of TCM's The Plot Thickens, based on her book The Devil's Candy. Since 1999 she has been board chair of BRC, a NYC non-profit that provides housing, medical care, job training and social services to New Yorkers who have become homeless.

== Early life ==
The daughter of Holocaust survivors, Lilly (born Rapaport) and Alexander Salamon, she was born in Cincinnati, Ohio, and raised with her sister ( Dr. Suzanne Salamon of Brookline, MA) in Seaman, a rural village located in Adams County, Ohio, where her father was the town doctor. After graduating from Tufts University in Boston, Salamon moved to New York City, where she received her J.D. degree from New York University.

== Career ==
=== Journalism ===
While in law school, Salamon was a summer intern at the Pittsburgh Press, and then at The Wall Street Journal, where she was hired as a reporter in the New York bureau (covering commodities and then banking) upon graduation from NYU. Salamon became the Journal's film critic in 1983, a job she held for 11 years. In 2000, she became a television critic and reporter for The New York Times, where she stayed until 2005.

Salamon's journalism has also appeared in The New Yorker, Vanity Fair, Vogue, Harper's Bazaar, and The New Republic. She has been an adjunct professor at NYU's Tisch School of the Arts and a lecturer at Columbia University. For her 2008 work Hospital, she was a Kaiser Media Fellow for 2006–07. She was inducted into the Ohio Women's Hall of Fame in September 2008, and has been a multiple recipient of the Ohioana Library Award. In the summer of 2010, she was a writing fellow at the MacDowell Colony in Peterborough, New Hampshire, where she completed Wendy and the Lost Boys.

=== Books ===
Salamon has written thirteen books in several genres; in June 2021, Unlikely Friends, a memoir of her Appalachian childhood, was published by Audible as an Audible Original. In 2019, her account of the 1985 hijacking of the Achille Lauro, An Innocent Bystander, was published by Little, Brown. Her other books for adults include The Net of Dreams (1996), Facing the Wind (2001), and Rambam's Ladder (2003). The Devil's Candy (1991) is considered a Hollywood classic about filmmaking gone awry by film critics and journalists. Her novella, The Christmas Tree (1996), with illustrations by Jill Weber, was a New York Times best-seller and has been translated into eight languages. Wendy and the Lost Boys, a biography of Pulitzer Prize-winning playwright Wendy Wasserstein, was published by The Penguin Press on August 22, 2011, and became a New York Times best-seller. With illustrator Jill Weber, she has written two books for middle-grade children, Mutts Promise and Cat in the City, both published by Dial and "One More Story, Tata" (2024 from Astra Publishing.

=== Public speaking and appearances ===
She hosts AT LUNCH a monthly interview program with prominent leaders in the world of culture, literature and politics. She has been interviewed on national and local television and radio programs, including National Public Radio, Good Morning America, and The Today Show. She has lectured at universities and elementary schools as well as hospitals and medical schools nationwide, including Cedars-Sinai Medical Center in Los Angeles, Massachusetts General Cancer Center in Boston, and Narrative Medicine Rounds at Columbia University Medical Center.

Salamon was for several years a mentor at Girls Write Now, a writing and mentoring program for New York City public high school girls, and—in addition to BRC—is a board member of the American Jewish Historical Society

== Personal life ==
Salamon is married to William Abrams. They live in downtown Manhattan and have two adult children--Roxie and Eli Salamon-Abrams, a son-in-law Graeme Daubert, and a grandchild Harlan Simi Salamon-Daubert.
