= Seaman, Ohio =

- Village
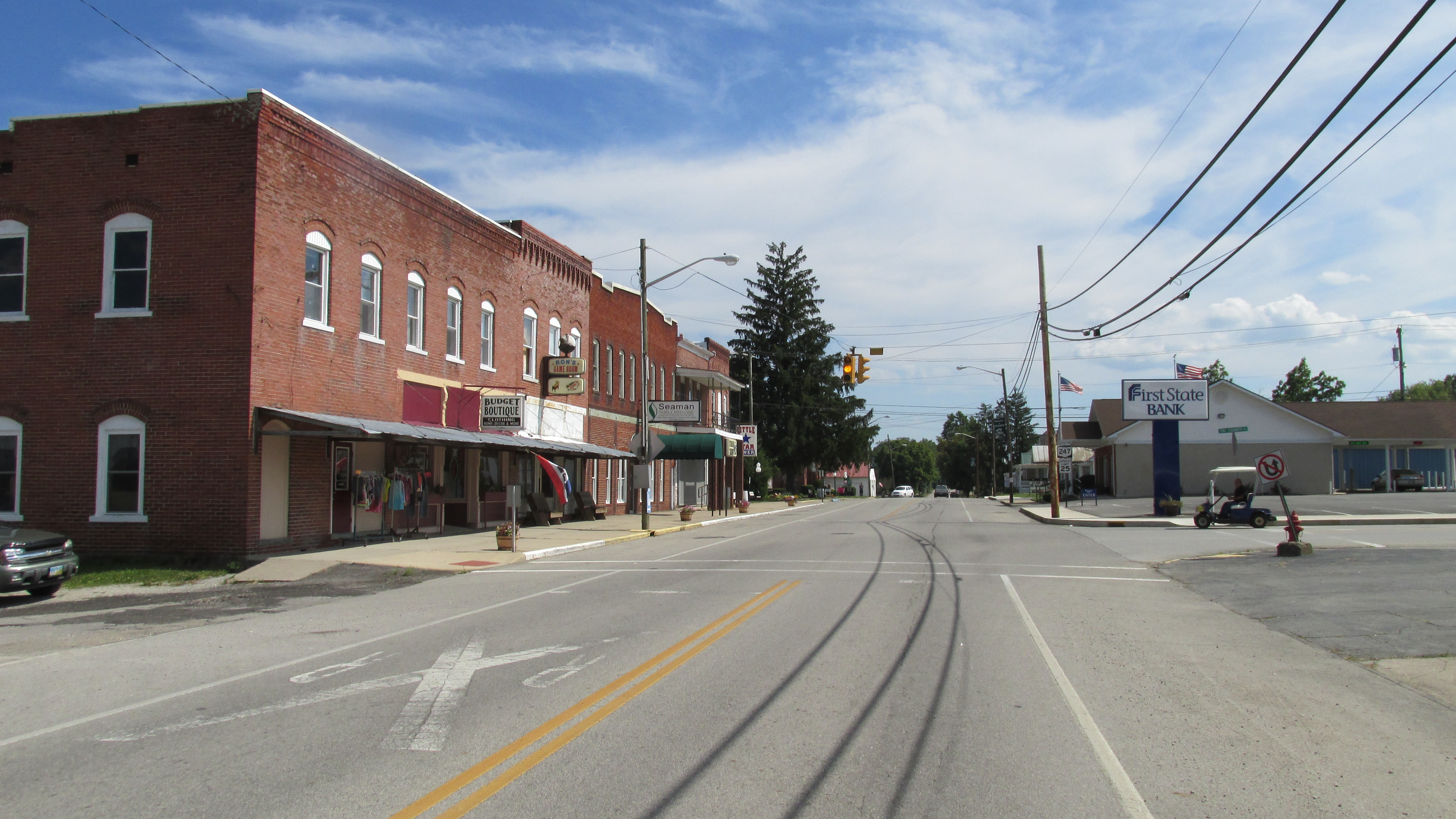
- Main Street

- Location in Adams County and the state of Ohio.
- Coordinates: 38°55′59″N 83°34′04″W
- Country: United States
- State: Ohio
- County: Adams
- Township: Scott

Area
  - Total: 1.07 sq mi (2.76 km^{2})
  - Land: 1.07 sq mi (2.76 km^{2})
  - Water: 0 sq mi (0.00 km^{2})
- Elevation: 899 ft (274 m)

Population (2020)
  - Total: 973
  - Estimate (2024): 970
  - Density: 911.5/sq mi (351.94/km^{2})
- Time zone: UTC-5 (Eastern (EST))
  - Summer (DST): UTC-4 (EDT)
- ZIP code: 45679
- Area codes: 937, 326
- FIPS code: 39-71206
- GNIS feature ID: 2399778

Seaman is a village in Scott Township, Adams County, Ohio, United States. The population was 973 at the 2020 census.

State Route 247 passes through Seaman. Seaman is adjacent to Ohio State Route 32, a four lane divided highway known as the Appalachian Highway. The Appalachian Highway links Seaman to Cincinnati. A traffic signal is at the intersection of Routes 32 and 247.

Seaman is served by North Adams High School, the Adams County/Ohio Valley School District, and the North Adams Public Library, a branch of the Adams County Public Library. Seaman is also home to the Adams County Regional Medical Center, a county hospital built in 2007.

== History ==
Seaman was laid out in 1888 when the railroad was extended to that point. The Cincinnati & Eastern Railroad today is the Cincinnati Eastern Railroad (CCET). The village was named after the local Seaman family.

== Geography ==
According to the United States Census Bureau, the village has a total area of 1.07 square miles (2.77 km^{2}), all land.

== Demographics ==
Historical population
Census	Pop.	Note	%±
1920	553		—
1930	717		29.7%
1940	726		1.3%
1950	736		1.4%
1960	714		−3.0%
1970	866		21.3%
1980	1,039		20.0%
1990	1,013		−2.5%
2000	1,039		2.6%
2010	944		−9.1%
2020	973		3.1%
U.S. Decennial Census

=== 2010 census ===
As of the census of 2010, 944 people, 368 households, and 254 families resided in the village. The population density was 882.2 inhabitants per square mile (340.6/km^{2}). There were 425 housing units at an average density of 397.2 per square mile (153.4/km^{2}). The racial makeup of the village was 99.9% White, 0.01% African American, 0.03% Native American, 0.01% Asian, 0.03% from other races, and 0.01% from two or more races. Hispanic or Latino of any race were 0.01% of the population.

There were 368 households, of which 36.7% had children under the age of 18 living with them, 47.3% were married couples living together, 17.1% had a female householder with no husband present, 4.6% had a male householder with no wife present, and 31.0% were non-families. 27.4% of all households were made up of individuals, and 15.2% had someone living alone who was 65 years of age or older. The average household size was 2.57 and the average family size was 3.09.

The median age in the village was 35.5 years. 26.9% of residents were under the age of 18; 8.7% were between the ages of 18 and 24; 26.3% were from 25 to 44; 21.8% were from 45 to 64; and 16.3% were 65 years of age or older. The gender makeup of the village was 47.7% male and 52.3% female.

=== 2000 census ===
As of the census of 2000, there were 1,039 people, 407 households, and 271 families residing in the village. The population density was 1,017.6 inhabitants per square mile (392.9/km^{2}). There were 443 housing units at an average density of 433.9 per square mile (167.5/km^{2}). The racial makeup of the village was 98.56% White, 0.48% Native American, 0.10% Asian, 0.10% from other races, and 0.77% from two or more races. Hispanic or Latino of any race were 0.77% of the population.

There were 407 households, out of which 33.9% had children under the age of 18 living with them, 52.1% were married couples living together, 11.1% had a female householder with no husband present, and 33.2% were non-families. 29.5% of all households were made up of individuals, and 15.5% had someone living alone who was 65 years of age or older. The average household size was 2.55 and the average family size was 3.18.

In the village, the population was spread out, with 29.4% under the age of 18, 8.9% from 18 to 24, 26.7% from 25 to 44, 19.0% from 45 to 64, and 16.2% who were 65 years of age or older. The median age was 35 years. For every 100 females there were 84.5 males. For every 100 females age 18 and over, there were 85.4 males.

The median income for a household in the village was $24,938, and the median income for a family was $34,375. Males had a median income of $31,328 versus $17,381 for females. The per capita income for the village was $13,138. About 17.1% of families and 21.7% of the population were below the poverty line, including 29.5% of those under age 18 and 17.8% of those age 65 or over.

== Hospital ==
Seaman is served by the Adams County Regional Medical Center, located at 230 Medical Center Drive. The hospital was known as Adams County Hospital, and was in West Union, but was renamed and relocated to Seaman.

== Notable people ==
- Julie Salamon, author; former movie critic of the Wall Street Journal and journalist at the New York Times.

== Gallery ==
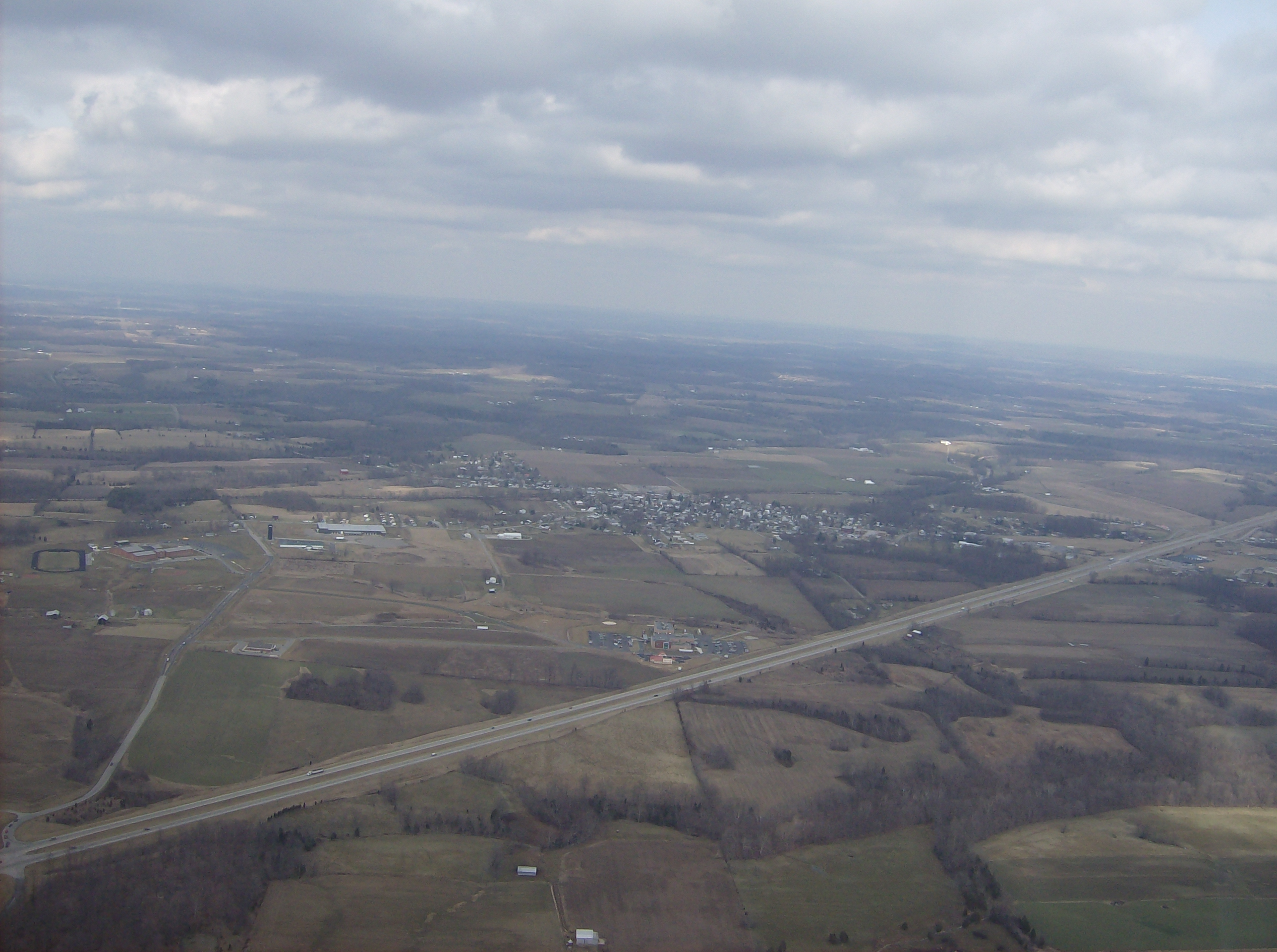
Aerial view of Seaman from the south.

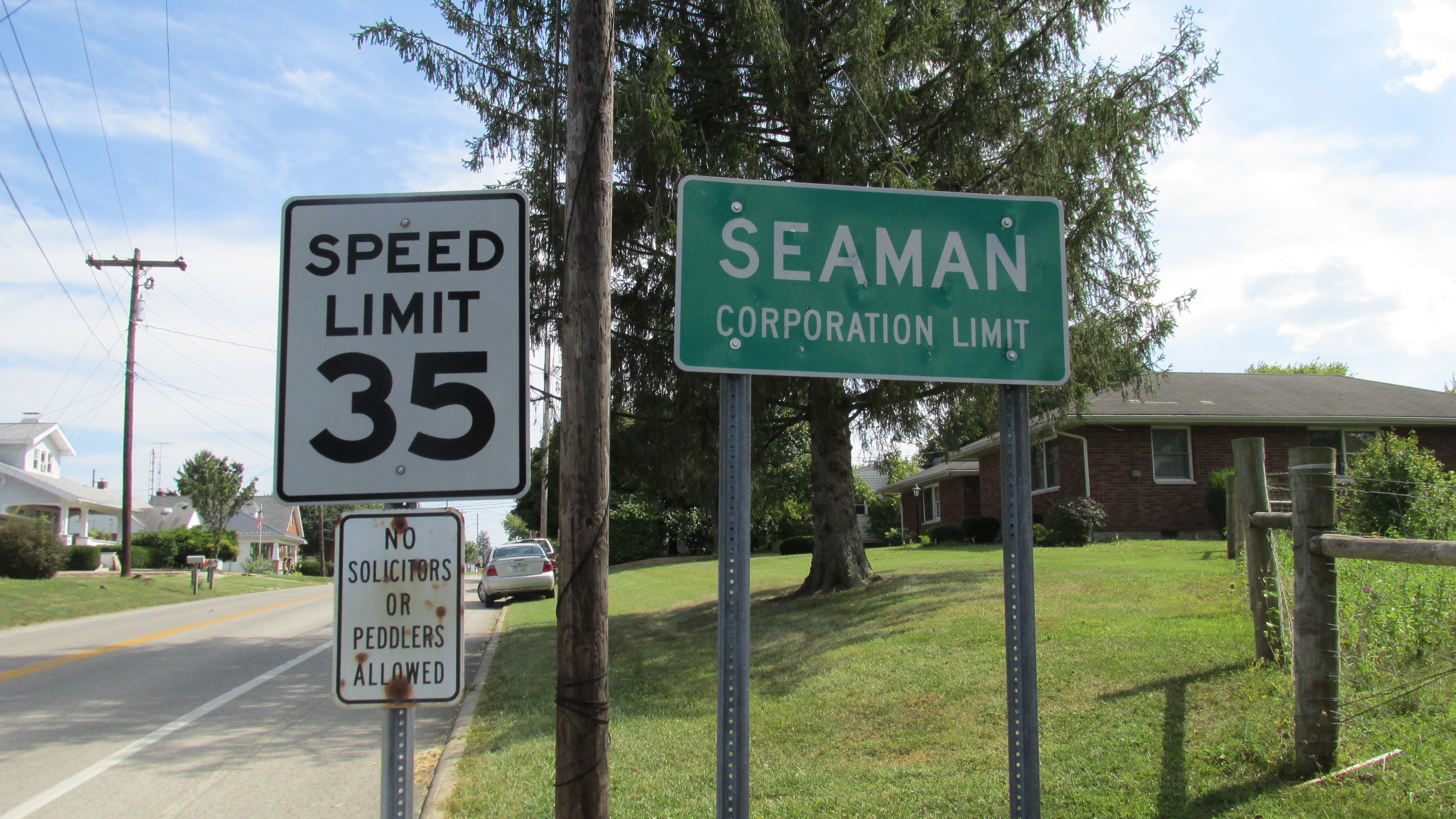
Seaman corporation limit sign.

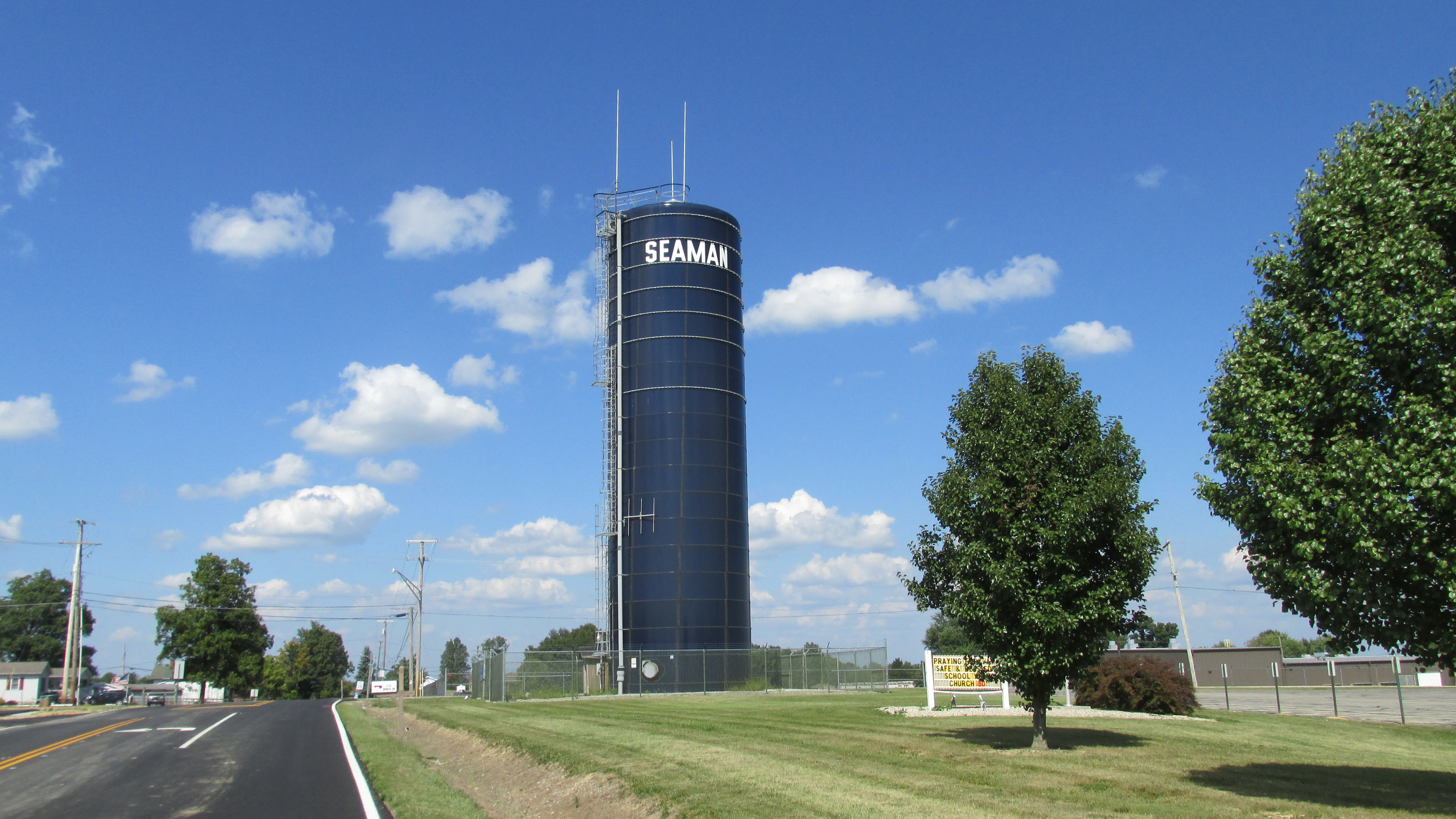
Water tower in Seaman.

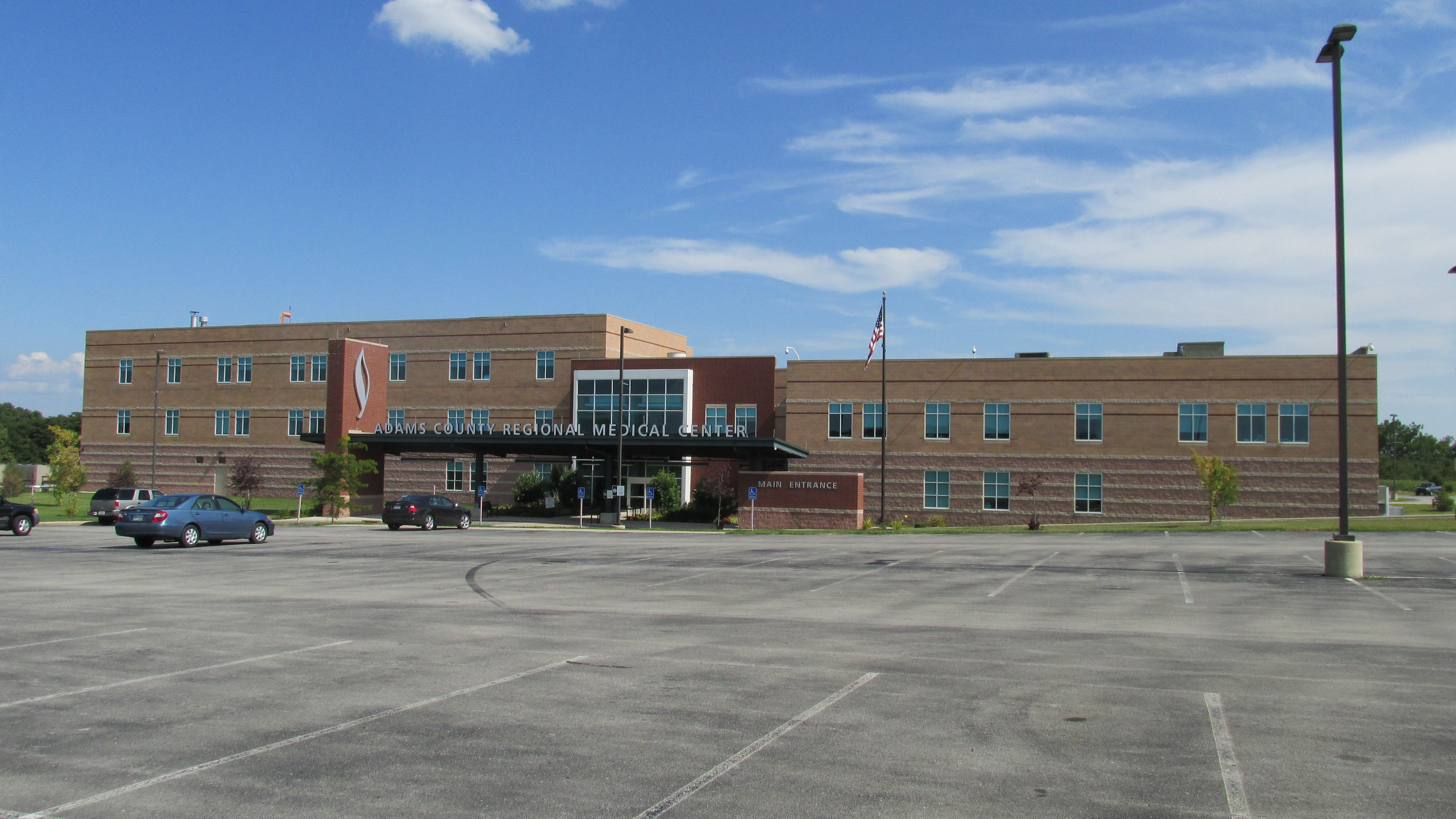
Adams County Regional Medical Center.

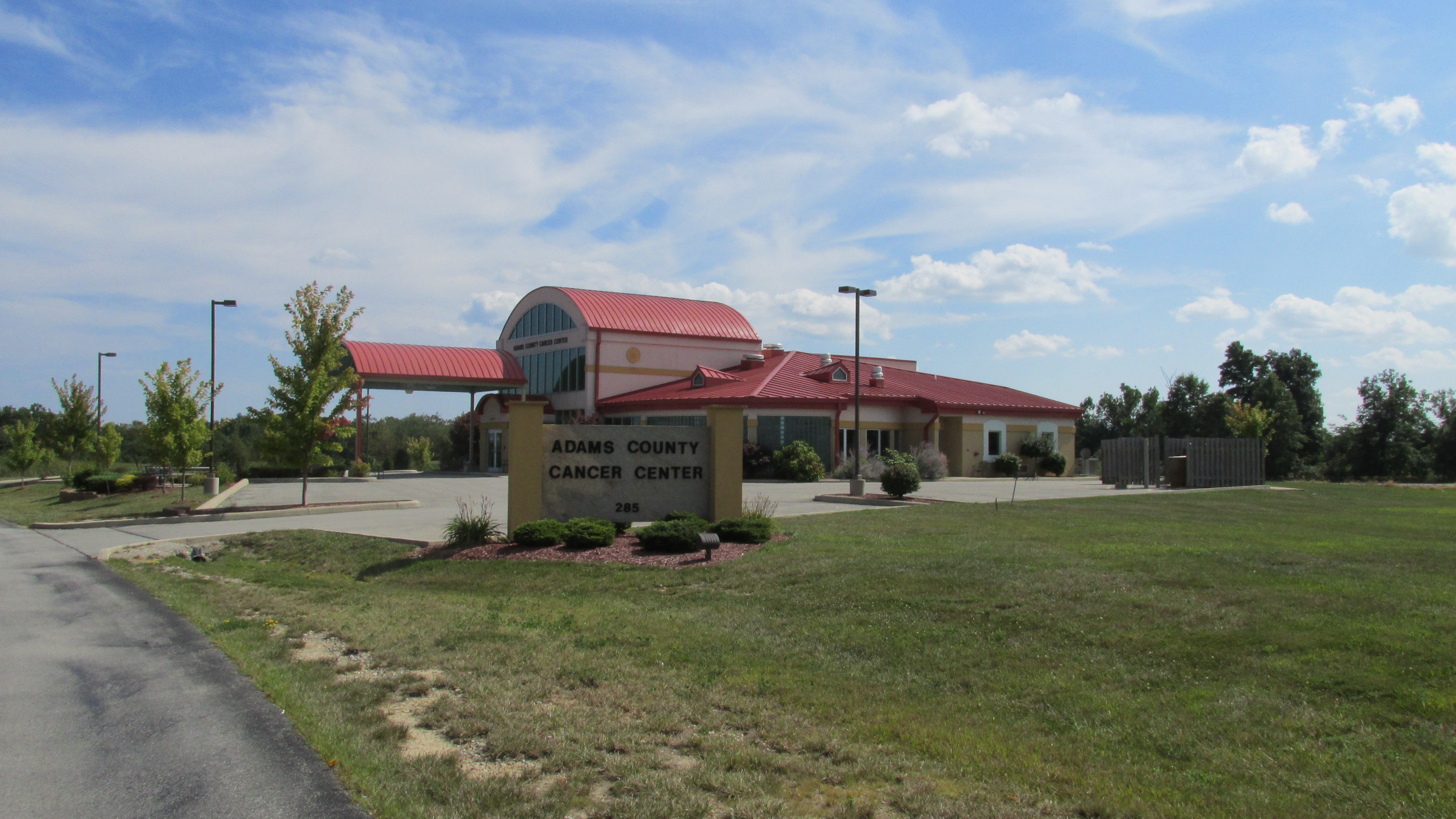
Adams County Cancer Center.
