= West Union High School (Ohio) =

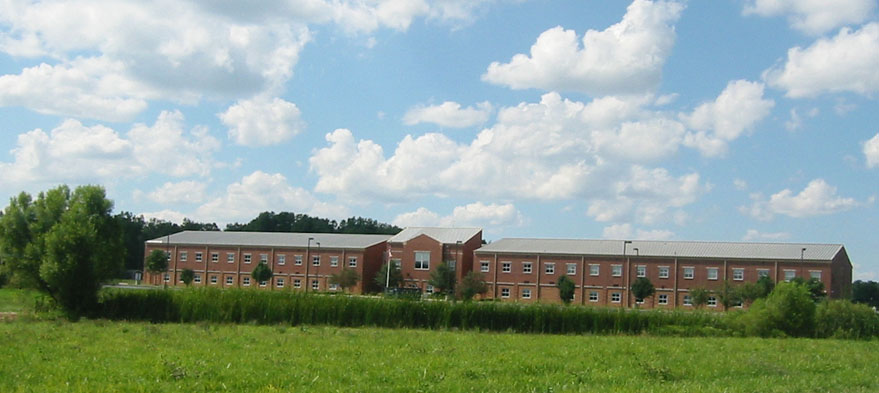

Location
- 97 Dragon Lair Drive; West Union, (Adams County), Ohio 45693; United States
- Coordinates: 38°48′52″N 83°35′0″W

Information
- Type: Public High School
- School district: Adams County/Ohio Valley School District
- Principal: Michael Roades
- Teaching staff: 45
- Grades: 7–12
- Colors: Teal, white, and Gold
- Mascot: Dragon
- Team name: Dragons
- Accreditation: North Central Association of Colleges and Schools
- Endowment: 520
- Website: https://www.ovsd.us/o/wuhs

West Union High School is a public high school located just outside West Union, Ohio. It is one of three high schools in the Adams County/Ohio Valley School District, the other two being North Adams High School and Peebles High School. All three schools are nearly identical in design. The district also has a vocational school (Ohio Valley Career and Technical Center).

== Background ==
The current West Union High School building was completed in August 1997, along with three other public high schools in Adams County, North Adams, Peebles, and Manchester High School. All four schools used the same layout and appear almost identical from the air.

== Controversy ==
The four regular public high schools in Adams County were built at the same time and all four featured a large granite tablet outside the school carved with the Ten Commandments. They were relocated after a lengthy four-year legal battle over the placement of the tablets on public property.

== Athletics ==
The school's mascot is the Dragon. See also Ohio High School Athletic Association and Ohio High School Athletic Conferences

== Notable alumni ==
- Dave Tomlin, former MLB player and current professional baseball coach and manager
