= Peebles, Ohio =

- Village
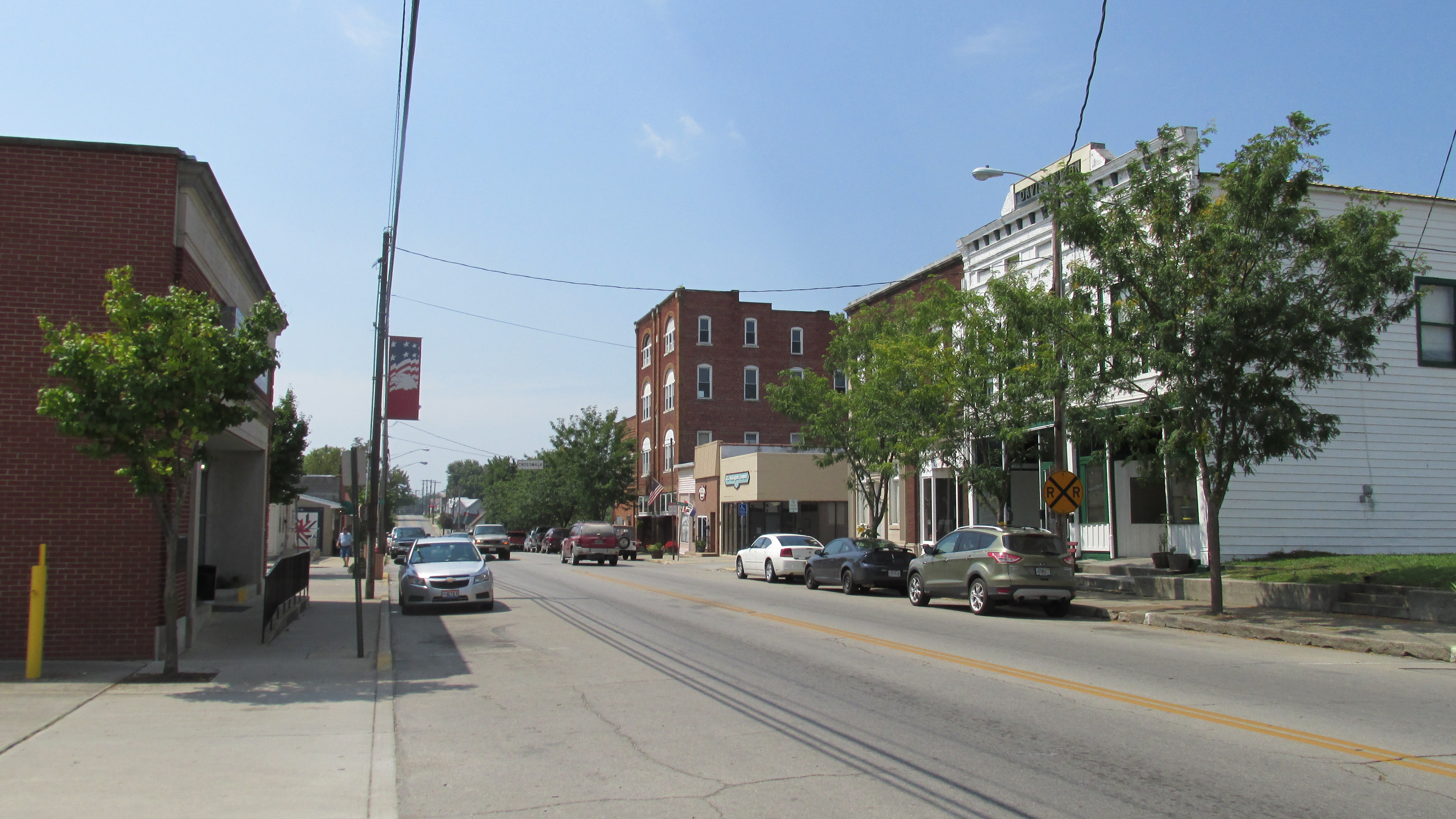
- Looking south on Main Street (Ohio State Route 41)

- Seal

- Location in Adams County and the state of Ohio.
- Coordinates: 38°56′47″N 83°24′34″W
- Country: United States
- State: Ohio
- County: Adams
- Township: Meigs
- Founded: 1881
- Incorporated: 1886
- Named for: John G. Peebles

Government
  - Mayor: Stephanie Harper

Area
  - Total: 1.21 sq mi (3.14 km^{2})
  - Land: 1.21 sq mi (3.14 km^{2})
  - Water: 0 sq mi (0.00 km^{2})
- Elevation: 820 ft (250 m)

Population (2020)
  - Total: 1,774
  - Estimate (2024): 1,760
  - Density: 1,461.0/sq mi (564.11/km^{2})
- Time zone: UTC-5 (Eastern (EST))
  - Summer (DST): UTC-4 (EDT)
- ZIP code: 45660
- Area codes: 937, 326
- FIPS code: 39-61420
- GNIS feature ID: 2399644

Peebles is a village in Adams County, Ohio, United States. It is 64 miles (103 km) east of Cincinnati. The population was 1,774 at the 2020 census.

== History ==
Peebles was founded in 1881 with the building of the railroad through that territory. It was named for John G. Peebles, who was instrumental in bringing the railroad to the settlement. That railroad was the Cincinnati & Eastern Railroad, today the Cincinnati Eastern Railroad (CCET).

In 1886, Peebles was officially incorporated as a village.

== Geography ==
According to the United States Census Bureau, the village has a total area of 1.18 square miles (3.06 km^{2}), all land.

== Demographics ==
Historical population
| Census | Pop. | Note | %± |
|---|---|---|---|
| 1890 | 358 | | — |
| 1900 | 763 | | 113.1% |
| 1910 | 921 | | 20.7% |
| 1920 | 1,008 | | 9.4% |
| 1930 | 1,235 | | 22.5% |
| 1940 | 1,356 | | 9.8% |
| 1950 | 1,498 | | 10.5% |
| 1960 | 1,601 | | 6.9% |
| 1970 | 1,629 | | 1.7% |
| 1980 | 1,790 | | 9.9% |
| 1990 | 1,782 | | −0.4% |
| 2000 | 1,739 | | −2.4% |
| 2010 | 1,782 | | 2.5% |
| 2020 | 1,774 | | −0.4% |
U.S. Decennial Census

The village's estimated median household income was $19,058 in 2009, and the median income for a family was $30,390. The village's per capita income was $13,739. About 27.1% of residents of the village were below the poverty line, including 26.3% for White residents, 100% for African American residents, 0% for Hispanic and Latino residents, 100% for Native American residents, and 37.6% of residents of two or more races.

=== 2010 census ===
As of the census of 2010, 1,782 people, 758 households, and 456 families resided in the village. The population density was 1,469 inhabitants per square mile (567/km^{2}). There were 867 housing units at an average density of 722.5 per square mile (279.0/km^{2}). The racial makeup of the village was 96.6% White, 0.3% African American, 0.4% Native American, 0.06% Asian, 0.1% from other races, and 1.0% from two or more races. Hispanic or Latino of any race were 1.5% of the population.

There were 758 households, of which 35.09% had children under the age of 18 living with them, 44.4% were married couples living together, 13.0% had a female householder with no husband present, and 35.3% were non-families. 31.8% of all households were made up of individuals, and 15.5% had someone living alone who was 65 years of age or older. The average household size was 2.43 and the average family size was 3.04.

As of the census of 2010 the population by age was 27.5% under the age of 18, 72.5% of the age 18 & over, 5.84% of the age 20 to 24, 11.22% of the age 25 to 34, 19.36% of the age 35 to 49, 17.56% of the age 50 to 64, 14.7% of the age 65 & over. There were 839 males and 943 females.

== Education ==
Peebles is served by Peebles High School and Peebles Elementary School, and the Peebles Public Library, a branch of the Adams County Public Library.

The Peebles High School student enrollment for 2009-2010: 490. Female enrollment: 243. Male enrollment: 247.

The Peebles Elementary School student enrollment for 2009-2010: 633. Female enrollment: 311. Male enrollment: 322.

== Notable people ==
- Tom Blackburn, basketball coach at the University of Dayton
- Samantha Hunt, author
- Edmund Wittenmyer, U.S. Army major general

== Gallery ==
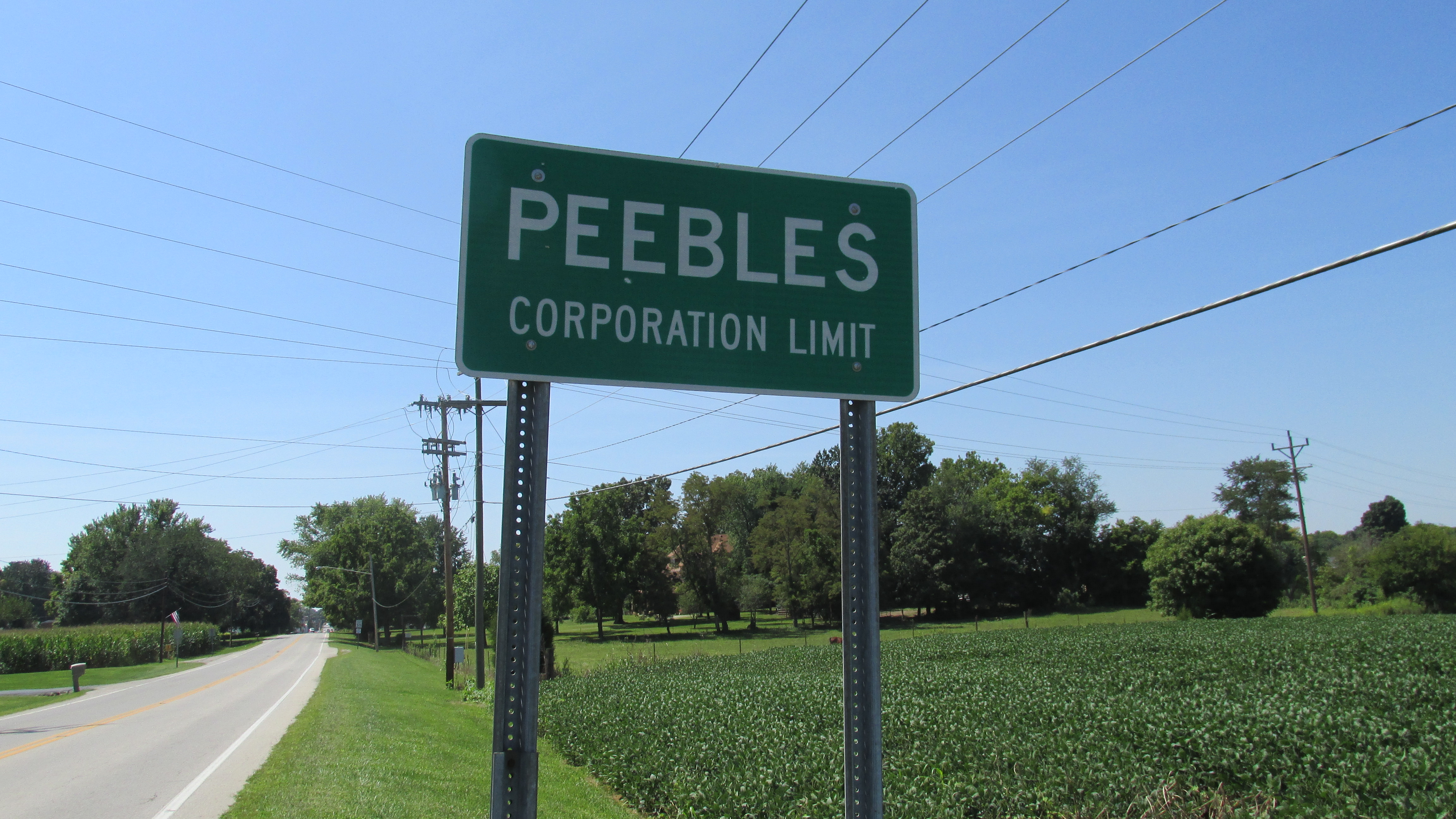
Peebles corporation limit sign.

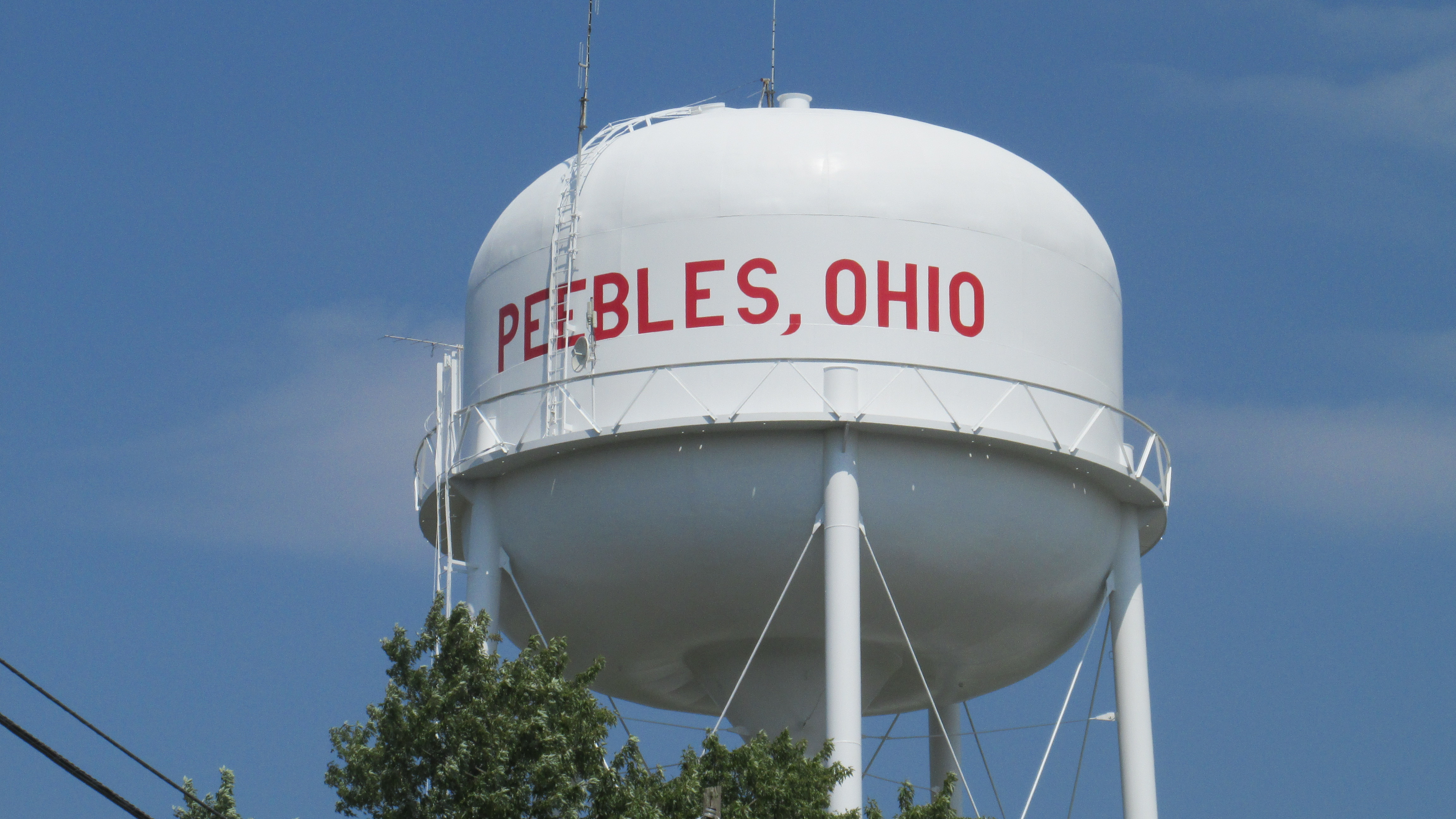
Water tower in Peebles.

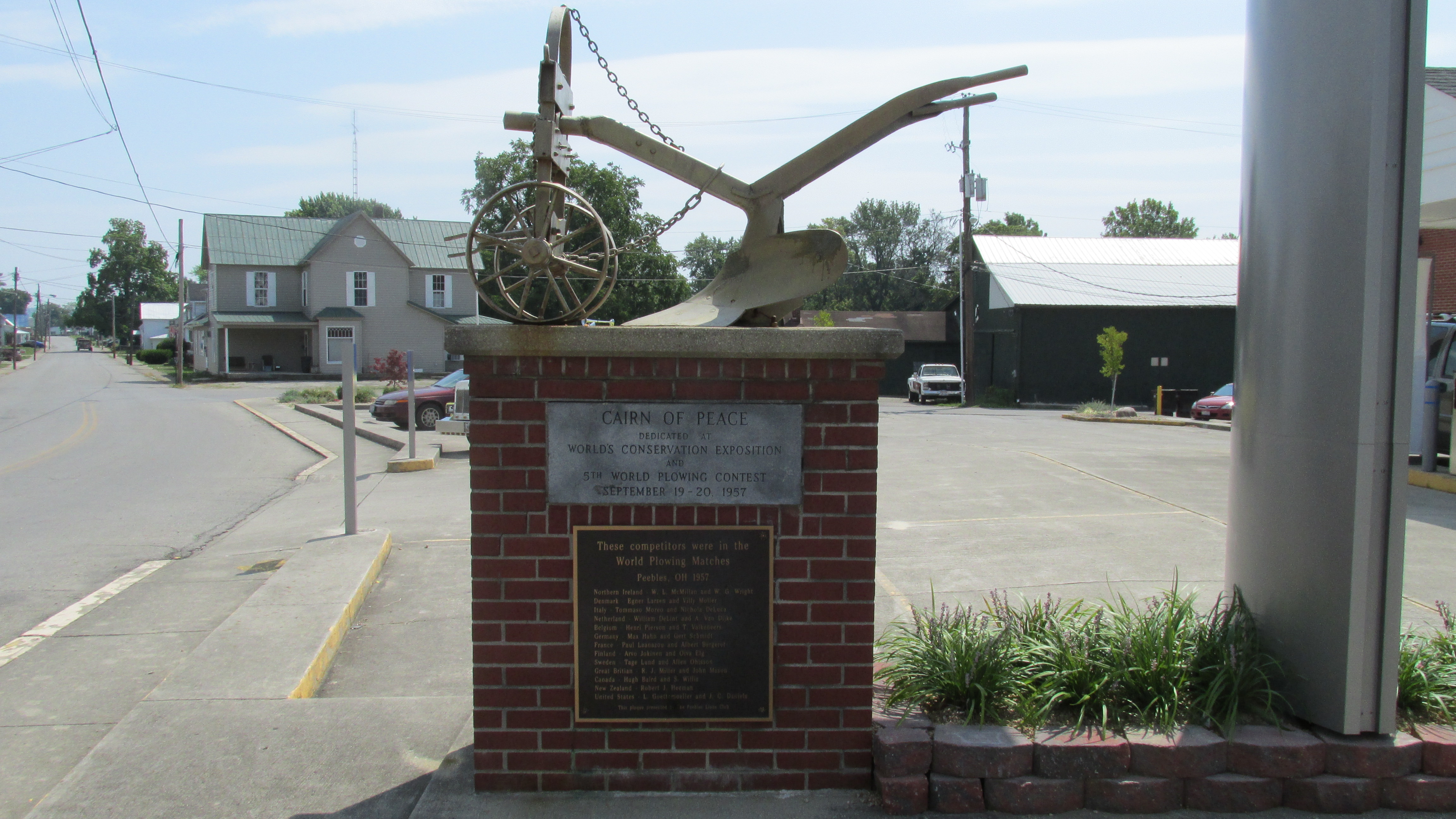
1957 Cairn of Peace located on the corner of Main and Elm Streets in Peebles.

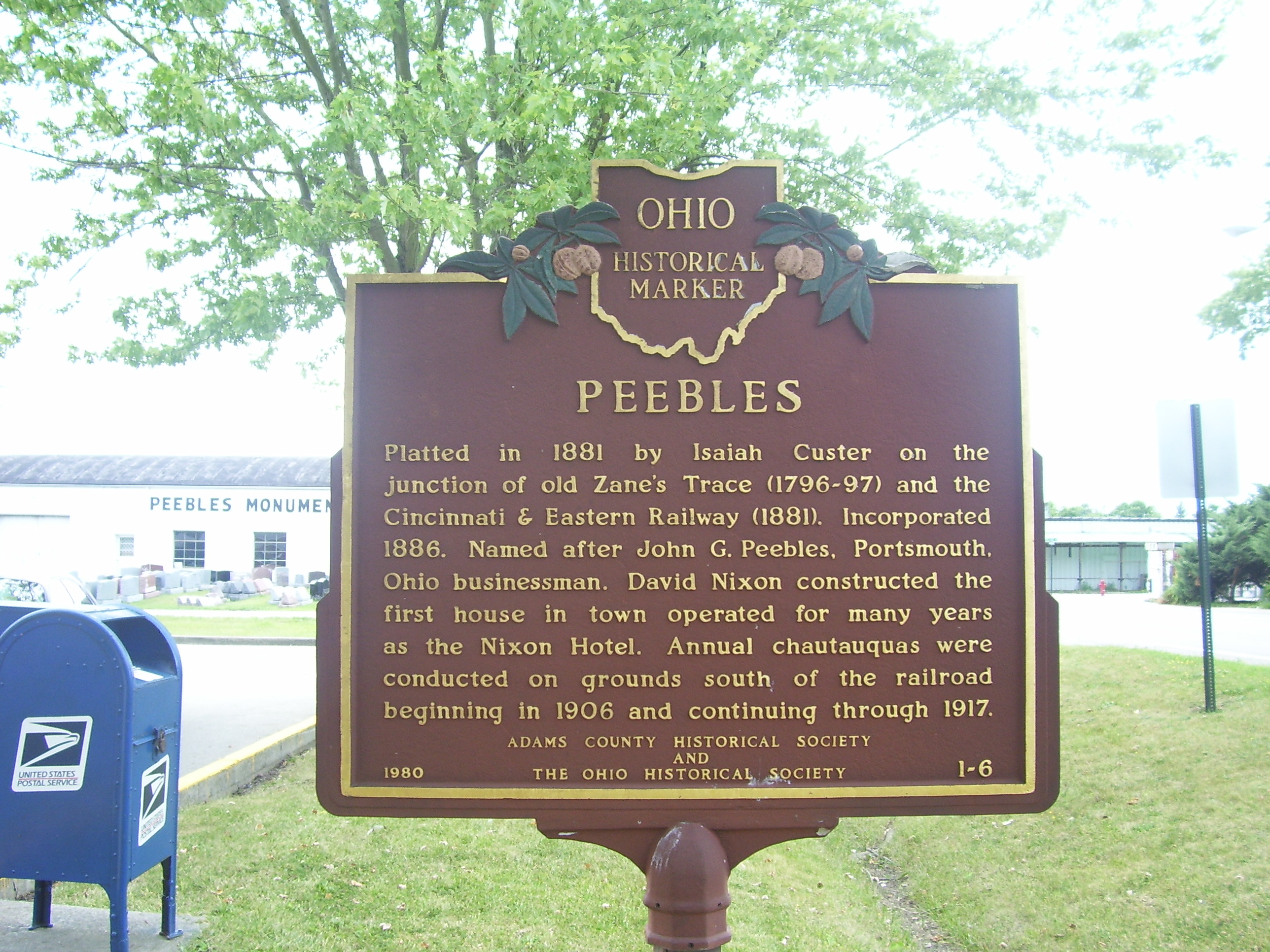
Peebles Ohio Historical Marker outlining the history of Peebles.

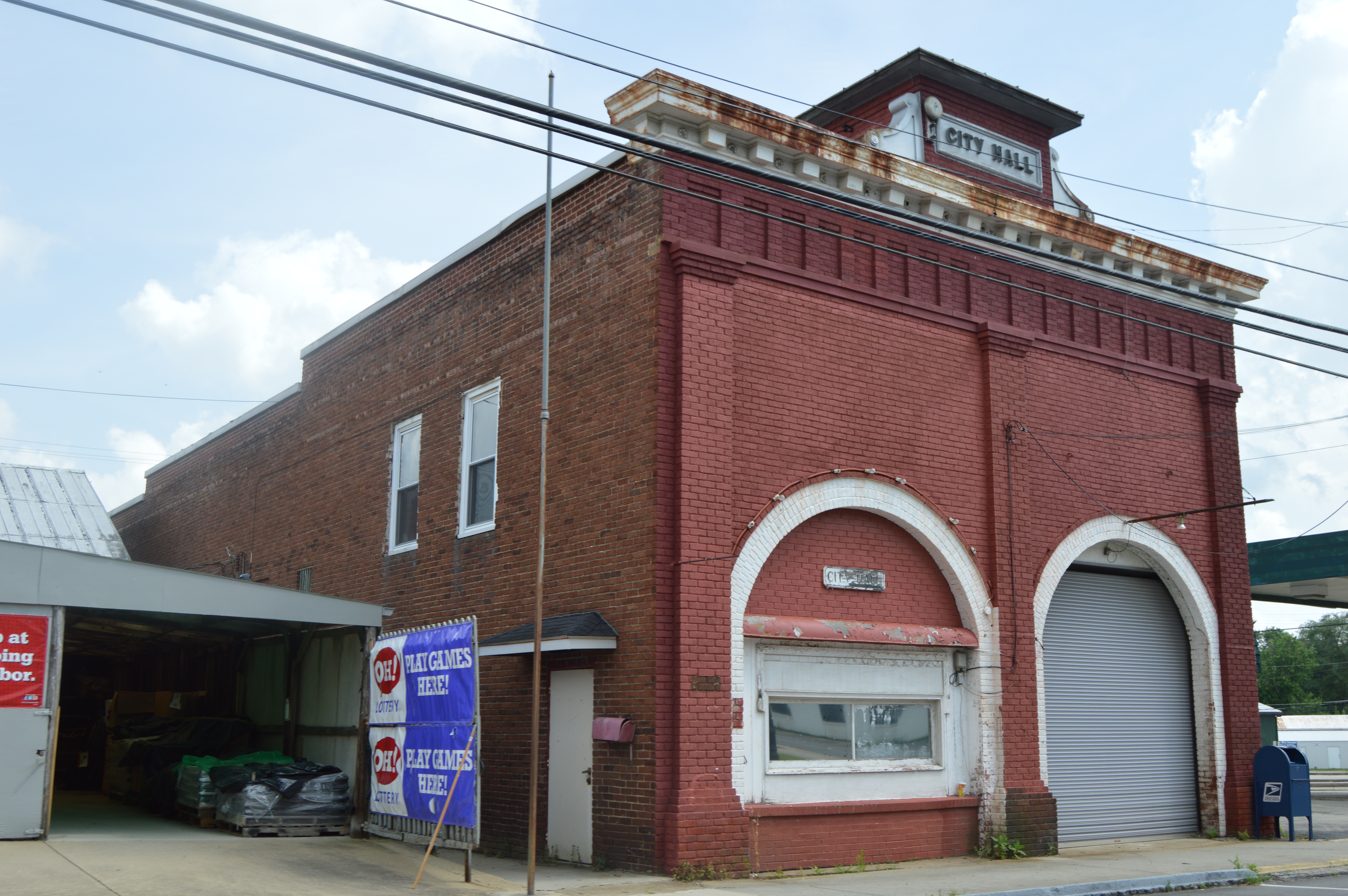
Peebles Village Hall
