= Ohio State Route 136 =

State highway in southwestern Ohio, US

State Route 136

Route information
- Maintained by ODOT
- Length: 32.41 mi (52.16 km)
- Existed: 1923–present

Major junctions
- South end: US 52 in Manchester
- North end: US 62 near Winchester

Location
- Country: United States
- State: Ohio
- Counties: Adams, Highland

Highway system
- Ohio State Highway System; Interstate; US; State; Scenic
← SR 135	→ SR 137

State Route 136 (SR 136) is a north–south state highway in the southwestern portion of the U.S. state of Ohio. Its southern terminus is at its interchange with U.S. Route 52 in Manchester and its northern terminus is at its interchange with U.S. Route 62 near Winchester.

== History ==
SR 136 was commissioned in 1923, between SR 125 and SR 38, now US 62. The route was extended south to Manchester, in 1930.

== Major intersections ==
County	Location	mi	km	Destinations	Notes
Adams	Manchester	0.00	0.00	US 52	Southern terminus of SR 136
Adams	Bentonville	4.35	7.00	SR 41 south	Southern end of SR 41 concurrency
Adams	Liberty Township	5.89	9.48	SR 41 north	Northern end of SR 41 concurrency
Adams	Liberty Township	9.40	15.13	SR 125	
Adams	Cherry Fork	14.90	23.98	SR 137 north	Southern terminus of SR 137
Adams	Winchester	18.99	30.56	SR 32	
Highland	New Market Township	32.41	52.16	US 62	Northern terminus of SR 136
1.000 mi = 1.609 km; 1.000 km = 0.621 mi: Concurrency terminus
