= Cherry Fork, Ohio =

- Unincorporated community and Census-designated place
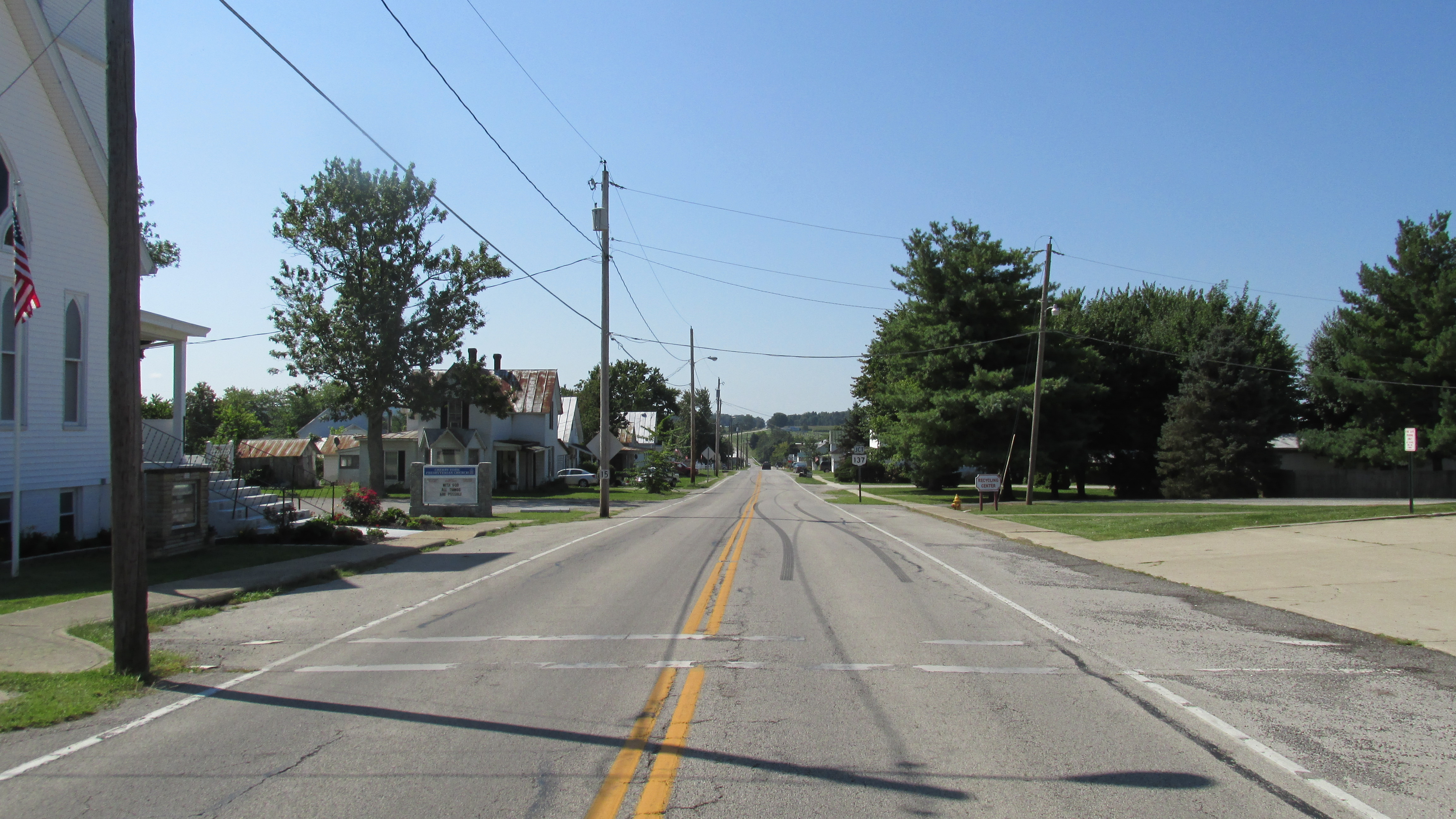
- Southbound on State Route 136

- Location in Adams County and the state of Ohio.
- Coordinates: 38°53′14″N 83°36′45″W
- Country: United States
- State: Ohio
- County: Adams
- Township: Wayne

Area
  - Total: 0.30 sq mi (0.78 km^{2})
  - Land: 0.30 sq mi (0.78 km^{2})
  - Water: 0 sq mi (0.00 km^{2})
- Elevation: 892 ft (272 m)

Population (2020)
  - Total: 170
  - Density: 563.0/sq mi (217.36/km^{2})
- Time zone: UTC-5 (Eastern (EST))
  - Summer (DST): UTC-4 (EDT)
- ZIP code: 45618
- Area codes: 937, 326
- FIPS code: 39-13834
- GNIS feature ID: 2785006

Cherry Fork is an unincorporated community and former village in Wayne Township, Adams County, Ohio, United States. The population was 170 at the 2020 census. In 2014, voters chose to disincorporate the village.

== History ==
Cherry Fork was originally called North Liberty, and under the latter name was laid out in 1848. The present name comes from Cherry Fork, a stream near the town site.

== Geography ==
According to the United States Census Bureau, the village has an area of 0.12 square miles (0.31 km^{2}), all land.

== Demographics ==
Historical population
Census	Pop.	Note	%±
1930	195		—
1940	219		12.3%
1950	197		−10.0%
1960	185		−6.1%
1970	176		−4.9%
1980	210		19.3%
1990	178		−15.2%
2000	127		−28.7%
2010	155		22.0%
2020	170		9.7%
U.S. Decennial Census

=== 2010 census ===
As of the census of 2010, 155 people, 64 households, and 38 families resided in the village. The population density was 1,291.7 inhabitants per square mile (498.7/km^{2}). There were 75 housing units at an average density of 625.0 per square mile (241.3/km^{2}). The racial makeup of the village was 96.8% White, 0.6% African American, 0.6% Native American, and 1.9% from two or more races. Hispanic or Latino of any race were 0.6% of the population.

There were 64 households, of which 35.9% had children under the age of 18 living with them, 39.1% were married couples living together, 15.6% had a female householder with no husband present, 4.7% had a male householder with no wife present, and 40.6% were non-families. 31.3% of all households were made up of individuals, and 6.3% had someone living alone who was 65 years of age or older. The average household size was 2.42 and the average family size was 3.05.

The median age in the village was 36.7 years. 29% of residents were under the age of 18; 3.9% were between the ages of 18 and 24; 30.4% were from 25 to 44; 26.5% were from 45 to 64; and 10.3% were 65 years of age or older. The gender makeup of the village was 54.2% male and 45.8% female.

=== 2000 census ===
As of the census of 2000, 127 people, 48 households, and 36 families resided in the village. The population density was 1,040.2 inhabitants per square mile (401.6/km^{2}). There were 54 housing units at an average density of 442.3 per square mile (170.8/km^{2}). The racial makeup of the village was 100.00% White.

There were 48 households, out of which 37.5% had children under the age of 18 living with them, 45.8% were married couples living together, 18.8% had a female householder with no husband present, and 25.0% were non-families. 22.9% of all households were made up of individuals, and 6.3% had someone living alone who was 65 years of age or older. The average household size was 2.65 and the average family size was 3.00.

In the village the population was spread out, with 31.5% under the age of 18, 9.4% from 18 to 24, 32.3% from 25 to 44, 19.7% from 45 to 64, and 7.1% who were 65 years of age or older. The median age was 28 years. For every 100 females, there were 95.4 males. For every 100 females age 18 and over, there were 85.1 males.

The median income for a household in the village was $24,821, and the median income for a family was $24,821. Males had a median income of $23,750 versus $26,250 for females. The per capita income for the village was $10,568. There were 23.3% of families and 26.7% of the population living below the poverty line, including 37.5% of under eighteens and none of those over 64.
