= West Union, Ohio =

- Village
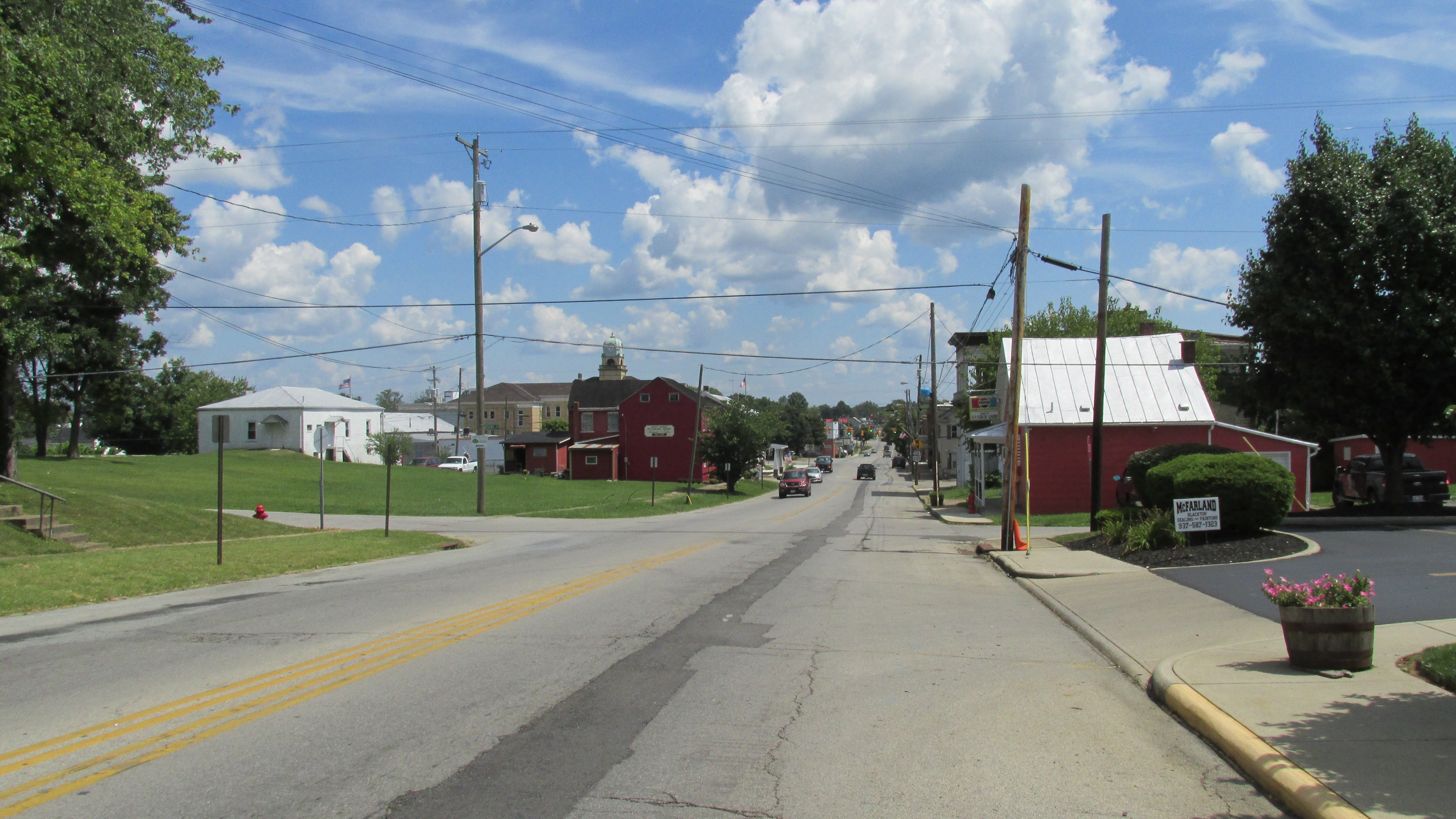
- Looking east on Main Street

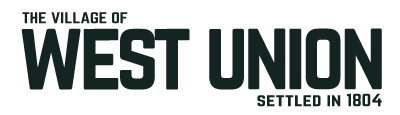
- Header
- Interactive map of West Union, Ohio
- Location within Ohio Location within the United States
- Coordinates: 38°47′30″N 83°32′39″W
- Country: United States
- State: Ohio
- County: Adams
- Townships: Tiffin, Liberty
- Founded: 1803
- Incorporated: 1859

Government
  - Mayor: Jason Buda

Area
  - Total: 2.83 sq mi (7.33 km^{2})
  - Land: 2.83 sq mi (7.33 km^{2})
  - Water: 0 sq mi (0.00 km^{2})
- Elevation: 873 ft (266 m)

Population (2020)
  - Total: 3,004
  - Estimate (2024): 3,088
  - Density: 1,061.1/sq mi (409.71/km^{2})
- Time zone: UTC-5 (Eastern (EST))
  - Summer (DST): UTC-4 (EDT)
- ZIP code: 45693
- Area codes: 937, 326
- FIPS code: 39-84294
- GNIS feature ID: 2400146
- Website: www.westunionoh.net

West Union is a village in Tiffin and Liberty townships, Adams County, Ohio, United States, about 55 miles (89 km) southeast of Cincinnati. The population was 3,004 at the 2020 census. It is the county seat of Adams County. West Union is served by West Union High School, the Adams County/Ohio Valley School District, and the West Union Public Library, a branch of the Adams County Public Library.

== History ==
West Union was laid out in 1803. A post office called West Union has been in operation since 1805. The village was incorporated in 1859.

== Geography ==
According to the United States Census Bureau, the village has a total area of 2.83 square miles (7.33 km^{2}), all land.

State Routes 41, 125, and 247 all intersect and run concurrently through the downtown area.

Ironically, West Union lies east of Union, Ohio, a city in Montgomery County. West Union and Union are not adjacent to each other, actually being approximately 120 miles from each other.

== Demographics ==
Historical population
Census	Pop.	Note	%±
1810	229		—
1820	406		77.3%
1830	429		5.7%
1840	462		7.7%
1850	444		−3.9%
1860	450		1.4%
1870	486		8.0%
1880	626		28.8%
1890	825		31.8%
1900	1,033		25.2%
1910	1,080		4.5%
1920	992		−8.1%
1930	1,094		10.3%
1940	1,334		21.9%
1950	1,508		13.0%
1960	1,762		16.8%
1970	1,951		10.7%
1980	2,791		43.1%
1990	3,096		10.9%
2000	2,903		−6.2%
2010	3,241		11.6%
2020	3,004		−7.3%
U.S. Decennial Census

=== 2020 census ===
As of the 2020 census, West Union had a population of 3,004. The median age was 43.8 years. 21.0% of residents were under the age of 18 and 23.1% of residents were 65 years of age or older. For every 100 females there were 85.1 males, and for every 100 females age 18 and over there were 79.5 males age 18 and over.

0.0% of residents lived in urban areas, while 100.0% lived in rural areas.

There were 1,283 households in West Union, of which 26.0% had children under the age of 18 living in them. Of all households, 32.7% were married-couple households, 19.5% were households with a male householder and no spouse or partner present, and 38.3% were households with a female householder and no spouse or partner present. About 39.0% of all households were made up of individuals and 18.3% had someone living alone who was 65 years of age or older.

There were 1,486 housing units, of which 13.7% were vacant. The homeowner vacancy rate was 2.8% and the rental vacancy rate was 9.7%.

Racial composition as of the 2020 census
Race	Number	Percent
White	2,901	96.6%
Black or African American	14	0.5%
American Indian and Alaska Native	9	0.3%
Asian	4	0.1%
Native Hawaiian and Other Pacific Islander	0	0.0%
Some other race	11	0.4%
Two or more races	65	2.2%
Hispanic or Latino (of any race)	33	1.1%

=== 2010 census ===
As of the census 3,421, 1,322 households, and 420 families living in the village. The population density was 1,145.2 inhabitants per square mile (442.2/km^{2}). There were 1,493 housing units at an average density of 527.6 per square mile (203.7/km^{2}). The racial makeup of the village was 97.4% White, 0.4% African American, 0.2% Native American, 0.2% Asian, 0.3% from other races, and 1.5% from two or more races. Hispanic or Latino of any race were 0.8% of the population.

There were 1,322 households, of which 32.4% had children under the age of 18 living with them, 38.5% were married couples living together, 17.6% had a female householder with no husband present, 4.8% had a male householder with no wife present, and 39.1% were non-families. 35.1% of all households were made up of individuals, and 16.5% had someone living alone who was 65 years of age or older. The average household size was 2.29 and the average family size was 2.91.

The median age in the village was 40.1 years. 23.4% of residents were under the age of 18; 9% were between the ages of 18 and 24; 22.8% were from 25 to 44; 24.5% were from 45 to 64, and 20.2% were 65 years of age or older. The gender makeup of the village was 45.5% male and 54.5% female.

=== 2000 census ===
As of the census of 2000, there were 2,903 people, 1,242 households, and 757 families living in the village. The population density was 1,130.4 inhabitants per square mile (436.4/km^{2}). There were 13 housing units at an average density of 534.6 per square mile (206.4/km^{2}). The racial makeup of the village was 98.11% White, 0.24% African American, 0.002% Native American, 0.10% Asian, 0.07% Pacific Islander, 0.10% from other races, and 0.65% from two or more races. Hispanic or Latino of any race were 0.45% of the population.

There were 1,242 households, out of which 28.4% had children under the age of 18 living with them, 40.7% were married couples living together, 16.5% had a female householder with no husband present, and 39.0% were non-families. 35.5% of all households were made up of individuals, and 18.2% had someone living alone who was 65 years of age or older. The average household size was 2.20 and the average family size was 2.81.

In the village, the population was spread out, with 22.0% under the age of 18, 9.8% from 18 to 24, 25.2% from 25 to 44, 20.9% from 45 to 64, and 22.1% who were 65 years of age or older. The median age was 40 years. For every 100 females, there were 76.4 males. For every 100 females age 18 and over, there were 72.7 males.

The median income for a household in the village was $20,566, and the median income for a family was $25,531. Males had a median income of $25,104 versus $19,107 for females. The per capita income for the village was $13,302. About 15.8% of families and 21.8% of the population were below the poverty line, including 22.0% of those under age 18 and 12.1% of those age 65 or over.

== Notable people ==
- Edmund Wittenmyer, U.S. Army major general, taught school in West Union from 1876 to 1883
