= Peebles High School (Ohio) =

Public school in Peebles, Ohio, United States

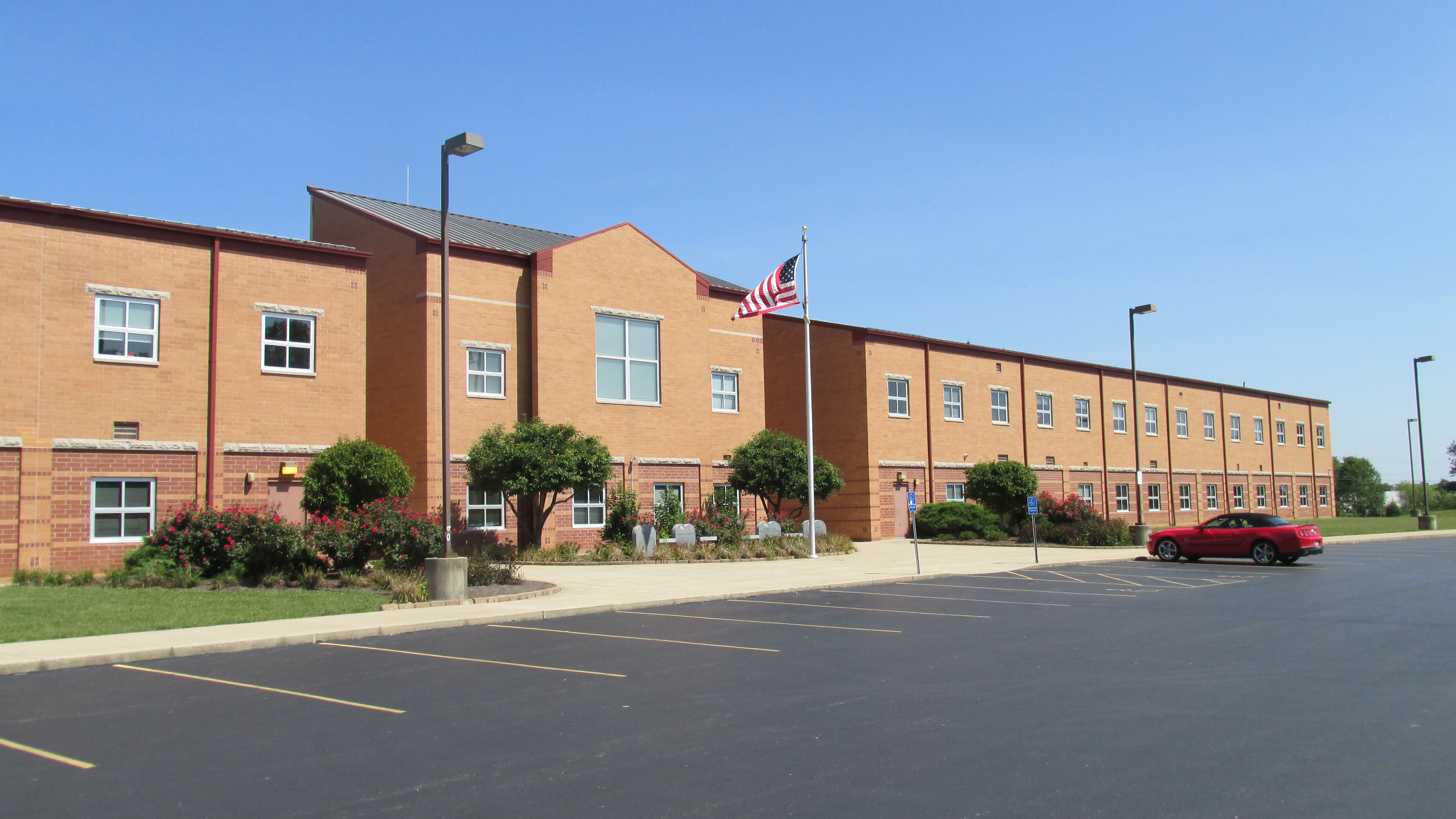

Location
- 25719 State Route 41; Peebles, (Adams County), Ohio 45660; United States
- Coordinates: 38°56′26″N 83°24′58″W

Information
- Motto: Altitude is Everything
- Status: Bronze Award Winner
- School district: Adams County Ohio Valley
- Superintendent: Richard Seas
- Principal: Steve Appleman
- Faculty: 30
- Teaching staff: 25.00 (FTE)
- Grades: 7–12
- Enrollment: 373 (2023–2024)
  - Grade 7: 73
  - Grade 8: 73
  - Grade 9: 78
  - Grade 10: 84
  - Grade 11: 25
  - Grade 12: 40
- Student to teacher ratio: 14.92
- Colors: Red, White & Blue
- Fight song: “Onward Peebles”
- Athletics conference: Southern Hills Athletic Conference
- Mascot: Indian
- Team name: Indians
- Rival: North Adams High School
- USNWR ranking: D6
- Assistant Principal: Eric Hambrick
- Athletic Director: Josh Arey
- Basketball Head Coach: Josh Arey
- Website: https://www.ovsd.us/o/phs

Peebles High School is a public high school located in Peebles, Ohio. It is one of three high schools in the Adams County/Ohio Valley School District. The other county schools are North Adams and West Union. The district also has a vocational school (Ohio Valley Career and Technical Center).

== History of Peebles High School ==
Peebles High School was established in 1887. Peebles, Franklin, and Sinking Spring school districts were consolidated in 1968 and became a part of the Ohio Valley Local School District in 1970. In the history of Peebles High School four buildings have served the high school:

In 1887 a two-room, two-story wooden school building was erected near the intersection of Vine St. and Wendell Ave. and served as the first Peebles High School. A. C. Hood was the first superintendent and 75 pupils were enrolled. The first class of four (Florence Custer Nixon, Anna Platter Watts, D. W. Reynolds, and Grace Wickerham) graduated in 1891. There was no graduation in the following years: 1892, 1893, 1895, 1896, 1899, 1900, 1901, 1902, 1903, 1906, 1907, and 1908. This building was destroyed by a fire around 1910. Following that fire, a large red brick building was completed in 1913 at a cost of $24,000 and served first as the high school, then later as the elementary school. This building had 6 class rooms, an auditorium, small library, typing room, and office. Band, home economics, and agriculture were later added to the curriculum. The wooden-frame "old gym" was erected nearby in 1927. This building was raised in (year needed) Because of the rapidly expanding population, a new high school building, located on Simmons Avenue, was completed in 1952. This was built of yellow brick. A major addition was completed in February 1958 adding several classrooms to the West end of the main building. A single-story addition with four classrooms and two restrooms was added to the east end in 1974-75. In the early 1990s, a new Vo. Ag. classroom was added along with an elevator. In its last years as a high school, there were 28 classrooms, library, Vo. Ag. classroom and shop, industrial arts classroom and shop, home economics classroom and kitchen, art room, computer lab and gymnasium. At that time the building housed 550 students in grades 7-12. This building became an elementary school from 1997-2010, and was raised in August 2011. The present Jr/Sr high school building was completed in 1997.

== Controversy ==
The four regular public high schools in Adams County were built at the same time and all four featured a large granite tablet outside the school carved with the Ten Commandments. They were relocated after a lengthy four-year legal battle over the placement of the tablets on public property. In Peebles, the tablet now is located directly across the street facing the high school on the property of the Peebles Baptist Church.

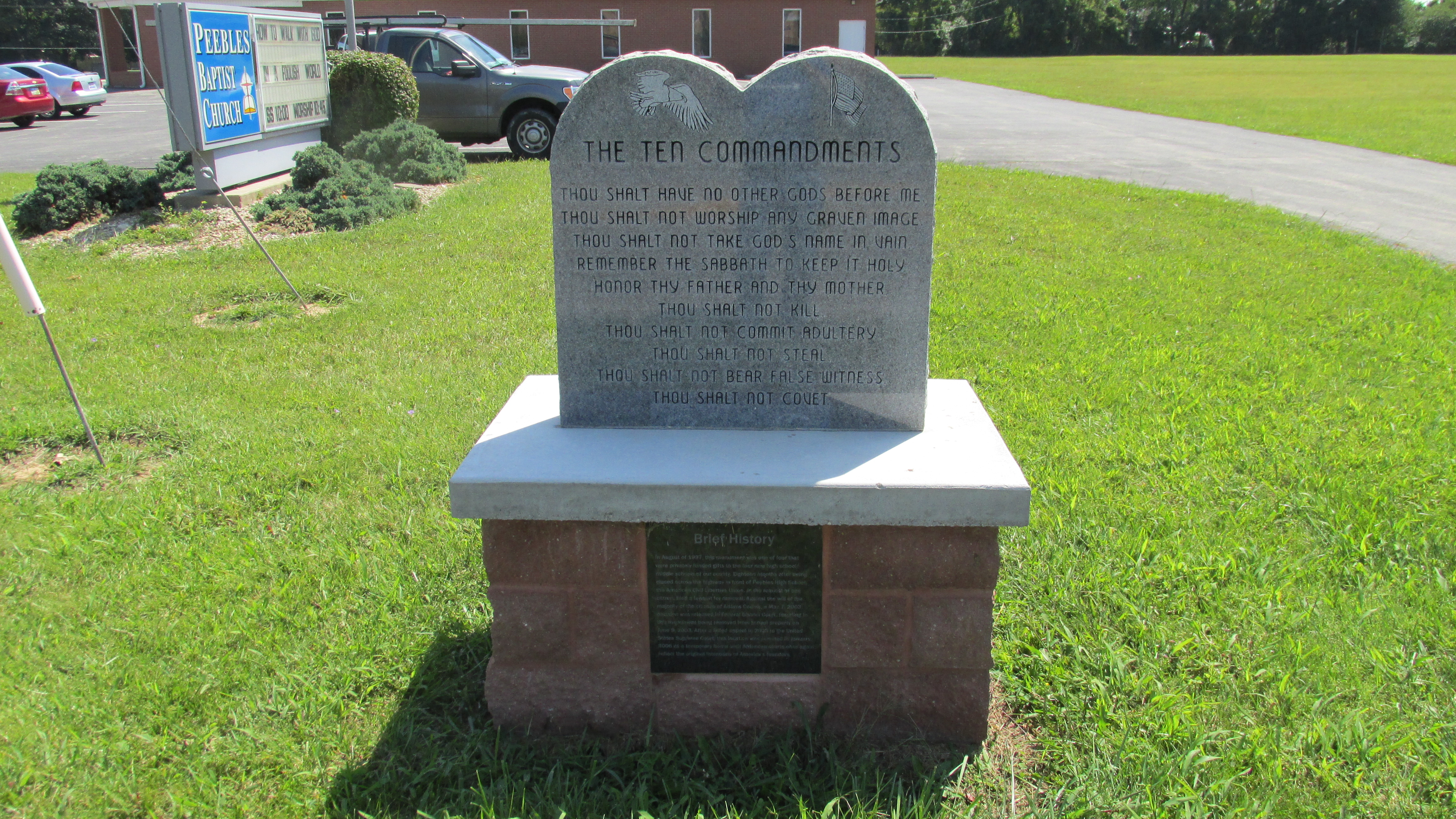
Ten Commandments tablet.

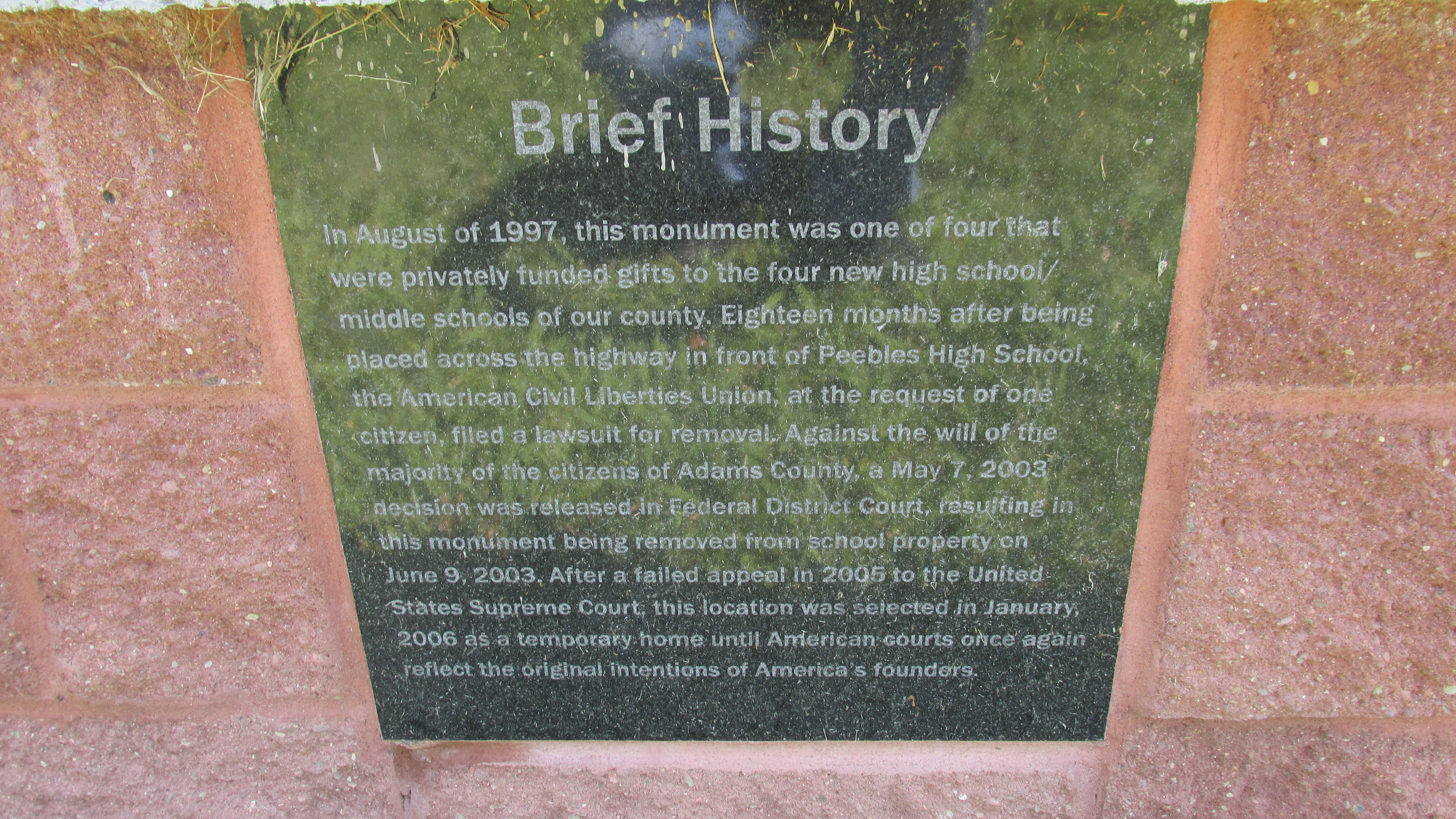
Ten Commandments tablet.

== Athletics ==
All Peebles teams are nicknamed "The Indians," because of the town's close proximity to the Serpent Mound.

The school has Jr. high and high school sports in soccer, cross country, golf, volleyball, baseball and basketball.
