= Fairfax, Highland County, Ohio =

Unincorporated community in Ohio, U.S.

Coordinates: 39°02′52″N 83°35′15″W

Fairfax is an unincorporated community in Highland County, in the U.S. state of Ohio.

== History ==
Fairfax was founded in the 1830s, and named after Fairfax, Virginia, the native home of a first settler. A post office called Fairfax was established in 1851, and remained in operation until 1906.
