= Adams County/Ohio Valley School District =

School district in Ohio, United States

Address
- 141 Lloyd Road West Union, Ohio, 45693; United States

District information
- Type: Public
- Grades: PK–12
- Schools: 7
- NCES District ID: 3906190

Students and staff
- Students: 3,435 (2025–2026)
- Teachers: 207.55 (on an FTE basis) (2025–2026)
- Staff: 481.00 (on an FTE basis) (2025–2026)
- Student–teacher ratio: 16.55 (2025–2026)

Other information
- Website: www.ovsd.us

Adams County/Ohio Valley School District is a public school district in Adams County, Ohio. It has a student population of 3,752 students. The superintendent is Richard Seas.

== Grades PK-6 ==
- North Adams Elementary School (2295 Moores Rd, Seaman)
- Peebles Elementary School (700 Peebles Indian Dr, Peebles)
- West Union Elementary School (555 Lloyd Rd, West Union)

== Grades 7-12 ==
- North Adams High School (96 Green Devil Dr, Seaman)
- Peebles High School (144 Peebles Indian Dr, Peebles)
- West Union High School (97 Dragon Lair Dr, West Union)

== Grades 11-12 ==
- Ohio Valley Career and Technical Center (175 Lloyd Rd, West Union)
