= Wrightsville, Adams County, Ohio =

Wrightsville, Ohio
- Unincorporated community
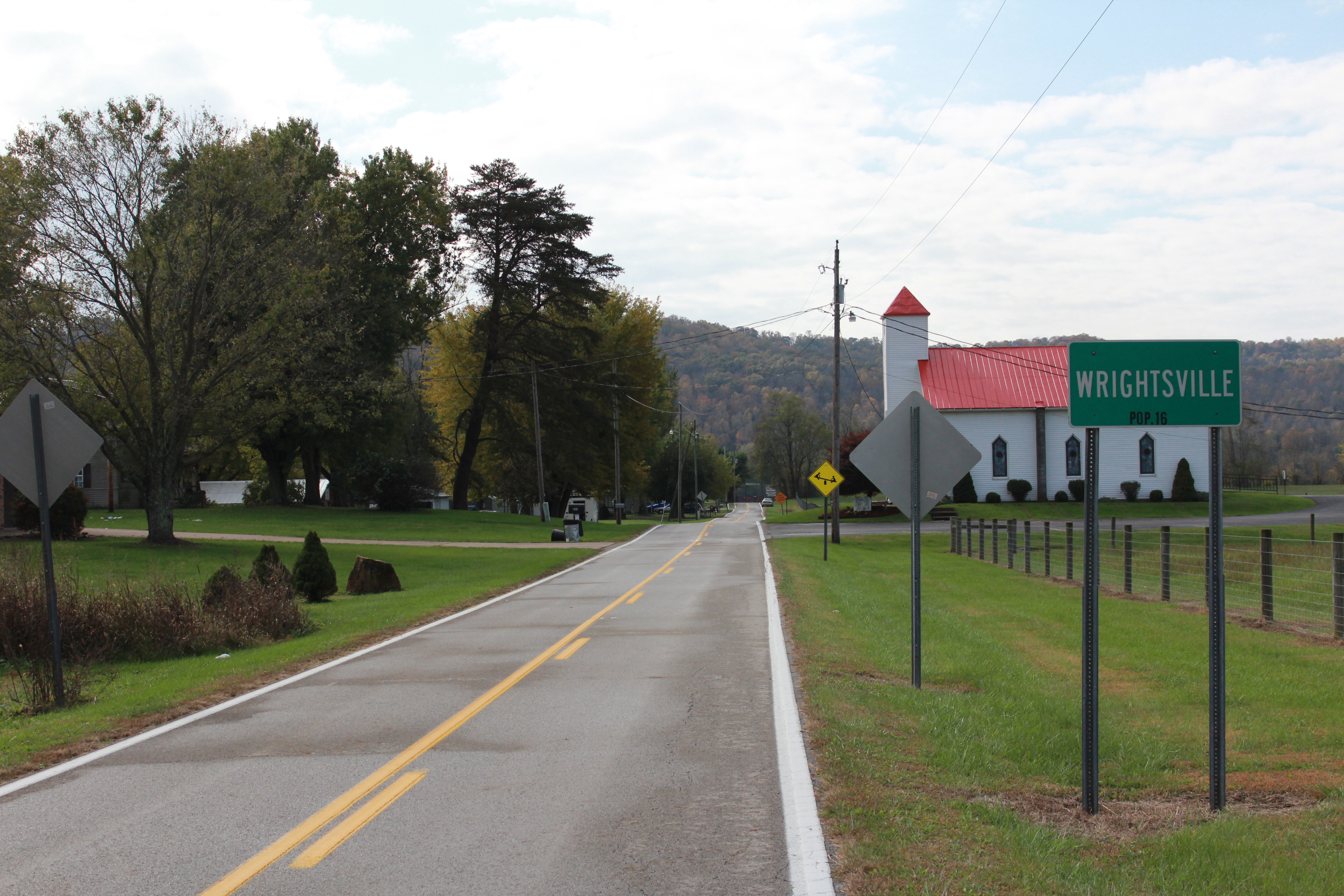
- Wrightsville community sign on Ohio State Route 247 South

- Location within Ohio
- Coordinates: 38°42′10″N 83°30′44″W
- Country: United States
- State: Ohio
- County: Adams
- Township: Monroe
- Time zone: UTC-5 (Eastern (EST))
  - Summer (DST): UTC-4 (EDT)
- ZIP codes: 45144 (Manchester)
- Area code: 937
- GNIS feature ID: 1061804

Wrightsville is an unincorporated community in Adams County, in the U.S. state of Ohio.

== History ==
Wrightsville was platted in 1847. The post office Wrightsville once contained was first called Mahala, then Vineyard Hill. The post office was established as Mahala in 1850, the name was changed to Vineyard Hill in 1857, and the post office closed in 1907.
