= National Register of Historic Places listings in Adams County, Ohio =

Location of Adams County in Ohio

This is a list of the National Register of Historic Places listings in Adams County, Ohio.

This is intended to be a complete list of the properties and districts on the National Register of Historic Places in Adams County, Ohio, United States. The locations of National Register properties and districts for which the latitude and longitude coordinates are included below, may be seen in a Google map.

There are 16 properties and districts listed on the National Register in the county, including 1 National Historic Landmark.

This National Park Service list is complete through NPS recent listings posted June 20, 2025.

== Current listings ==
	Name on the Register	Image	Date listed	Location	City or town	Description
1	Adams County Paleo-Indian District	Adams County Paleo-Indian District	October 17, 1974 (#74001389)	North of U.S. Route 52 near Sandy Springs; 38°36′48″N 83°17′39″W	Green Township	
2	Buckeye Station	Buckeye Station	May 1, 1974 (#74001388)	East of Manchester off U.S. Route 52; 38°42′22″N 83°32′31″W	Monroe Township	
3	Cockerill House	Cockerill House	November 21, 1978 (#78001998)	115 E. Main St. 38°47′41″N 83°32′42″W	West Union	
4	Dayton Power and Light Company Mound	Dayton Power and Light Company Mound	July 30, 1974 (#74001391)	On the grounds of the Dayton Power and Light's Killen Station plant, east of Wrightsville; 38°41′20″N 83°28′41″W	Monroe Township	
5	Harshaville Covered Bridge	Harshaville Covered Bridge	March 16, 1976 (#76001357)	Graces Run Rd. 38°54′28″N 83°32′37″W	Oliver Township	
6	Kirker Covered Bridge	Kirker Covered Bridge	October 29, 1975 (#75001309)	Southwest of West Union off State Route 136; 38°47′03″N 83°36′12″W	Liberty Township	
7	Gov. Thomas Kirker Homestead	Gov. Thomas Kirker Homestead	November 3, 1975 (#75001310)	Southwest of West Union off State Route 136; 38°46′28″N 83°35′57″W	Liberty Township	
8	Dr. A.C. Lewis House	Dr. A.C. Lewis House	October 31, 1980 (#80002931)	103 South St. 38°56′28″N 83°39′04″W	Winchester	
9	Serpent Mound	Serpent Mound	October 15, 1966 (#66000602)	5 mi (8.0 km) northwest of Locust Grove on State Route 73; 39°01′33″N 83°25′49″W	Bratton Township	
10	The Ridge	The Ridge	October 8, 1992 (#92001352)	503 E. 8th St. 38°41′37″N 83°36′16″W	Manchester	
11	Treber Inn	Treber Inn	May 17, 1976 (#76001358)	5 mi (8.0 km) northeast of West Union on State Route 41; 38°50′57″N 83°29′14″W	Tiffin Township	
12	Wamsley Village Site	Wamsley Village Site	July 30, 1974 (#74001390)	West of Stout, near the mouth of Brush Creek. On the grounds of the Dayton Power and Light's Killen Station plant 38°40′35″N 83°27′07″W	Monroe Township	
13	West Union Presbyterian Church	West Union Presbyterian Church	November 18, 1976 (#76001359)	108 S. 2nd St. 38°47′37″N 83°32′38″W	West Union	
14	Wickerham Inn	Wickerham Inn	May 7, 1979 (#79001778)	Northeast of Peebles on State Route 41; 38°58′13″N 83°23′39″W	Franklin Township	
15	John T. Wilson Homestead	John T. Wilson Homestead	April 11, 1977 (#77001039)	Northeast of Seaman on State Route 770; 38°57′48″N 83°31′57″W	Scott Township	
16	Tet Woods Building	Tet Woods Building	March 25, 1982 (#82003536)	307 Main St. 38°47′41″N 83°32′52″W	West Union	

== Former listing ==
	Name on the Register	Image	Date listed	Date removed	Location	City or town	Description
1	Sinton Homestead		June 10, 1975 (#14000763)	August 18, 1975	114 E. Main St.	West Union	Demolished on August 18, 1975.

== See also ==
- List of National Historic Landmarks in Ohio
- Listings in neighboring counties: Brown, Highland, Lewis (KY), Mason (KY), Pike, Scioto
- National Register of Historic Places listings in Ohio
