= Huntington Township, Ohio =

Huntington Township, Ohio, may refer to:

- Huntington Township, Brown County, Ohio
- Huntington Township, Gallia County, Ohio
- Huntington Township, Lorain County, Ohio
- Huntington Township, Ross County, Ohio
