= Sprigg Township, Adams County, Ohio =

Township in Ohio, US

- Township
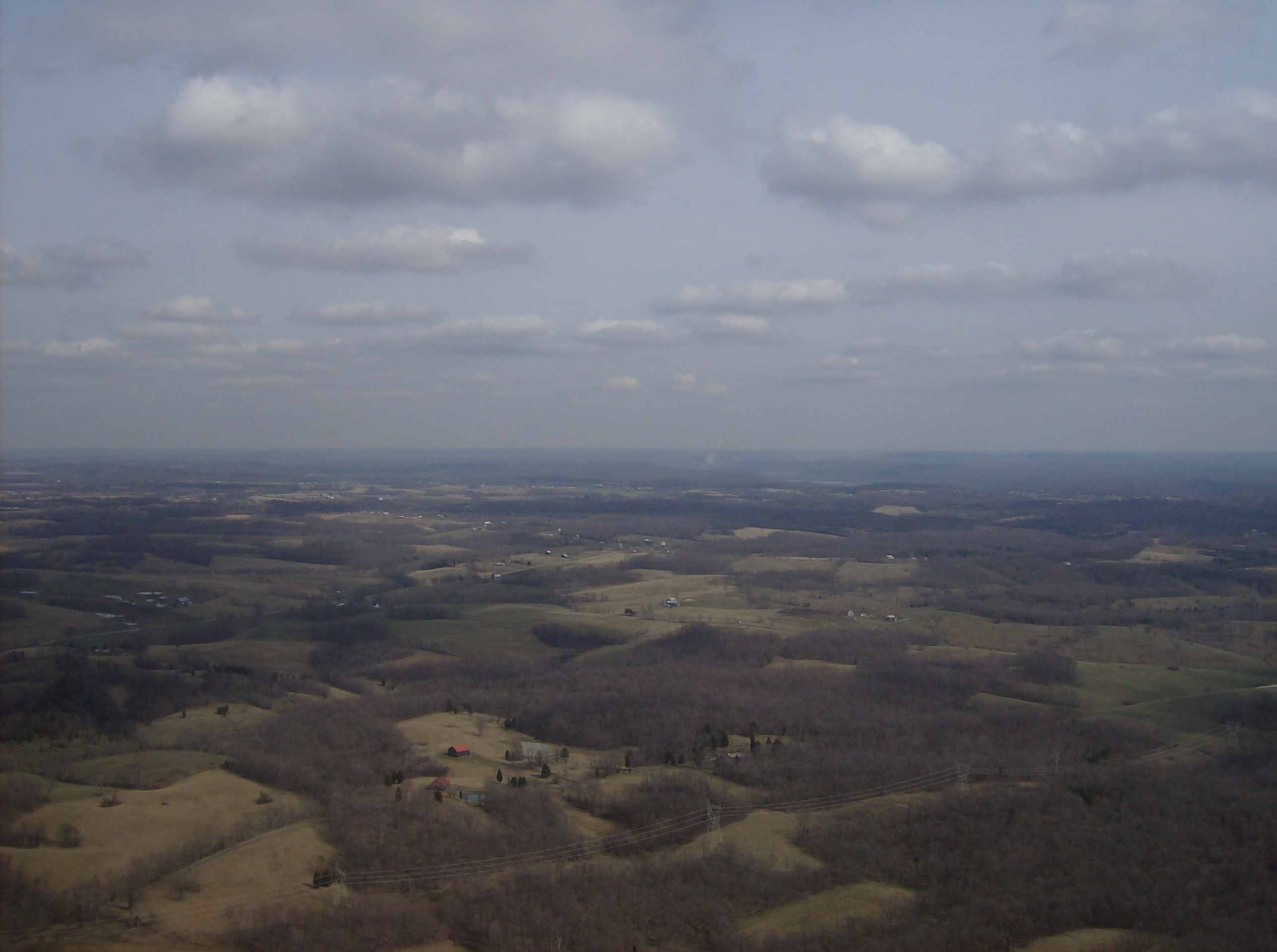
- Fields and woods on the hills of Sprigg Township

- Location in Adams County and the state of Ohio.
- Coordinates: 38°42′13″N 83°39′8″W
- Country: United States
- State: Ohio
- County: Adams

Area
  - Total: 44.5 sq mi (115.2 km^{2})
  - Land: 44.4 sq mi (114.9 km^{2})
  - Water: 0.12 sq mi (0.3 km^{2})
- Elevation: 902 ft (275 m)

Population (2020)
  - Total: 1,744
  - Density: 42/sq mi (16.3/km^{2})
- Time zone: UTC-5 (Eastern (EST))
  - Summer (DST): UTC-4 (EDT)
- FIPS code: 39-74069
- GNIS feature ID: 1085685

Sprigg Township is one of the fifteen townships of Adams County, Ohio, United States. The population was 1,744 at the 2020 census.

== Geography ==
Located in the southwestern corner of the county along the Ohio River, it borders the following townships:

- Liberty Township - north
- Monroe Township - northeast
- Manchester Township - east
- Huntington Township, Brown County - west

Kentucky lies across the Ohio River to the south: Lewis County to the southeast, and Mason County to the southwest.

A small corner of the village of Manchester is located in eastern Sprigg Township along the Ohio River, and the unincorporated community of Bentonville lies in the township's north.

== Name and history ==
Sprigg Township was organized in 1866. It is named for William Sprigg.

It is the only Sprigg Township statewide.

== Government ==
The township is governed by a three-member board of trustees, who are elected in November of odd-numbered years to a four-year term beginning on the following January 1. Two are elected in the year after the presidential election and one is elected in the year before it. There is also an elected township fiscal officer, who serves a four-year term beginning on April 1 of the year after the election, which is held in November of the year before the presidential election. Vacancies in the fiscal officership or on the board of trustees are filled by the remaining trustees.
