= Manchester Township, Ohio =

Manchester Township, Ohio may refer to:

- Manchester Township, Adams County, Ohio
- Manchester Township, Morgan County, Ohio
