= Tiffin Township, Ohio =

Tiffin Township, Ohio may refer to:

- Tiffin Township, Adams County, Ohio
- Tiffin Township, Defiance County, Ohio
