= Bentonville, Ohio =

- Unincorporated community and census-designated place
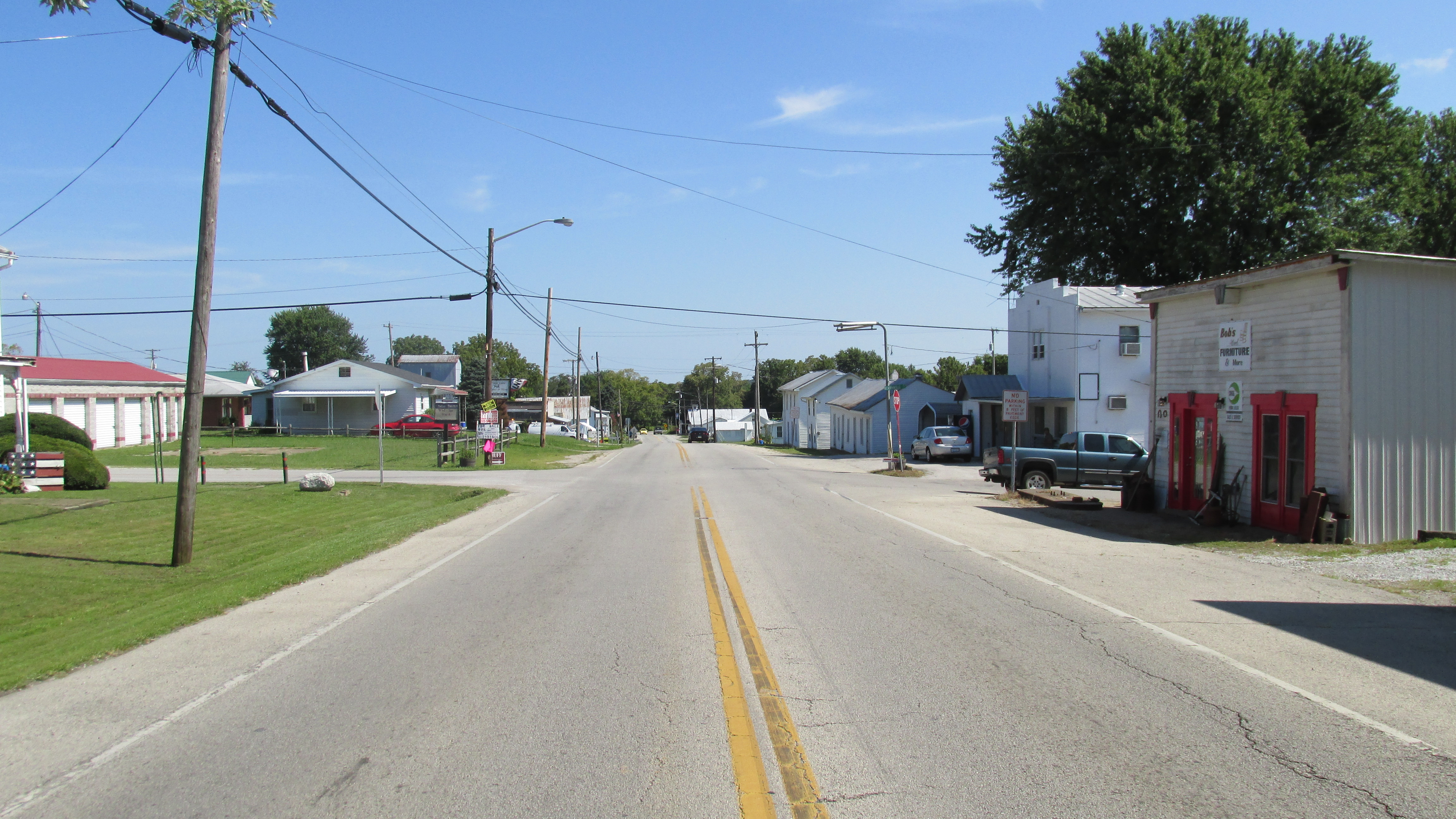
- Looking northeast on Ohio Highway 41/136 in Bentonville

- Location in Adams County and the state of Ohio
- Coordinates: 38°45′11″N 83°36′48″W
- Country: United States
- State: Ohio
- County: Adams
- Township: Sprigg
- Elevation: 906 ft (276 m)

Population (2020)
  - Total: 253
- Time zone: UTC-5 (Eastern (EST))
  - Summer (DST): UTC-4 (EDT)
- ZIP code: 45105
- Area codes: 937, 326
- GNIS feature ID: 2628863

Bentonville is a census-designated place in northern Sprigg Township, Adams County, Ohio, United States. The population was 253 at the 2020 census. It has a post office with the ZIP code 45105.

Bentonville is located on State Routes 41 and 136. They run concurrently through the community, splitting into separate routes at the south edge of Bentonville.

== History ==
Bentonville was laid out in 1839. It is named for Thomas Hart Benton, a senator from Missouri. A post office has been in operation at Bentonville since 1842.

Bentonville is the home of the Anti-Horse Thief Society monument. Horse theft is no longer a problem in Adams County. However, the Society continues to exist and hold meetings.

Verna Naylor, a former postmaster of Bentonville, was the oldest postmaster in the nation and the oldest employee of the U.S. Postal Service when she died on July 6, 2010, at the age of 94. She ran the one-person post office from her home for more than 40 years after she took over the position from her husband, the former postmaster.

== Gallery ==
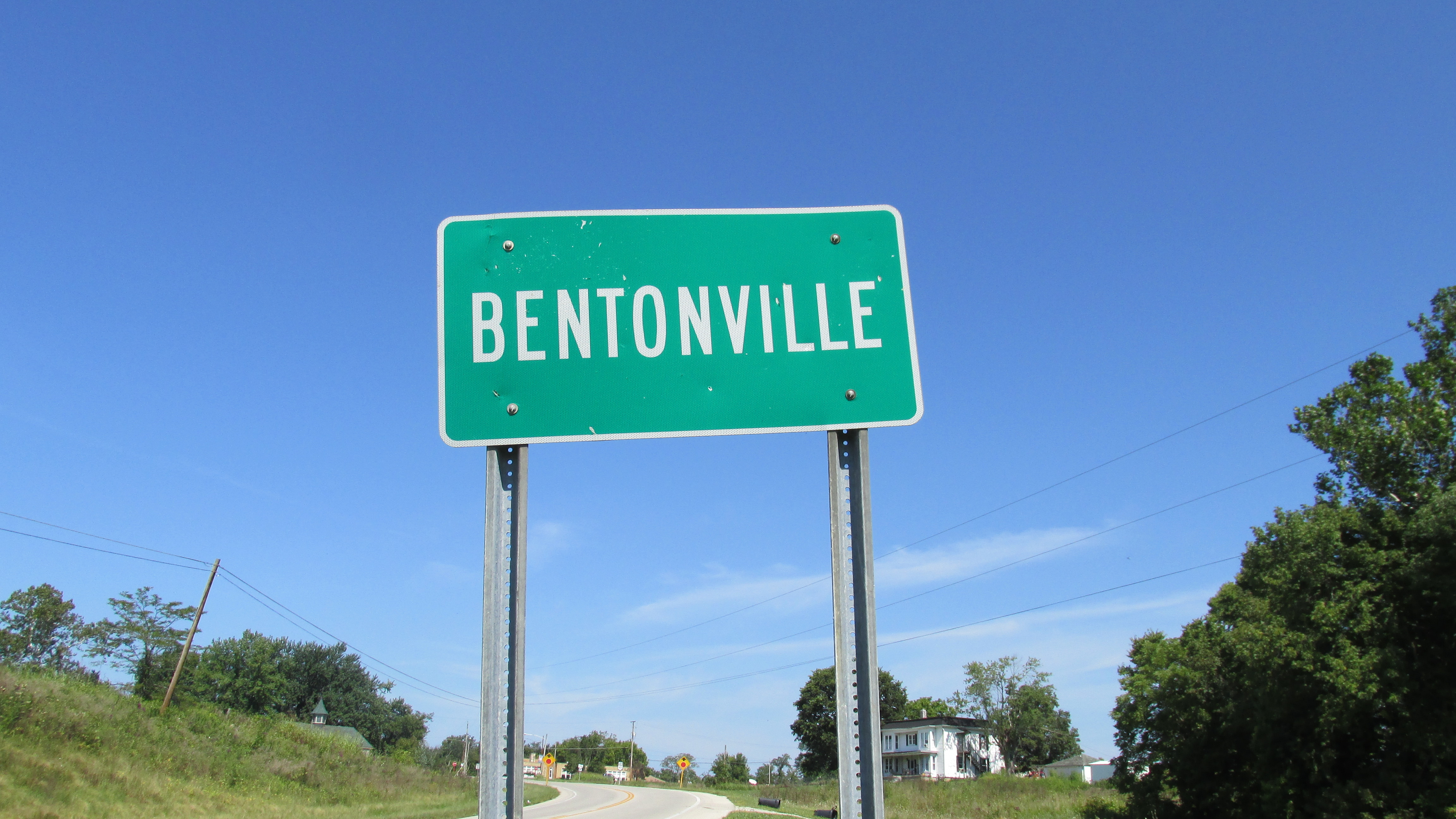
Bentonville community sign.

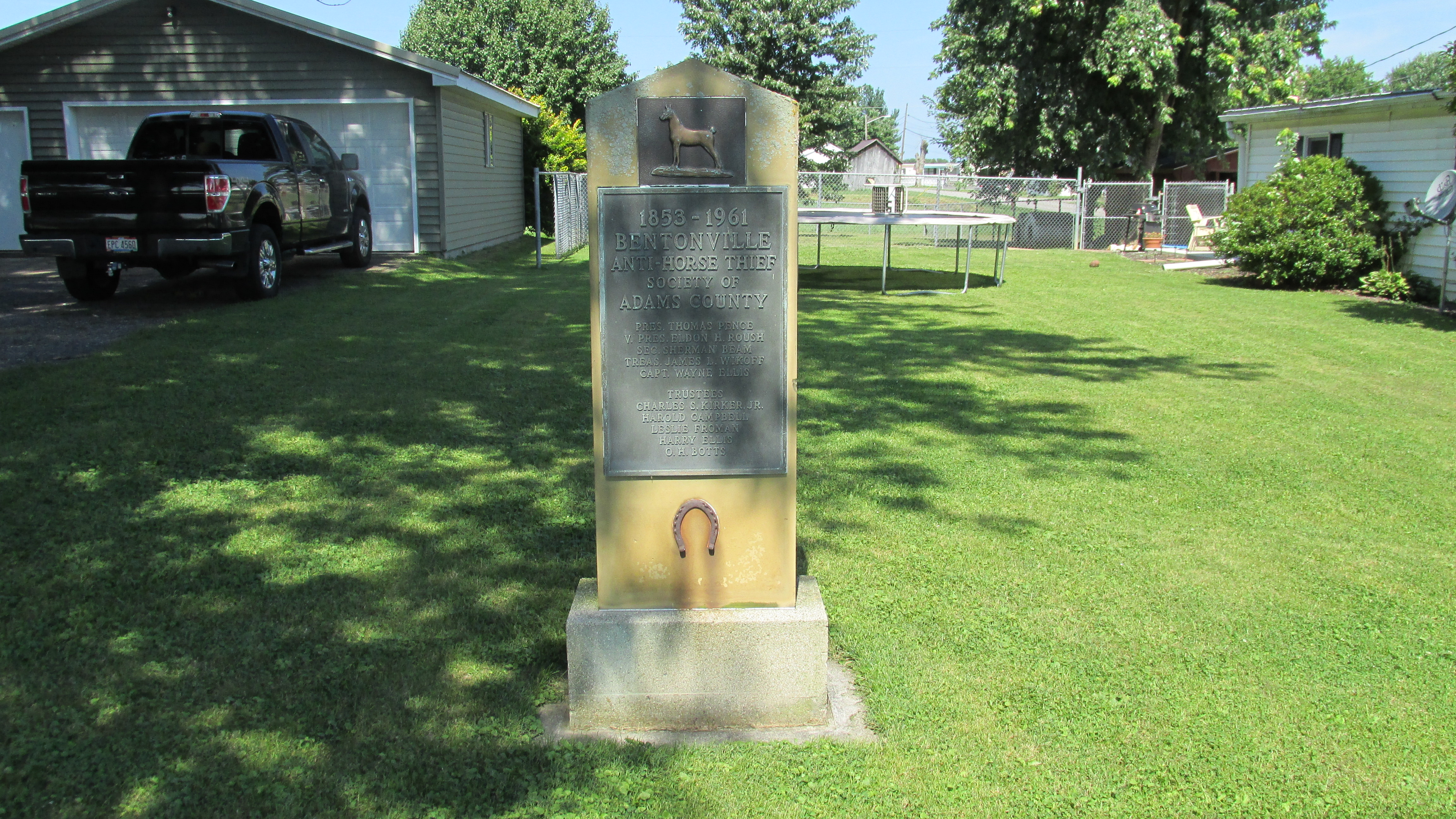
Bentonville Anti-Horse Thief monument.

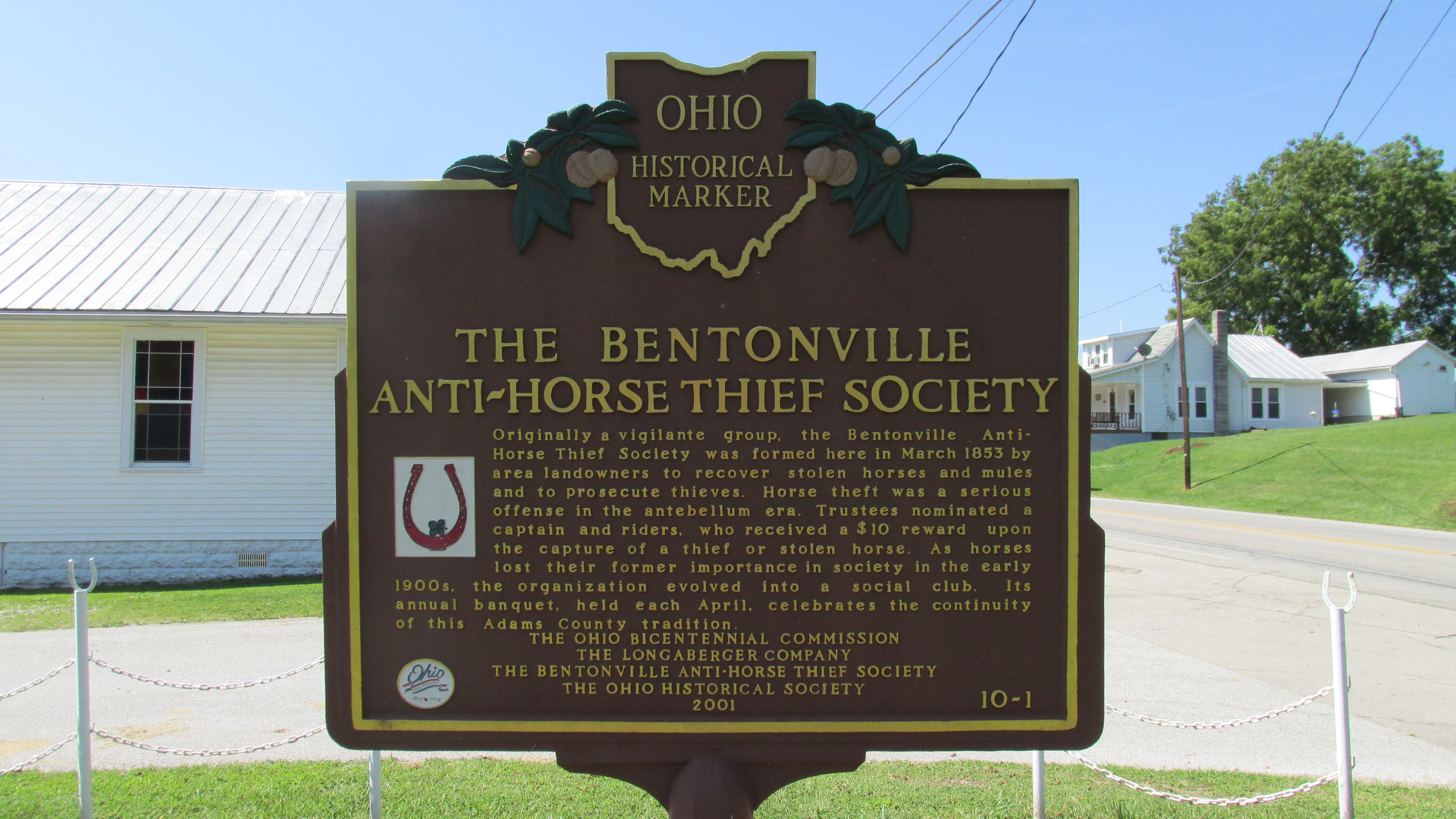
Bentonville Anti-Horse Thief Ohio Historical Marker.
