= Gov. Thomas Kirker Homestead =

- Kirker, Gov. Thomas, Homestead
- U.S. National Register of Historic Places
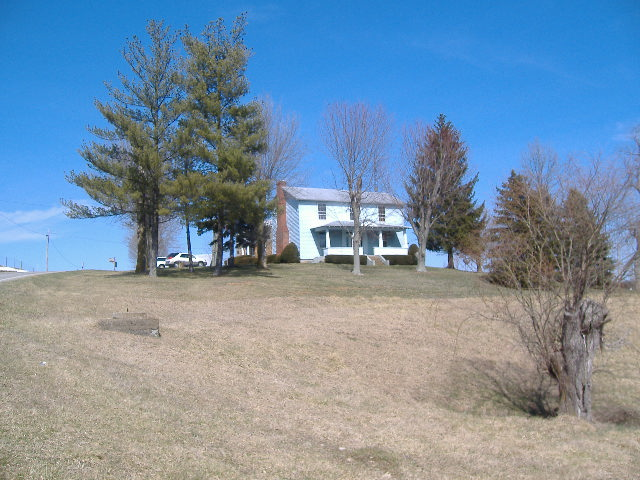

- Location within Ohio
- Nearest city: West Union, Ohio
- Coordinates: 38°46′28″N 83°35′57″W
- Area: 1.5 acres (0.61 ha)
- Built: 1805
- NRHP reference No.: 75001310
- Added to NRHP: November 3, 1975

The Gov. Thomas Kirker Homestead, in Liberty Township, Adams County, Ohio near West Union, Ohio, was built in 1805. It was listed on the National Register of Historic Places in 1975.

It is located southwest of West Union off State Route 136.

The original 1805-built portion of the house is a stone, three-bay by two-bay, one-and-a-half-story structure.

It was home of Thomas Kirker, an immigrant from Ireland who became Ohio's second governor during 1807–08.

The homestead was visited by Confederate soldiers raiding for horses, under John Hunt Morgan, but their quest was unsuccessful as the place had been warned of their approach.

== See also ==
- Kirker Covered Bridge, also NRHP-listed
