= Monroe Township, Adams County, Ohio =

Township in Ohio, US

- Township
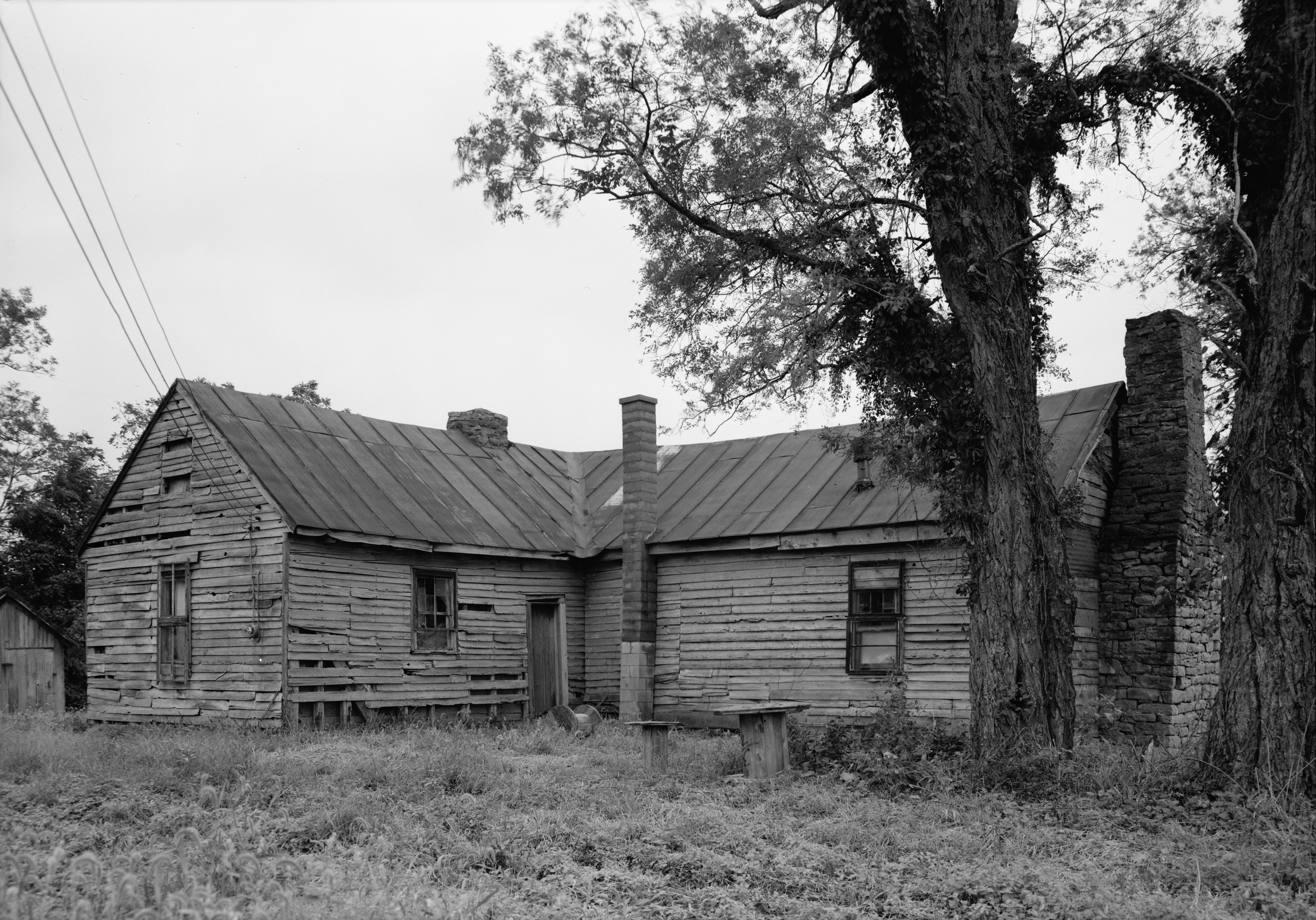
- 1797 home of Nathaniel Massie

- Location in Adams County and the state of Ohio.
- Coordinates: 38°43′46″N 83°29′42″W
- Country: United States
- State: Ohio
- County: Adams

Area
  - Total: 28.1 sq mi (72.7 km^{2})
  - Land: 27.2 sq mi (70.5 km^{2})
  - Water: 0.89 sq mi (2.3 km^{2})
- Elevation: 942 ft (287 m)

Population (2020)
  - Total: 624
  - Density: 25/sq mi (9.7/km^{2})
- Time zone: UTC-5 (Eastern (EST))
  - Summer (DST): UTC-4 (EDT)
- FIPS code: 39-51268
- GNIS feature ID: 1085682

Monroe Township is one of the fifteen townships of Adams County, Ohio, United States. The population was 624 at the 2020 census.

== Geography ==
Located in the southern part of the county along the Ohio River, it borders the following townships:

- Tiffin Township - north
- Brush Creek Township - northeast
- Green Township - east
- Manchester Township - southwest
- Sprigg Township - west
- Liberty Township - northwest

Lewis County, Kentucky lies across the Ohio River to the south.

No municipalities are located in Monroe Township.

== History ==
Monroe Township was organized in 1817. It is named for James Monroe.

It is one of twenty-two Monroe Townships statewide.

== Government ==
The township is governed by a three-member board of trustees, who are elected in November of odd-numbered years to a four-year term beginning on the following January 1. Two are elected in the year after the presidential election and one is elected in the year before it. There is also an elected township fiscal officer, who serves a four-year term beginning on April 1 of the year after the election, which is held in November of the year before the presidential election. Vacancies in the fiscal officership or on the board of trustees are filled by the remaining trustees.
