= Rome, Ohio =

Rome, Ohio Stout
- Village
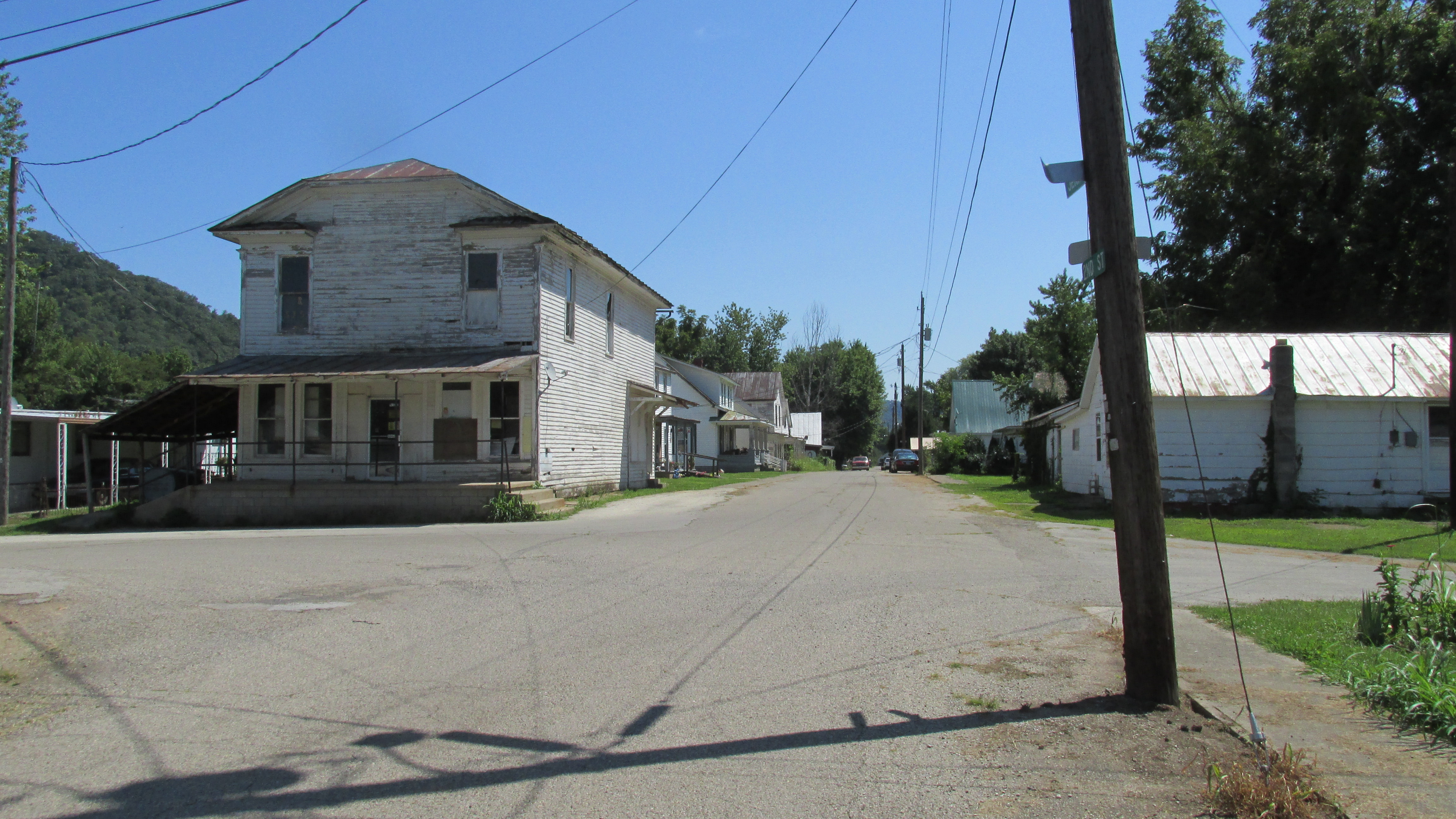
- Looking east at the intersection of Second and Main Streets

- Location in Adams County and the state of Ohio.
- Coordinates: 38°39′56″N 83°22′46″W
- Country: United States
- State: Ohio
- County: Adams
- Township: Green
- Founded: 1835

Government
  - Mayor: Melissa Jones

Area
  - Total: 0.25 sq mi (0.66 km^{2})
  - Land: 0.23 sq mi (0.60 km^{2})
  - Water: 0.023 sq mi (0.06 km^{2})
- Elevation: 502 ft (153 m)

Population (2020)
  - Total: 83
  - Density: 360.5/sq mi (139.19/km^{2})
- Time zone: UTC-5 (Eastern (EST))
  - Summer (DST): UTC-4 (EDT)
- ZIP code: 45684
- Area code: 937
- FIPS code: 39-68196
- GNIS feature ID: 2831322

Rome, also known as Stout, is a village in Green Township, Adams County, Ohio, United States, along the Ohio River. The population was 83 at the 2020 census. It is also the current residence of Melissa Jones who is the mayor.

== History ==
Rome was laid out in 1835 by William Stout. The village was named after Rome, Italy, according to local history. While the village is officially named Rome, it is often called "Stout"; even the community's post office is named "Stout," not "Rome." A post office called Stout has been in operation since 1893.

== Geography ==
According to the United States Census Bureau, the village has a total area of 0.26 square miles (0.67 km^{2}), of which 0.23 square miles (0.60 km^{2}) is land and 0.03 square miles (0.08 km^{2}) is water.

U.S. Route 52 passes to the north of Rome.

== Demographics ==
Historical population
| Census | Pop. | Note | %± |
|---|---|---|---|
| 1870 | 471 | | — |
| 1880 | 225 | | −52.2% |
| 1910 | 243 | | — |
| 1920 | 200 | | −17.7% |
| 1930 | 188 | | −6.0% |
| 1940 | 169 | | −10.1% |
| 1950 | 151 | | −10.7% |
| 1960 | 149 | | −1.3% |
| 1970 | 90 | | −39.6% |
| 1980 | 135 | | 50.0% |
| 1990 | 99 | | −26.7% |
| 2000 | 117 | | 18.2% |
| 2010 | 94 | | −19.7% |
| 2020 | 83 | | −11.7% |
U.S. Decennial Census

=== 2010 census ===
As of the census of 2010, there were 94 people, 45 households, and 26 families living in the village. The population density was 408.7 inhabitants per square mile (157.8/km^{2}). There were 64 housing units at an average density of 278.3 per square mile (107.5/km^{2}). The racial makeup of the village was 95.7% White, 2.1% Native American, and 2.1% from two or more races. Hispanic or Latino of any race were 1.1% of the population.

There were 45 households, of which 20.0% had children under the age of 18 living with them, 35.6% were married couples living together, 11.1% had a female householder with no husband present, 11.1% had a male householder with no wife present, and 42.2% were non-families. 37.8% of all households were made up of individuals, and 22.3% had someone living alone who was 65 years of age or older. The average household size was 2.09 and the average family size was 2.73.

The median age in the village was 49.3 years. 21.3% of residents were under the age of 18; 1.1% were between the ages of 18 and 24; 22.3% were from 25 to 44; 30.8% were from 45 to 64; and 24.5% were 65 years of age or older. The gender makeup of the village was 50.0% male and 50.0% female.

=== 2000 census ===
As of the census of 2000, there were 117 people, 46 households, and 31 families living in the village. The population density was 439.8 inhabitants per square mile (169.8/km^{2}). There were 58 housing units at an average density of 218.0 per square mile (84.2/km^{2}). The racial makeup of the village was 94.02% White, 4.27% Native American, and 1.71% from two or more races.

There were 46 households, out of which 43.5% had children under the age of 18 living with them, 43.5% were married couples living together, 15.2% had a female householder with no husband present, and 32.6% were non-families. 28.3% of all households were made up of individuals, and 15.2% had someone living alone who was 65 years of age or older. The average household size was 2.54 and the average family size was 3.06.

In the village, the population was spread out, with 29.9% under the age of 18, 7.7% from 18 to 24, 28.2% from 25 to 44, 22.2% from 45 to 64, and 12.0% who were 65 years of age or older. The median age was 33 years. For every 100 females, there were 82.8 males. For every 100 females age 18 and over, there were 86.4 males.

The median income for a household in the village was $31,136, and the median income for a family was $31,944. Males had a median income of $19,167 versus $30,500 for females. The per capita income for the village was $12,026. There were 28.9% of families and 24.4% of the population living below the poverty line, including 30.3% of under eighteens and none of those over 64.

== Government ==
In 2016, the Ohio Auditor of State deemed Rome to be "unauditable" due to recordkeeping issues and a lack of elected village leadership. A 2021 analysis of the village by the Auditor of State determined that there had been no elected officials since 1995, and that the village had not approved a tax budget since at least 2016; these criteria, in addition to considering the village's small size, led the Auditor to request that the Ohio Attorney General begin legal action to dissolve the village.

== See also ==
- List of cities and towns along the Ohio River
