= Meigs Township, Adams County, Ohio =

Township in Ohio, US

- Township
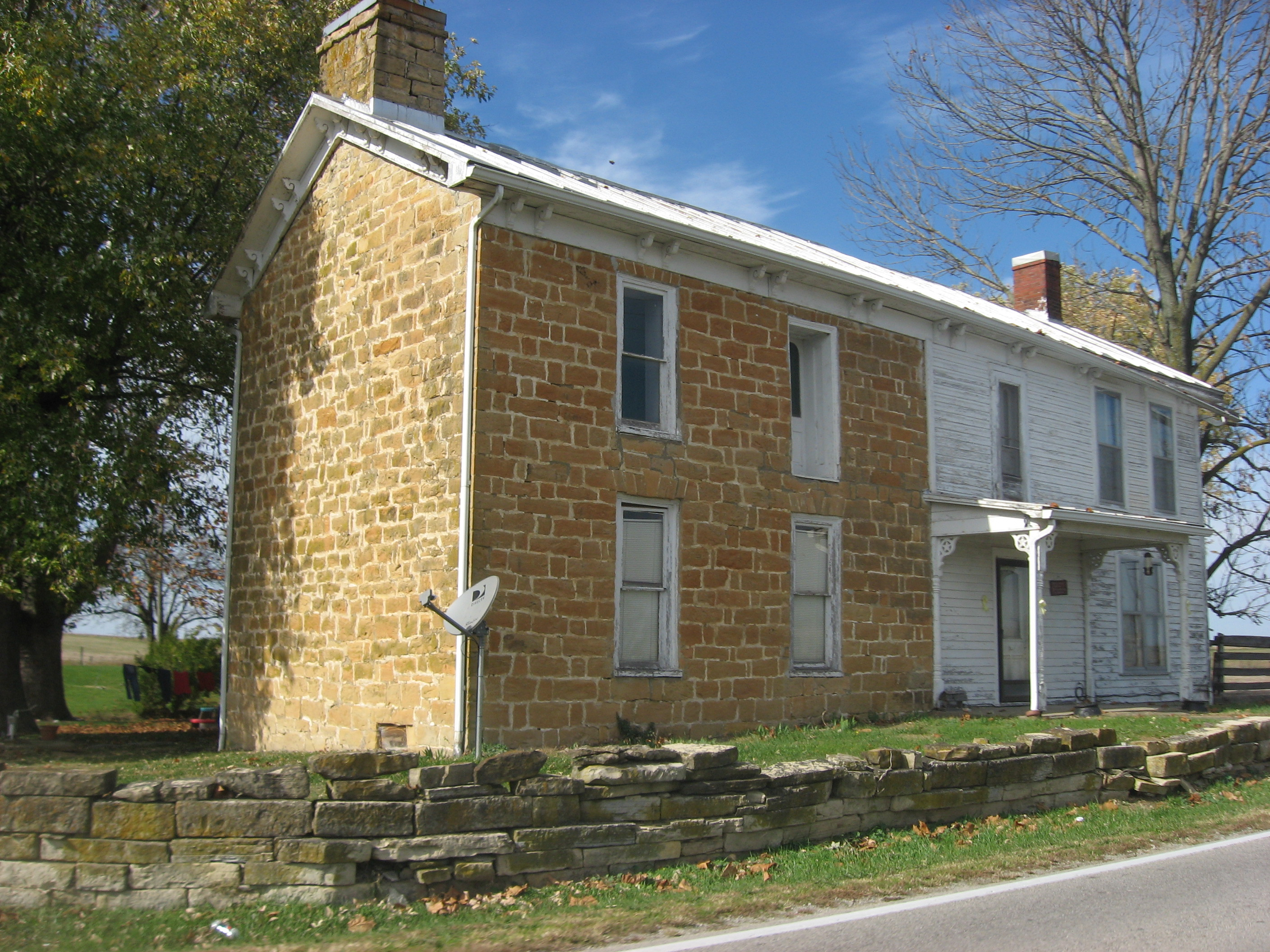
- A farmhouse north of Peebles

- Location in Adams County and the state of Ohio.
- Coordinates: 38°55′13″N 83°23′12″W
- Country: United States
- State: Ohio
- County: Adams

Area
  - Total: 63.1 sq mi (163.4 km^{2})
  - Land: 62.6 sq mi (162.1 km^{2})
  - Water: 0.46 sq mi (1.2 km^{2})
- Elevation: 846 ft (258 m)

Population (2020)
  - Total: 3,761
  - Density: 62/sq mi (24.1/km^{2})
- Time zone: UTC-5 (Eastern (EST))
  - Summer (DST): UTC-4 (EDT)
- FIPS code: 39-48888
- GNIS feature ID: 1085681

Meigs Township is one of the fifteen townships of Adams County, Ohio, United States. The population was 3,761 at the 2020 census.

== Geography ==
Located in the eastern part of the county, it borders the following townships:

- Bratton Township - north, west of Franklin Township
- Franklin Township - north, east of Bratton Township
- Rarden Township, Scioto County - northeast
- Brush Creek Township, Scioto County - southeast
- Jefferson Township - south, east of Brush Creek Township
- Brush Creek Township - south, west of Jefferson Township
- Tiffin Township - southwest
- Oliver Township - west
- Scott Township - northwest

The village of Peebles is located in northern Meigs Township.

== History ==
Meigs Township was organized in 1806. It is named for Return J. Meigs, Jr.

Statewide, the only other Meigs Township is located in Muskingum County.

== Government ==
The township is governed by a three-member board of trustees, who are elected in November of odd-numbered years to a four-year term beginning on the following January 1.

Two are elected in the year after the presidential election and one is elected in the year before it. There is also an elected township fiscal officer, who serves a four-year term beginning on April 1 of the year after the election, which is held in November of the year before the presidential election. Vacancies in the fiscal officership or on the board of trustees are filled by the remaining trustees.
