= Wayne Township, Adams County, Ohio =

Township in Ohio, US

- Township
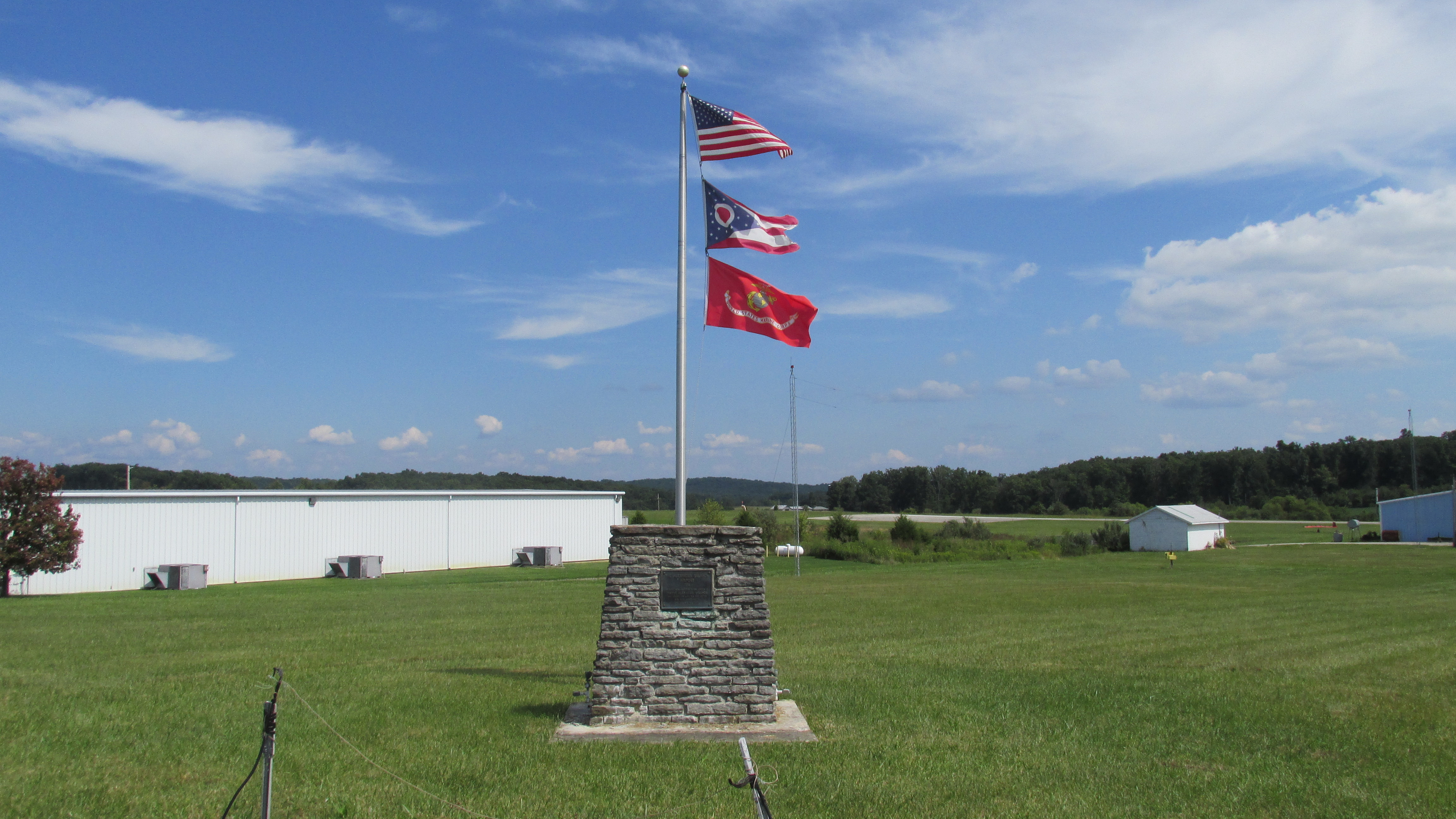
- Alexander Salamon Airport

- Location in Adams County and the state of Ohio.
- Coordinates: 38°53′27″N 83°36′1″W
- Country: United States
- State: Ohio
- County: Adams

Area
  - Total: 28.1 sq mi (72.7 km^{2})
  - Land: 28.1 sq mi (72.7 km^{2})
  - Water: 0 sq mi (0.0 km^{2})
- Elevation: 935 ft (285 m)

Population (2020)
  - Total: 1,363
  - Density: 46/sq mi (17.9/km^{2})
- Time zone: UTC-5 (Eastern (EST))
  - Summer (DST): UTC-4 (EDT)
- FIPS code: 39-82012
- GNIS feature ID: 1085687

Wayne Township is one of the fifteen townships of Adams County, Ohio, United States. The population was 1,363 at the 2020 census.

== Geography ==
Located in the western part of the county, it borders the following townships:

- Winchester Township - north
- Scott Township - northeast
- Oliver Township - east
- Tiffin Township - southeast
- Liberty Township - south
- Byrd Township, Brown County - southwest
- Jackson Township, Brown County - west

Two incorporated villages are located in Wayne Township: Cherry Fork in the center, and part of Seaman in the far north.

== Name and history ==
Wayne Township was formed in 1806. It is named for Anthony Wayne.

It is one of twenty Wayne Townships statewide.

== Government ==
The township is governed by a three-member board of trustees, who are elected in November of odd-numbered years to a four-year term beginning on the following January 1. Two are elected in the year after the presidential election and one is elected in the year before it. There is also an elected township fiscal officer, who serves a four-year term beginning on April 1 of the year after the election, which is held in November of the year before the presidential election. Vacancies in the fiscal officership or on the board of trustees are filled by the remaining trustees.
