= Green Township, Adams County, Ohio =

Township in Ohio, US

- Township
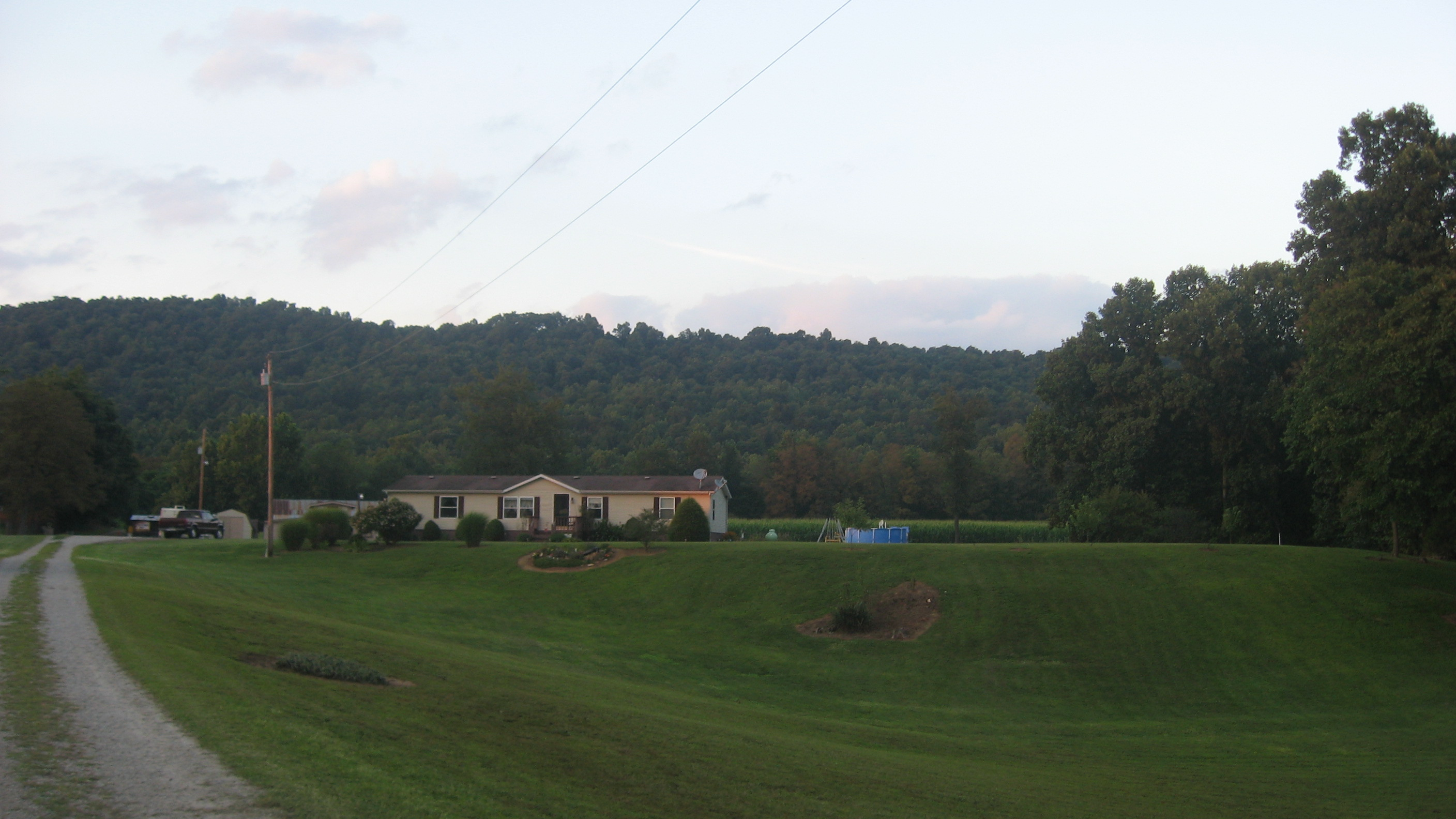
- Countryside near Sandy Springs

- Location in Adams County and the state of Ohio.
- Coordinates: 38°39′28″N 83°21′35″W
- Country: United States
- State: Ohio
- County: Adams

Area
  - Total: 55.5 sq mi (143.8 km^{2})
  - Land: 55.0 sq mi (142.5 km^{2})
  - Water: 0.54 sq mi (1.4 km^{2})
- Elevation: 791 ft (241 m)

Population (2020)
  - Total: 552
  - Density: 12/sq mi (4.6/km^{2})
- Time zone: UTC-5 (Eastern (EST))
  - Summer (DST): UTC-4 (EDT)
- FIPS code: 39-31668
- GNIS feature ID: 1085677

Green Township is one of the fifteen townships of Adams County, Ohio, United States. The population was 552 at the 2020 census.

== Geography ==
Located in the southeastern corner of the county along the Ohio River, it borders the following townships:

- Brush Creek Township - north
- Jefferson Township - northeast
- Nile Township, Scioto County - east
- Monroe Township - west

Lewis County, Kentucky lies across the Ohio River to the southwest.

It is the most southerly township in Adams County.

The village of Rome is located in central Green Township along the Ohio River.

== Name and history ==
Green Township is named for General Nathanael Greene. It is one of sixteen Green Townships statewide.

== Government ==
The township is governed by a three-member board of trustees, who are elected in November of odd-numbered years to a four-year term beginning on the following January 1. Two are elected in the year after the presidential election and one is elected in the year before it. There is also an elected township fiscal officer, who serves a four-year term beginning on April 1 of the year after the election, which is held in November of the year before the presidential election. Vacancies in the fiscal officership or on the board of trustees are filled by the remaining trustees.
