= Manchester Township, Adams County, Ohio =

Township in Ohio, US

- Township
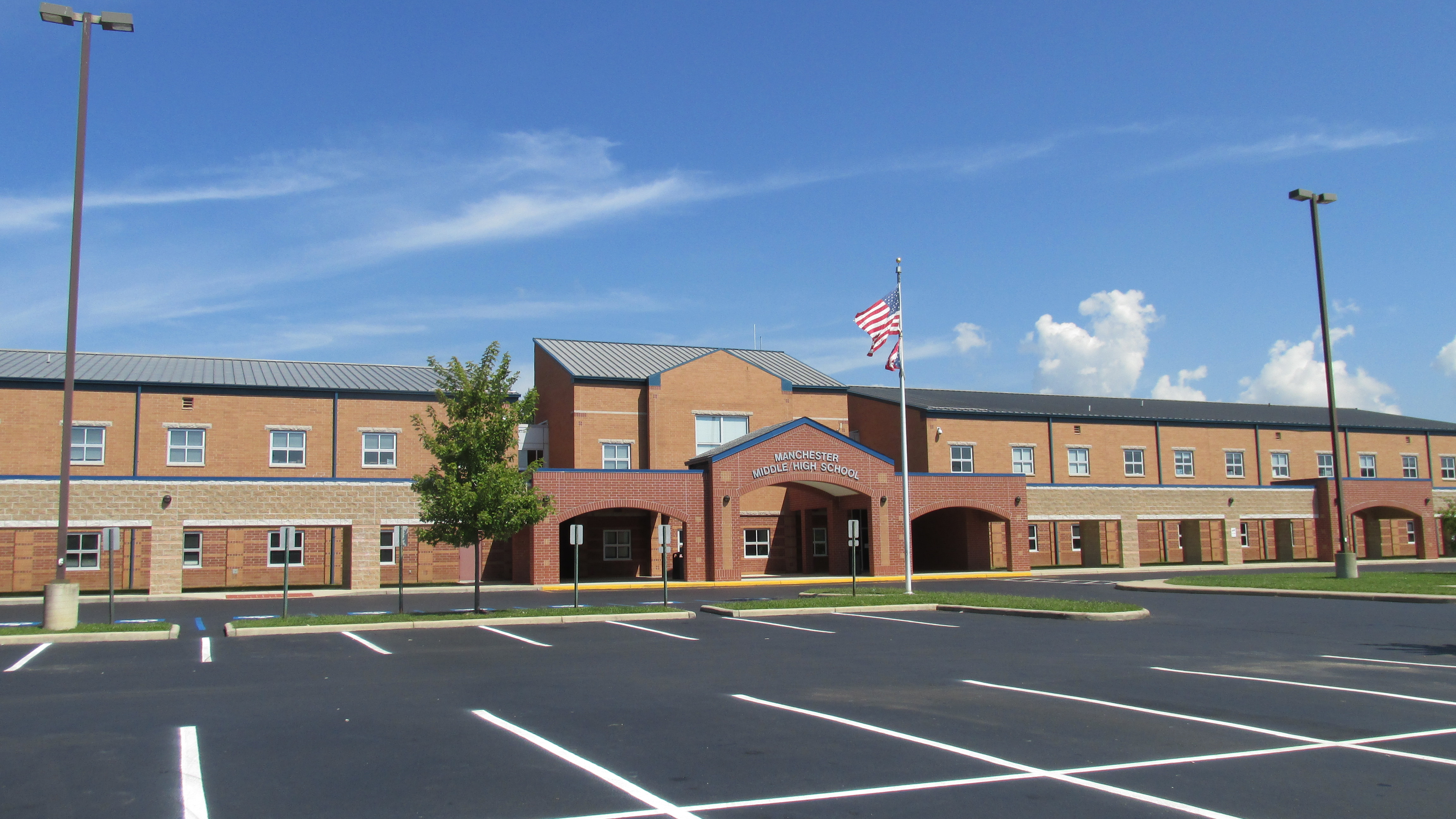
- Manchester High School

- Location in Adams County and the state of Ohio.
- Coordinates: 38°41′23″N 83°36′30″W
- Country: United States
- State: Ohio
- County: Adams

Area
  - Total: 2.4 sq mi (6.3 km^{2})
  - Land: 2.4 sq mi (6.2 km^{2})
  - Water: 0.039 sq mi (0.1 km^{2})
- Elevation: 548 ft (167 m)

Population (2020)
  - Total: 1,882
  - Density: 850/sq mi (330/km^{2})
- Time zone: UTC-5 (Eastern (EST))
  - Summer (DST): UTC-4 (EDT)
- ZIP code: 45144
- Area codes: 937, 326
- FIPS code: 39-47026
- GNIS feature ID: 1085680

Manchester Township is one of the fifteen townships of Adams County, Ohio, United States. The population was 1,882 at the 2020 census.

== Geography ==
Located in the southwestern part of the county along the Ohio River, it borders the following townships:

- Monroe Township - east
- Sprigg Township - west

Lewis County, Kentucky lies across the Ohio River to the south.

Most of the village of Manchester is located in southern Manchester Township along the Ohio River.

== Name and history ==
Statewide, the only other Manchester Township is located in Morgan County.

== Government ==
The township is governed by a three-member board of trustees, who are elected in November of odd-numbered years to a four-year term beginning on the following January 1. Two are elected in the year after the presidential election and one is elected in the year before it. There is also an elected township fiscal officer, who serves a four-year term beginning on April 1 of the year after the election, which is held in November of the year before the presidential election. Vacancies in the fiscal officership or on the board of trustees are filled by the remaining trustees.
