= Buckeye Station =

- U.S. National Register of Historic Places
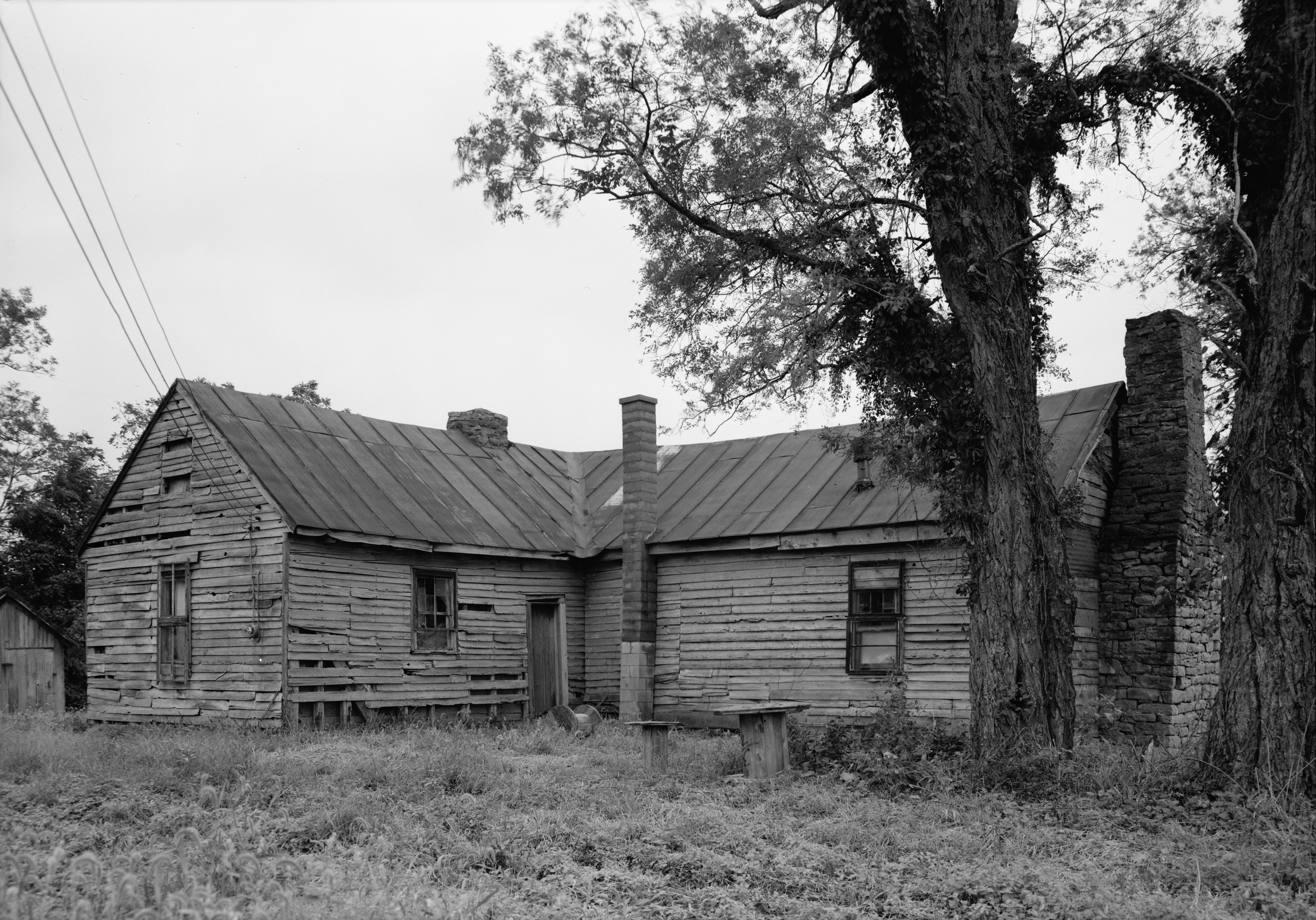
- Buckeye Station in 1971

- Location within Ohio Location within the United States
- Nearest city: Manchester, Ohio
- Coordinates: 38°42′22″N 83°32′31″W
- Area: less than one acre
- Built: 1797
- NRHP reference No.: 74001388
- Added to NRHP: May 1, 1974

Buckeye Station was built in 1797 by General Nathaniel Massie, a surveyor and early Ohio settler, who lived there for a brief time. It is located just east of Manchester, Ohio, in the uplands overlooking the Ohio River. Massie founded several towns in Ohio, including nearby Manchester, Ohio as well as the state's first capital Chillicothe. Massie leased the property to John Moore for a time, and then sold it to his brother-in-law Charles Willing Byrd.

The original house on the property was a c. 1791 log cabin called Buckeye Station because it was constructed of buckeye timber. It was built near Massie Station, a stockaded village established by Massie that later became Manchester. The log cabin was replaced by the current one-and-half story L-shaped house in 1797.

Today Buckeye Station is a crumbling ruin. It stands in the shadow of a cell phone tower, in a patch of woods, near a large agricultural field. A historical marker is located to the south on highway 52.
