= Huntington Township, Brown County, Ohio =

Township in Ohio, US

- Township
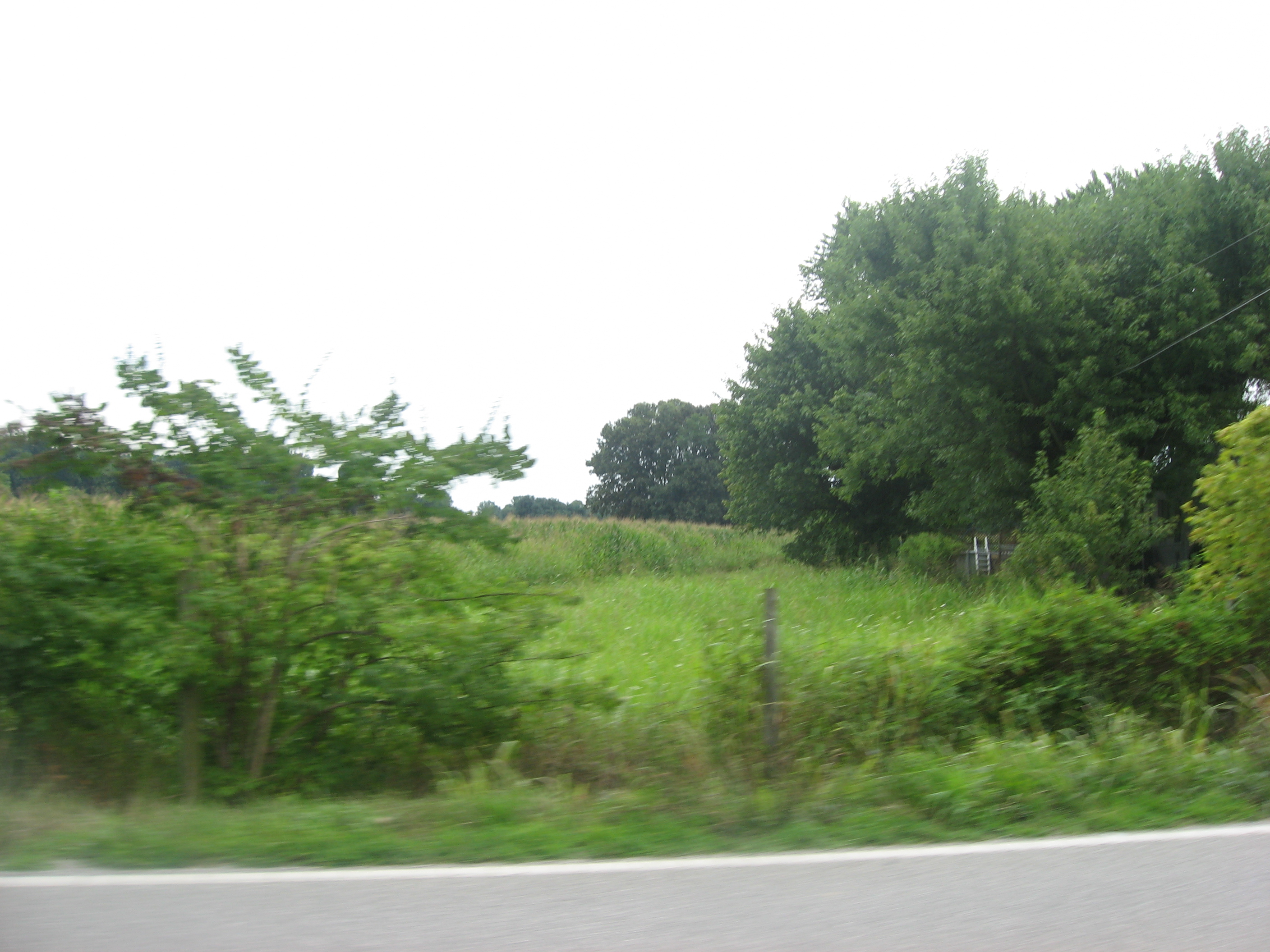
- Fields north of Aberdeen

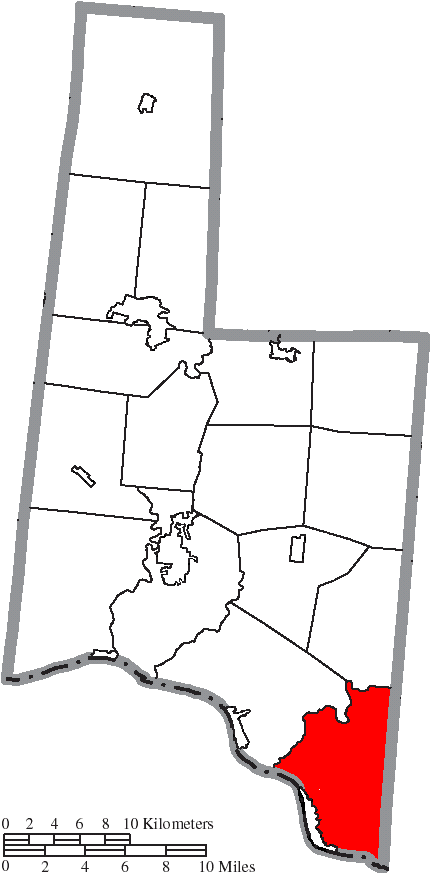
- Location of Huntington Township in Brown County
- Coordinates: 38°41′21″N 83°45′30″W
- Country: United States
- State: Ohio
- County: Brown

Area
  - Total: 34.2 sq mi (88.6 km^{2})
  - Land: 33.6 sq mi (87.0 km^{2})
  - Water: 0.62 sq mi (1.6 km^{2})
- Elevation: 781 ft (238 m)

Population (2020)
  - Total: 2,478
  - Density: 73.8/sq mi (28.5/km^{2})
- Time zone: UTC-5 (Eastern (EST))
  - Summer (DST): UTC-4 (EDT)
- FIPS code: 39-36834
- GNIS feature ID: 1085797

Huntington Township is one of the sixteen townships of Brown County, Ohio, United States. The 2020 census found 2,478 people in the township.

== Geography ==
Located in the southeastern corner of the county along the Ohio River, it borders the following townships:

- Byrd Township - north
- Liberty Township, Adams County - northeast
- Sprigg Township, Adams County - east
- Union Township - northwest
- Mason County, Kentucky lies across the Ohio River to the southwest.

It is the most southerly township in Brown County.

The village of Aberdeen is located in southwestern Huntington Township, along the Ohio River.

== Name and history ==
Huntington Township is named for Samuel Huntington, signer of the Declaration of Independence.

Statewide, other Huntington Townships are located in Gallia, Lorain, and Ross counties.

== Government ==
The township is governed by a three-member board of trustees, who are elected in November of odd-numbered years to a four-year term beginning on the following January 1. Two are elected in the year after the presidential election and one is elected in the year before it. There is also an elected township fiscal officer, who serves a four-year term beginning on April 1 of the year after the election, which is held in November of the year before the presidential election. Vacancies in the fiscal officership or on the board of trustees are filled by the remaining trustees.
