= Oliver Township, Adams County, Ohio =

Township in Ohio, US

- Township
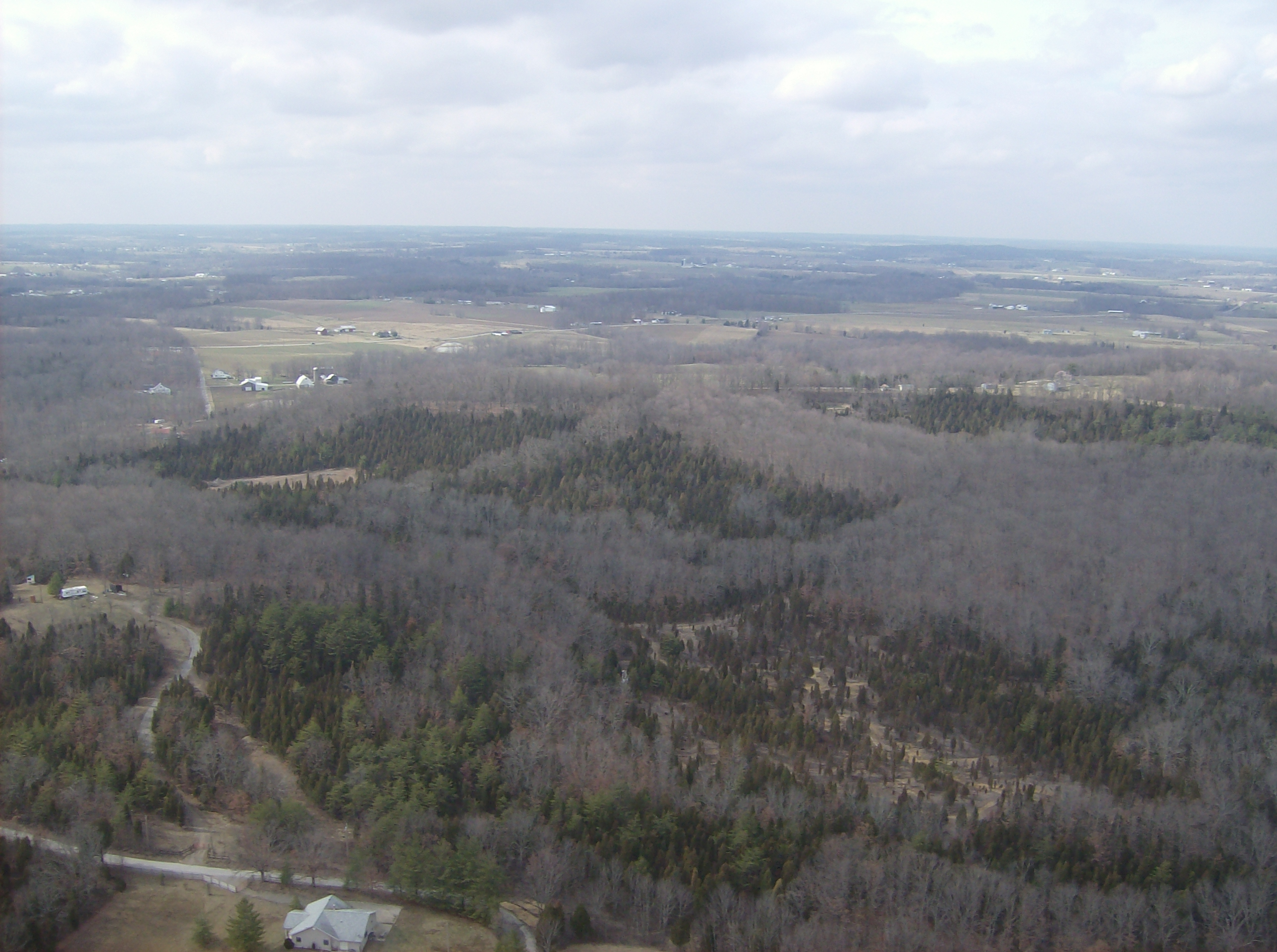
- Much of Oliver Township is forested.

- Location in Adams County and the state of Ohio.
- Coordinates: 38°54′0″N 83°30′12″W
- Country: United States
- State: Ohio
- County: Adams

Area
  - Total: 29.0 sq mi (75.1 km^{2})
  - Land: 29.0 sq mi (75.0 km^{2})
  - Water: 0.039 sq mi (0.1 km^{2})
- Elevation: 928 ft (283 m)

Population (2020)
  - Total: 1,352
  - Density: 46/sq mi (17.6/km^{2})
- Time zone: UTC-5 (Eastern (EST))
  - Summer (DST): UTC-4 (EDT)
- FIPS code: 39-58366
- GNIS feature ID: 1085683

Oliver Township is one of the fifteen townships of Adams County, Ohio, United States. As population was 1,352 at the 2020 census.

== Geography ==
Located in the central part of the county, it borders the following townships:

- Scott Township - north
- Meigs Township - east
- Tiffin Township - south
- Wayne Township - west

No municipalities are located in Oliver Township.

== Name and history ==
Oliver Township was organized in 1853. It was named for John Oliver, a county commissioner.

It is the only Oliver Township statewide.

== Government ==
The township is governed by a three-member board of trustees, who are elected in November of odd-numbered years to a four-year term beginning on the following January 1. Two are elected in the year after the presidential election and one is elected in the year before it. There is also an elected township fiscal officer, who serves a four-year term beginning on April 1 of the year after the election, which is held in November of the year before the presidential election. Vacancies in the fiscal officership or on the board of trustees are filled by the remaining trustees.
