= Scott Township, Adams County, Ohio =

Township in Ohio, US

- Township
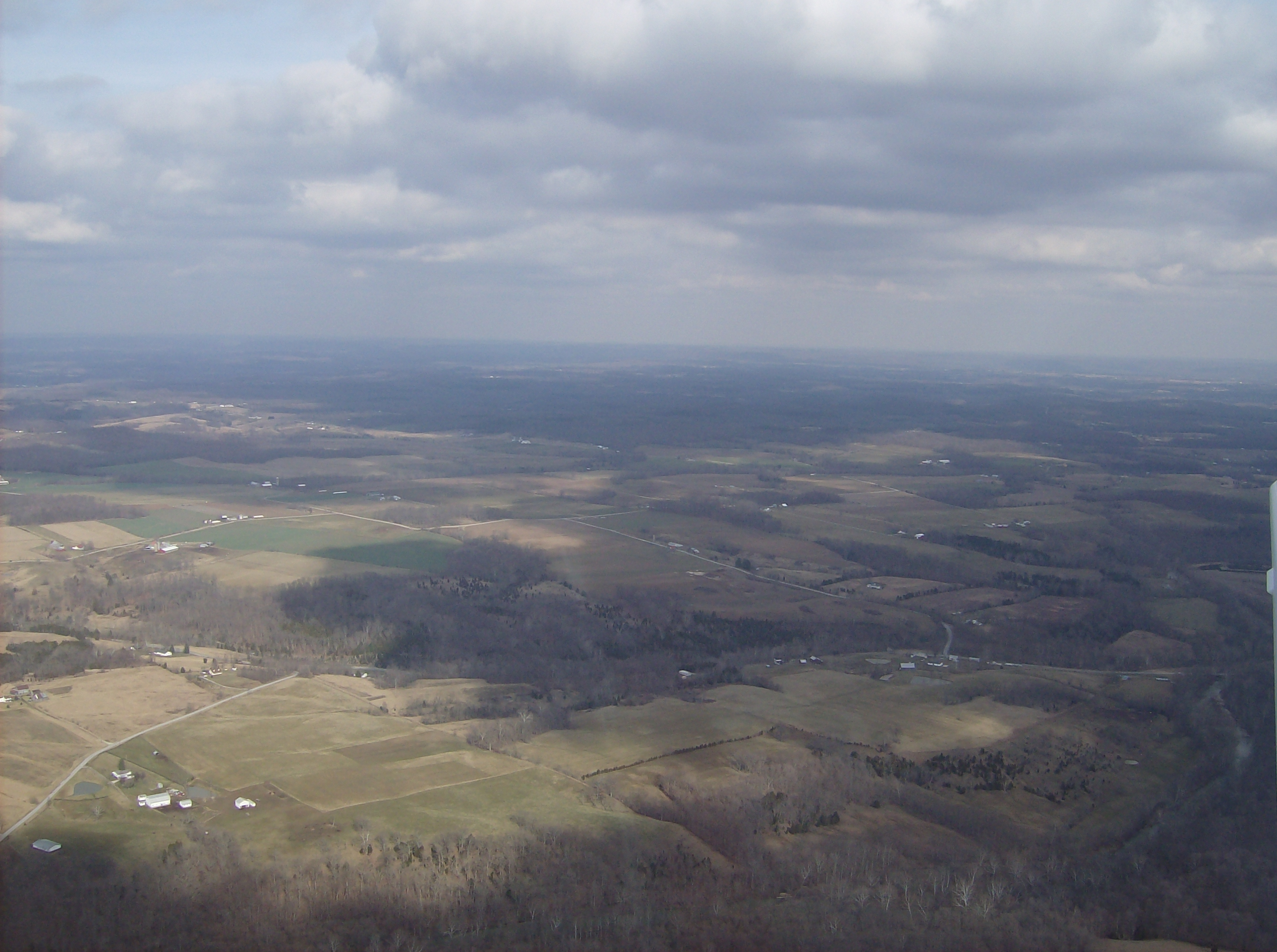
- Countryside in western Scott Township

- Location in Adams County and the state of Ohio.
- Coordinates: 38°58′4″N 83°33′31″W
- Country: United States
- State: Ohio
- County: Adams
- Organized: December 2, 1818

Area
  - Total: 37.5 sq mi (97.0 km^{2})
  - Land: 37.5 sq mi (97.0 km^{2})
  - Water: 0 sq mi (0.0 km^{2})
- Elevation: 692 ft (211 m)

Population (2020)
  - Total: 2,262
  - Density: 58/sq mi (22.5/km^{2})
- Time zone: UTC-5 (Eastern (EST))
  - Summer (DST): UTC-4 (EDT)
- FIPS code: 39-71052
- GNIS feature ID: 1085684

Scott Township is one of the fifteen townships of Adams County, Ohio, United States. The population was 2,262 at the 2020 census.

== Geography ==
Located in the northern part of the county, it borders the following townships:

- Jackson Township, Highland County - north
- Bratton Township - northeast
- Meigs Township - east
- Oliver Township - southeast
- Wayne Township - southwest
- Winchester Township - west
- Concord Township, Highland County - northwest

Most of the village of Seaman is located in southwestern Scott Township.

== Name and history ==
Statewide, other Scott Townships are located in Brown, Marion, and Sandusky counties.

Scott Township was either named for Edwin Scott, an early settler, or for Thomas Scott, a judge of the Ohio Supreme Court.

The township was organized on December 2, 1818.

== Government ==
The township is governed by a three-member board of trustees, who are elected in November of odd-numbered years to a four-year term beginning on the following January 1. Two are elected in the year after the presidential election and one is elected in the year before it. There is also an elected township fiscal officer, who serves a four-year term beginning on April 1 of the year after the election, which is held in November of the year before the presidential election. Vacancies in the fiscal officership or on the board of trustees are filled by the remaining trustees.
