= Kirker Covered Bridge =

- U.S. National Register of Historic Places
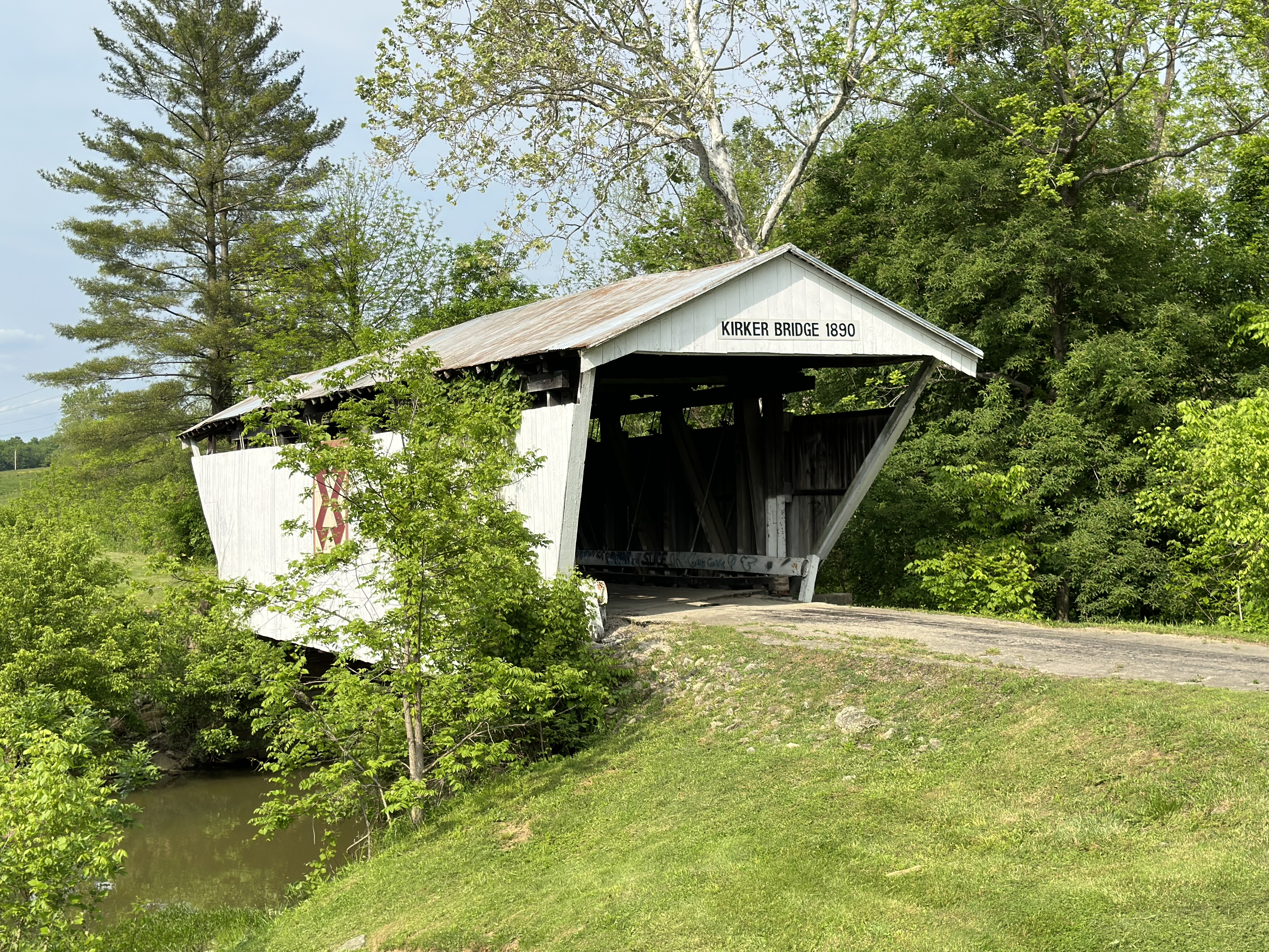
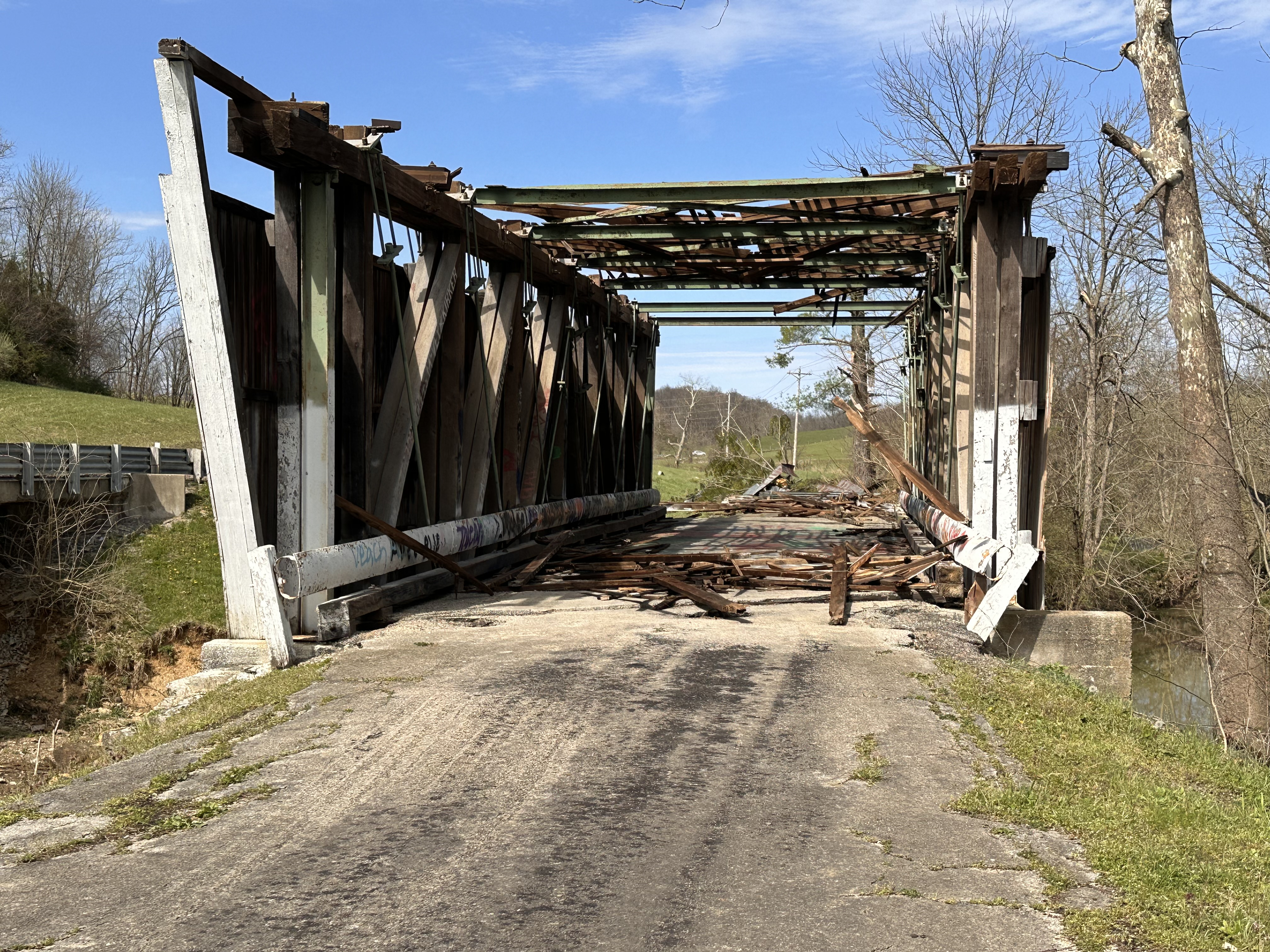
- Kirker Covered Bridge in 2023 Kirker Covered Bridge after tornado damage

- Location within Ohio
- Nearest city: West Union, Ohio
- Coordinates: 38°47′03″N 83°36′12″W
- Area: less than one acre
- Built: c.1865-70
- Architectural style: Kingpost truss bridge
- NRHP reference No.: 75001309
- Added to NRHP: October 29, 1975

The Kirker Covered Bridge, near West Union, Ohio, was built in the late 1860s. It was listed on the National Register of Historic Places in 1975.

It was a kingpost truss bridge.

It was located southwest of West Union off State Route 136. It was named for the Ohio governor during 1807–08, Thomas Kirker, who had immigrated from Ireland in 1779 and was the first permanent settler in the area, in 1794.

The bridge was closed to vehicular traffic.

The bridge was heavily damaged by a tornado on April 2, 2024.

== See also ==
- Governor Thomas Kirker Homestead, also NRHP-listed
