= Tiffin Township, Adams County, Ohio =

Township in Ohio, US

- Township
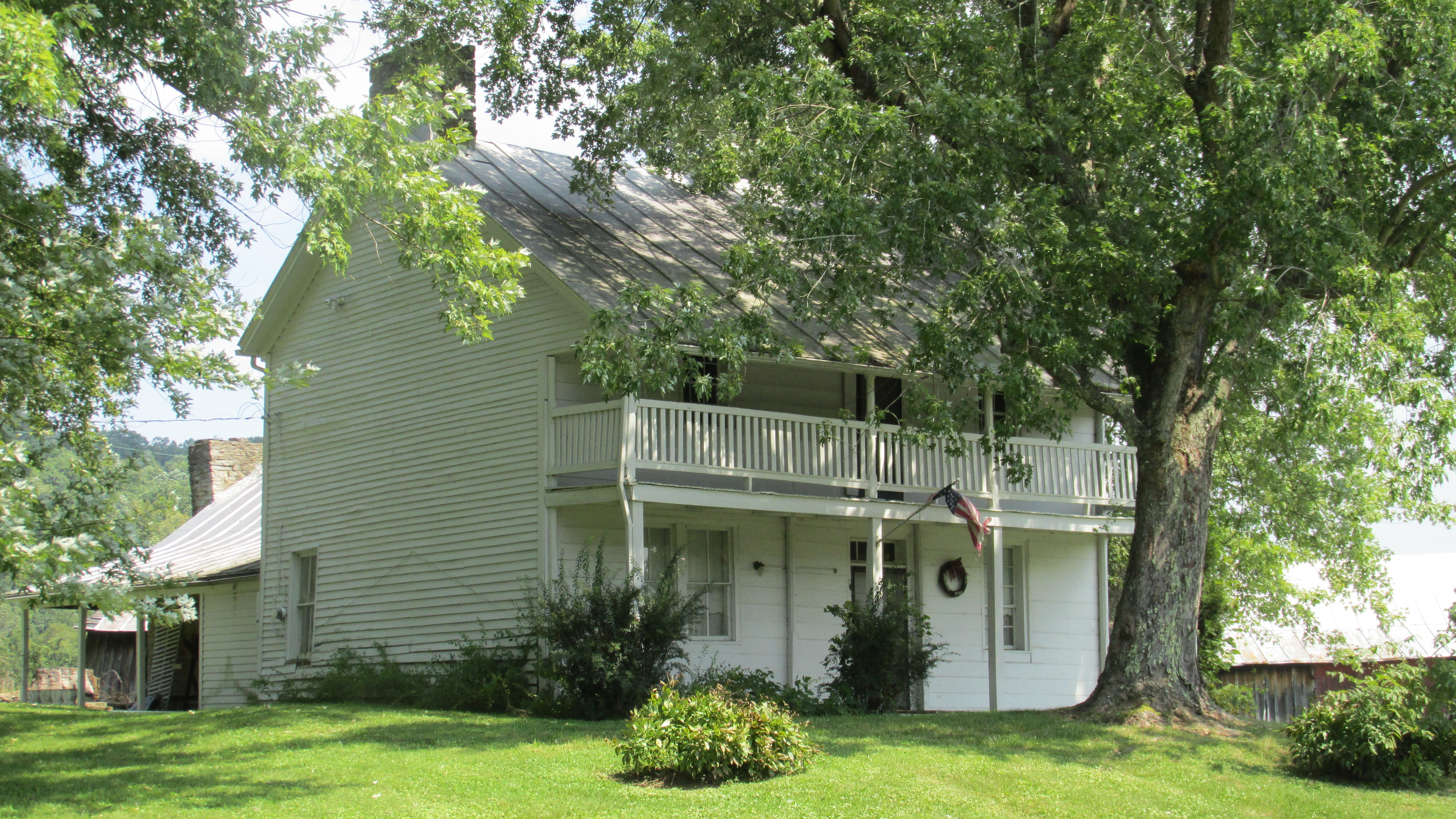
- Treber Inn on State Route 41

- Location in Adams County and the state of Ohio.
- Coordinates: 38°47′59″N 83°31′41″W
- Country: United States
- State: Ohio
- County: Adams

Area
  - Total: 51.3 sq mi (132.8 km^{2})
  - Land: 51.2 sq mi (132.6 km^{2})
  - Water: 0.077 sq mi (0.2 km^{2})
- Elevation: 837 ft (255 m)

Population (2020)
  - Total: 5,210
  - Density: 109/sq mi (41.9/km^{2})
- Time zone: UTC-5 (Eastern (EST))
  - Summer (DST): UTC-4 (EDT)
- FIPS code: 39-76768
- GNIS feature ID: 1085686
- Website: tiffintwpadams.us

Tiffin Township is one of the fifteen townships of Adams County, Ohio, United States. The population was 5,210 at the 2020 census.

== Geography ==
Located in the center of the county, it borders the following townships:

- Oliver Township - north
- Meigs Township- northeast
- Brush Creek Township - east
- Monroe Township - south
- Liberty Township - west
- Wayne Township - northwest

Most of the village of West Union, the county seat of Adams County, is located in southwestern Tiffin Township.

== Name and history ==
Tiffin Township was organized in 1806. It is named for Edward Tiffin, first Governor of Ohio.

Statewide, the only other Tiffin Township is located in Defiance County.

== Government ==
The township is governed by a three-member board of trustees, who are elected in November of odd-numbered years to a four-year term beginning on the following January 1. Two are elected in the year after the presidential election and one is elected in the year before it. There is also an elected township fiscal officer, who serves a four-year term beginning on April 1 of the year after the election, which is held in November of the year before the presidential election. Vacancies in the fiscal officership or on the board of trustees are filled by the remaining trustees.
