= Liberty Township, Adams County, Ohio =

Township in Ohio, US

- Township
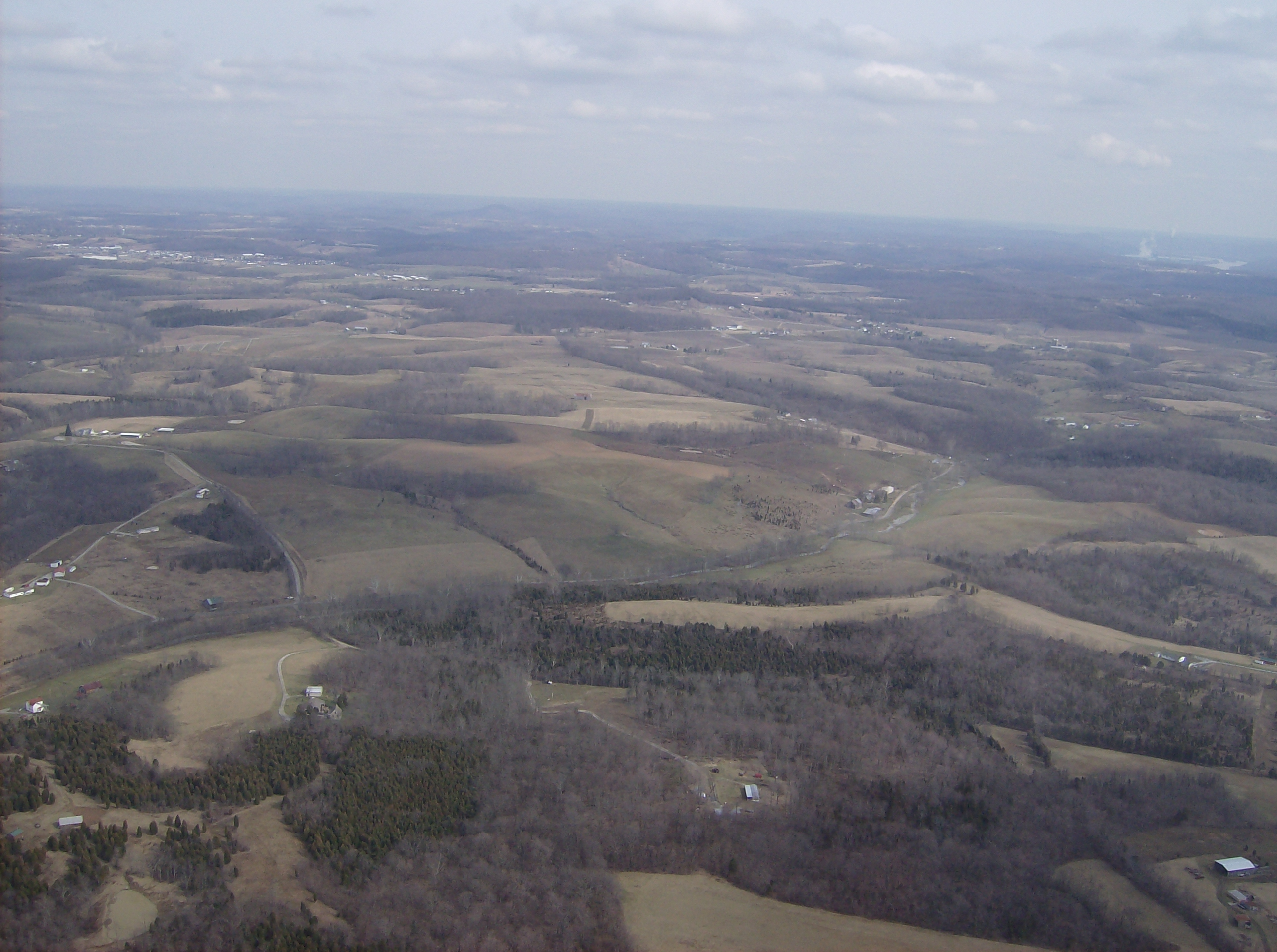
- Countryside in southeastern Liberty Township

- Location in Adams County and the state of Ohio.
- Coordinates: 38°48′42″N 83°37′44″W
- Country: United States
- State: Ohio
- County: Adams

Area
  - Total: 43.2 sq mi (111.9 km^{2})
  - Land: 43.2 sq mi (111.9 km^{2})
  - Water: 0 sq mi (0.0 km^{2})
- Elevation: 860 ft (262 m)

Population (2020)
  - Total: 2,065
  - Density: 46/sq mi (17.6/km^{2})
- Time zone: UTC-5 (Eastern (EST))
  - Summer (DST): UTC-4 (EDT)
- FIPS code: 39-43036
- GNIS feature ID: 1085679

Liberty Township is one of the fifteen townships of Adams County, Ohio, United States. The population was 2,065 at the 2020 census.

== Geography ==
Located in the western part of the county, it borders the following townships:

- Wayne Township - north
- Tiffin Township - east
- Monroe Township - southeast
- Sprigg Township - south
- Huntington Township, Brown County - southwest
- Byrd Township, Brown County - west

A small part of the village of West Union, the county seat of Adams County, is located in southeastern Liberty Township.

== History ==
Liberty Township was organized in 1817. It is one of twenty-five Liberty Townships statewide.

== Government ==
The township is governed by a three-member board of trustees, who are elected in November of odd-numbered years to a four-year term beginning on the following January 1. Two are elected in the year after the presidential election and one is elected in the year before it. There is also an elected township fiscal officer, who serves a four-year term beginning on April 1 of the year after the election, which is held in November of the year before the presidential election. Vacancies in the fiscal officership or on the board of trustees are filled by the remaining trustees.
