= Manchester, Ohio =

- Village
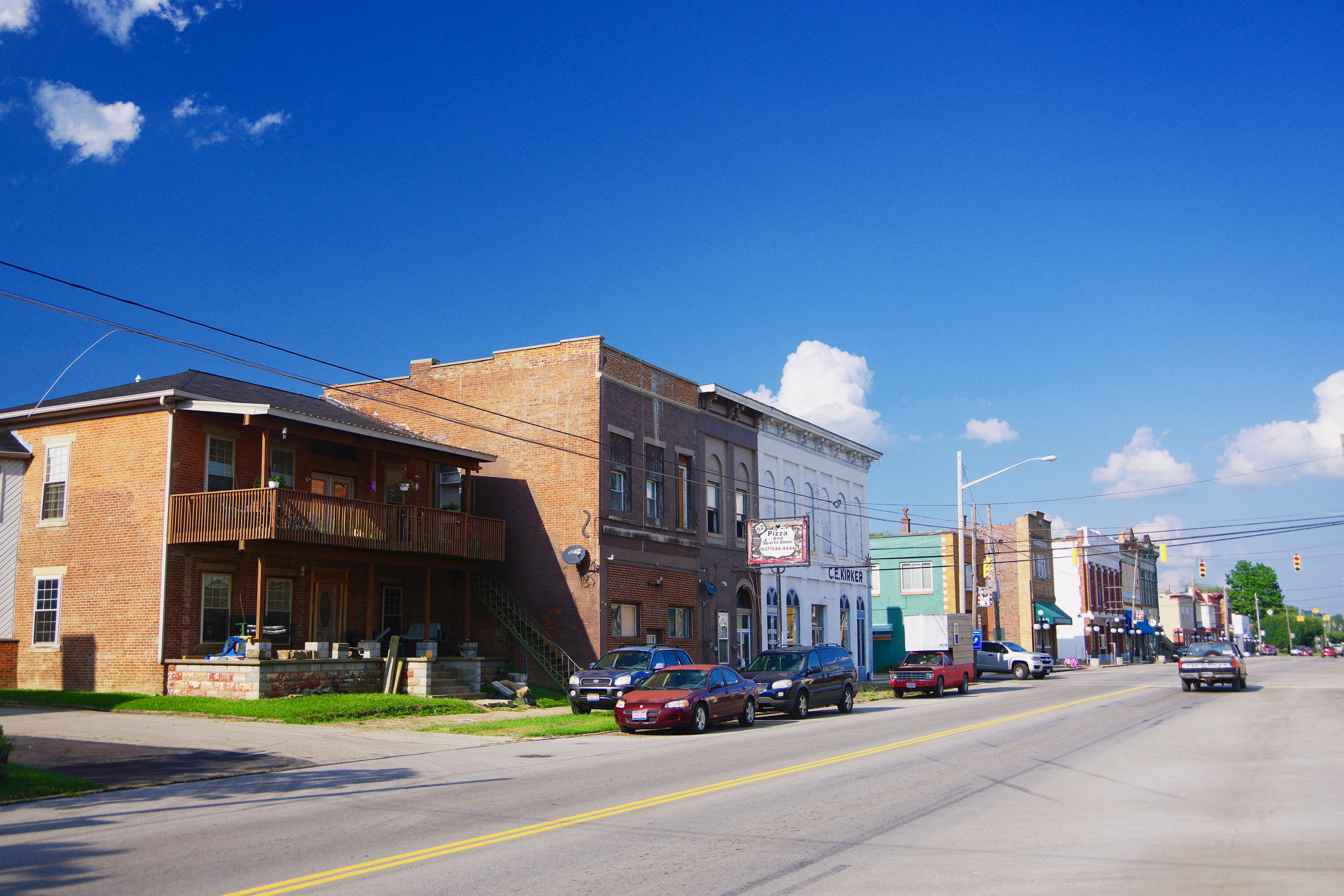
- Second Street (US 52)

- Logo

- Location in Manchester Township, Adams County and the state of Ohio.
- Coordinates: 38°41′05″N 83°36′53″W
- Country: United States
- State: Ohio
- County: Adams
- Township: Manchester
- Established: 1791
- Incorporated: 1850
- Named for: Manchester, England

Government
  - Mayor: Billie Jo (BJ) Goodwin

Area
  - Total: 1.29 sq mi (3.33 km^{2})
  - Land: 1.27 sq mi (3.28 km^{2})
  - Water: 0.019 sq mi (0.05 km^{2})
- Elevation: 512 ft (156 m)

Population (2020)
  - Total: 1,839
  - Estimate (2024): 1,858
  - Density: 1,451.0/sq mi (560.23/km^{2})
- Time zone: UTC-5 (Eastern (EST))
  - Summer (DST): UTC-4 (EDT)
- ZIP code: 45144
- Area codes: 937, 326
- FIPS code: 39-47012
- GNIS feature ID: 2399237
- Website: villageofmanchesterohio.com

Manchester is a village in Manchester Township, Adams County, Ohio, United States, along the Ohio River. The population was 1,839 at the 2020 census.

== History ==
The community was originally founded in 1790 as Massie's Station for Nathaniel Massie, an explorer and entrepreneur who first surveyed Virginia Military District. It was the first permanent settlement in the District. It was laid out along the Ohio River near three islands. In 1791, Massie's Station became known as Manchester, Ohio, after Manchester, England, Massie's ancestral home. It was the fourth permanent settlement established in the Northwest Territory. By 1791, residents had completely encircled the community with a stockade.

Manchester was incorporated as a village in 1850.

In 1933, after its bankruptcy, Alfred Holbrook College opened on the same campus as National Normal University, a teacher's college in Lebanon, Ohio. In 1933, Alfred Holbrook College moved to Manchester where it closed in 1941.

== Geography ==
According to the United States Census Bureau, the village has an area of 1.29 square miles (3.34 km^{2}), of which 1.28 square miles (3.32 km^{2}) is land and 0.01 square miles (0.03 km^{2}) is water.

Manchester is at the junction of U.S. Route 52 and Ohio State Route 136. Manchester is the approximate halfway point between Cincinnati and Huntington, West Virginia.

== Demographics ==
Historical population
Census	Pop.	Note	%±
1850	434		—
1870	942		—
1880	1,455		54.5%
1890	1,965		35.1%
1900	2,003		1.9%
1910	1,966		−1.8%
1920	1,824		−7.2%
1930	2,009		10.1%
1940	2,163		7.7%
1950	2,281		5.5%
1960	2,172		−4.8%
1970	2,195		1.1%
1980	2,313		5.4%
1990	2,223		−3.9%
2000	2,043		−8.1%
2010	2,023		−1.0%
2020	1,839		−9.1%
U.S. Decennial Census

=== 2010 census ===
As of the census of 2010, 2,023 people, 818 households, and 527 families resided in the village. The population density was 1,580.5 inhabitants per square mile (610.2/km^{2}). There were 1,032 housing units at an average density of 806.3 per square mile (311.3/km^{2}). The racial makeup of the village was 96.2% White, 0.2% African American, 0.4% Native American, 0.1% Asian, 0.7% from other races, and 2.4% from two or more races. Hispanic or Latino of any race were 1.7% of the population.

There were 818 households, of which 34.2% had children under the age of 18 living with them, 39.4% were married couples living together, 19.2% had a female householder with no husband present, 5.9% had a male householder with no wife present, and 35.6% were non-families. 30.3% of all households were made up of individuals, and 14.1% had someone living alone who was 65 years of age or older. The average household size was 2.47 and the average family size was 3.05.

The village's median age was 38.1 years. 26.7% of residents were under the age of 18; 7.5% were between the ages of 18 and 24; 23.9% were from 25 to 44; 26.4% were from 45 to 64; and 15.6% were 65 years of age or older. The village's gender makeup was 48.2% male and 51.8% female.

=== 2000 census ===
As of the census of 2000, 2,043 people, 882 households, and 555 families resided in the village. The population density was 1,894.5 inhabitants per square mile (731.5/km^{2}). There were 1,027 housing units at an average density of 952.4/mi^{2} (367.2/km^{2}). The racial makeup of the village was 97.50% White, 0.15% African American, 0.44% Native American, 0.24% Asian, 0.00% Pacific Islander, 0.05% from other races, and 1.62% from two or more races. Hispanic or Latino of any race were 0.34% of the population.

There were 882 households, out of which 29.0% had children under the age of 18 living with them, 42.0% were married couples living together, 15.3% had a female householder with no husband present, and 37.0% were non-families. 33.3% of all households were made up of individuals, and 18.8% had someone living alone who was 65 years of age or older. The average household size was 2.32 and the average family size was 2.92.

In the village, the population was spread out, with 25.0% under the age of 18, 9.5% from 18 to 24, 27.6% from 25 to 44, 21.1% from 45 to 64, and 16.7% who were 65 years of age or older. The median age was 37 years. For every 100 females, there were 89.2 males. For every 100 females age 18 and over, there were 85.1 males.

The village's median household income was $23,140, and the median income for a family was $28,641. Males had a median income of $29,539 versus $20,179 for females. The per capita income for the village was $13,535. About 19.1% of families and 23.3% of the population were below the poverty line, including 29.7% of those under the age of 18 and 23.3% of those 65 and older.

== Education ==
Manchester is served by the Manchester Local School District and the Manchester Public Library, a branch of the Adams County Public Library.

== Notable people ==
- Wayne Frye - Olympian, MIT graduate, Purple Heart Recipient
- Nathaniel Massie - General in the Revolutionary War, politician and first President of the Ohio Senate
- Jack Roush - founder, CEO, and owner of Roush Fenway Racing
- Doug White - a Republican politician and former President of the Ohio Senate

== Gallery ==
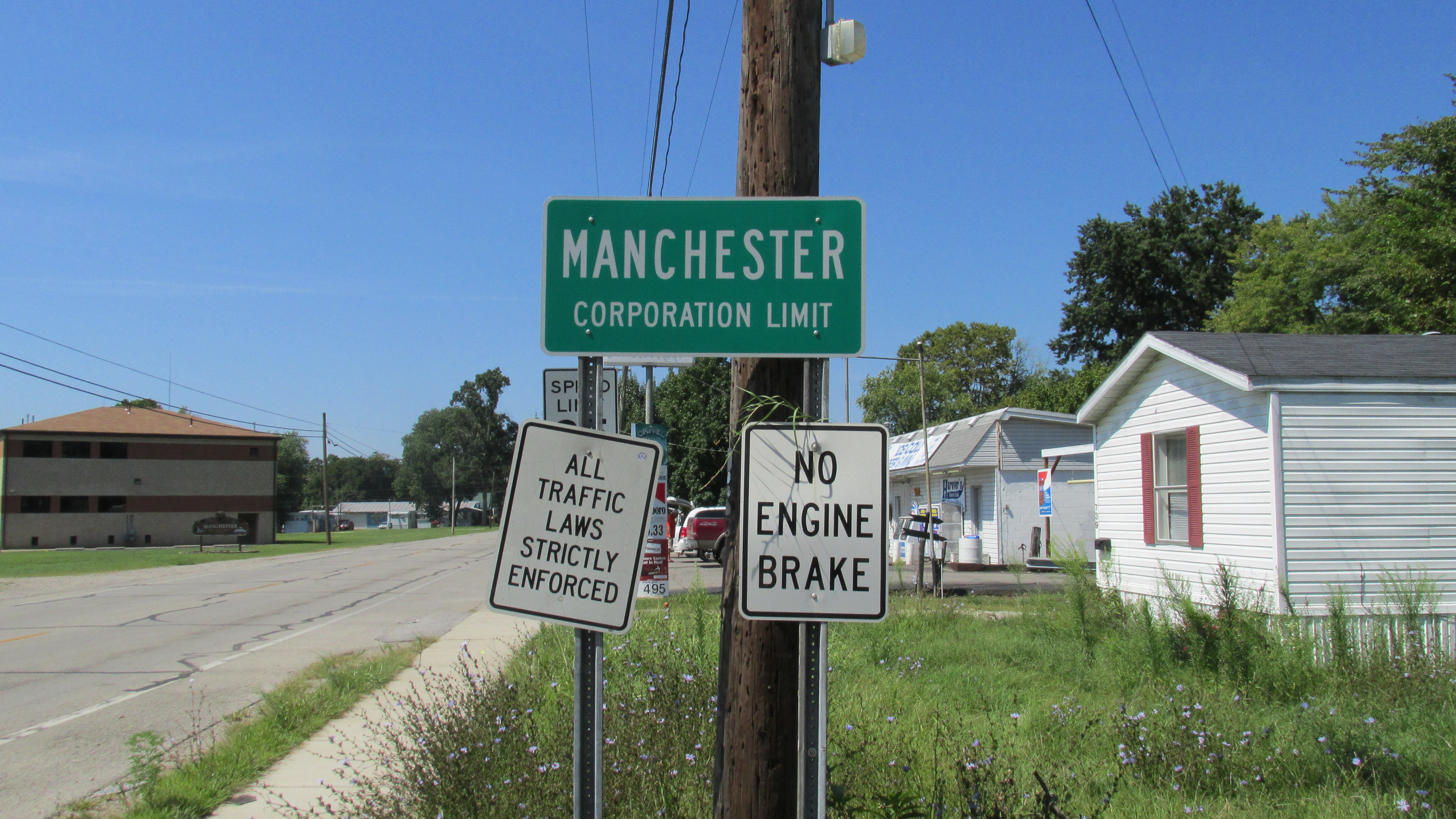
Manchester corporation limit sign.

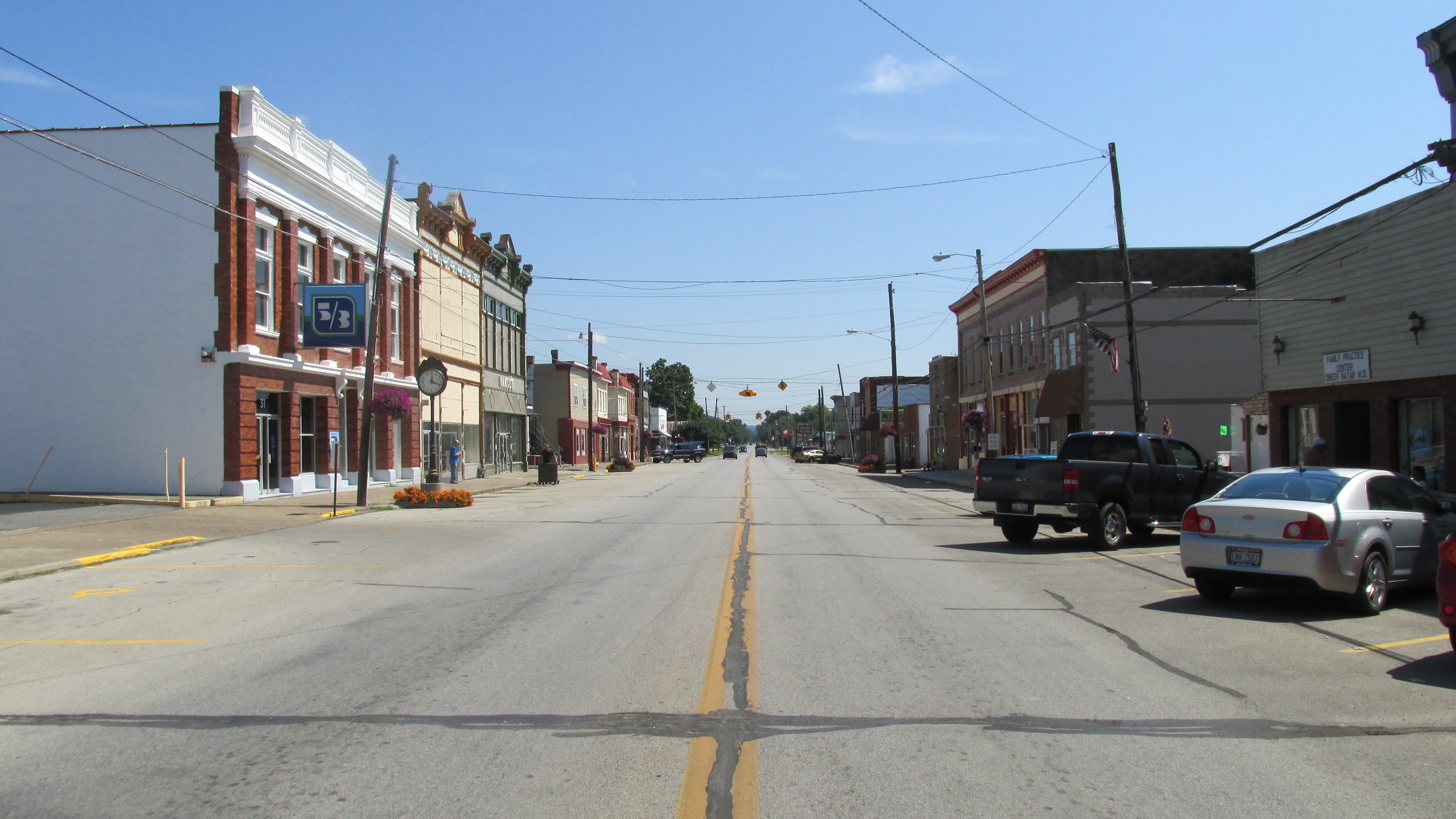
Looking east on Second Street (U.S. Highway 52) in Manchester.

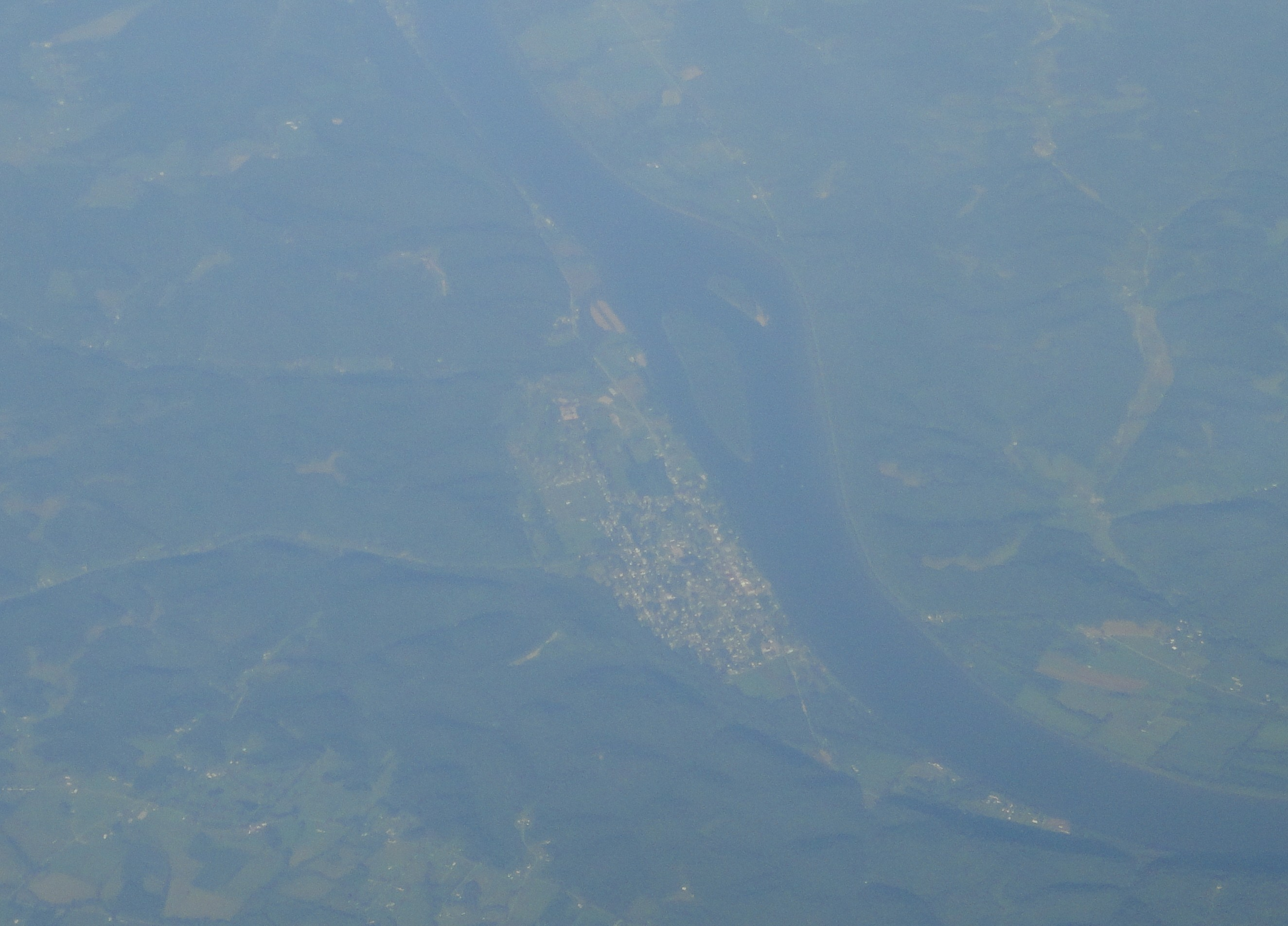
Aerial view of the village.

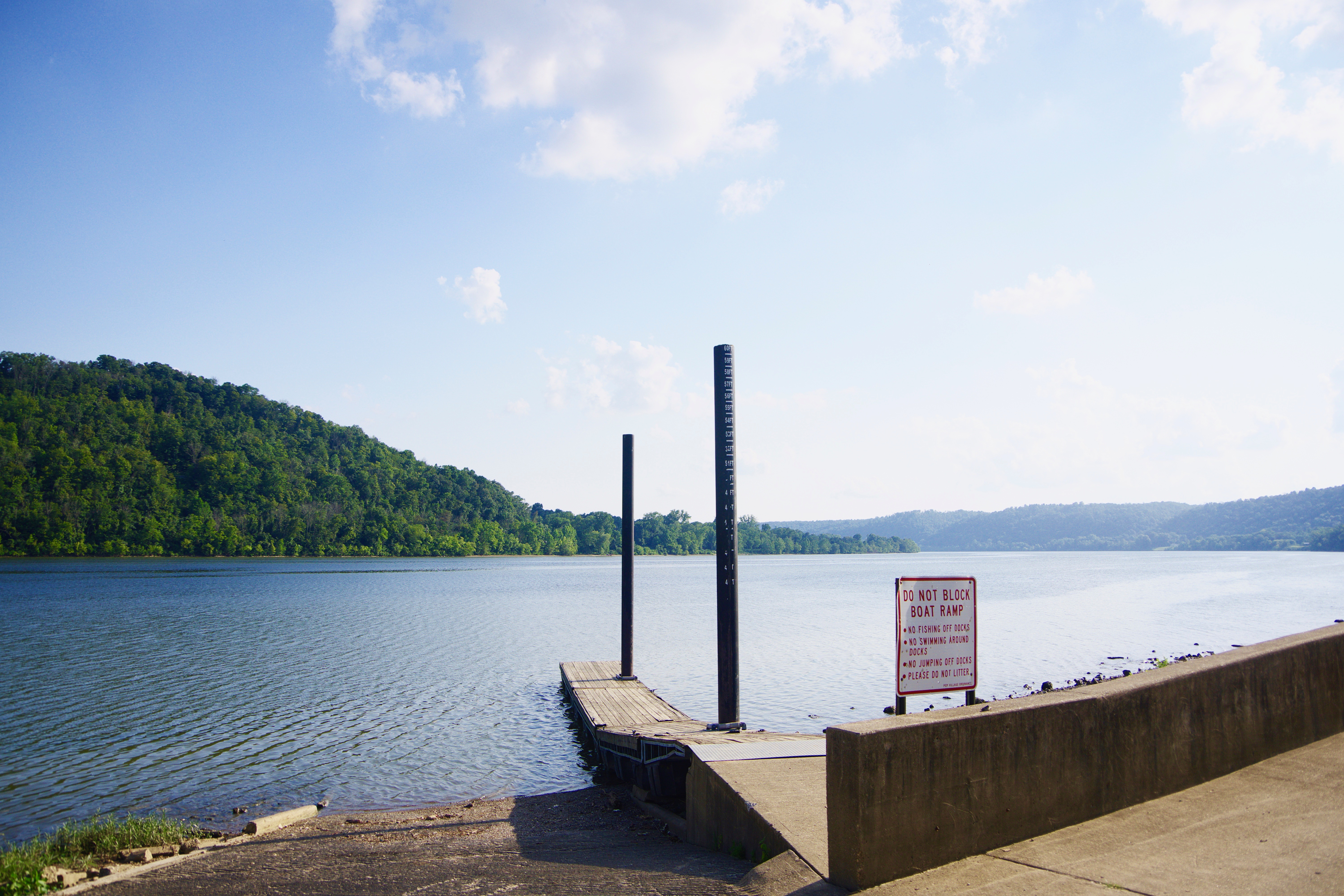
Public, Ohio River, boat ramp in downtown Manchester.

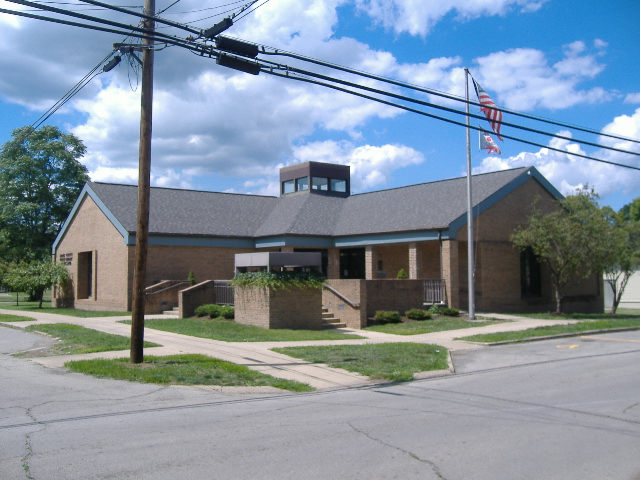
Manchester, Ohio Library.

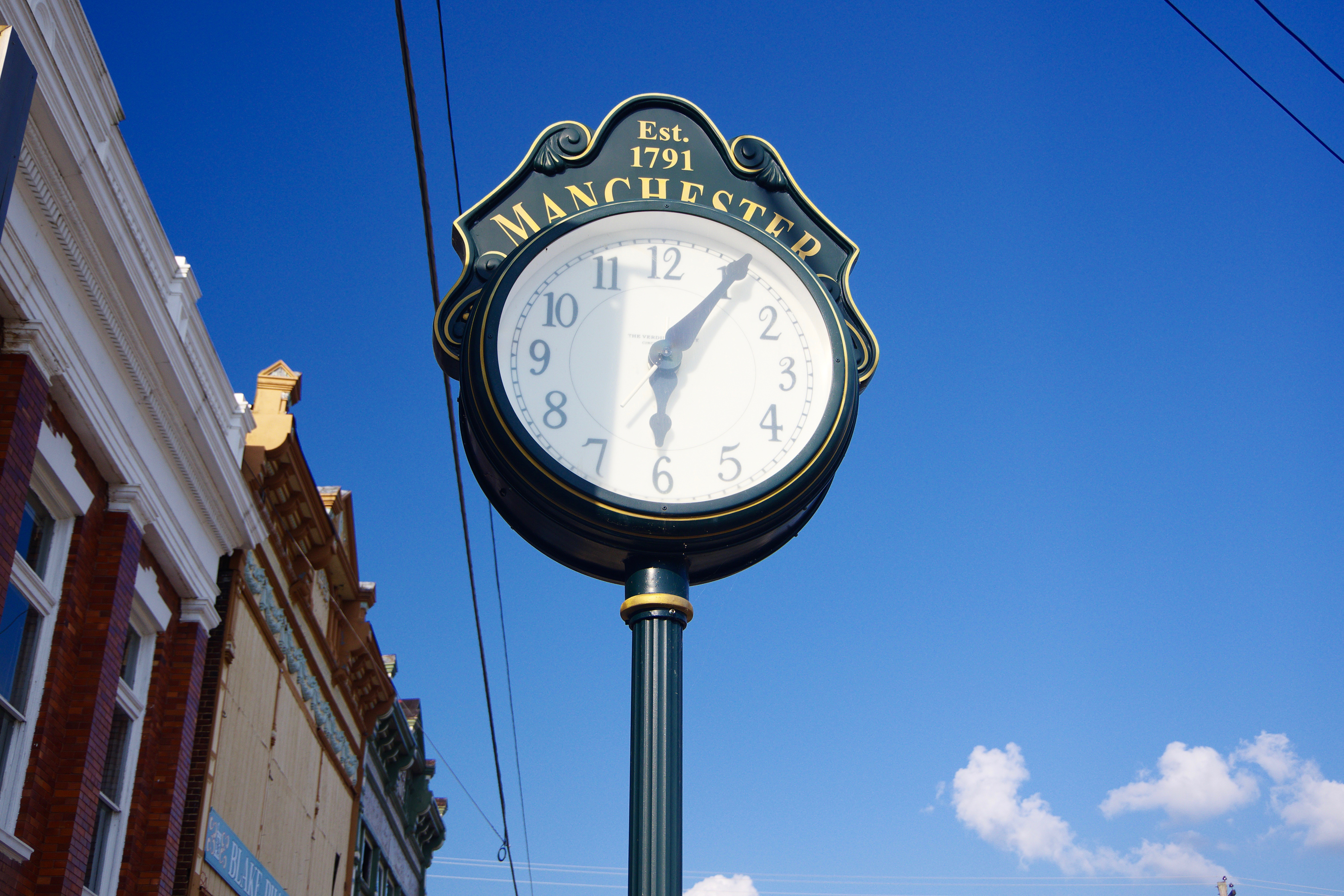
Downtown Manchester street clock.

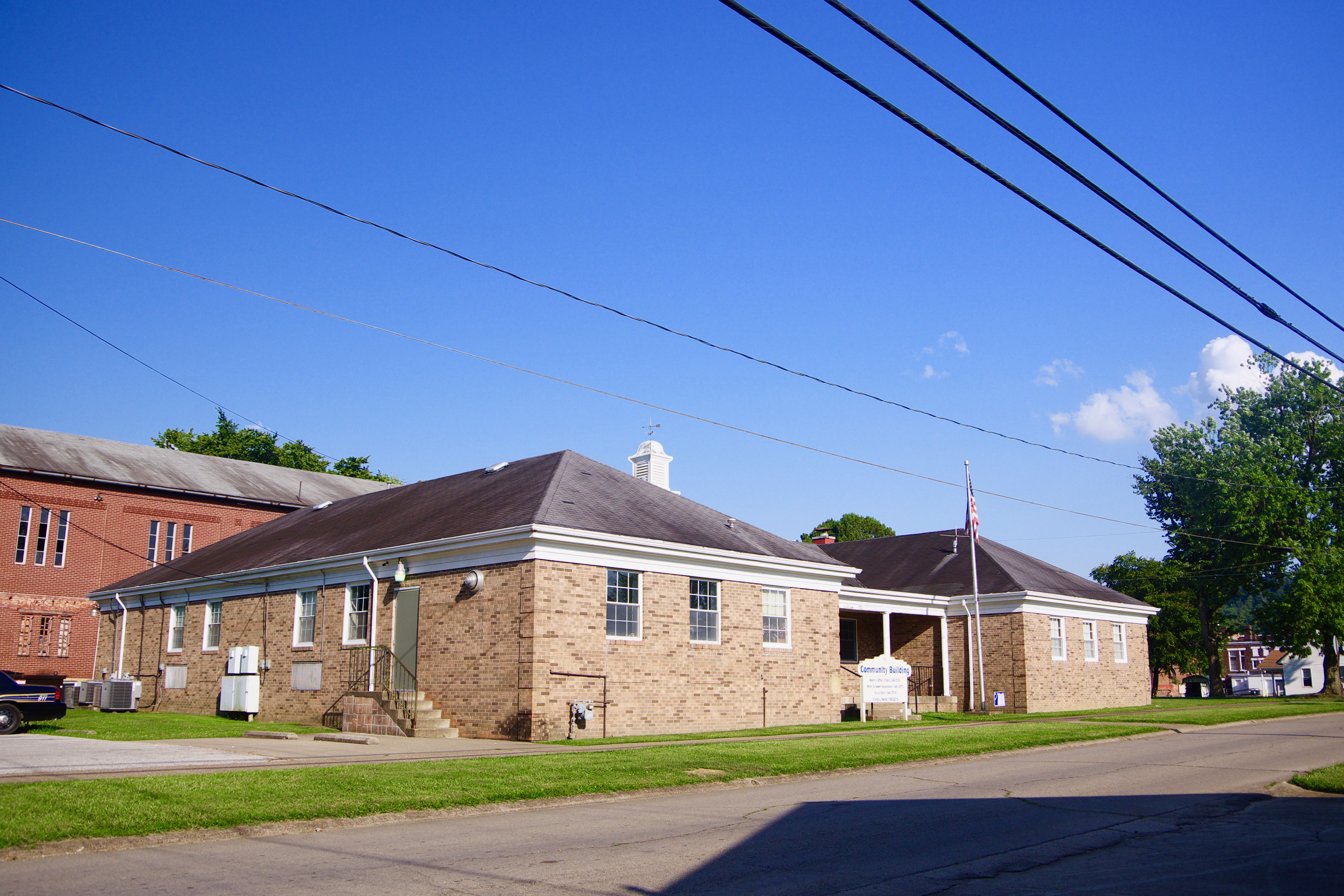
Manchester Community Building & government offices

== See also ==
- List of cities and towns along the Ohio River
