= Bradyville =

Bradyville or Bradysville may refer to:

- Bradysville, Ohio, an unincorporated community in Adams County
- Bradyville, Tennessee, an unincorporated community in Cannon County
- Bradyville, West Virginia, an unincorporated community
