= May Hill =

May Hill or Mayhill may refer to:

- May Hill, Gloucestershire, English hill
- May Hill (horse) (foaled 1972), British Thoroughbred racehorse and broodmare
- May Hill Stakes, Group 2 flat horse race in Doncaster, England
- May Hill Arbuthnot (1884–1969), born May Hill, American educator, editor, writer, and critic
- May Hill, Ohio, unincorporated community in Adams County, Ohio, U.S.
- May Hill Sandstone, geologic formation in Wales
- Mayhill, district of Swansea, Wales
- The Mayhill Hotel in Monmouth, Wales
- Monmouth Mayhill railway station in Monmouth, Wales
- Mayhill, New Mexico, unincorporated community in Otero County, New Mexico, U.S.

== See also ==
- Mayshill, hamlet in South Gloucestershire, England
- Mays Hill, New South Wales, suburb of Sydney, Australia
- Mary Hill (disambiguation)
- Margaret Hill (disambiguation)
