= Behm Mountain =

Landform in Adams County, Ohio

- Location within Ohio Location within the United States

Highest point
- Elevation: 1,089 ft (332 m)
- Coordinates: 38°50′13″N 83°20′57″W

Geography
- Location: Adams County, Ohio, United States
- Topo map: USGS Blue Creek

Behm Mountain is in Adams County, Ohio, and is a spur off the Coleman Ridge. Behm Mountain is located half a mile (800 metres) east of White Rock Road, north of Ohio State Route 348, between the communities of Fawcett and Wamsley.
