= Chaparral Prairie State Nature Preserve =

State Nature Preserve in Ohio, US

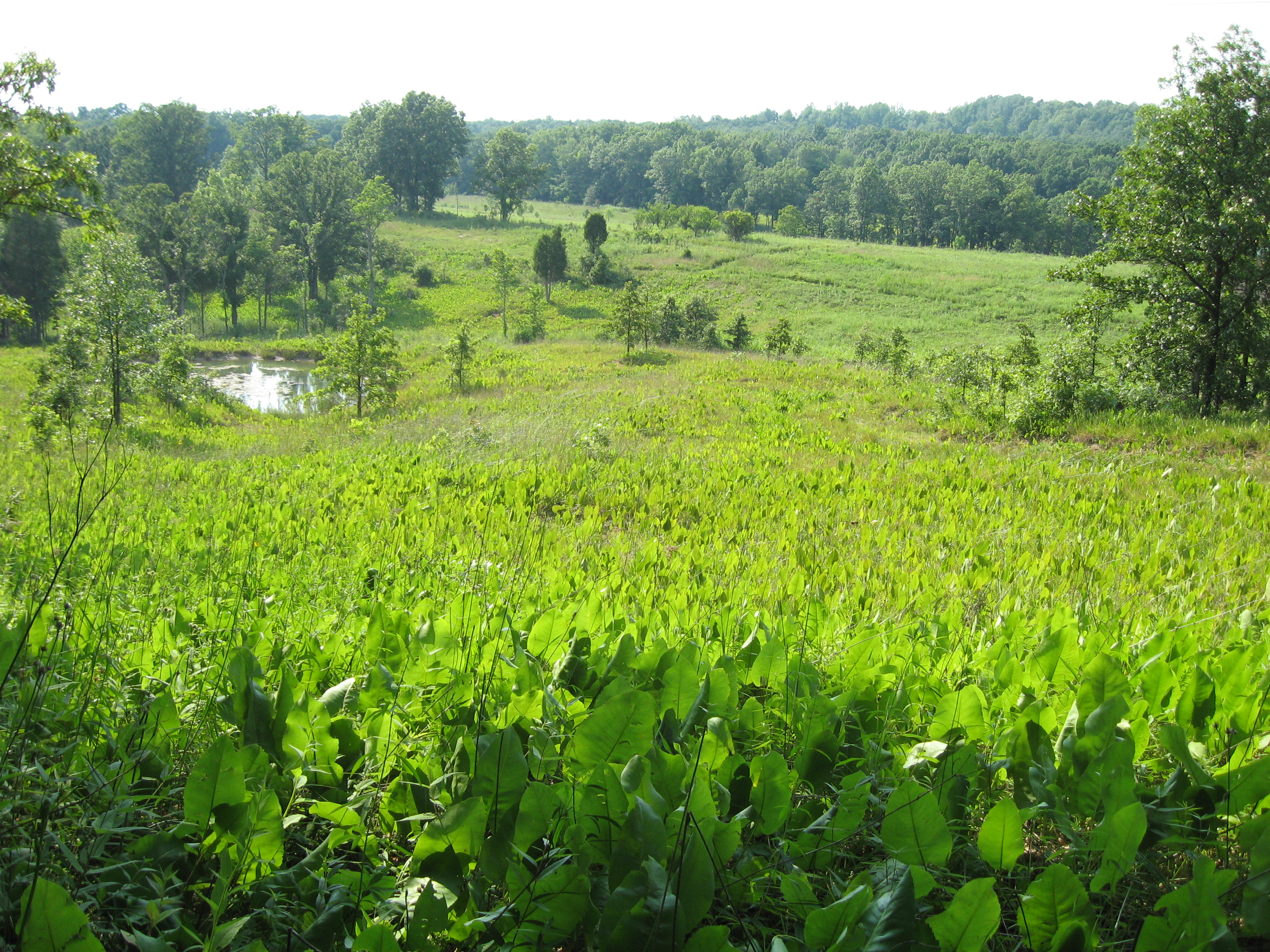
- View of Chaparral Prairie

- Location within Ohio Location within the United States
- Location: Adams County, Ohio
- Nearest city: West Union
- Coordinates: 38.8398°N 83.5749°W
- Area: 67 acres (27 ha)
- Website: naturepreserves.ohiodnr.gov/state-nature-preserves/find-a-state-nature-preserve/chaparral-prairie

Chaparral Prairie State Nature Preserve is a 67-acre (27 ha) nature preserve located in Adams County, Ohio, United States, near the city of West Union. The prairie is a remnant of what was once a larger ecosystem. These grassland openings were probably created by the extinct megafauna, such as mammoths and mastodons, that were once found in the area. Native American fires may have also played a role in maintaining this landscape. In modern times the prairie species found refuge on the dry, rocky openings in this part of the state. Today, controlled burns are used at Chaparral Prairie to keep woody species at bay.

Chaparral Prairie supports the most extensive population of rattlesnake-master in the state. Prairie dock and spiked blazing star are also unusually abundant at this site, as well as eleven state-endangered species, including Blue False Indigo. Post oak, blackjack oak, and eastern redcedar are the most common trees surviving in the prairie, and little bluestem is the dominant prairie grass. The rare Edward's hairstreak butterfly has also been observed. The preserve is open to the public, and contains a 0.75-mile (1.21 km) trail with bulletin board, interpretive signs and a parking lot.

While the Ohio Department of Natural Resources owns part of the preserve, designated in 1985, the Arc of Appalachia (a conservation nonprofit) was responsible for the acquisition of 60 of the preserve's 130 total acres. With the help of Clean Ohio funds, the Arc purchased these 60 acres in 2015, expanding the preserve. The ODNR's Division of Natural Areas and Preserves manages this land in addition to the rest of Chaparral Prairie State Nature Preserve. Their duties include routine controlled burns, trail maintenance, and non-native invasive species removal.
