= Harshaville Covered Bridge =

- U.S. National Register of Historic Places
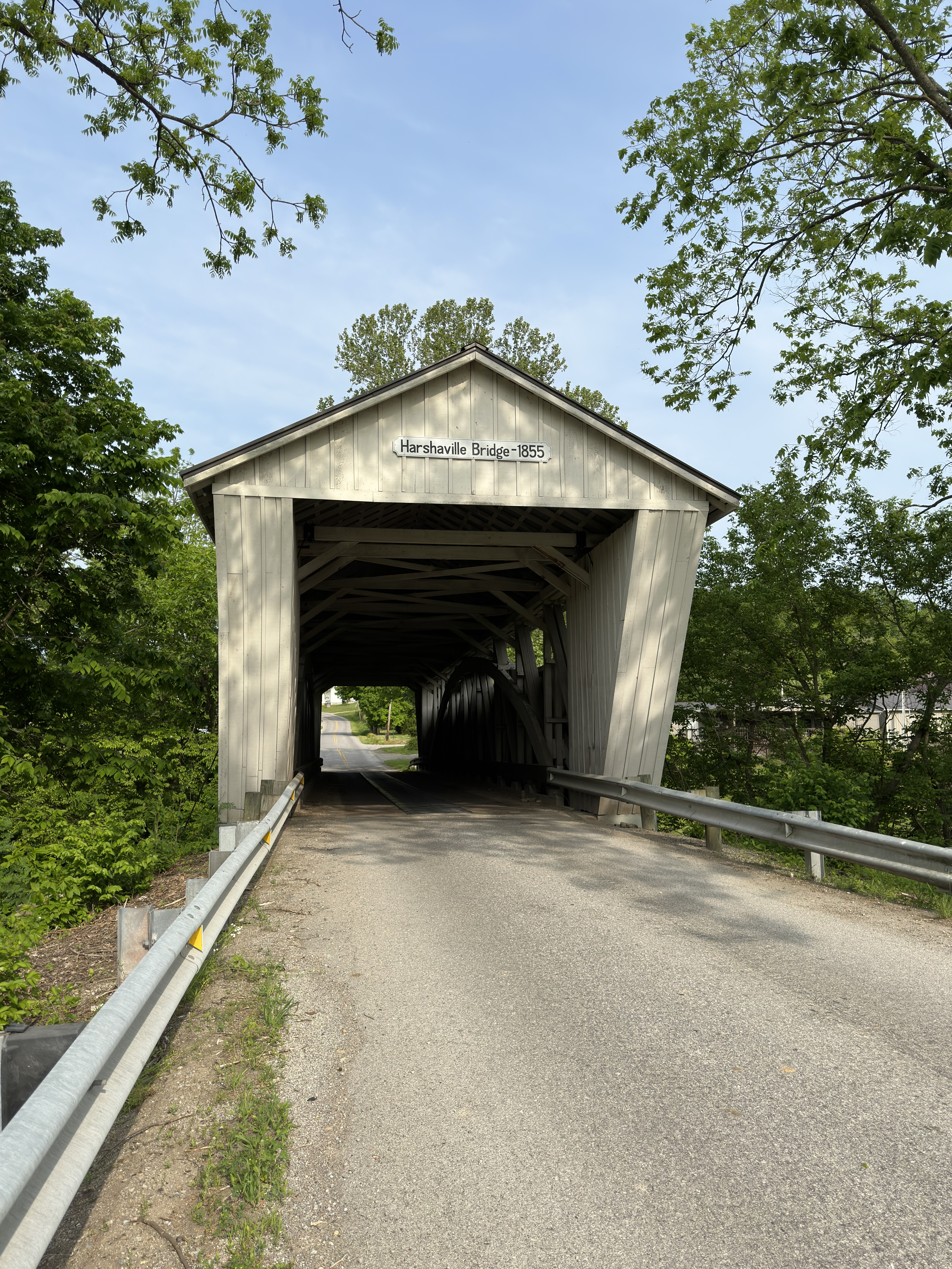

- Location within Ohio Location within the United States
- Location: Harshaville, Ohio
- Coordinates: 38°54′28″N 83°32′40″W
- Area: less than one acre
- Architectural style: Burr truss covered bridge
- NRHP reference No.: 76001357
- Added to NRHP: March 16, 1976

The Harshaville Covered Bridge is a historic covered bridge spanning the Cherry Fork Creek at Harshaville, Adams County, Ohio, United States. Built in 1855, it is a Burr truss bridge with a 110-foot span. It has sheet metal siding, a metal roof and stone abutments. It was listed on the National Register of Historic Places in 1976.

The Ohio Historic Places Dictionary has described it as "an outstanding example" of a Burr truss bridge. The name reflects the community, which was named for the Harsha family that built a mill there. In the summer of 1863, in a campaign known as Morgan's Raid, raiders from the Confederate States Army led by John Hunt Morgan ransacked the Harshaville general store and burned many bridges, but spared the Harshaville Covered Bridge.

In June 2010, the Ohio Department of Transportation received a $100,000 grant from the Federal Highway Administration to rehabilitate the bridge. The County planned to replace the bridge's metal siding with historically correct wood siding and to replace the metal roof and failed backwall. Tom Cross, executive director of the Adams County Travel and Visitor's Bureau, noted, "Once this work is completed, this bridge will look like new."
