= Youngsville =

Youngsville is the name of some places in the United States of America:

- Youngsville, Louisiana
- Youngsville, New Mexico, on State Rt. 96, northwest of Española
- Youngsville, North Carolina
- Youngsville, Ohio, an unincorporated community
- Youngsville, Pennsylvania
