= Adams Lake State Park =

Park in Ohio, USA

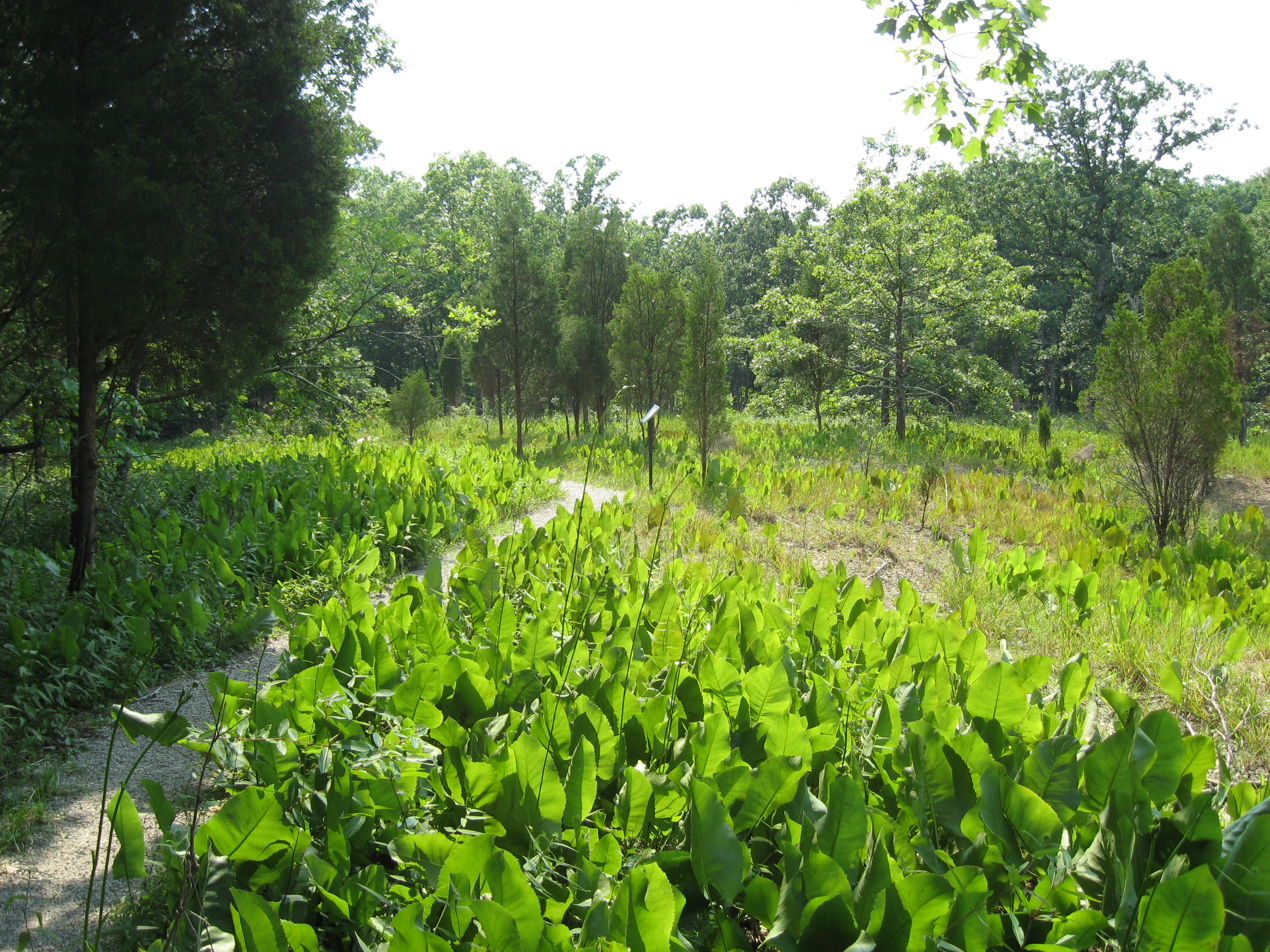
- Adams Lake Trail

- Location within Ohio Location within the United States
- Interactive map of Adams Lake State Park
- Location: Adams County, Ohio, United States
- Coordinates: 38°48′51″N 83°31′36″W
- Area: Land: 49 acres (20 ha); Water: 47 acres (19 ha)
- Elevation: 764 feet (233 m)
- Established: 1950
- Administrator: Ohio Department of Natural Resources
- Designation: Ohio state park
- Website: Adams Lake State Park

Adams Lake State Park is a public recreation area that surrounds Adams Lake on the far northern edge of the village of West Union, Adams County, Ohio, in the United States. The park's 96 acres (39 ha) are equally divided between land and water and include a rare dry-prairie remnant, Adams Lake Prairie State Nature Preserve. The park offers fishing, boating, picnicking, and hiking.

== History ==
Adams Lake was created to supply drinking water to the village of West Union, the county seat of Adams County. When ownership of the lake and its surrounding land was transferred to the state of Ohio in 1950, Adams Lake State Park was founded.

== Ecology ==
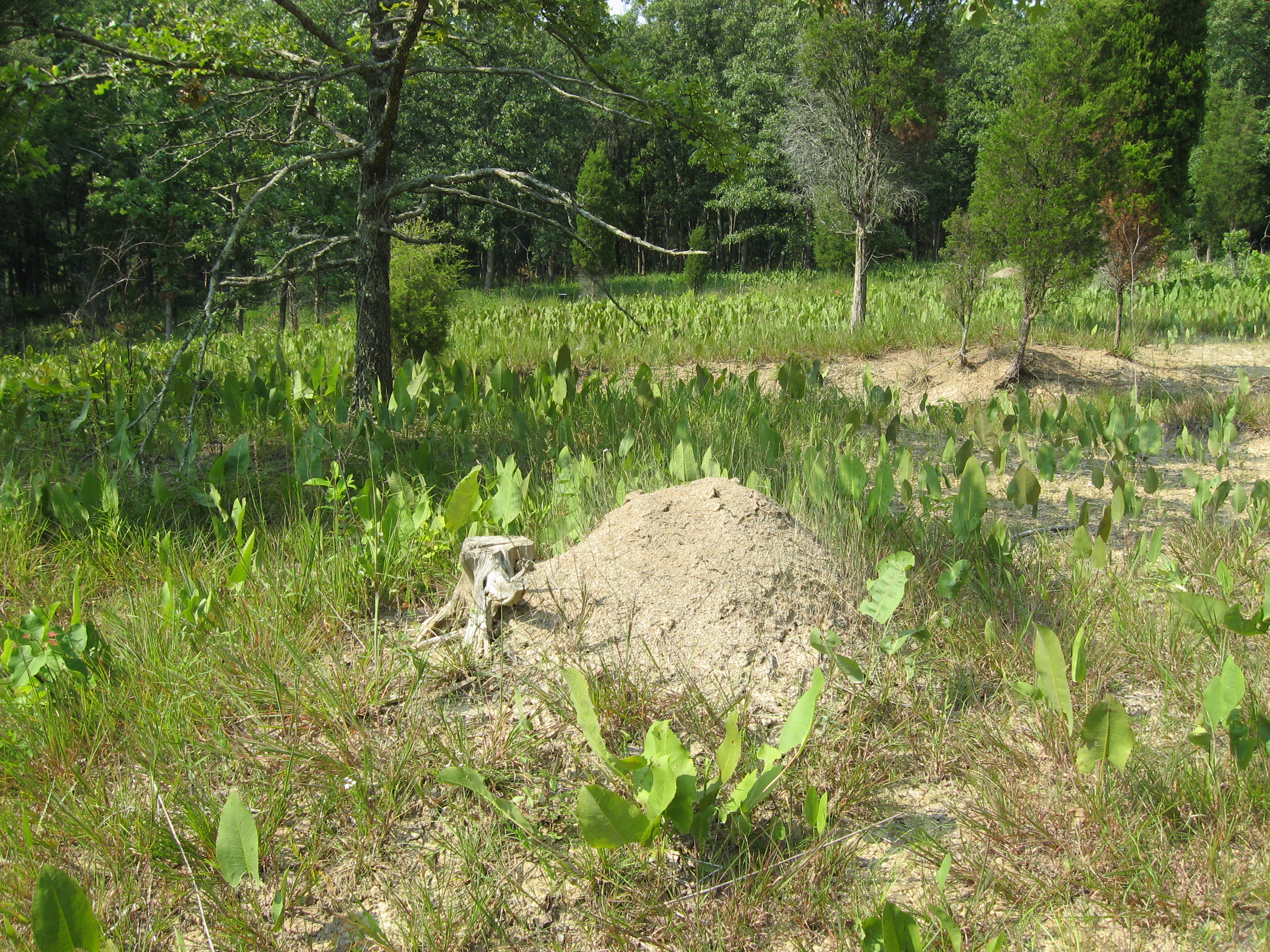
Allegheny mound ants are common at the preserve.

The park is home to one of the last pockets of prairie habitat in Ohio. Native American and naturally caused fires, grazing by megafauna, and periodic severe droughts may have played a role in maintaining this landscape. Plants found in this disjunct area of prairie include purple coneflower, prairie dock, and little bluestem flowers.

The Adams Lake prairie is a dry, sparsely vegetated area. The only trees in the prairie opening are sporadically occurring red cedar, post oak, and others which can survive the extreme soil conditions. Rare plants in the prairie include cylindrical blazing star, scaly blazing star, rattlesnake-master and blackjack oak.

== Activities and amenities ==
The 47-acre (19 ha) lake offers swimming, Basketball, Disc Golf, boating (electric motors), and boat launch and provides a habitat for bluegill, channel catfish, carp, bullhead, and largemouth bass. Park amenities include picnicking areas, walking path, and trails through the nature preserve.
