= Eckmansville, Ohio =

Unincorporated community in Ohio, U.S.

Coordinates: 38°51′57″N 83°38′34″W

Eckmansville is an unincorporated community in Adams County, in the U.S. state of Ohio.

== History ==
A post office called Eckmansville was established in 1839. The town site was platted around 1850. The community was named for its proprietor, Henry Eckman.
