= Louden, Ohio =

Unincorporated community in Ohio, U.S.

Coordinates: 39°01′36″N 83°27′10″W

Louden is an unincorporated community in Bratton Township, Adams County, in the U.S. state of Ohio. Its elevation is 784 feet above sea level. Serpent Mound Historical Site is located just east within sight of Louden on State Route 73, formerly known as the Hillsboro-Portsmouth road. Louden Road runs south from State Route 73 within the hamlet.

== History ==
Louden is a hamlet that was begun around Lovett's store in 1839. Never regularly laid out, its origin was when Edmund Lovett (born 1815) sold small parcels of land for residences and shops. The community was named after Loudoun County, Virginia, the native home of a large share of the early settlers. The post office Louden once had was called Lovett's. This post office was established in 1844, and remained in operation until 1907. Earlier in its history, the hamlet's name was spelled Loudon.
