= Unity, Adams County, Ohio =

Unincorporated community in Ohio, U.S.

Coordinates: 38°53′30″N 83°31′24″W

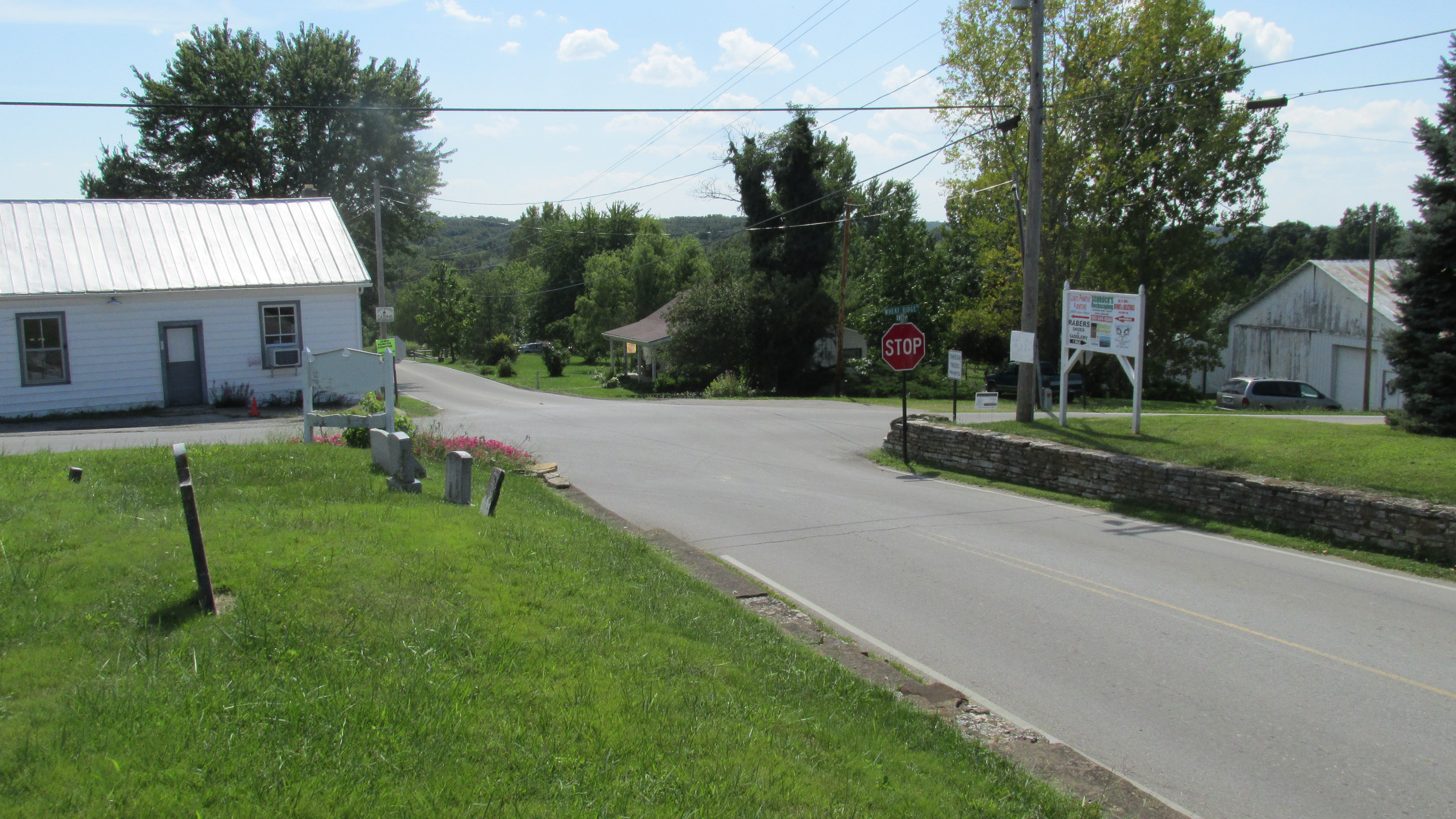
Intersection of Unity Road and Wheat Ridge Road in Unity, Ohio

Unity is an unincorporated community in Adams County, Ohio, United States.

== History ==
The post office, once located at Unity, was first called Wheat Ridge, then Wheat. This post office was established in 1851 and remained in operation until 1906.

== See also ==
Unity, Columbiana County, Ohio
