= Louisville, Adams County, Ohio =

Unincorporated community in Ohio, U.S.

Coordinates: 38°59′34″N 83°27′52″W

Louisville is an unincorporated community in Adams County, in the U.S. state of Ohio.

== History ==
Louisville was laid out in 1838. The community Louisville once had was called Gustin. The Gustin post office was established in 1850, and remained in operation until 1865.
