= Steam Furnace, Ohio =

Unincorporated community in Ohio, U.S.

Coordinates: 38°54′21″N 83°24′30″W

Steam Furnace is an unincorporated community in Adams County, in the U.S. state of Ohio.

== History ==
The community was named for the steam-powered blast furnace once located there.
