= Marble Furnace, Ohio =

Unincorporated community in Ohio, U.S.

Coordinates: 38°58′30″N 83°25′39″W

Marble Furnace is an unincorporated community in Adams County, Ohio.

== History ==
Marble Furnace was founded c. 1812. The community took its name from Marble Furnace, a blast furnace. A post office called Marble Furnace was established in 1848, and remained in operation until 1879.
