= Jaybird, Ohio =

Unincorporated community in Ohio, U.S.

Coordinates: 38°56′22″N 83°17′54″W

Jaybird is an unincorporated community in Adams County, in the U.S. state of Ohio.

== History ==
A post office called Jaybird was established in 1881, and remained in operation until 1931. Jaybird once had its own school.
