= Selig, Ohio =

Unincorporated community in Ohio, U.S.

Coordinates: 38°44′25″N 83°21′12″W

Selig is an unincorporated community in Adams County, in the U.S. state of Ohio.

== History ==
A post office called Selig was established in 1886, and remained in operation until 1907. The community has the name of Hugo Selig, a local merchant.
