= Beasley Fork, Ohio =

- Unincorporated community
- Location within Ohio Location within the United States
- Coordinates: 38°44′59″N 83°30′59″W
- Country: United States
- State: Ohio
- County: Adams
- Elevation: 574 ft (175 m)
- Time zone: UTC-5 (Eastern (CST))
  - Summer (DST): UTC-4 (EDT)
- Area codes: 937 & 326
- GNIS feature ID: 1064396

Beasley Fork is an unincorporated community in Adams County, in the U.S. state of Ohio.

== History ==
A post office called Beasleys Fork was established in 1855 and remained in operation until 1902. The community has the name of Beasley Fork, a tributary of Ohio Brush Creek. Charles Stevenson had family members living in the community; his son, William Stevenson, and his wife, Hannah Miller, his son Charles and his wife, Christina Collings, and Mary Stevenson. Charles Fields was one of the community's first settlers. James Collings built a house that overlooked the valley but is no longer there. Another log cabin was built on the ridge east of the community's turnpike by General Darlinton. Union Methodist Episcopal Church was organized in 1856, while Beasley's Fork Christian Church was organized in 1864, with the present-day building being erected in 1871. Nathaniel Foster Sr. also settled in the community. Elliot H. Collins was a member of the local Christian church. The first infirmary in the county was founded on G.L. Compton's farm in March 1837. It covered 211 acres (85 ha) of land and was sold for $2 million. Henry Smith bought 300 acres (120 ha) of land at the mouth of the river. Leonard Cole grew up in the community and his house overlooked the valley. Edward Burbage purchased a farm in the community, as well. James Miller was the community's postmaster. John Knox also owned a home in the community. James Hemphill settled in the community in 1797. Robert A. Mitchell was born in Beasley's Fork, and his father owned and operated a sawmill and gristmill.

== Geography ==
Beasley Fork is located at the mouth of Beasley's Fork in Green and Jefferson Townships. Beasley Fork is the home of a glen that is noted for its redbud coves and its redbird inhabitants.

== Education ==
Beasley Fork is served by the Adams County/Ohio Valley School District. Children in the community attend West Union Elementary School and West Union High School in nearby West Union.
