= Tranquility, Ohio =

Unincorporated community in Ohio, U.S.

Coordinates: 38°57′45″N 83°31′59″W

Tranquility is an unincorporated community in Adams County, in the U.S. state of Ohio.

== History ==
Tranquility had its start in the 1830s when a country store opened there. A post office was established at Tranquility in 1848, and remained in operation until 1912.
