= Jacksonville, Adams County, Ohio =

Unincorporated community in Ohio, U.S.

Coordinates: 38°54′29″N 83°26′24″W

Jacksonville is an unincorporated community in Adams County, in the U.S. state of Ohio.

== History ==
Jacksonville was laid out in 1815, and named for Andrew Jackson (1767–1845), an officer in the War of 1812 and afterward seventh President of the United States. A post office was established as Jacksonville in 1820, the name was changed to Dunbarton in 1827, and the post office closed in 1909.
