= Mineral Springs, Ohio =

Unincorporated community in Ohio, U.S.

Coordinates: 38°53′13″N 83°19′46″W

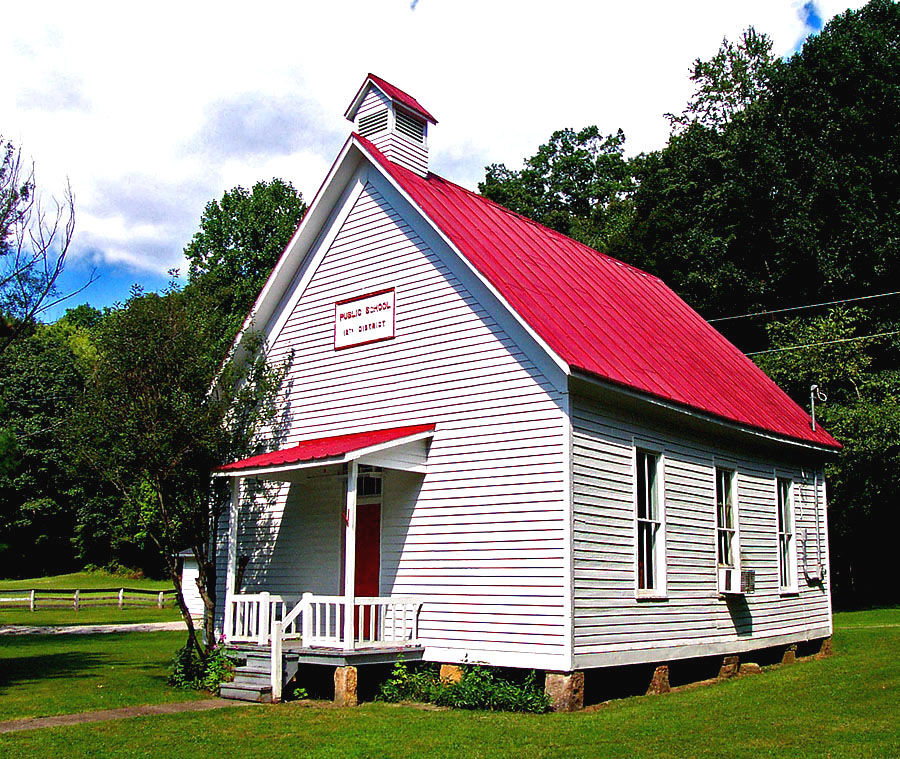
Preserved one-room schoolhouse in Mineral Springs (2005)

Mineral Springs is an unincorporated community in Adams County, Ohio, United States.

== History ==
A post office called Mineral Springs was established in 1868 and remained in operation until 1919. The community was named for a mineral spa near it.

== Geography ==
it is located in Adams, County OH,

== Geology ==
It is in the deep valleys Southern Ohio Hill Country near the edge of the Appalachian Plateau, the area features karst topography where exposed Paleozoic Bedrock predominantly limestone and dolomite allows for deep aquifers to breach the surface. The Spring Fed https://www/mineralspringslakeresort.com sits in a region famous for its high geological diversity and exceptional water clarity.
