= Cedar Mills, Ohio =

Unincorporated community in Ohio, U.S.

Coordinates: 38°49′23″N 83°23′34″W

Cedar Mills is an unincorporated community in Adams County, in the U.S. state of Ohio.

== History ==
A post office was established at Cedar Mills in 1868 and remained operational until 1909. The community had an iron mill on Cedar Run, hence the name.

An F1 tornado struck Cedar Mills on May 31, 1985.
