= Fairview, Adams County, Ohio =

Unincorporated community in Ohio, U.S.

Coordinates: 38°48′26″N 83°38′53″W

Fairview is an unincorporated community in Adams County, in the U.S. state of Ohio.

== History ==
Fairview was laid out in 1844. The post office Fairview once had was called Hill's Fork. The Hill's Fork post office was established in 1857, and remained in operation until 1904.
