= Harshaville, Ohio =

- Unincorporated community
- Location within Ohio Location within the United States
- Coordinates: 38°54′29″N 83°32′40″W
- Country: United States
- State: Ohio
- County: Adams
- Elevation: 725 ft (221 m)
- Time zone: UTC-5 (Eastern (EST))
  - Summer (DST): UTC-4 (EDT)
- Area codes: 937, 326
- GNIS feature ID: 1064803

Harshaville, Ohio (also known as Harshasville) is an unincorporated community in Adams County, Ohio, USA, in the southern part of the state.

Harshaville was built up around the early Harsha Mill, a gristmill powered by the Cherry Fork Creek. The community was named for the local Harsha family. A post office was established at Harshaville in 1865, and remained in operation until 1909.

It is the location of Harshaville Covered Bridge, a historic bridge that is listed on the National Register of Historic Places.

== Gallery ==
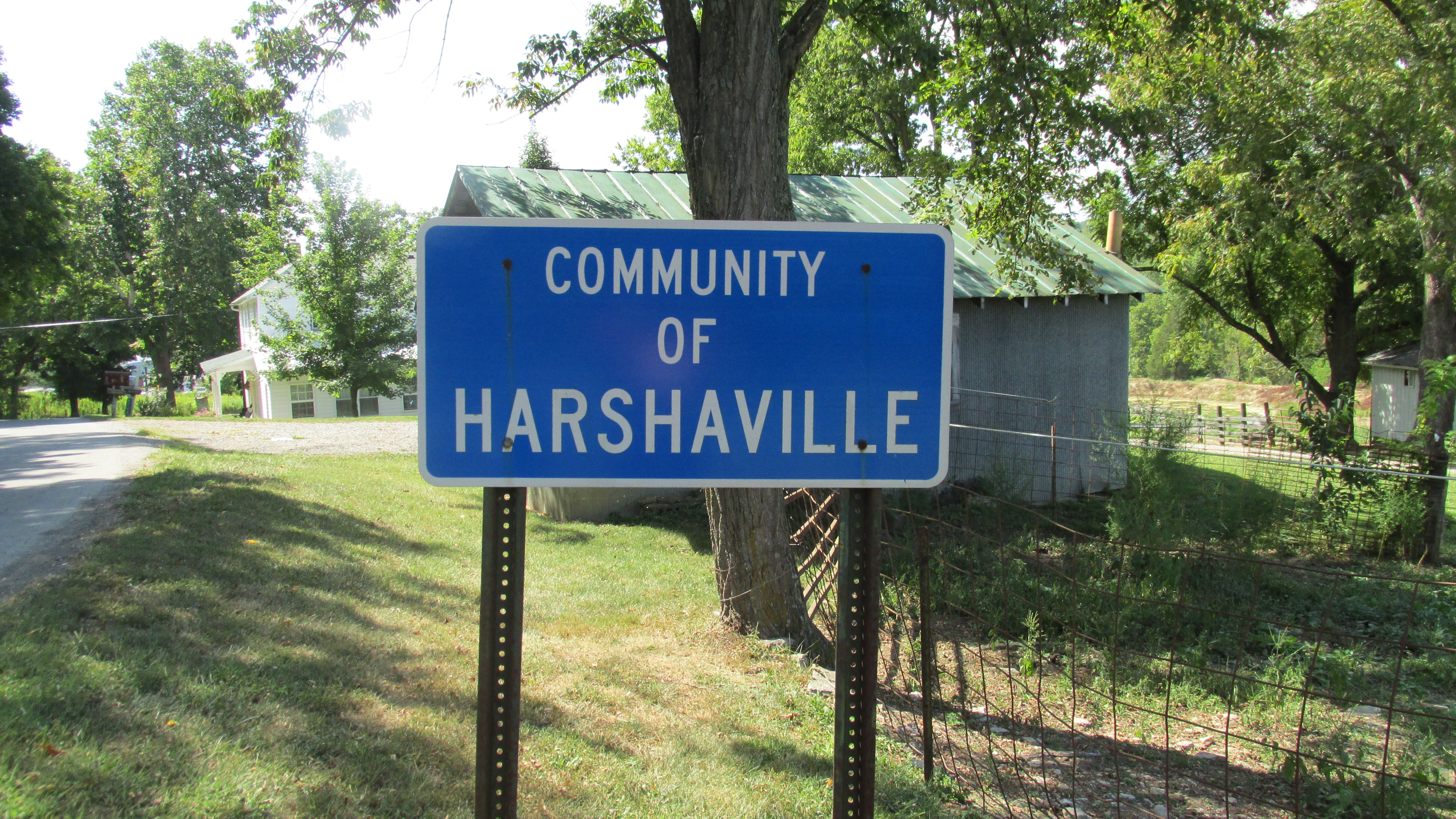
Harshaville community sign

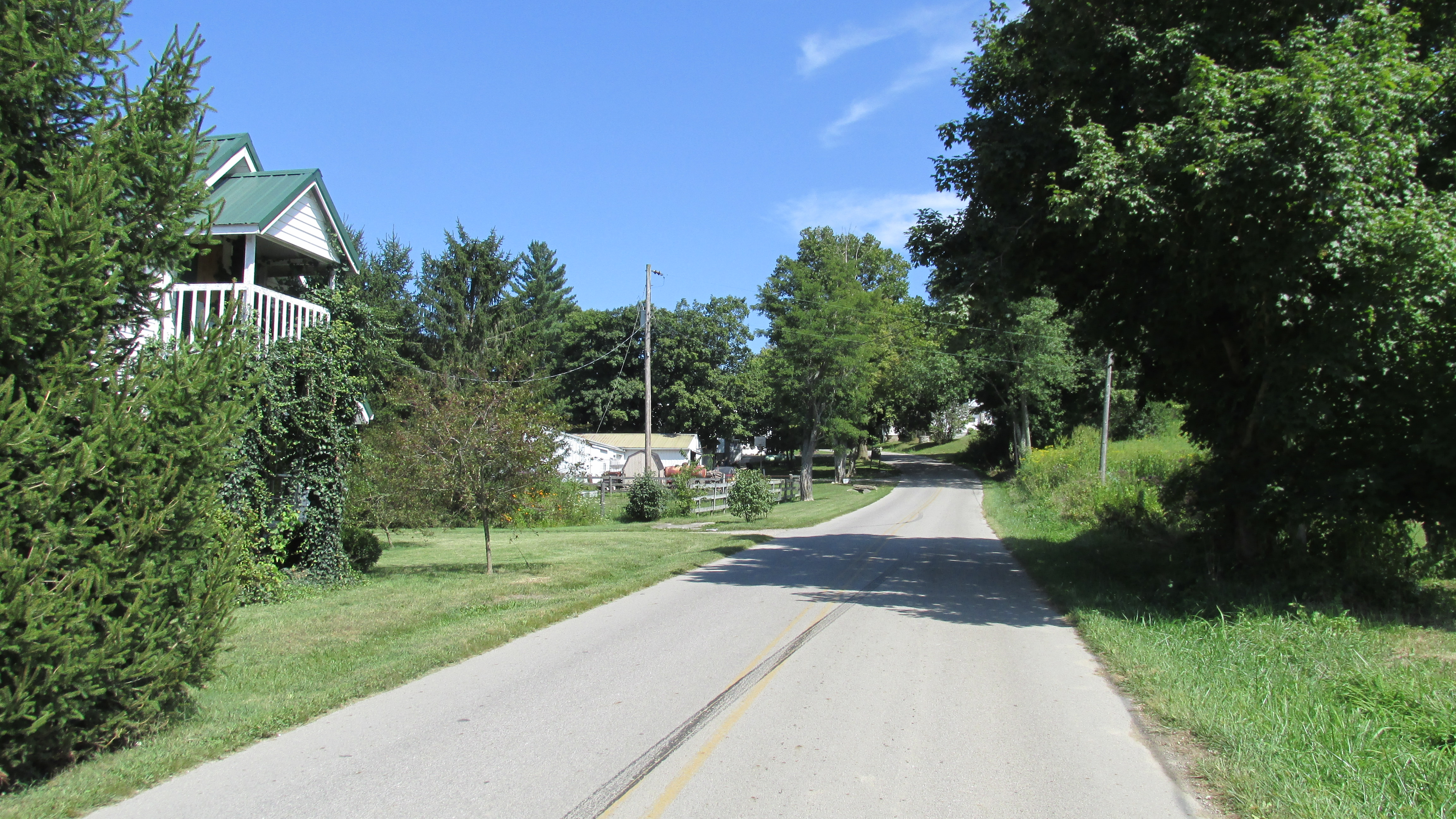
Looking east on Graces Run Road in Harshaville

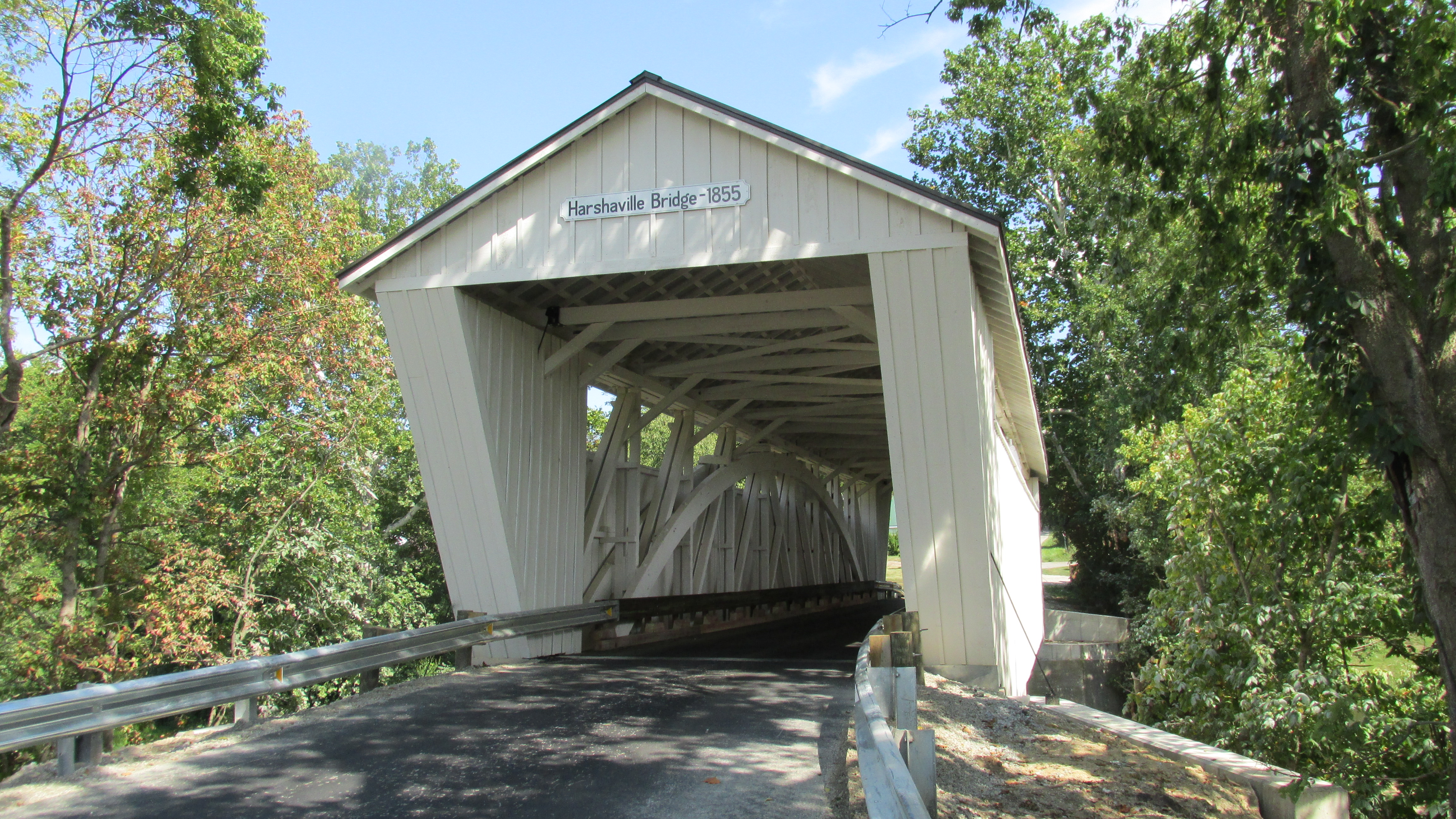
Harshaville Covered Bridge
