= Locust Grove, Adams County, Ohio =

Locust Grove, Ohio
- Unincorporated community
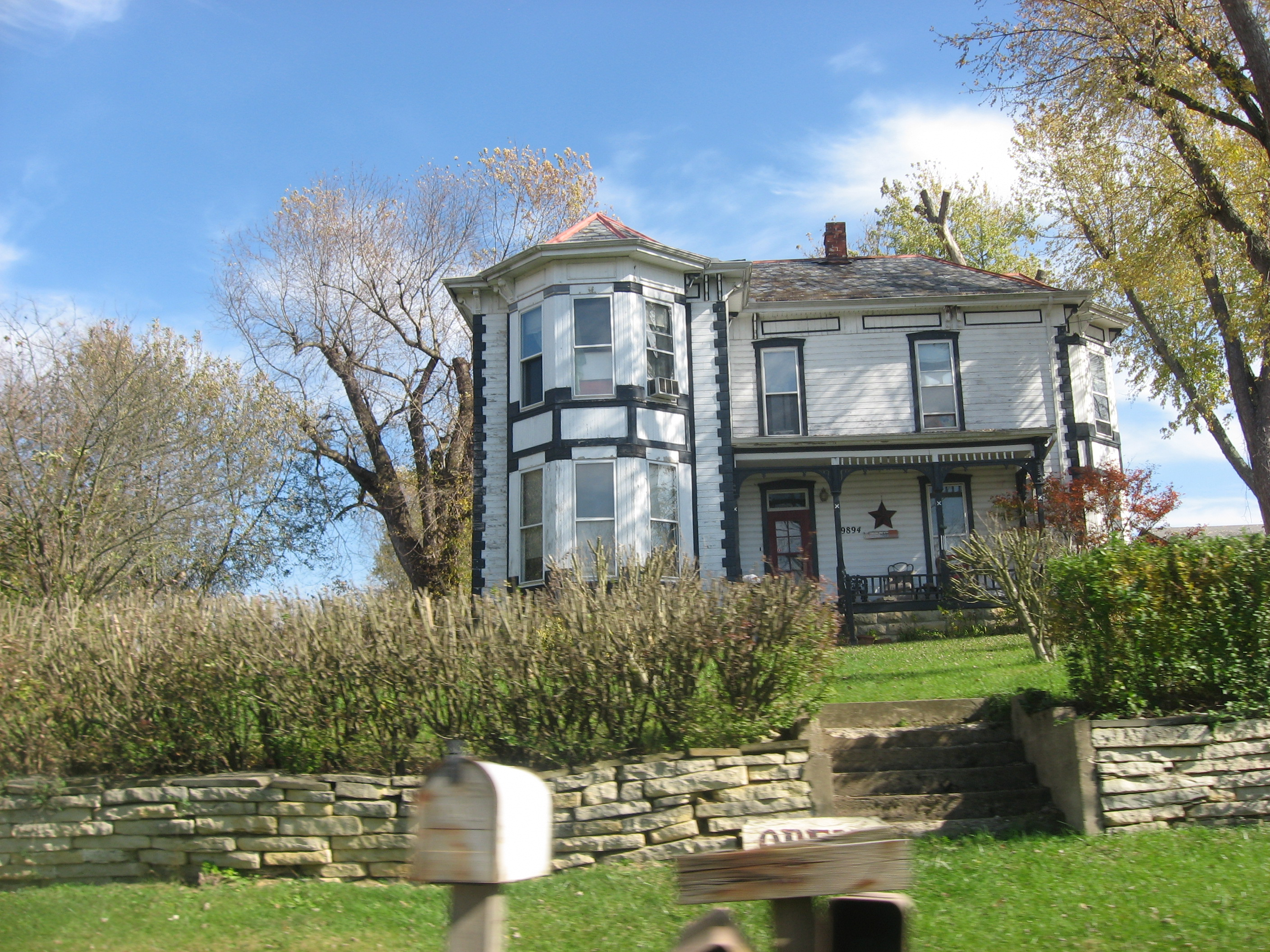
- An Italianate house in the community

- Location within Ohio Location within the United States
- Coordinates: 38°59′18″N 83°22′41″W
- Country: United States
- State: Ohio
- County: Adams
- Elevation: 784 ft (239 m)
- Time zone: UTC-5 (Eastern (EST))
  - Summer (DST): UTC-4 (EDT)
- Area codes: 937 and 326
- GNIS feature ID: 1057814

Locust Grove is an unincorporated community in Adams County, Ohio, United States. Locust Grove is located at the junction of Ohio State Route 41 and Ohio State Route 73 3.1 miles (5.0 km) north-northeast of Peebles.

== History ==
Locust Grove was laid out in 1835. The community was named for a grove of locust trees near the original town site. A post office was established at Locust Grove in 1833, and remained in operation until 1920.
