= Adams County Courthouse (Ohio) =

Local government building in the United States

The Adams County Courthouse
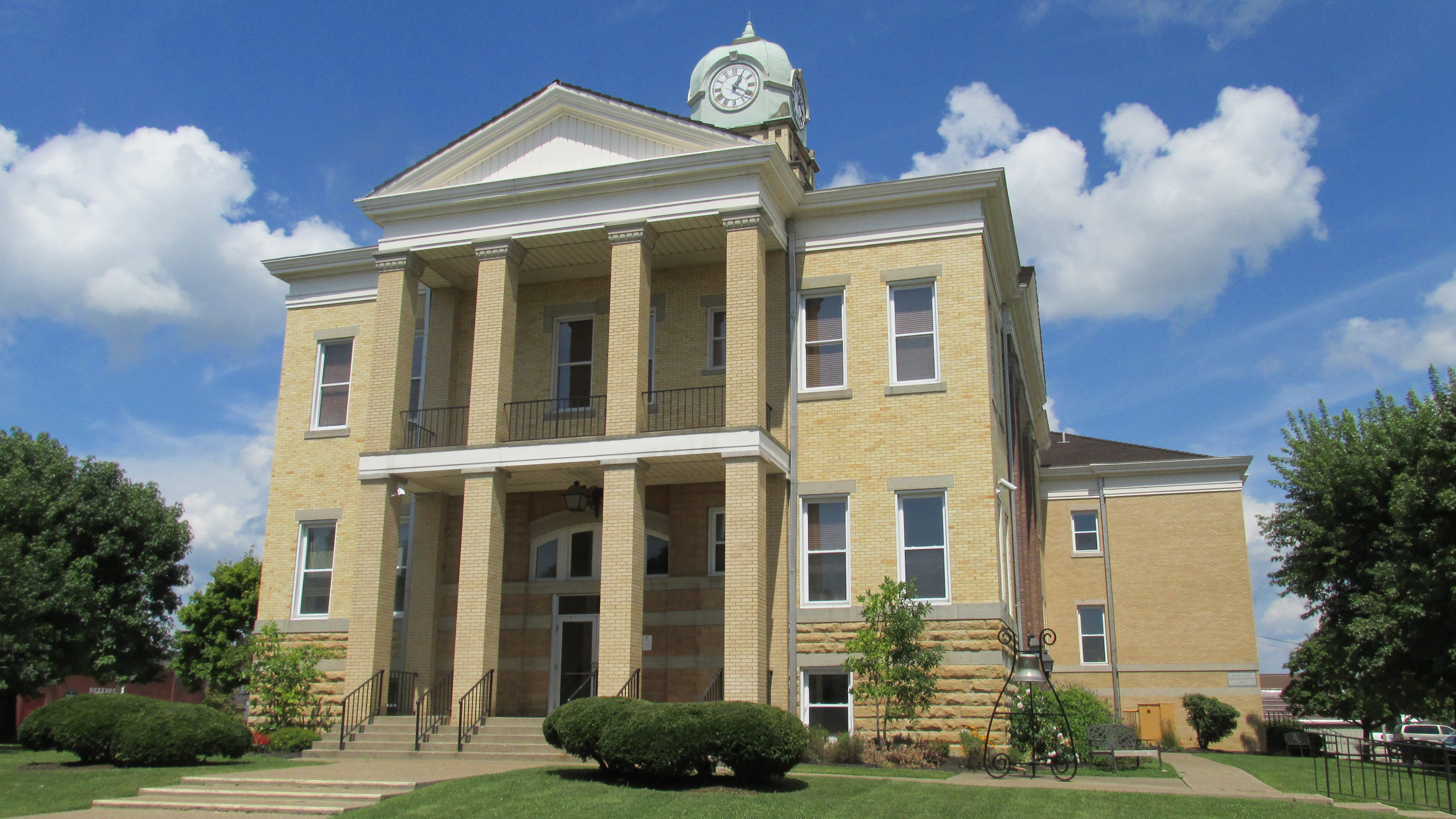
- The Courthouse in West Union, Ohio
- Interactive map of the The Adams County Courthouse area

General information
- Architectural style: Georgian
- Location: West Union, Ohio, United States
- Coordinates: 38°47′38″N 83°32′37″W
- Construction started: 1910
- Completed: 1911
- Cost: $50,000
- Client: Adams County Commissioners

Design and construction
- Architect: T.S. Murray

The Adams County Courthouse is located at 110 West Main Street in West Union, Ohio, United States.

== History ==
Adams County was formed in 1797 as the fourth county of the Northwest Territory which would soon form the state of Ohio. The first county seat was in Manchester but no courthouse was ever built at that location. The first official county seat of the territory was Adamsville and the county officials met in various locations, as, like Manchester, no courthouse was constructed.

The Ohio General Assembly moved the county seat to West Union, the current county seat, and plans for a courthouse were drafted. This first courthouse was a simple log structure of oak, poplar, walnut and blue ash. The courthouse stood two stories high and had a footprint of 30 feet by 24 feet. This structure was replaced in 1811 by a stone and brick building. This building also stood two stories high with a pitched roof resting on an unadorned entablature. A cupola rose from the roof line and could be seen around the town. The building remained until 1876 when a new courthouse was constructed. It was around this time that Manchester unsuccessfully petitioned to be named the county seat.

The present courthouse replaced the courthouse of 1876 after a fire wiped out the structure and all of the court records. Constructed from 1910 to 1911 by architect T.S. Murray, the building was built from a bond passed that raised $50,000.

== Exterior ==
The building was built with yellow bricks with unadorned rectangular windows. The entrances were lined with red brick pilasters supporting a pediment roof. The roof was flat with a balustrade. A rectangular tower rises from the center of the building and is crowned with four arches supporting a dome. The dome is relatively unadorned and houses a four-faced clock.

Renovation in 1975 saw a northern addition containing a courtroom, jail, office space, and the county sheriff's living quarters (which was formally retired in the late 1990s). The front portico was also added and includes four bottom pilasters supporting a balcony, with four pilasters supporting the pediment above.

== Interior ==
The main entrance contains a unique decoration, a mounted head of the white-tailed deer commonly found throughout Ohio. The 27-point buck was found frozen in a creek by local boys Steven & Donnie Swayne and Tommy Dryden, who then carried the head of the deer back to town. The find caused much debate, as the wildlife officer for Adams County claimed the buck was found dead and did not belong to anyone. After much debate and petitions, the head made its way to the courthouse in 1976 and has been proudly displayed in the courthouse ever since.

== Gallery ==
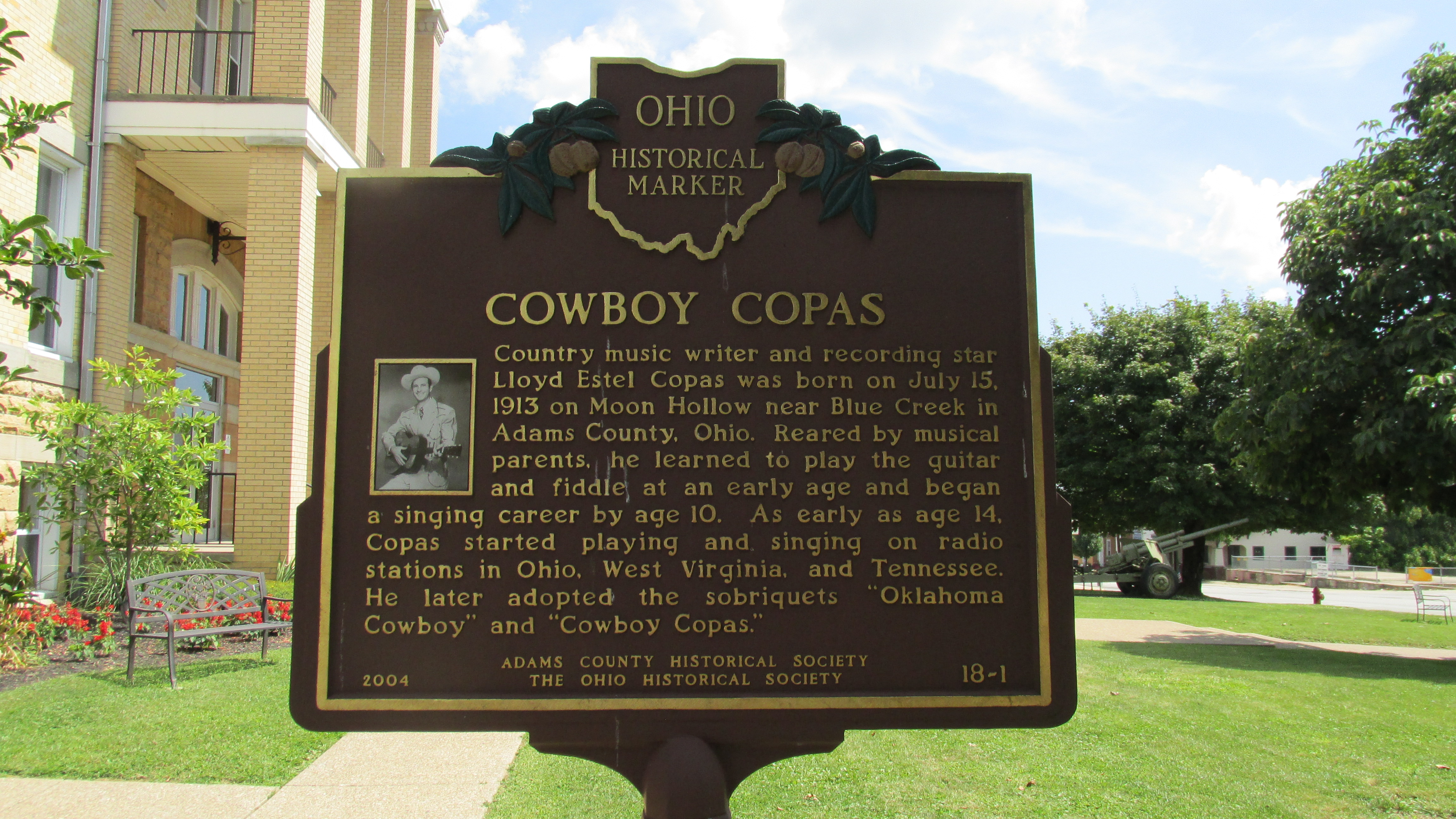
Cowboy Copas Ohio Historical Marker

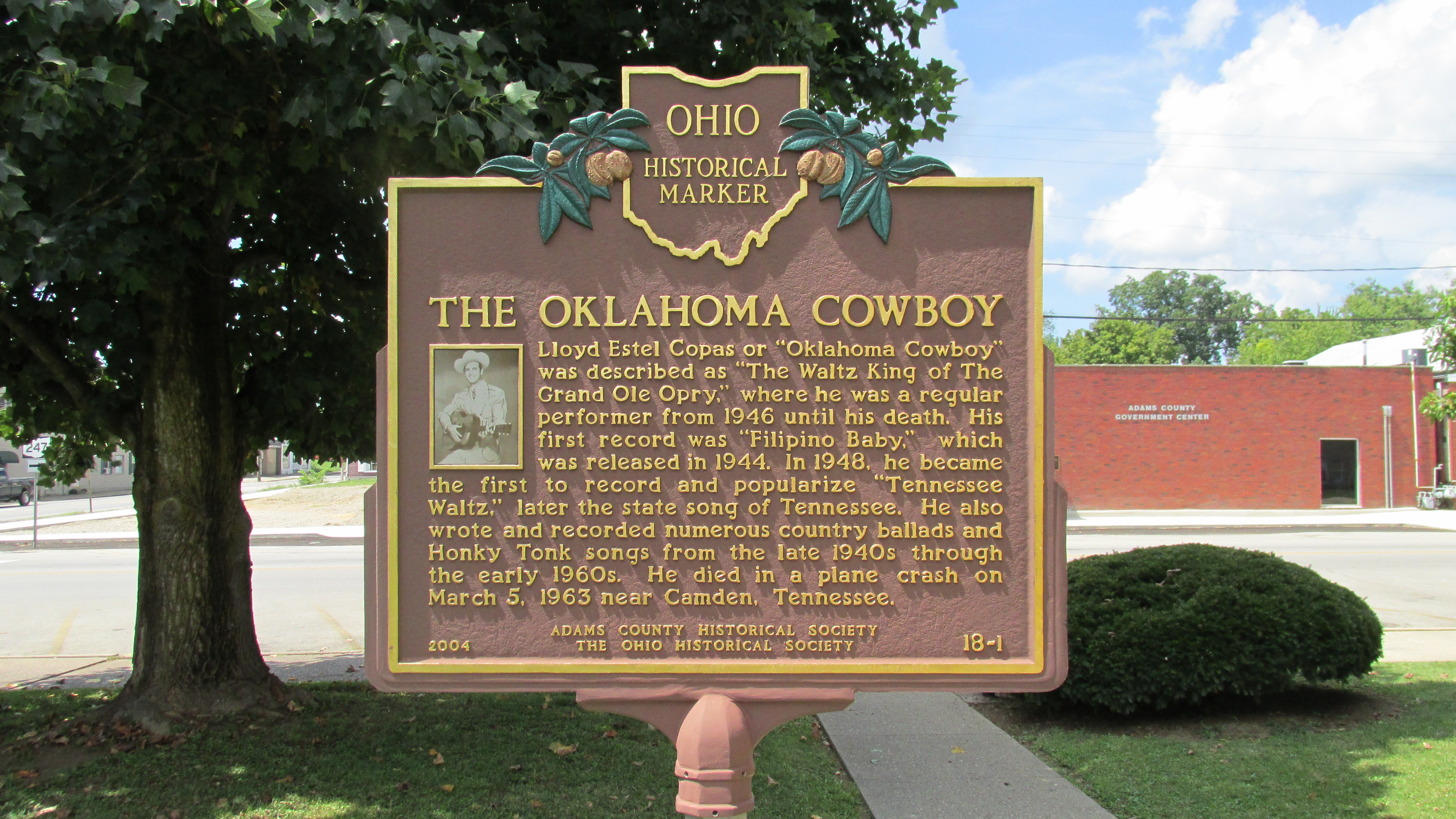
Cowboy Copas Ohio Historical Marker

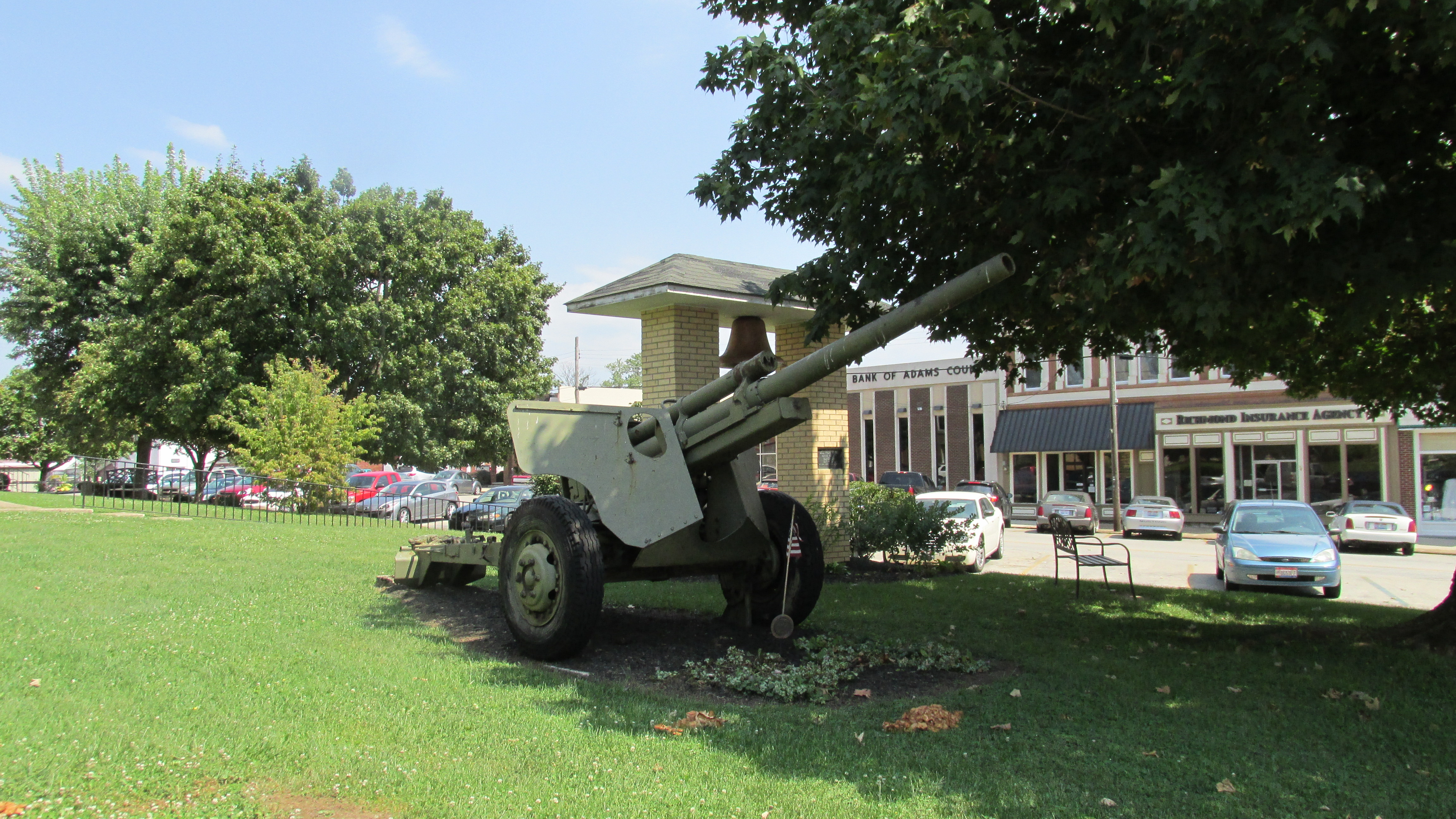
Howitzer on courthouse lawn

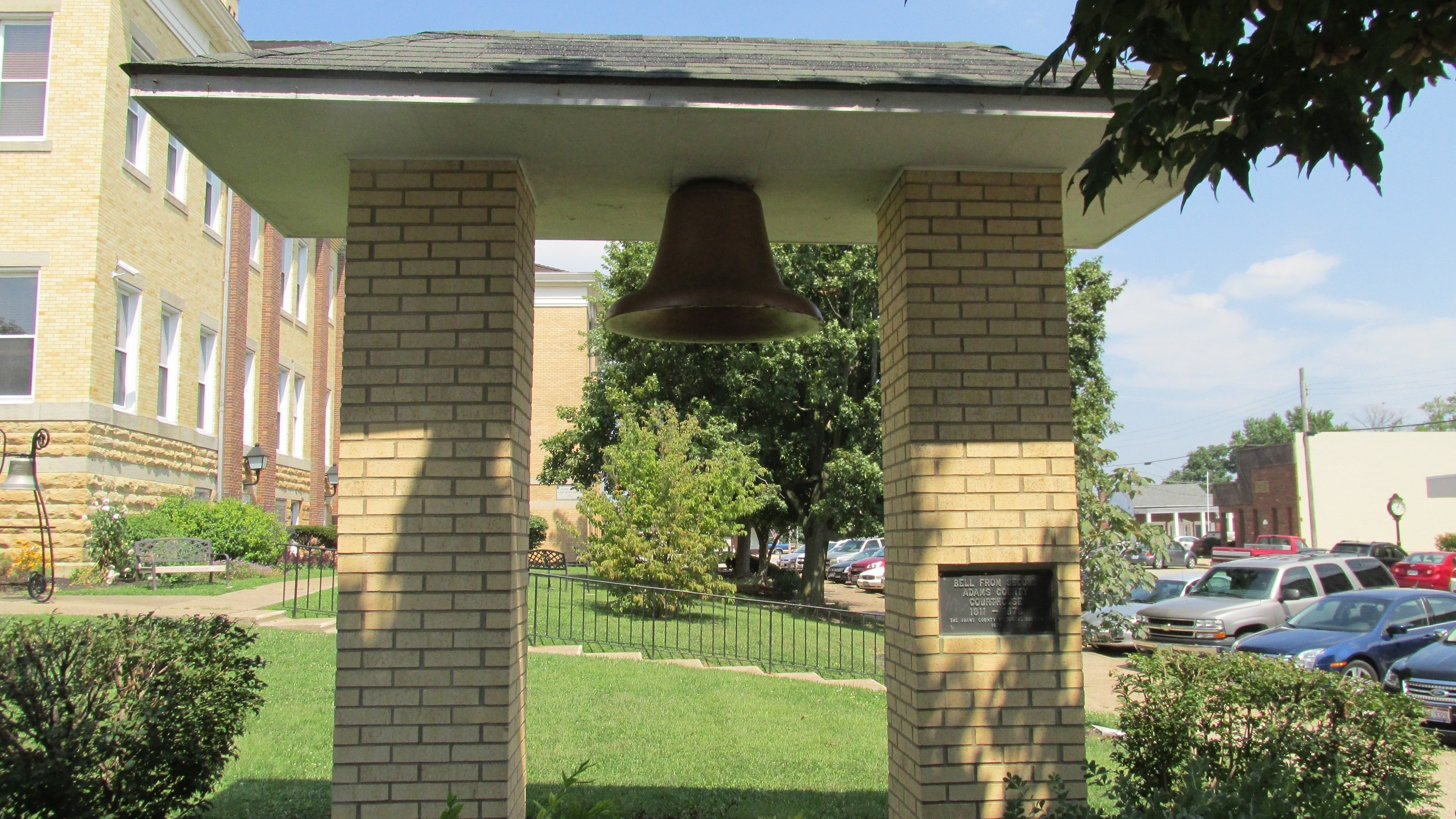
Bell from second Adams County Courthouse 1811 - 1876

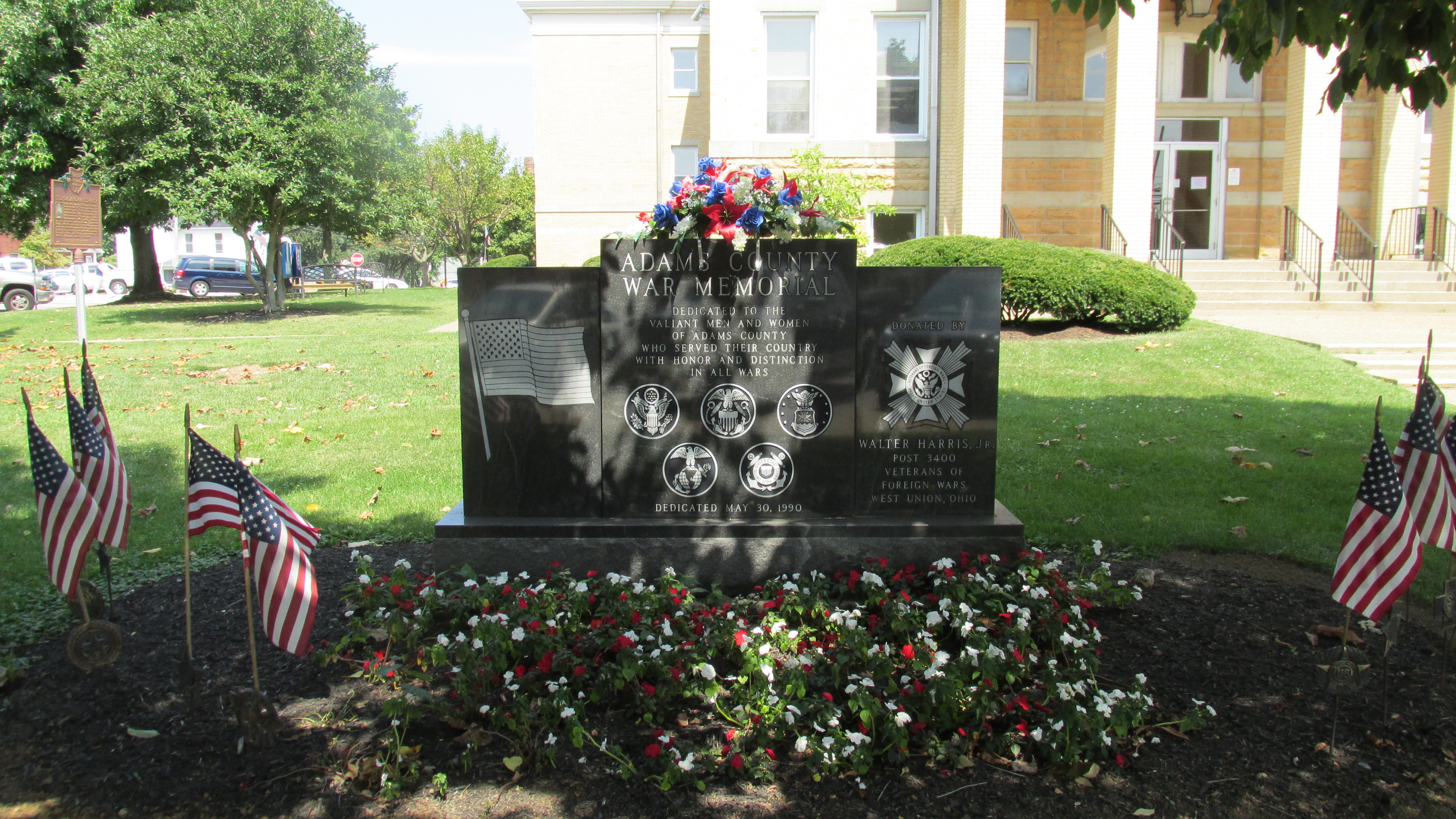
Adams County War Memorial

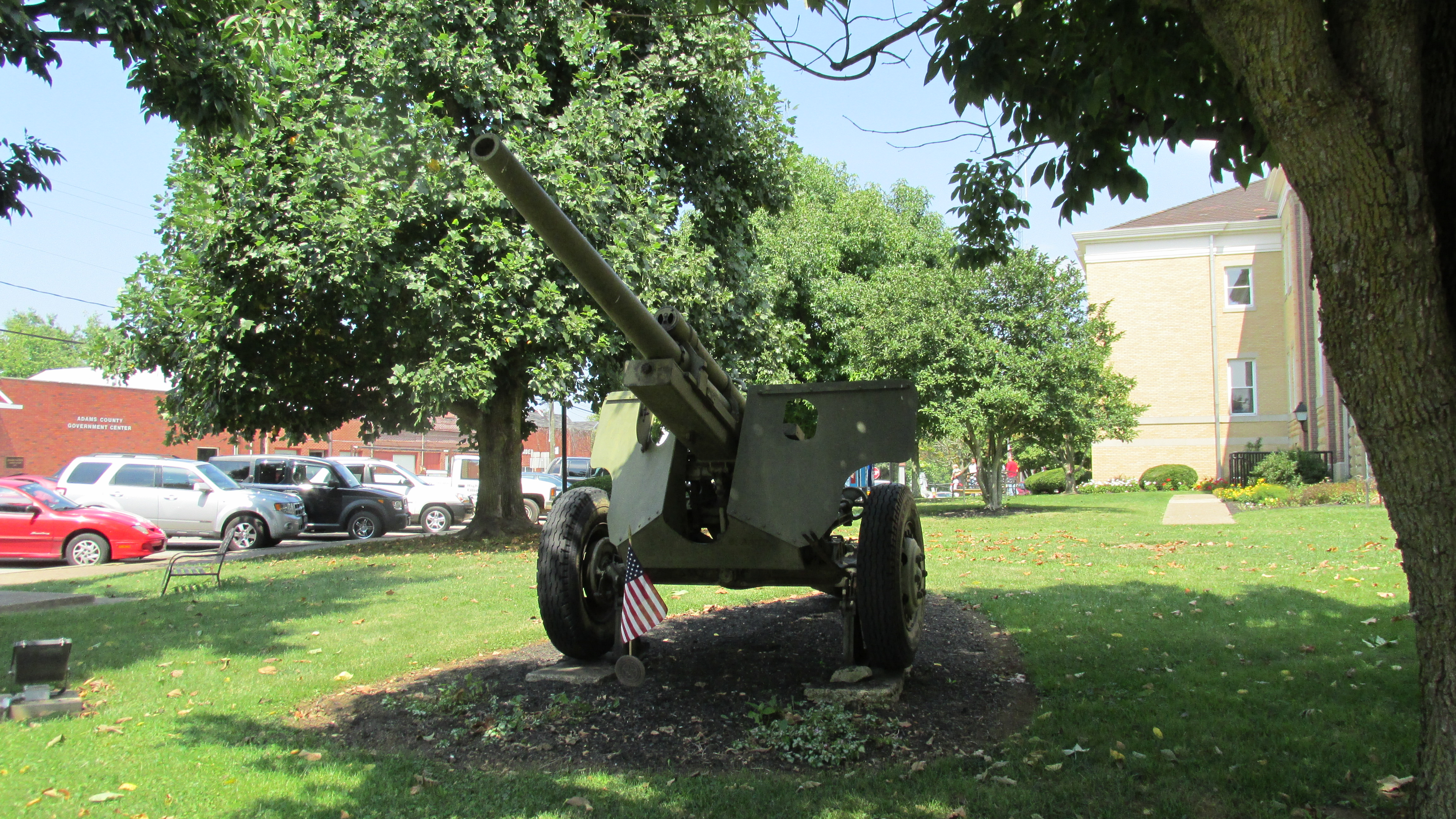
Howitzer on courthouse lawn

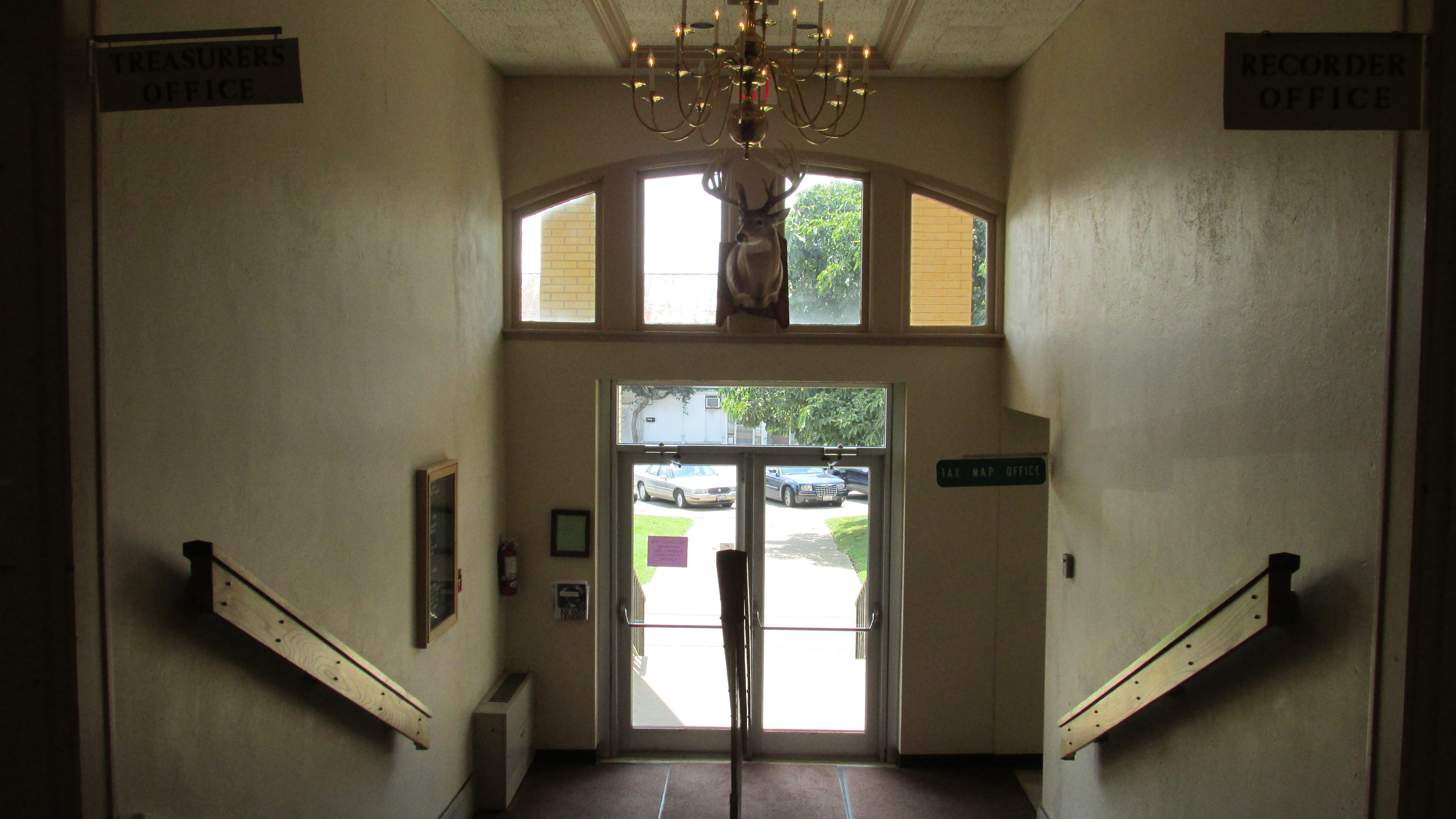
Deer head above main entrance
