= May Hill, Ohio =

Unincorporated community in Ohio, U.S.

Coordinates: 39°00′46″N 83°30′29″W

May Hill is an unincorporated community in Adams County, in the U.S. state of Ohio.

== History ==
May Hill had its start when a country store opened there. A post office called May Hill was established in 1856, and remained in operation until 1905.
