= Wamsley, Ohio =

Unincorporated community in Ohio, U.S.

Coordinates: 38°49′45″N 83°16′37″W

Wamsley is an unincorporated community in Adams County, Ohio, United States.

== History ==
Wamsley was originally called Wamsleyville, and under the latter name was laid out in 1874 by William Wamsley, and named for him. A post office was established at Wamsley in 1869, and remained in operation until 1933.
