= Youngsville, Ohio =

Unincorporated community in Ohio, U.S.

Coordinates: 38°55′22″N 83°34′03″W

Youngsville is an unincorporated community in Adams County, in the U.S. state of Ohio.

== History ==
Youngsville had its start in 1840 when David Young opened a country store there. A post office called Youngsville was established in 1848, and remained in operation until 1905.
