= Bradyville, West Virginia =

Unincorporated community in West Virginia, US

Coordinates: 38°08′47″N 82°11′02″W

Bradyville is an unincorporated community in Lincoln County, in the U.S. state of West Virginia.

== History ==
Bradyville was laid out in 1903 by Joseph Brady, and named for him. A post office called Bradyville was established in 1906, and remained in operation until 1934.
