= Bradysville, Ohio =

Unincorporated community in Ohio, U.S.

Coordinates: 38°41′43″N 83°40′14″W

Bradysville is an unincorporated community in Adams County, in the U.S. state of Ohio.

== History ==
Bradysville was originally called Bradyville, and under the latter name was laid out in 1839 by Van S. Brady, and named for him. A post office called Bradyville was established in 1846, and remained in operation until 1904.
