= Margaret Hill =

Margaret Hill may refer to:

== People ==
- Margaret Hill (social reformer) (1885–1970), a British social reformer
- Margaret Hill (dancer) (1929–1975), British ballerina
- Margaret Hunt Hill (1915–2007), American heiress and philanthropist
- Margaret Hill McCarter (1860–1938), American teacher and novelist
- Margaret Hill Morris (1737–1816), Colonial American Quaker medical practitioner and diarist

== Places ==
- Margaret Hill (Antarctica), a peak on Rucker Ridge, Victoria Land, Antarctica

== See also ==
- Margaret Hills (1882–1967), British teacher and feminist
