= Adams County, Ohio =

County in Ohio, United States

- County
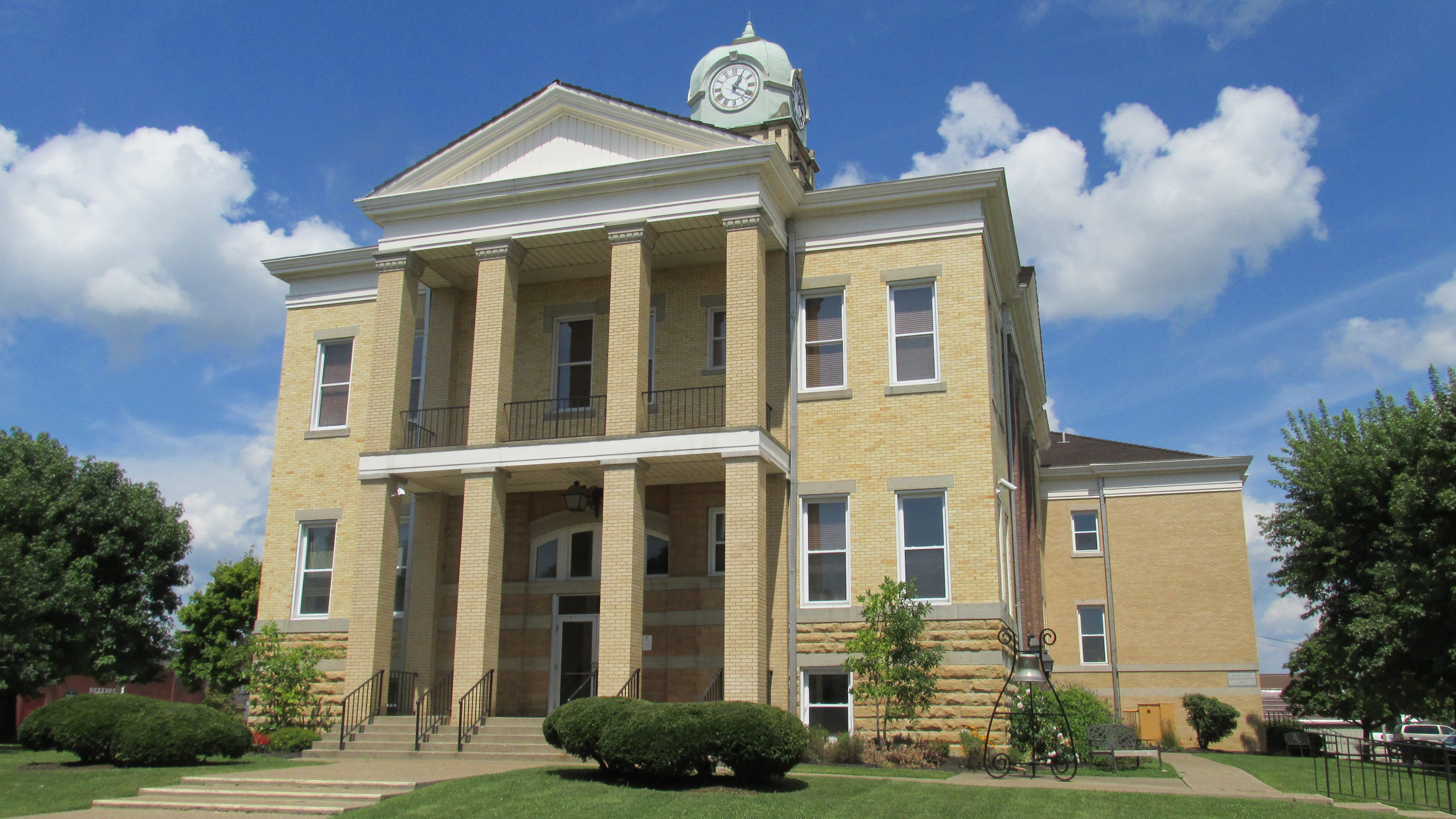
- Adams County Courthouse

- Flag Seal

- Location within the U.S. state of Ohio
- Coordinates: 38°50′N 83°29′W
- Country: United States
- State: Ohio
- Founded: July 10, 1797
- Named for: John Adams
- Seat: West Union
- Largest village: West Union

Area
  - Total: 586 sq mi (1,520 km^{2})
  - Land: 584 sq mi (1,510 km^{2})
  - Water: 2.4 sq mi (6.2 km^{2}) 0.4%

Population (2020)
  - Total: 27,477
  - Estimate (2025): 27,865 ▲
  - Density: 47/sq mi (18/km^{2})
- Time zone: UTC−5 (Eastern)
  - Summer (DST): UTC−4 (EDT)
- Congressional district: 2nd
- Website: adamscountyoh.gov

Adams County is a county in the U.S. state of Ohio. As of the 2020 census, the population was 27,477. Its county seat and largest village is West Union. The county is named after John Adams, the second President of the United States.

== Geography ==
According to the U.S. Census Bureau, the county has an area of 586 square miles (1,520 km^{2}), of which 584 square miles (1,510 km^{2}) is land and 2.4 square miles (6.2 km^{2}) (0.4%) is water. It includes many parks and preserves, including one of Ohio's greatest archeological wonders, the Serpent Mound at the Serpent Mound State Memorial in Locust Grove. Serpent Mound lends its name to the Serpent Mound crater, the eroded remnant of a huge ancient meteorite impact crater. Other areas of note include parks and natural areas like The Edge of Appalachia Preserve, Shawnee State Park, Adams Lake State Park, and Robert H. Whipple State Nature Preserve.

=== Adjacent counties ===
- Highland County (north)
- Pike County (northeast)
- Scioto County (east)
- Lewis County, Kentucky (south)
- Mason County, Kentucky (southwest)
- Brown County (west)

=== State protected areas ===
- Adams Lake State Park
- Chaparral Prairie State Nature Preserve
- Davis Memorial State Nature Preserve
- Johnson Ridge State Nature Preserve
- Lynx Prairie
- Shoemaker State Nature Preserve
- Whipple State Nature Preserve

== Demographics ==
Historical population
Census	Pop.	Note	%±
1800	3,432		—
1810	9,434		174.9%
1820	10,406		10.3%
1830	12,281		18.0%
1840	13,183		7.3%
1850	18,883		43.2%
1860	20,309		7.6%
1870	20,750		2.2%
1880	24,005		15.7%
1890	26,093		8.7%
1900	26,328		0.9%
1910	24,755		−6.0%
1920	22,403		−9.5%
1930	20,381		−9.0%
1940	21,705		6.5%
1950	20,499		−5.6%
1960	19,982		−2.5%
1970	18,957		−5.1%
1980	24,328		28.3%
1990	25,371		4.3%
2000	27,330		7.7%
2010	28,550		4.5%
2020	27,477		−3.8%
2025 (est.)	27,865	▲	1.4%
U.S. Decennial Census; 1790–1960 1900–1990; 1990–2000 2020

=== 2020 census ===
As of the 2020 census, 27,477 people lived in 10,938 households, including 7,483 families.

The median age was 42.2 years. 24.0% of residents were under the age of 18 and 18.9% of residents were 65 years of age or older. For every 100 females there were 98.5 males, and for every 100 females age 18 and over there were 96.4 males age 18 and over.

The racial makeup of the county was 95.6% White, 0.3% Black or African American, 0.3% American Indian and Alaska Native, 0.1% Asian, <0.1% Native Hawaiian and Pacific Islander, 0.3% from some other race, and 3.3% from two or more races. Hispanic or Latino residents of any race comprised 0.8% of the population.

<0.1% of residents lived in urban areas, while 100.0% lived in rural areas.

There were 10,938 households in the county, of which 30.8% had children under the age of 18 living in them. Of all households, 47.8% were married-couple households, 19.2% were households with a male householder and no spouse or partner present, and 25.2% were households with a female householder and no spouse or partner present. About 28.0% of all households were made up of individuals and 13.5% had someone living alone who was 65 years of age or older.

There were 12,692 housing units, of which 13.8% were vacant. Among occupied housing units, 70.3% were owner-occupied and 29.7% were renter-occupied. The homeowner vacancy rate was 1.9% and the rental vacancy rate was 6.8%.

=== Racial and ethnic composition ===
Adams County, Ohio – Racial and ethnic composition Note: the US Census treats Hispanic/Latino as an ethnic category. This table excludes Latinos from the racial categories and assigns them to a separate category. Hispanics/Latinos may be of any race.
Race / ethnicity (NH = Non-Hispanic)	Pop 1980	Pop 1990	Pop 2000	Pop 2010	Pop 2020	% 1980	% 1990	% 2000	% 2010	% 2020
White alone (NH)	24,044	25,138	26,604	27,713	26,185	98.83%	99.08%	97.34%	97.07%	95.30%
Black or African American alone (NH)	36	47	47	84	84	0.15%	0.19%	0.17%	0.29%	0.31%
Native American or Alaska Native alone (NH)	26	67	171	105	74	0.11%	0.26%	0.63%	0.37%	0.27%
Asian alone (NH)	25	28	34	31	39	0.10%	0.11%	0.12%	0.11%	0.14%
Native Hawaiian or Pacific Islander alone (NH)	x	x	9	2	1	x	x	0.03%	0.01%	0.00%
Other race alone (NH)	2	1	11	11	33	0.01%	0.00%	0.04%	0.04%	0.12%
Mixed race or Multiracial (NH)	x	x	279	361	844	x	x	1.02%	1.26%	3.07%
Hispanic or Latino (any race)	195	90	175	243	217	0.80%	0.35%	0.64%	0.85%	0.79%
Total	24,328	25,371	27,330	28,550	27,477	100.00%	100.00%	100.00%	100.00%	100.00%

=== 2010 census ===
As of the 2010 United States census, 28,550 people, 11,147 households, and 7,793 families resided in the county. The population density was 48.9 inhabitants per square mile (18.9/km^{2}). There were 12,978 housing units at an average density of 22.2 per square mile (8.6/km^{2}). The racial makeup of the county was 97.7% white, 0.4% American Indian, 0.3% black or African American, 0.1% Asian, 0.2% from other races, and 1.3% from two or more races. Those of Hispanic or Latino origin made up 0.9% of the population. In terms of ancestry, 17.6% were German, 16.5% were American, 15.3% were Irish, and 9.8% were English.

Of the 11,147 households, 33.5% had children under the age of 18 living with them, 52.2% were married couples living together, 12.1% had a female householder with no husband present, 30.1% were non-families, and 25.9% of all households were made up of individuals. The average household size was 2.53 and the average family size was 3.01. The median age was 39.6 years.

The median income for a household in the county was $32,791 and the median income for a family was $40,305. Males had a median income of $37,277 versus $25,746 for females. The per capita income for the county was $17,693. About 18.8% of families and 23.0% of the population were below the poverty line, including 30.0% of those under age 18 and 16.8% of those age 65 or over.

=== 2000 census ===
As of the 2000 United States census, 27,330 people, 10,501 households, and 7,613 families resided in the county. The population density was 47 people per square mile (18 people/km^{2}). There were 11,822 housing units at an average density of 20 per square mile (7.7/km^{2}). The racial makeup of the county was 97.77% White, 0.18% Black or African American, 0.68% Native American, 0.12% Asian, 0.03% Pacific Islander, 0.11% from other races, and 1.10% from two or more races. 0.64% of the population were Hispanic or Latino of any race. 38.5% were of American, 19.8% German, 11.7% Irish and 8.9% English ancestry according to Census 2000.

There were 10,501 households, out of which 34.00% had children under the age of 18 living with them, 57.10% were married couples living together, 10.40% had a female householder with no husband present, and 27.50% were non-families. 24.00% of all households were made up of individuals, and 11.00% had someone living alone who was 65 years of age or older. The average household size was 2.57 and the average family size was 3.03.

In the county, the population was spread out, with 26.40% under the age of 18, 8.70% from 18 to 24, 28.20% from 25 to 44, 23.40% from 45 to 64, and 13.30% who were 65 years of age or older. The median age was 36 years. For every 100 females there were 96.10 males. For every 100 females age 18 and over, there were 94.80 males.

The median income for a household in the county was $29,315, and the median income for a family was $34,714. Males had a median income of $30,000 versus $20,433 for females. The per capita income for the county was $14,515. About 12.80% of families and 17.40% of the population were below the poverty line, including 20.30% of those under age 18 and 16.00% of those age 65 or over.

== Economy ==
The economy of Adams County employs 10,100 people. Its largest industries are manufacturing (1,774 people), retail trade (1,618 people), and health care and social assistance (1,599 people), and the highest paying industries are utilities ($69,063), and finance and insurance ($56,938). A 2019 report identified Adams County as the poorest in Ohio with a 23.8% poverty rate and median household income of $36,320 ($16,000 less than the state average). The county also has the state's highest unemployment rate at 6.8%. Poor economic conditions led to a 2.1% decrease in the county's population during the previous five years.

== Politics ==
Prior to 1936, Adams County was a swing county in presidential elections, holding bellwether status from 1896 to 1932. From 1936 on, the county has become strongly Republican and failed to back Republican candidates only in 1964 and 1976 since then, which also enabled it to regain bellwether status from 1964 to 1988.

United States presidential election results for Adams County, Ohio
Year	Republican		Democratic		Third party(ies)	
Year	No.	%	No.	%	No.	%
1856	1,407	40.49%	1,790	51.51%	278	8.00%
1860	1,667	43.33%	2,010	52.25%	170	4.42%
1864	2,094	51.99%	1,934	48.01%	0	0.00%
1868	2,044	47.63%	2,247	52.37%	0	0.00%
1872	1,877	48.63%	1,972	51.09%	11	0.28%
1876	2,141	45.47%	2,546	54.07%	22	0.47%
1880	2,563	48.39%	2,725	51.44%	9	0.17%
1884	2,833	49.05%	2,886	49.97%	57	0.99%
1888	2,870	47.71%	3,022	50.24%	123	2.04%
1892	2,903	48.44%	2,832	47.26%	258	4.31%
1896	3,338	50.13%	3,248	48.78%	73	1.10%
1900	3,535	51.81%	3,169	46.45%	119	1.74%
1904	3,252	51.98%	2,796	44.69%	208	3.32%
1908	3,432	52.11%	3,048	46.28%	106	1.61%
1912	1,863	38.03%	2,279	46.52%	757	15.45%
1916	2,819	48.21%	2,887	49.38%	141	2.41%
1920	4,974	54.07%	4,194	45.59%	31	0.34%
1924	4,315	52.46%	3,762	45.73%	149	1.81%
1928	5,665	65.23%	3,000	34.54%	20	0.23%
1932	4,857	44.43%	5,909	54.06%	165	1.51%
1936	5,910	50.21%	5,832	49.55%	28	0.24%
1940	6,180	55.24%	5,007	44.76%	0	0.00%
1944	5,590	58.30%	3,998	41.70%	0	0.00%
1948	5,103	54.24%	4,293	45.63%	12	0.13%
1952	5,648	58.93%	3,937	41.07%	0	0.00%
1956	5,637	59.14%	3,894	40.86%	0	0.00%
1960	5,996	60.59%	3,900	39.41%	0	0.00%
1964	3,702	42.52%	5,005	57.48%	0	0.00%
1968	3,973	51.54%	2,685	34.83%	1,050	13.62%
1972	4,980	63.18%	2,709	34.37%	193	2.45%
1976	4,197	47.80%	4,450	50.68%	133	1.51%
1980	5,336	53.75%	4,161	41.91%	431	4.34%
1984	6,113	62.83%	3,534	36.32%	82	0.84%
1988	5,916	60.71%	3,740	38.38%	88	0.90%
1992	4,722	43.89%	3,998	37.16%	2,038	18.94%
1996	4,763	45.88%	4,317	41.59%	1,301	12.53%
2000	6,380	62.34%	3,581	34.99%	274	2.68%
2004	7,653	63.78%	4,281	35.67%	66	0.55%
2008	6,914	60.57%	4,170	36.53%	330	2.89%
2012	6,865	61.75%	3,976	35.76%	277	2.49%
2016	8,659	75.88%	2,326	20.38%	427	3.74%
2020	9,870	81.27%	2,156	17.75%	119	0.98%
2024	10,269	82.62%	2,098	16.88%	62	0.50%

United States Senate election results for Adams County, Ohio1
Year	Republican		Democratic		Third party(ies)	
Year	No.	%	No.	%	No.	%
2024	9,325	76.60%	2,447	20.10%	401	3.29%

== Government ==
Adams County has a three-member Board of County Commissioners who manage the various County departments. Adams County's elected commissioners are: Kelly Jones, Jason Hayslip, and Barbara Moore.

== Library ==
The Adams County Public Library serves the communities of Adams County, Ohio from its administrative location in Peebles and branches in Manchester, West Union, and Seaman.

In 2005, the library system loaned more than 264,000 items to its 14,000 cardholders. Total holdings (as of 2005) were over 101,000 volumes with over 250 periodical subscriptions.

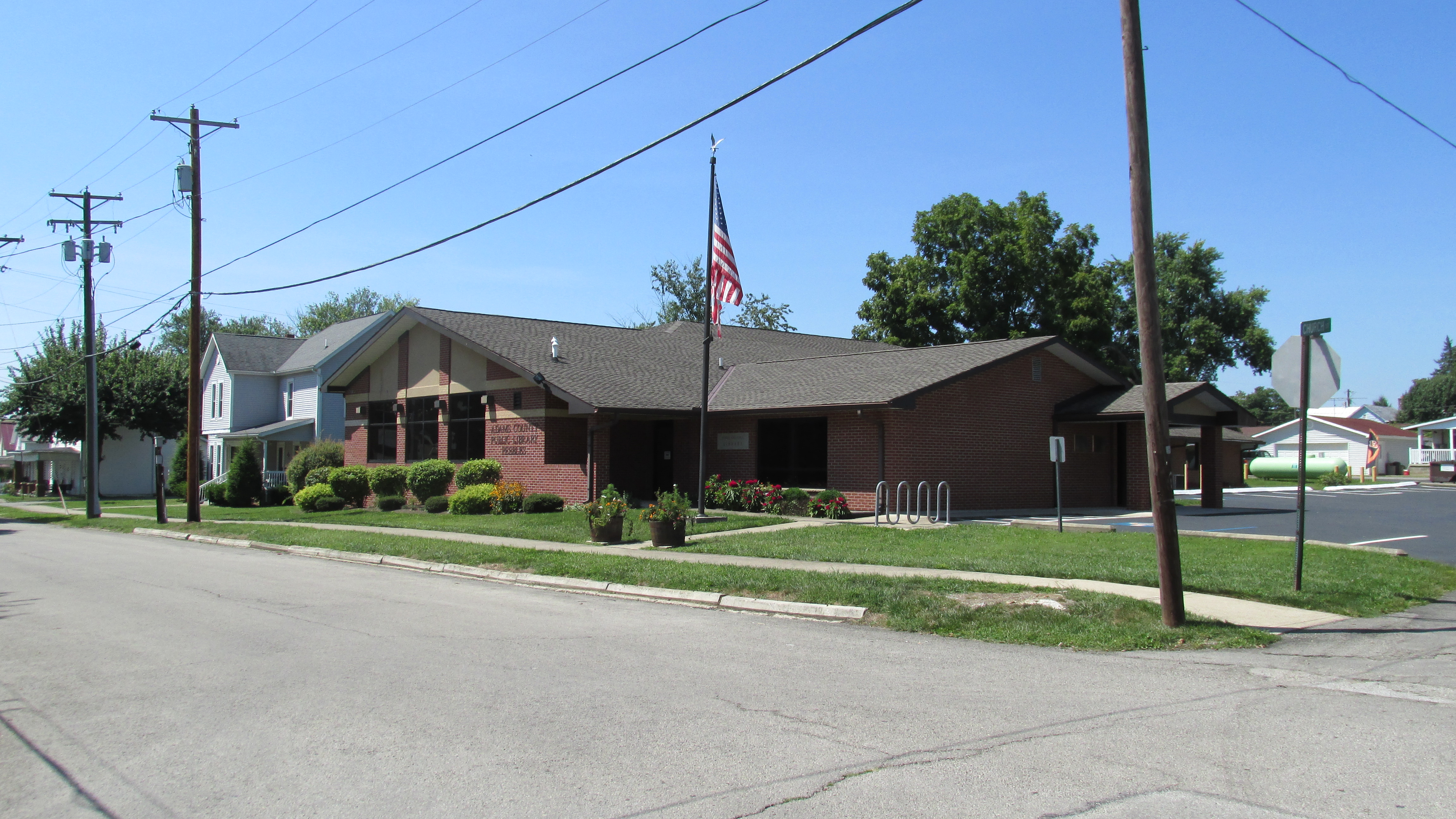
Peebles Library

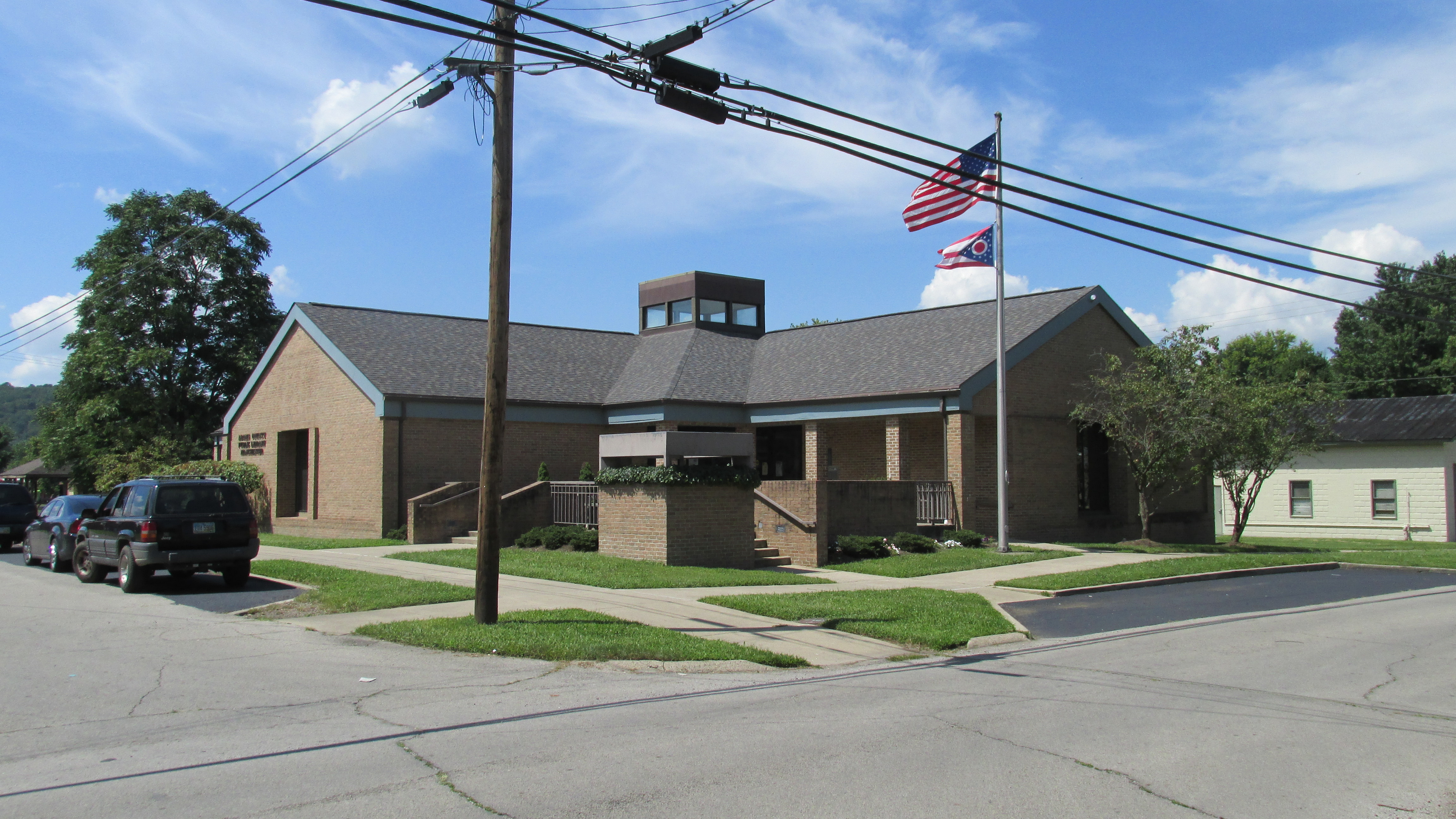
Manchester Library

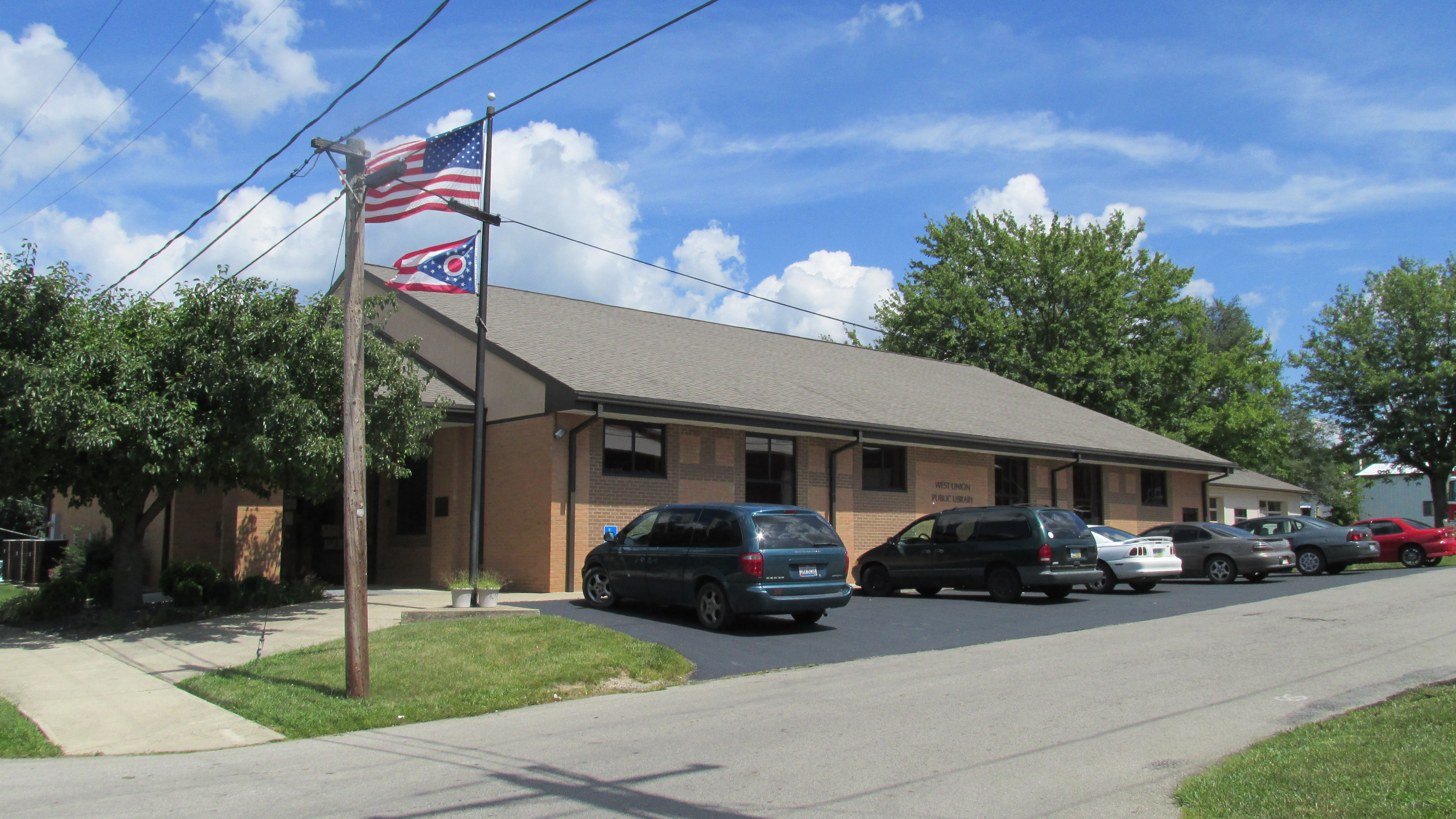
West Union Library

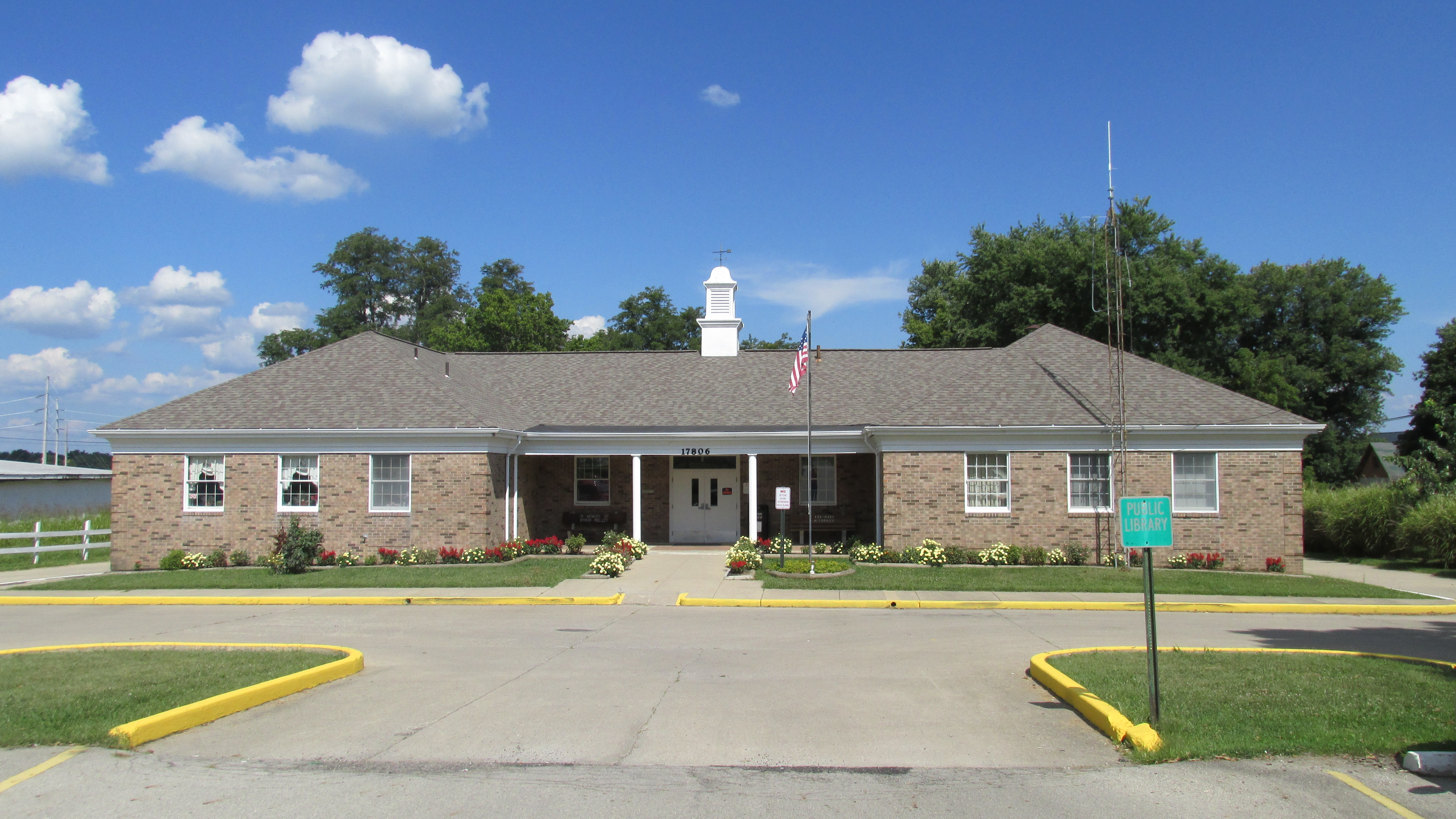
Seaman Library

== Hospital ==
Adams County is served by the Adams County Regional Medical Center near Seaman. The hospital was previously known as Adams County Hospital, and was in West Union. It was renamed and relocated to Seaman, and is easily accessible from the Appalachian Highway.

== Communities ==
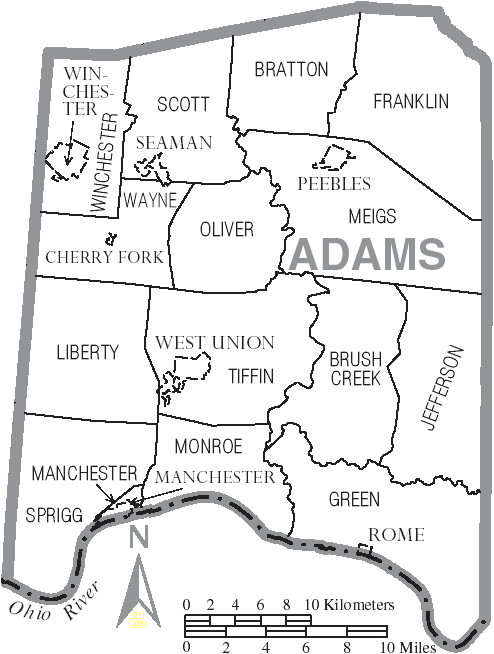
Map of Adams County, Ohio With Municipal and Township Labels

=== Villages ===
- Manchester
- Peebles
- Rome
- Seaman
- West Union (county seat)
- Winchester

=== Townships ===
- Bratton
- Brush Creek
- Franklin
- Green
- Jefferson
- Liberty
- Manchester
- Meigs
- Monroe
- Oliver
- Scott
- Sprigg
- Tiffin
- Wayne
- Winchester

=== Census-designated places ===
- Bentonville
- Cherry Fork

=== Other unincorporated communities ===
- Bacon Flat
- Beasley Fork
- Beaver Pond
- Blue Creek
- Bradysville
- Catbird
- Cedar Mills
- Clayton
- Dunkinsville
- Eckmansville
- Emerald
- Fairview
- Fawcett
- Grooms
- Harshaville
- Jacksonville
- Jaybird
- Jessup
- Jones Corner
- Lawshe
- Locust Grove
- Louden
- Louisville
- Lynx
- Marble Furnace
- May Hill
- Mineral Springs
- Panhandle
- Pine Gap
- Rockville
- Sandy Springs
- Scrub Ridge
- Smoky Corners
- Squirreltown
- Selig
- Steam Furnace
- Sunshine
- Tranquility
- Tulip
- Unity
- Wamsley
- Wheat Ridge
- Whippoorwill
- Wrightsville
- Youngsville

== Places of interest ==
- Great Serpent Mound
- Counterfeit House in the Manchester, OH area, the only home constructed for the purposes of counterfeiting U.S. currency
- Brushcreek Motorsports Complex
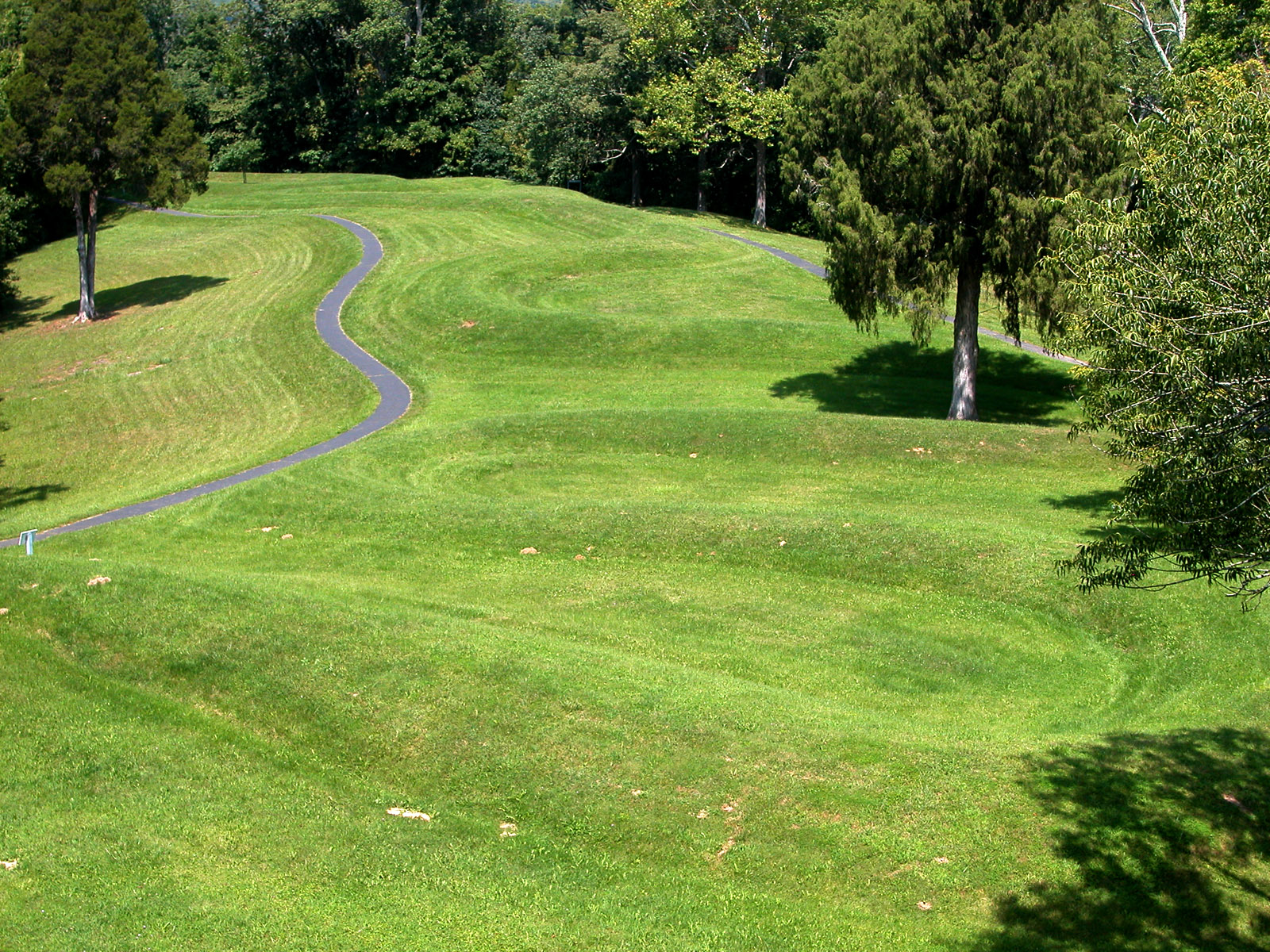
Serpent Mound

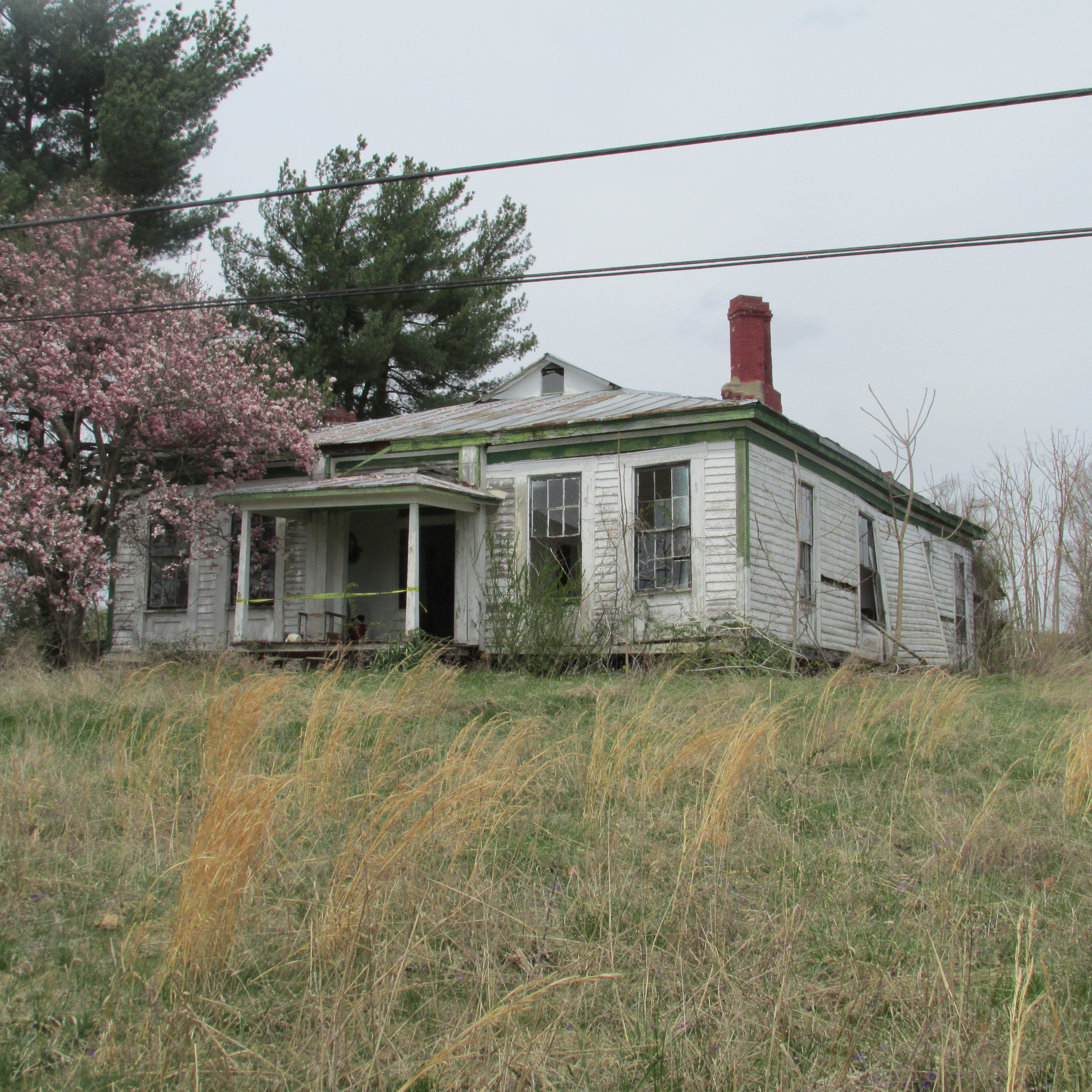
Counterfeit House

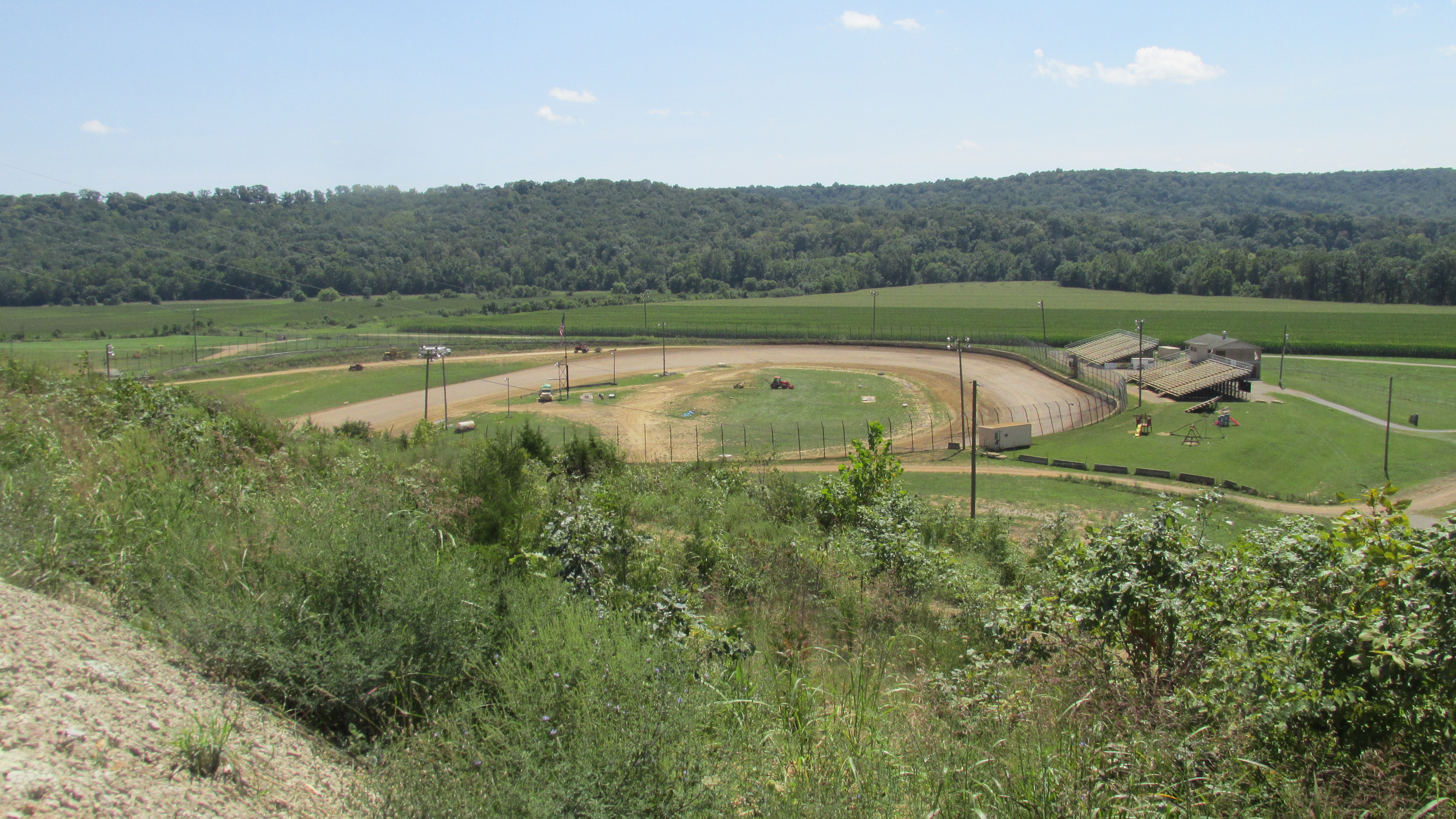
Brushcreek Motorsports Complex

== Notable people ==
- Moses N. Adams, missionary to the Dakota people
- Afroman, rapper
- Cowboy Copas, country music singer
- Joseph Darlinton, brigadier general during the War of 1812, represented Adams County in the Ohio Senate.
- John Glasgow Kerr, noted physician and medical missionary; founder of the first hospital for the insane in China
- Thomas Kirker, 2nd Governor of Ohio
- John P. Leedom, United States congressman from Ohio and Sergeant at Arms of the United States House of Representatives
- Philip Lewis Sr., an early pioneer of Adams County and a prominent politician
- Daniel McCann, sold the eagle Old Abe to the 8th Wisconsin Volunteer Infantry Regiment
- William H. Reddick, received the Medal of Honor for service in the 33rd Ohio Infantry
- Jack Roush, founder, CEO, and co-owner of Roush Fenway Racing
- Doug White, former president of the Ohio Senate

== See also ==
- National Register of Historic Places listings in Adams County, Ohio
- List of counties in Ohio
