= Prairie dock =

Prairie dock is a common name for several plants:

- Silphium perfoliatum
- Silphium terebinthinaceum
- Parthenium integrifolium
