= Robert Lusk =

Irish Presbyterian minister (1781–1845)

Robert Adam Holliday Lusk
- Born: March 8, 1781 near Derry, Ireland
- Died: December 14, 1845 (aged 64); Walnut Ridge, near Salem, Indiana
- Education: Jefferson College, 1810; Philadelphia Theological Seminary, 1814
- Known for: His controversial career in the Reformed Presbyterian Church; co-presbyter in the erection of the Reformed Presbytery, with David Steele, in 1840
- Scientific career
- Fields: Theology

Robert Adam Holliday Lusk (March 8, 1781 – December 14, 1845) was a Reformed Presbyterian or Covenanter minister of the strictest sort, in a century which, according to Presbyterian historian Robert E. Thompson, was marked by increasing relaxation into less stringent manifestations of doctrine and practice amongst all branches of Presbyterianism. His career crossed paths with many prominent ministers and he was involved in numerous ecclesiastical courts at pivotal moments in the history of the Reformed Presbyterian Church. Amongst Reformed Presbyterians, he was an "Old Light," and amongst "Old Lights," he would lay claim to be an "Original Covenanter." He was descended from a long line of Scotch-Irish, and the Lusks had fled from Scotland to Ireland, escaping religious persecution; many of them settled in America prior to the American Revolutionary War.

== Early life and education ==
Robert Lusk was born near the city of Derry, Ireland, to William Lusk and Elizabeth Holliday, on March 8, 1781. He was the youngest of five children. He emigrated to America, in 1792, with his parents, shortly before the Irish Rebellion of 1798. They settled in Cumberland County, Pennsylvania.

In 1804, he began to attend the Academy of Greensburgh, Pennsylvania, which prepared him for his course of study. After this, he entered Jefferson College, located in Canonsburg, Pennsylvania. The choice seemed quite natural for someone reared in a dissenting Presbyterian tradition. The College boasted an impressive number of graduates occupying ministerial connections in dissenting bodies, including Reformed Presbyterians, James R. Willson and James Milligan. There he studied mathematics and Natural philosophy with Samuel Miller, A.M.; languages and Moral philosophy with James Dunlap and, there, he began his theological matriculations under John McMillan, one of the founders of the school. This course of study concluded with Lusk graduating, in 1810. He had earned the degree of A.B.

== Advanced theological training and licensure to the ministry ==
=== Attending the Theological Seminary of the Reformed Presbyterian Church ===
By all accounts, he was endowed with superior intellect and displayed a thirst for knowledge. He was noted for his proficiency in both sciences and medicine. But it was in his theological studies that he displayed his endowments most signally. He studied theology in the Philadelphia Seminary (a Reformed Presbyterian school long since defunct) under the tutelage of Samuel B. Wylie. The Constitution of the Theological Seminary had restricted entrants to those "who had previously graduated some college or university," with allowances for rare exceptions. Lusk needed no exception; his course of study commenced immediately following his graduation from Jefferson College.

Prof. Samuel B. Wylie reports to Synod, in 1812, that Lusk had already attended his studies for two years. Furthermore, he had completed the "proper literature of the institution, and was prepared to enter the third class; agreeably to the constitution of the seminary." The said Constitution had provided that the first class would consist in Biblical Literature, in order to qualify the student to understand "the sacred text." The second class would consist in Pulpit Eloquence, in order to qualify the student to expound "in a persuasive manner the oracles of God." The third class would consist in Systematic and Polemic Theology. This was designed to establish the student in the "analogy of faith" pursuant to the Testimony of the Reformed Presbyterian Church and a studious eye to the Confessions of the Reformed Churches. It was a course of study designed to encompass four years. The first "class" occupied the first year; the second "class" occupied the second year; the third "class" occupied the third and fourth years.

=== Ministerial trials and licensing to preach ===
In 1814, Lusk, along with three other classmates, Jonathan Gill, Samuel Robinson and Robert Wallace, was requested by Synod to deliver a discourse, "in relation to systematic and polemical theology." Additionally, each received a theological examination with respect to "the analogy of faith, pursuing the plan laid down in the testimony of the Church." Prior to rendering its final verdict, the four were removed from the chamber, in order that observations might be freely made and judgments formed. When doubts were raised concerning Wallace, Wylie stated that "Wallace must be a proficient in Greek, as he had studied under the great Young." Additionally, it was stated, "That Lusk had more science than all in the class; but he was too proud—he must be humbled."

The Synod's examining board was satisfied with the results and declared that Lusk had honourably passed. Whereby, he was duly and fully certified by the Synod. At which point, Synod referred him to the Middle Presbytery for trial, "with a view to licensure, and if found duly qualified," to be licensed to preach the gospel as a minister of the Reformed Presbyterian Church. This was on May 7. Two days later, he was licensed by the Middle Presbytery, on May 9, 1814. On May 12, Middle Presbytery reported their action licensing Lusk to preach and delivered him back up to Synod for disposal. Synod instructed Lusk to move expeditiously to the Northern Presbytery.

In 1815, while still a licentiate, Lusk first visited the societies associated with the Elk (named for the Elk River), later re-christened Hephzibah, Reformed Presbyterian congregation, near Fayetteville, Tennessee, because they were without the benefit of a regular ministry.

On September 26, 1815, the Board of Trustees of Jefferson College met, at that meeting Dr. McMillan and his colleagues conferred several A.M. degrees. Among the honored was "Robert Lusk, of Cumberland county." Lusk's post-graduate studies were recognized by his alma mater.

== Ordination and first ministerial charge in the Reformed Presbyterian Church ==
He was ordained to the office of the ministry and installed pastor of the Conococheague congregation, Chambersburgh, Franklin County, Pennsylvania, on August 12, 1816. Conococheague had been a hive of Covenanter activity predating the erecting of the Reformed Presbytery, in 1798. That same year, he was married to Miss Margaret Thompson, of Conococheague, Pennsylvania, with whom he had two daughters, Hannah Anne (1819–1869) and Mary Jane (ca. 1820–1901). Margaret was the daughter of John Thomson [sic], who, along with John Renfrew, John Steele and John Scouller, was one of the four ruling elders of the congregation at this time.

Shortly after Lusk's installation, a log meeting house was erected in Greenwood, Pennsylvania.

=== Moderator of Synod, 1817 ===
Evidently, his esteem amongst his ministerial colleagues increased. He served as Moderator of the Synod, which met in Coldenham, New York, in 1817. Although it was common for moderators, at that time, to sit for portraits, Lusk is not represented in the commonality; there are no known images of this moderator, except those conjured up by words. At this meeting of Synod, Lusk was part of a committee, which also included Alexander McLeod and fellow Jefferson College alumnus James Milligan. In 1807, the Reformed Presbytery had proposed a plan to "exhibit their principles to the world," which, they explained, would embrace three parts. The first part was to be Historical and exhibit the Church in her visible society in covenant with God, at various points in history, particularly that situation which holds forth the Reformed Presbyterian Church as a distinct part of the Catholic Church. The second part was Declaratory, exhibiting "the truths which they embrace as a Church, and the errors which they reject." The third part was to be Argumentative and was to consist in full and critical investigations of the "various ecclesiastical systems which are known in the United States." The committee was appointed to inquire into the "propriety of redeeming" the decade old pledge of Synod to complete the argumentative defence "for truth and against errors and immoral practices." This was to form the third part of the testimony of the Church. The committee sat, deliberated, and bore fruit. In 1818, Synod began making assignments for drafting articles for this part of the Testimony. Although he was absent from Synod that year, Lusk was given the assignment to write critically on the "ecclesiastical system" of Methodism.

Sometime, in 1818, the Roxbury society was added to Shippensburg. Additionally, his time was divided ministering to Covenanter societies, in Newville, Walnut Bottom, Shippensburg, Green Township, Lurgan, and Waynesboro, small Pennsylvania towns scattered from some distance from his regular charge (mainly along what is today, Pennsylvania Route 997). However, he remained the stated, regular pastor of the Conococheague congregation until he tendered his resignation.

== Increasing participation in ecclesiastical governance ==
=== Activities on behalf of Synod ===
On December 15, 1818, he, along with Revs. Alexander McLeod and William Gibson, participated in the regular organization of the Baltimore, Maryland, Reformed Presbyterian congregation and the installation of John Gibson as its pastor. On August 10, 1819, the Synod of the Reformed Presbyterian Church met in Conococheague, John Cannon (who would again, in 1833, preside over the split into "Old Light" and "New Light" factions) presided, as moderator. At the beginning of this Synod, Lusk arose to read some of the minutes of the committee of Middle Presbytery relating to John Gibson's ordination and installation at Baltimore, after which Gibson was requested to be seated in Synod. At the close of Synod, he was requested to preach the opening sermon, on the substitutionary nature of Christ's sufferings, at the next meeting of Synod, to be held in 1821 at Samuel B. Wylie's church in Philadelphia.

On December 19, 1819, Lusk was once again in Baltimore, Maryland, where he and Alexander McLeod would help administer the sacrament of the Lord's supper for the first time in that congregation.

In 1821, Lusk opened the Synod with a sermon preached on Isaiah 53:5, "But he was wounded for our transgressions, he was bruised for our iniquities, the chastisement of our peace was upon him: and with his stripes we are healed." It must have been a pleasing performance; Synod requested he revise and submit a copy of the sermon to them, presumably for future publication. John Gibson was selected to be moderator and Lusk drew an assignment on the committee for Presbyterial reports. At this Synod, a resolution passed that members of Freemason Lodges could not be admitted into communicant membership in the Reformed Presbyterian Church. Synod's confidence in Lusk's competence in increasingly complex ecclesiastical matters is evidenced, when he, along with John Cannon, Samuel Wylie and James R. Willson, was chosen for the committee to reorganize and assist the Southern Presbytery. This Lusk and Cannon accomplished in the Spring of 1822. The success of the commission is attested by Cannon:

April 3, 1822. I went by the appointment of Synod, on a commission to South Carolina, where I met with Mr. Lusk, my fellow commissioner. There, in five weeks, Christ, by us, settled all disputes in that part of our church, rectified disorders, ordained Messrs. Maddan and H. M'Millan, administered the Lord's supper, and organized the Southern Presbytery. By God's blessing, I arrived safely at home on June 8.

=== Beginning of controversies ===
In the midst of the Synodic meeting, the Philadelphia Presbytery presented a reference and documents which, then, were referred to the committee on Order and Discipline. It was a case carried up from the session of Conococheague. The next day, October 23, after review, Synod found no warrant for interference in the case. Nonetheless, they did find it advisable to inform the Philadelphia Presbytery that the moderator of any session has a duty to put forth any motion regularly submitted for sessional consideration. This, they instructed, was a matter of Presbyterian order. If the moderator had any reason to object, he may do so by appeal to a superior church court. Lusk being the moderator of the Conococheague session, this is the first indication of the trouble that was to erupt.

==== The monetary root of the personal turmoil ====
Lusk had been pastor in Conococheague since 1816. As such, he had been promised a set salary for his labors. Over the course of several years, the congregation had failed to pay all the monies owed. Lusk had kept an "account" against the congregation. According to Lusk, he sold the "account" (i.e., the debt) for the best advantage he could obtain because the Synod had acted to defraud him of "upwards of $2000." Furthermore, he claimed that, contrary to his critics, "To sell the account was as proper as to sell his horse."

His father-in-law, Thompson (or Thomson), together with John Renfrew, had brought the matter of Lusk selling the debt and the suit that followed before the Philadelphia Presbytery. Through the Presbytery, Samuel B. Wylie preferred charges against Lusk of "suing the congregation and disobeying the presbytery." Lusk claimed the court docket, in the civil transaction, for the case against the congregation showed that the counsel (i.e., lawyer) for the purchaser of the debt was also in the employ of Samuel B. Wylie. Additionally, Wylie and his nephew, Samuel Wylie Crawford, held a mortgage, for $10,000, against John Thompson, who was also one of the ruling elders of the Conococheague congregation.

In 1821, as the moderator pro tem, Samuel B. Wylie also had the opportunity to nominate the committee that would be commissioned to report on the charges against Lusk.

==== The "jury law" and the ecclesiastical turmoil ====
In addition, there was the continued agitation of opposition to the standing testimony of the Church. According to Lusk, at the Synod of 1821, Alexander McLeod "reported to Synod: 'That no connection with the laws, the officers, or the order of the State, is prohibited by the church, except what truly involves immorality.'" This met with staunch opposition. A few days after, on the morning of October 23. Samuel B. Wylie tactically "requested an extrajudicial meeting of members at his house when they would adjourn at noon." They met, and two questions were put to each of the several members. The first asked whether or not a new edition of Reformation Principles Exhibited, the Testimony of the church, be published. All were in agreement respecting its desideratum. The second question asked whether the earlier Acts of the church which prohibited swearing oaths before magistrates and sitting on juries ought to be left out of the new edition. These questions were beginning to agitate amongst those in the ministry and the Church was of two minds on these matters. At Wylie's house, no reasons were admitted in answer to the query. Only Gilbert McMaster, James Milligan and Lusk opposed the measure. When Synod reconvened, later that afternoon, the motion was put forward to omit the Acts from the Testimony and place them in a "digest." It was carried immediately, only finding opposition in Lusk, Gilbert McMaster, and James Milligan. Lusk was beginning to question the motives and methods his colleagues were utilizing to amend the Testimony of the church. Over twenty years later, when relating this account, he compliments the "projectors" for their craft and laments the trickery he perceived on their part which effectively hid the law of the church from generations following. The matter was sufficiently unclear that it arose again, in the next Synod, and had to be referred to a committee. Wylie would use this tactic again, in 1832, after he and his "New Light" friends were unable to carry their point during the session of the meeting of the Eastern Subordinate Synod.

In 1806, The Reformed Presbytery had resolved that, "it appears to this Court that serving on juries in the civil courts of judicature in the United States or in any one of the States, is inconsistent with the Testimony of the Reformed Presbyterian Church." Indeed, in Reformation Principles Exhibited, published in 1807, the Reformed Presbytery had declared that, "Jurors are executive officers created by the constitution." Additionally, they noted, "The juror voluntarily places himself upon oath, under the direction of a law which is immoral." They concluded, "The Reformed Presbytery declare this practice inconsistent with their Testimony, and warn Church-members against serving on juries under the direction off the constituted courts of law." Indeed, "Narrative" portion of Reformation Principles Exhibited stated that, "The act of Presbytery [in 1806] respecting serving on juries, is absolutely prohibitory." This assertion becomes of greater interest, when it is realized that the same Presbytery, meeting in 1806, passed both the act concerning juries and, on May 15 instant, "unanimously" approved adoption and publication of the "Narrative" portion of Reformation Principles Exhibited. Included in the "unanimous" vote were ministers who were now trying to undermine the "law" embodied in that act.

=== "Occasional hearing" and discipline in the local congregation ===
During his Conococheague pastorate, in 1821, Lusk, and his session, were called to hear several cases relating to the practice of "occasional hearing." At this time, both Covenanters and Seceders were very strict in their enforcement of the rule against "occasional hearing." In at least two of the cases, two women, members of the Reformed Presbyterian Church, who had been citied for attending a Methodist camp-meeting, in Shippensburg. In the Reformed Presbyterian Church, admonition is the lowest degree of censure consisting "in warning the offender of his guilt, and in exhorting him to walk circumspectly for the future." The rule against "occasional hearing" was enforced and, perhaps, Methodism being a subject somewhat familiar to Lusk, the women were "severely admonished." (emphasis added)

== Dissolving the pastoral relationship with Conococheague and accepting a new call ==
=== Growing dissatisfaction in Pennsylvania ===
Again, in October, 1822, Lusk visited the Elk Reformed Presbyterian congregation, near Fayetteville, Tennessee. They were still without regular ministry and, in the course of ministering to the people, Lusk administered the Lord's supper in a grove. Such was the life of an itinerating minister, in those days, serving the scattered societies of Covenanters. According to Glasgow, in his History, Lusk's ministry, at this time, "was neither a happy nor a prosperous one," and when combined with attendant monetary difficulties, he resigned and was regularly released from the charge, on October 15, 1823.

The unhappiness of Lusk's charge in Conococheague might have stemmed, in part, from the circuit riding required by the scattered Covenanter societies. It certainly was not relieved by his wife's death, sometime in 1823, shortly prior to his departure from Pennsylvania. After all, this left him a widower with two young daughters and responsibilities that required a lot of travel away from home. This, exasperated by "monetary difficulties," led to tensions within the congregation. These tensions are apparent at the opening of the Synod, in 1823. John Steele, a ruling elder, from the Conococheague congregation presented himself and desired to be seated. Lusk questioned the legality of his certificate, which was issued by the local session and signed by its clerk, ruling elder John Thomson. It was required for being a delegate to Synod. Lusk noted that the certificate lacked a copy of the protest against John Steele being sent as a delegate which was lodged by the moderator of the session. Since it was the usual role for the pastor to assume the position of moderator in the local session, Lusk is complaining that the congregation has sent John Steele as a delegate over his clearly stated objections. Lusk then presented his protest to the court of Synod and was overturned. John Steele, as a ruling elder, was seated.

=== Two ministerial opportunities arise ===
As Synod proceeded, Lusk was assigned to the committee on the Signs of the Times, a committee entrusted with drafting causes of fasting and causes of thanksgiving. This was followed by a call for papers. At this time, two papers were presented from two societies related to the Elk Reformed Presbyterian congregation, near Fayetteville, Tennessee. Immediately following, Lusk petitioned Synod for a disjunction from the Conococheague congregation. On the following day, August 6, 1823, Synod granted Lusk's request. On August 7, the committee on Presbyterial Reports, upon examining the written documents pertaining to the "protests" in the Lusk case, in the Conococheague session books and papers of the Philadelphia Presbytery, recommended obliterating all minutes mentioning the controversies, saving only those minutes pertaining to his actual removal. Furthermore, they confirmed granting the disjunction. The same day, the Synod received a second call for Lusk from the Walnut Ridge congregation, Washington County, Indiana. This was referred to the committee handling the papers from Elk congregation. The morning session ended that day with Lusk requesting his protest against the decision of the court (recommending the destruction of minutes and, presumably, all official records of the controversy) be duly noted. He said he was obliged to "protest" and would furnish his reasons later. On August 11, Synod enjoined Lusk to deliberate quickly and indicate which, if either, of the calls he would accept. On the last day of Synod, August 12, Lusk informed Synod of his intention to accept the call from Walnut Ridge. Whereupon, Synod instructed the Philadelphia Presbytery to issue a certificate of honourable dismission to the Western Presbytery. The Western Presbytery was, in turn, instructed to make no delay installing Lusk as pastor of Walnut Ridge.

If Lusk was considered the instigator of the controversy that preceded his departure from Conococheague, it seems highly unlikely that two diverse regional societies of Covenanters would have tendered him a call to the ministry. The conclusion seems borne out by the fact that Synod, at no point, indicates an inclination to censure, or in any way discipline, Lusk for the controversy. In fact, it is hard to imagine Synod enjoining a candidate of dubious morals or practice to make a timely decision relative to future pastoral settlement. Additionally, they "instructed" lower church courts to dismiss Lusk honourably and receive him readily. Yet, there clearly was a controversy. It was a controversy that issued in the call for the destruction of minutes by a committee of Synod and a solemn protest on the part of Lusk. In fact, it appears that the controversy surrounded protests made by Lusk to the Philadelphia Presbytery. It appears that these "protests" lodged with Presbytery, which became part of the referral to Synod, fueled his desire to leave Conococheague. Apparently, Presbytery and Synod blunted the intended discipline of his "protests."

=== Synod and "occasional hearing" ===
Lusk found himself involved in one other controversial matter at Synod that year. The Bethel, Illinois congregation petitioned the Synod for guidance in some matters of discipline. It was a question concerning "occasional hearing." Synod opted not to enter into the merits of the question. Instead they rehearse a general concern for discipline amongst the congregations but leave it entirely to the "discretion of the local authorities," which might be construed as allowing cases of "occasional hearing." Yet, they eschewed Synodical interference by enjoining a strict adherence to the "good old way." An amendment was proposed to address the specific concern of the petition. A motion was made to insert the words, "to apply the principles of the church, to cases as they occurred," before the phrase "local authorities." By "local authorities," the petition meant sessions. Lusk was one of four supporting the insertion. Without that clause, according to Lusk, "news carried that the Synod had done away [with] occasional hearing."

== Relocation to Indiana and second charge ==
In 1823, Lusk removed to Indiana, along with his two young daughters, travelling by flatboat along the Ohio River. His journey was as an itinerant minister and, in time, he arrived at Walnut Ridge. Over the course of two weeks, he preached from house to house amongst the faithful adherents of the Reformed Presbyterian Church. After this, he was installed pastor of the congregation of Walnut Ridge, Washington County, on October 7, 1824. His ministry was successful and the congregation grew, eventually erecting a log meeting house.

=== New domestic relations ===
Around this time, he also married his second wife, Miss Mary Reid, of Walnut Ridge, Indiana, in 1824. With her, he had an additional nine children, Margaret Holliday (1825–1857), Samuel Adams (1827–1880), Elizabeth (1829–1857), Grizzel (1831–1911), William Reid (1833–1916), Robert (1836–1857), Isaiah Reid (1838–1862), Isabella Maria (1841–1933), and the youngest was a son, named David Steele Lusk (1844–1916; clearly named after his fellow "controversialist" and ministerial colleague). Somewhat unusual for that time, all eleven children survived him. Additionally, five of his children lived into the 20th century.

Upon arriving in Walnut Ridge, Lusk entered two eighty acre tracts of land from the government, thus acquiring a homestead. Lusk spent his time in Walnut Ridge farming extensively and ministering to the Covenanters in the area. This property was later conveyed to his son William Reid. Being widely regarded as an educated man, in a place, at that time destitute of many educational opportunities, his influence grew. His home became a seminary of study, as young men came from afar to borrow his books and to receive his tutelage.

=== The genesis of the charges brought against Lusk ===
After Lusk's arrival, he learned of the existence of a Masonic Lodge, in the neighboring town of Salem, Indiana. "Mr. Lusk, 'as a minister and a witness,' among other social sins, had borne public testimony against Freemasonry."

Shortly, after Lusk's installation as pastor, his medical skills and hospitality became the occasion for the charges that would lead to his first expulsion from the ministry by the Reformed Presbyterian Church of North America. A member of the Walnut Ridge congregation had fallen ill. Lusk took him into his house, tended to his illness, thus offering room and board together with medical care, during the man's protracted illness. After his recovery, in seeming gratitude and recompense, the man engaged in the clearing of some of Lusk's farm.

Afterward, this man being, in the words of David Steele, "inveigled into the lodge," he ceased to be a member of the Walnut Ridge congregation. Upon becoming a Freemason, whether for personal revenge for being cast out of the church, or at the instigation of the Lodge, he stepped forward and accused Lusk, his former pastor and benefactor, of defrauding him of his services in clearing the land. Lusk, when confronted, "made oath" that he did not owe the amount of the prosecutor's claim. From this arose the fama clamosa that formed the basis of the charges brought before the next Synod.

== Clashes with synodical authority ==
=== The Synod of 1825 and deposition from the ministry of the Reformed Presbyterian Church ===
The Synod of 1825 convened in New York City, on August 2. James R. Willson preached the opening sermon. Lusk and Samuel Wylie [not Samuel B. Wylie] were the only two ministers from the Western Presbytery. On August 5, papers were recorded from Walnut Ridge, Princeton, Indiana, and South Carolina. These were referred to the committee on Discipline and pertained to the question of the "jury law." The "jury law" was again before the Synod. Any harmony on this question had disappeared years before, now the factions were forming.

On August 8, the Synod reported and attempted to quell the "misunderstanding" by passing a resolution that stated that Synod never intended to contravene "the old common law of our church on that subject." It was further resolved that this be made known in the Southern Presbytery. Glasgow has noted the "discord" present in that Synod, particularly with regard to ministers and members involvement in matters of "civil government" (e.g., the "jury law"). Two prevailing parties were forming. This double-mindedness would lead to the rupture and division into "Old Lights" and "New Lights," in the Synod of 1833.

==== Presbyterial incompetence discovered by Synod ====
On the morning of August 9, the special committee assigned to review the Presbyterial charges against Lusk was called to give report. In the meanwhile, Lusk observing he had communications to make, "presented two papers to the Moderator," James Milligan, "intimating verbally his purpose of withdrawing from our connexion, and bidding the Moderator farewell, he left the house." As is apparent from what follows, Lusk regarded not only the charges sustained by the Western Presbytery as baseless, he also must have raised some question as to ability to receive a fair trial under that jurisdiction. Immediately before addressing his case, the special committee expressed its "decided disapproval" of the conduct of the Western Presbytery in its handling of another disciplinary matter. Their disapproval was with regard to the Western Presbytery's admission and incorporation of "foreign and libellous matter" in their report. In other words, they had sustained charges without ample witnesses and augmented these charges with matter that might have been pejorative but certainly was immaterial to the matter at hand. This committee, consisting of Alexander McLeod, James R. Willson and Hugh McMillan, then began to address the case of Lusk. They began with the resolution that "the Rev. Robert Lusk be disannexed from the Western Presbytery, and that he be attached to the Presbytery of Pittsburgh. Indicating that the committee lacked confidence in the Western Presbytery with regard to this matter.

==== Lusk's "protest" and "declinature" ====
With this resolution before the court, Synod moved that the papers Lusk deposited with the moderator be examined. The committee was instructed to suspend any further comment until the general import of Lusk's papers could be determined. Some years later, Lusk noted that he left because he had concluded that the Synod was null in its organization and, therefore, its acts were all void. For example, he noted, the Presbytery of Philadelphia had supplied six members in their delegation to Synod, but none of them were certified by the Presbytery. Furthermore, by standing statute, at that time, the Philadelphia Presbytery was only entitled to send four delegates. He was concerned it was a packed court and so, "neither a lawful meeting nor a free court." This, in some measure, was what he told them in his papers—the first, his "protest;" the second, his "declinature." The minutes state that upon "examining Mr. Lusk's papers, which were almost illegibly written, it was found that they contained a 'protest' and 'declinature,' and declared the authority of this court a nullity." Thus, Lusk departed what he believed to be an unlawful meeting and "disregarded its charges."

The court of Synod responded by issuing a summons for Lusk to return, appear and "answer such questions as might be proposed to him, and to read his own papers." The citation was delivered to him, at his place of lodging, attended with witnesses. Lusk refused to answer and did not appear. A second time he was summoned, this time James Milligan accompanied the citation. Lusk made Milligan to understand that he had no intention of returning to appear before Synod. After all, he deemed it unlawful and its acts void. The following morning, August 10, Lusk was summoned a third time, to appear at 9 am before Synod, but he could not be found.

His concern that the court was packed, undoubtedly arose from his increasing distrust of those presbyters who openly, or secretly, were espousing what would later be denominated "New Light" views. The ministers from the Philadelphia Presbytery, Samuel B. Wylie, John Gibson and Samuel W. Crawford, would all go out in the split, in 1833. Their sympathies were already becoming known. Additionally, in 1828, the Synod adopted a series of Rules for Directing the Proceedings of Synod in which Lusk's concern about members being certified is addressed. Rule No. 2 stated unqualifiedly, "The members of the Court shall be ascertained—the Clerk calling for, and publicly reading their certificates of appointment, from their respective Presbyteries." It was also reported that, in the Synod of 1831, there was no little controversy surrounding the attempt of the Philadelphia Presbytery to pack the court. They showed up displaying total disregard for the delegate system established and proceeded to try to get all of their members seated in Synod. After much heated exchange, they failed to accomplish their designs.

From the standpoint of Presbyterian procedure, the Synod had admitted that Lusk was right to raise his concerns. From the standpoint of Presbyterian law, the Synod of 1825 had violated the trust of the delegate system established by the Presbyteries and its organization was, therefore, at best, questionable; at worst, Lusk was right, it was a nullity.

==== Suspension and deposition ====
On August 10, 1825, the final day of the Synod, the matter concerning Lusk was again taken up. At this point, the court declared that Lusk had been "notorious" in his pursuit of "a disorderly course, in violation of the obligations by which he was bound to promote the edification and unity of this church, which has issued in his renouncing the authority of this Court, in contradiction to his ordination vows." Lusk, when he had been ordained, had among other things, vowed to be in subjection "to the superior Judicatories of this Church in the Lord, and engage to follow no divisive courses from the doctrine and order which the Church has solemnly recognized and adopted." Upon this finding, Synod declared Lusk suspended from the exercise of his ministry, and from church fellowship. Additionally, the pastoral relationship was declared dissolved and the pulpit of the Walnut Ridge congregation was declared vacated by authority of Synod. Samuel Wylie was asked to preach a sermon to the congregation clearing the matter, or if not in his power, his substitute was to be Gavin McMillan. In this connection, Glasgow mentions the charge of defrauding his neighbor, which, although not expressly mentioned, was certainly that which gave occasion to all that followed. Lusk perceived a difference between subjection to his ministerial brethren and subjection in the Lord to his brethren. He chose the later course.

At the Synod of 1827, it was enquired of Samuel Wylie, whether or not he had carried out the orders of Synod by declaring, in the bounds of the congregation of Walnut Ridge, the dissolution of the pastoral relationship and Lusk's suspension and deposition. He replied that he had attempted to carry out the wishes of Synod, but had been "prevented by the congregation." His alternate, Gavin McMillan, reported he had managed to carry into execution the orders of Synod.

=== Re-application, review and restoration to the ministry of the Reformed Presbyterian Church ===
==== "Wilderness" obscurity ====
Lusk remained in the vicinity of Walnut Ridge, on his farm, living "for some years in comparative obscurity...under an act of suspension by General Synod in New York city in 1825." In 1833, the Synod, which had been in turmoil for some years, finally split into "Old Lights" and "New Lights." This event proved to be the catalyst to move Lusk to seek rapprochement. Steele, who had been clerk at that eventful Synod of 1833, relates, "After our division in Philadelphia, 1833, Mr. Lusk charitably hoped that we who were known as "Old Lights" were purged from preceding error and disorder. Having read our Minutes, and seeing my name as Clerk, he addressed me by letter, in which he said, 'These are the first honest Minutes of Synod, and the only ones that can be legally used as testimony.' He also expressed his desire for restoration to our fellowship. In reply, I encouraged him to make regular application to the Ohio Presbytery."

==== The Ohio Presbytery investigates the fama clamosa ====
===== Two Commissions, two conclusions =====
Lusk made his application, in person, to the Ohio Presbytery, "earnestly" desiring them to send a commission and investigate the local fama clamosa. His petition was granted, and Charles B. McKee and John B. Johnston, with two ruling elders, including S. Hyndman, were deputed to investigate the charges of "fraud and perjury." They were sent to Walnut Ridge, "to take testimony and report to Presbytery." They collected what they said was "all [emphasis in the original] the testimony in the case," and submitted the report to the next Presbytery, in 1835, Lusk also being present. Lusk, upon hearing the report read, complained of the partiality of the commission, especially the ministers. Apparently, McKee, the chairman of the commission, made an appointment to preach to the Presbyterians in Salem, Indiana, on his way to Walnut Ridge. The engagement made impossible completing the commission's duties. Lusk complained that "the Commission finally adjourned while two of his witnesses were standing on the floor!" In other words, they had not, as they had claimed collected all the testimony. Lusk requested another commission be appointed by Presbytery and his request was granted. This commission consisted of John Wallace, son of his former seminary classmate, and David Steele, along with William Ramsay and Robert Craig, ruling elders. Their assignment was to investigate the charge of partiality and, if found true, to gather the remaining testimony. The charge of partiality they found proved, "not only by the two witnesses who had been left 'standing on the floor,' but by other members." The two reports of the two commissions were in conflict. The documentary evidence of the first commission had been demonstrated to be incomplete. After protracted discussion, the Presbytery referred the case to the Western Subordinate Synod for adjudication.

===== The Western Subordinate Synod adjudicates =====
When the Western Subordinate Synod met, Lusk was again present, and he was called upon to make his defense. John B. Johnston "argued and strenuously insisted" denying "the legality [emphasis in the original] of hearing the defendant at all!" Furthermore, he asserted, the court must rest their decision "solely on the written [emphasis in the original] testimony," the very "documentary evidence" which was in dispute. At this point, James Blackwood, later moderator of the Synod of 1838, arose and administered a "stinging rebuke," asking, "Moderator, shall this court be insulted by refusing to hear a culprit at your bar?" A motion followed immediately, without taking or asking for additional testimony, requesting Lusk to declare before Synod "his sorrow for having been the cause of so much trouble to the church." As David Steele, who was present and a participant, notes, Lusk was not being asked to express sorrow for having committed the facts charged. Lusk, in tears, visibly shaken by the motion, replied, "Moderator, I cannot make that acknowledgement and be an honest man." An amendment was offered. A member of the Subordinate Synod moved that the "for the word cause be substituted the word occasion. Mr. Lusk, understanding "the import and force of language," and thus the difference, immediately assented. He was then "restored," or as Steele expressed it, "rather recognized as in full possession of all the rights of a brother in the ministry."

After his restoration to the ministry he was appointed stated supply to the Princeton congregation, in Gibson County, Indiana. He was re-installed pastor of Walnut Ridge, on May 9, 1835. In both these connections he continued until the disruption of 1840. During this period of time, he rode to and from both Illinois and Pennsylvania, preaching to the faithful as opportunity presented itself.

== Exercising his ministry in subsequent ecclesiastical courts ==
=== Synod of 1836 ===
"Possessing all the rights of a brother in the ministry," a member of the Ohio Presbytery, Lusk appears again in the Synod of 1836. Early in the day, on October 7, Lusk was assigned to the committee on the Signs of the Times, a committee designed to call attention to the current state of religion in both church and society. Later that same day, Synod notes the "happy issue" in his case and his restoration "to the exercise [emphasis added] of his office," as reported by the Western Subordinate Synod.

On October 9, he was appointed to a committee set to consider the "draught of a book of government." On the last day of Synod, October 13, Lusk was appointed to the committee on the Signs for the Times to report at the next Synod, in 1838.

==== The Brush Creek Memorial on "voluntary associations" ====
At this Synod, the Brush Creek, Ohio congregation, pastored by David Steele, had memorialized concerning the involvement of various congregations in "voluntary associations," particularly the American Colonization Society. The intention of the memorial, according to Steele was, not merely to address defects in the American Colonization Society, but to raise the issue of "voluntary associations" under whatever guise. Lusk would later confess that "he had not duly considered nor clearly perceived the corrupting and ruinous influence of existing voluntary associations, until Providence" had brought him into acquaintance with Steele. In this cause, it seems, Steele was first; however, they would find each other mutually instructive over the coming years.

Synod ignored the broader issue and chose simply to "withdraw the approbation given to the colonization society, and transfer our approbation and patronage to the cause of abolition." Steele, together with Lusk, James Faris, and several others dissented from the resolution of Synod and they requested their dissent be noted.

==== Ohio Presbytery and preparation for the next Synod, 1837 ====
In 1837, the first meeting of the Ohio Presbytery was held April 26, in Utica. The chairman of the standing committee [David Steele], appointed by the Presbytery, "to transact any business growing out of the case of Mr. Armour McFarland" reported. Although all six members of the committee had been notified of the intention to meet, three members were absent, including John B. Johnston. Without a quorum, the committee declined to meet. Since the time the McFarland case had been referred to the Western Subordinate Synod, John B. Johnston had been circulating letters throughout the Ohio Presbytery casting his fellow presbyters in an unflattering light. He had been so successful that another minister, Samuel McKinney along with several elders, made it clear that they intended to do something about it. It was rumored that they intended to ordain McFarland at the next meeting of Presbytery, in September, 1837. With this rumor circulating, and McFarland's attendant refusal to answer the court, the Presbytery held in April passed a resolution declaring the forfeiture of McFarland's licensure previously issued by the court.

When Presbytery met, in September, 1837, near Brush Creek, Ohio, Johnston had, by letters, managed to assemble opposition. On motion from McKinney, it was resolved that steps be taken to secure McFarland's ordination as early as the following Monday. Steele and Lusk viewed this as high-handed subversion of the order of the Church. They protested and appealed to the Western Subordinate Synod. By vote, the elders present at the Presbytery appointed a committee to answer the reasons given in the protest. Johnston and McKinney were included in that committee. No answers were given, no investigation pursued; only plans to ordain McFarland without removing his suspension.

==== The Western Subordinate Synod seeks compromise with both parties ====
A few weeks later, the Western Subordinate Synod was set to meet, in Brush Creek, Ohio, in October 1837. The McFarland case had been sent up for review. The Ohio Presbytery was divided over McFarland's suspension, although a majority had acted to suspend him. The Western Subordinate Synod, being composed principally of the Ohio and Pittsburgh Presbyteries (the Western Presbytery being, at that time, small by comparison), the outcome would be determined by the strength of support McFarland could garner in the Pittsburgh Presbytery. Prior to its meeting, according to Steele, John B. Johnston's campaign of writing letters had worked to bias "the minds of the ministers of the Pittsburg [sic] Presbytery in favor of Mr. McFarland." In fact, Steele commented, "It was known to all concerned, that for error and contumacy, Mr. McFarland had been laid under suspension by the Ohio Presbytery." When the case was raised, the result was the appeal was sustained; however, the Western Subordinate Synod, divided the Ohio Presbytery in two, established the Lakes Presbytery, and the Lakes Presbytery, under the direction of John B. Johnston, ordained McFarland, October 5, 1837. This they proceeded to do without even bothering to vacate the suspension of the Ohio Presbytery.

The Western Subordinate Synod was the creature of the Synod of 1831. Without dispute, the Synod had the power to "unmake" its creature—the Subordinate Synod. However, the Synod, first erected in 1809, was the creature of the Presbyteries. As such, Synod possesses no power to "unmake" Presbyteries. In fact, the Western Subordinate Synod was two degrees removed from its source of authority (i.e., from Presbyteries to Synod to Subordinate Synod). The right of one Presbytery (i.e., the Pittsburgh), through its delegates, at Synod, not only to overthrow the judicial sentence of, but to divide, another Presbytery (i.e., the Ohio), is contrary to Presbyterian polity and order. "The power of the synod is not destructive of the power of subordinate courts." The complicity of the Western Subordinate Synod, in this "illegal act," did not go unnoticed by Steele or Lusk.

=== Synod of 1838 ===
The Synod of 1838 was held in October, in New York. "The Synod was asked, in 1838, most respectfully, formally, and explicitly, to review and rectify some cases of high-handed tyranny, chiefly through the influence of that party who caused the lamentable breach in 1833; as some of the subjects of that tyranny were yet writhing under a sense of accumulated wrongs." Lusk was not present, but he sent a "letter," in reality, a petition, for their consideration. It was received and numbered "1." Upon reading the letter/petition, it was referred to a special committee. The committee was composed of James Milligan, Samuel M. Willson, and William Cowan, Sr., a ruling elder. Upon motion, David Steele was added. The content remains unmentioned in the minutes, but its contents are not wholly unknown. Lusk states that he had requested a copy of the minutes of the sub-commission sent to Walnut Ridge, in 1835.

In 1850, David Steele made public the specific nature of the contents of the letter:

Some thought it dutiful to call Synod's attention to these matters, and a petition was laid before them, from Rev. Robert Lusk, requesting that certain cases of discipline, which the petitioner specified, be reviewed; and especially asking, that "the term testimony [emphasis in the original] be restored to its former ecclesiastical use." As this was, in our deliberate opinion, the most important measure brought under the cognizance of the church representative in America, during the current of the nineteenth century, it was thought the court would take the matter under deliberate consideration. Whether through ignorance of the matter proposed, or that sectional interests engrossed the attention of parties, or that the prevailing majority desired to be untrammeled in their future course, the petition was smuggled through and shuffled by, under the cognomen of a "letter," which a member of Synod answered on behalf of the court, as though it were a matter of the smallest importance imaginable! We solemnly testify against this manner of disposing of a weighty matter at that time, whether through inattention or design.

The next day, the committee reported on the letter. The report was "accepted, amended and adopted."

Lusk had identified what he, and others, believed to be the source of so much controversy over the preceding years. The defect, he believed, had led to the phenomena of "two people" in the womb of one mother—the Reformed Presbyterian Church. Later he would give vent that the minutes styled his "petition" a "letter." Writing on this matter, in 1886, David Steele would, again, identify this moment as one of great significance in the direction the Reformed Presbyterian Church was going. He relates, "A member was directed merely to answer the 'LETTER.' So the petition was deceptively called on [sic] the Minutes." Describing the unruly nature of the Synod of 1838, he continued, "At that meeting a licentiate [Francis Gailey] and some adherents publicly declined the authority of Synod, amid tumult and personal violence too disgraceful for detail. They had previously entered into a Safety League."

== The gathering issues and the definitive moment ==
Years between Synods were proving to be fertile times for sowing more seeds of dissention. The period between the Synods of 1838 and 1840 would be no different.

=== Ohio Presbytery, the 1839 memorial and the 1840 choice of delegates ===
==== "Voluntary associations" ====
The issue of "voluntary associations" was still live. At the Fall meeting of Presbytery, October 28, 1839, the committee appointed to study the "Brush Creek memorial" regarding "voluntary associations" was called to report. They began by noting, "the Church of Christ in regarding her own doctrines and order, is to be instrumental in the hand of her blessed Lord to effect moral reform and bless the earth with peace; and that all confederacies, separate from her in organization, affecting to perform her exclusive work and obtain her appropriate object, are unauthorized by her glorious Head, form no part of the profession of her faith, nor exemplify the sanctified exercise of the constitutional powers of her members, and immoral, as a way or means, however otherwise desirable the object." Then, they proposed the following resolutions be adopted by the Presbytery:

1. That members of the Reformed Presbyterian Church, unnecessarily familiar, confederate, or holding visible communion with the infidel or the heretic, is a violation of plighted faith and solemn covenant engagements.

2. That such confederacy is contrary to the authority and word of God.

3. That it is opposed to the approved practice of the Church; and—

4. That it does not manifest the intelligent and sanctified activity of the sensibilities or affections of the heart and the powers of the mind;—all the active principles of the rational and accountable creature.

The committee was composed of Lusk and Robert Wallace, his former seminary classmate. Presbytery asked that these resolutions be inserted in the Reformed Presbyterian magazine, but Moses Roney, the editor, did not comply.

==== Flaws in the delegate system reappear ====
In 1840, the Ohio Presbytery met shortly before the meeting of Synod held in June. The four constituent members of the Presbytery were Robert Wallace and his son John Wallace, together with Lusk, Steele and ruling elders. The rules of Synod provided that only three of four ministers in any Presbytery could be delegated to be accompanied by an equal number of ruling elders. The elder Wallace, who presided as moderator of Presbytery, and Steele were chosen to be delegates and elected without opposition. Lusk and the younger Wallace were nominated. Upon standing for election, each candidate received an equal number of votes. In Presbyterian courts, the moderator has no vote, unless there is a tie. In this case, the father cast the deciding vote for his son. Afterward, it was made clear that an additional elder had been recently ordained to effect this outcome. As Steele relates, "It had been well known for years preceding that the ministers were equally divided in judgment and practice on matters of grave interest to the whole church. To secure two of the three ministers as delegates to the supreme judicatory, and so help to carry popular measures, was the declared object of ordaining the new elder. So Mr. Robert Ardery, one of Robert Wallace's elders, distinctly understood. He was a man of intelligence and probity in the estimation of his brethren." As Lusk and Steele saw it, the delegate system was allowing the court to be packed to "reach carnal ends by the votes of a majority."

When this account was challenged, in 1867, by Thomas Sproull, in the pages of the Reformed Presbyterian and Covenanter, Steele responded with the information needed to verify. Sproull published the response but remained unsatisfied with the imputation of motives. Whatever the motive, Lusk would not be a delegate, but he would be present for the confrontation.

=== Synod of 1840 ===
The Synod of 1840 met in Allegheny, Pennsylvania, in June. The delegation from the Ohio Presbytery consisted in Robert Wallace, John Wallace and David Steele, ministers; and William McKinley, John Jamison and William Wylie, ruling elders. On motion, Lusk was added as a consultavive member. As Steele notes, "By a rule in all ecclesiastical courts, such a member has no vote, nor can he make or second a motion; but he is allowed to participate in the discussions."

The report of the Eastern Subordinate Synod concluded with, among other admonitions, a warning concerning "occasional hearing." There was a strong statement in response to a letter from Dr. John T. Pressley, of the Associate Reformed Church, warning the Synod and her members against "occasional communion." Additionally, much time was taken up concerning church government, particularly with respect to the office of deacon. Lusk was able to observe and converse, but he was unable to direct or enforce the matters to be discussed. He was as active as these restrictions allowed.

==== The end of delegates and subordinate synods ====
Late on the first day of Synod, the committee on Synodical Reports, consisting of James Blackwood, Robert Wallace and John Z. Willson, ruling elder, was given instructions. They were to determine the "propriety of abolishing the Sub. Synods and Delegated form of General Synod." On motion from Blackwood, David Steele was added. On the afternoon of June 25, the committee reported. Blackwood reported with very little "preamble" that "the Sub. Synods be directed to adjourn sine die, at the close of their next sessions, and that the delegation system be abolished after the present sessions of General Synod, and the Synod be constituted as it was previously to the year 1825."

According to Steele, Blackwood insisted Steele write the report himself. He complied and, with the seeming consent of the chairman, he recommended "abolishing the delegation form of the General Synod, by an orderly action of the presbyteries, from which it had derived its existence." He knew what he had penned, but had no knowledge of whether or not others on the committee had been consulted. He expressed surprise and chagrin when Blackwood, on the following day, "offered the astounding and unpresbyterial motion" which called for the abolition of both the delegation form and the two Subordinate Synods.

However, for Lusk and Steele, the defining controversy played out over the course of the duration of Synod.

== The reconstituted Reformed Presbytery and remaining years ==
=== The generation work begins ===
On June 26, Synod adjourned with prayer and the singing of Psalm 133:

Behold, how good a thing it is,
and how becoming well,
Together such as brethren are
in unity to dwell!

After the close of Synod, which Steele describes as, "public, irregular and unpresbyterial transactions," several of those in the minority gathered together. After a "free exchange of views," it was concluded that they should together constitute an independent presbytery. Accordingly, on June 27, 1840, Lusk, as the senior minister, together with David Steele, and three ruling elders, William McKinley, William Wylie and Nathan Johnston, constituted the Reformed Presbytery.

DEED OF CONSTITUTION.

We, the undersigned, ministers and elders of the Reformed Presbyterian Church in North America, familiar with, and having long witnessed declension in the aforesaid church, and employed all other scriptural means to stay its progress without effect: Also recognizing the claims of the Lord Jesus Christ, and of all such as desire let be faithful; compassionating the condition of those who, by unholy confederacies, are still "entangled in the wilderness" considering the necessities or others, who, to maintain a good, conscience, have been constrained to unite in the "Safety League," which covers the whole ground of our covenanted system:—Do now, trusting to the faithfulness of the God of our fathers, and relying on the strength or promised grace; after the example or the venerable Rev. William Gibson, who "kept the faith,"—enter and record our solemn protestation against the aforesaid church, because she has corrupted the doctrines and worship, and prostituted the government and discipline of the house of God; and we do hereby decline the authority of all her judicatories.

We acknowledge the supreme authority or the Lord Jesus Christ, the only King and Head of his church; the binding obligation of the solemn deeds of our covenanted forefathers—resting upon our souls, by our own, voluntary engagements, viz: besides the word of God, the Westminster Confession of Faith, Catechisms, Larger and Shorter, the Directory for Worship as they were received by the Church of Scotland in her purest times, i.e. between the years 1638 and 49 inclusive, the Covenants, National and Solemn League, Reformation Principles Exhibited, in agreeableness to the aforesaid Standards; together with the faithful contendings of our covenanted fathers: in a word—all the documents contemplated, regarded, and as engaged unto in the Terms of Ecclesiastical Communion in the Reformed Presbyterian Church.

In virtue of and in accordance with, the aforesaid principles and declarations, we unite and agree to continue a Presbytery.

Done in Allegheny Town,

June 27, 1840.

DAVID STEELE,
ROBERT LUSK,
WM. M'KINLEY,
WM. WYLIE,
NATHAN JOHNSTON.

On September 18, 1840, both he and Steele were stricken from the roll by the Ohio Presbytery, thus terminating his pastoral relationship with the Walnut Ridge congregation.

=== The freedom of ministry in the Reformed Presbytery ===
During the next five years, he ministered in and around the vicinity of Walnut Ridge to scattered adherents and participated in the courts of the Presbytery he helped erect.

==== Presbytery 1840 ====
Presbytery met and was constituted with prayer, on September 8, Brush Creek, Ohio. Presbytery resolved to appoint a committee to report on the "Deed of Constitution." David Steele and Matthew Mitchell, ruling elder, were appointed to that committee. Lusk was added by vote. Mr. Francis Gailey presented himself to the court as a representative of the "Safety League." His credentials were sustained by the court.

===== The "Safety League" =====
On the afternoon of September 9, a committee consisting of Steele, Lusk and Mitchell received two documents. The first was a letter from William Wylie explaining his inability to be in attendance as a representative. Wylie had been an elder in the Baltimore, Maryland congregation of the Reformed Presbyterian Church, a congregation Lusk had helped organize, in 1818. In 1837, he had been ordained and, earlier in the year, his support in erecting the Reformed Presbytery was manifest when his name appeared affixed to the "Deed of Constitution." His interest in being present was related to Mr. Francis Gailey. Since the resignation of the regular pastor, of the Baltimore congregation, in 1837, Gailey had often visited to preach. After Gailey had declined the authority of Synod, in 1838, many of the members of the congregation followed him and he continued to minister to them. Wylie's part in erecting the Presbytery was for a different end than the others, as began to appear in the second paper.

The second was a petition from the elders in the "Safety League." It was accompanied with documents and requested an ordination. Gailey was ministering as an unordained licentiate. As such, he was not supposed to administer sacraments. Those in the "Safety League" were eager to have that corrected. When the committee reported, September 10, they acknowledged the concerns expressed by the "Safety League" for a faithful testimony to be legitimate. Furthermore, they were aware of the great desire of the people in the Baltimore to have a regular minister. However, "judgment should not give place to feeling, so as in any measure to infringe upon presbyterial order." They went on to recommend "farther interchange of views with the petitioners." In short, they recommended patience.

===== The "Deed of Constitution" =====
On September 14, the committee for the "Deed of Constitution" reported. It began by chronicling the defections of the Reformed Presbyterian Church, since 1806, in matters of doctrine. First was the matter of the term "Testimony," it was not "identical in its import with its former ecclesiastical use." This led to a denial of the "historical" part as an article of faith (i.e., it was not a term of communion). From this error, the report asserts, came the "twofold view" taken of "occasional hearing" and "serving on juries." It traces these effects through Synods of the Church, pointing out how this diversity had tainted the courts and, finally, made it impossible for the Church to address the issue of "voluntary associations."

In matters of worship, the report attacks two innovations in the practice of the Church. First, introducing devotional exercises into the meetings of Synod. The second, condemned the growing practice of "continuous singing" in both congregations and judicatories of the Church. Psalm singing in Synod was an innovation. To this innovation they added the second.

In matters of government, the report raises the "deacon question." Additionally, it points to the presbyterial problems incurred by the action of 1840 dissolving Subordinate Synods and abolishing the delegate system without the consent of Presbyteries.

In matters of discipline, the mishandling of several cases, including that of Lusk and Gailey, are held out.

The report is signed by Steele, as chairman. Nonetheless, many of the details from Synod, prior to 1830, and the majority of the issues addressed, indicate that Lusk was heavily involved in supplying matter for the report.

On September 16, the court again considered the report and amended it paragraph by paragraph. Each review brought more amendments. Each amendment implied a desire on the part of the Presbytery to correct the errors of the past and act more faithfully in the future. Lusk, the precise ecclesiastic and the strict disciplinarian, found the new Presbytery a rarefied atmosphere in which to exercise his office.

==== Presbytery 1841 ====
Presbytery met next, according to adjournment, in Massie's Creek, Greene County, Ohio, on June 2. At this meeting Lusk was appointed moderator, a position he would occupy often for his last few years.

===== Ecclesiastical relations considered =====
At this meeting, Lusk and ruling elders Nathan Johnston and Thomas Steele were appointed to form a committee to report on "our ecclesiastical relations." On June 3, the initial report was read and commented upon. On June 4, the amended report was adopted. It offers some introductory remarks regarding the Church. She should be "distinct from all other communities in organization." It proceeds to acknowledge the presence of hypocrites in the true Church and their deleterious effect upon her organization. Then follows the first rule for recognizing enemies within the Church. "Opposition in profession, to any part of revealed truth is evidence of the ascendency of the carnal heat; and the relinquishment of acknowledged doctrine carries with it additional guilt, being a violation of voluntary engagements; and obstinacy in such defection must eventuate in the reprobation of the community." Enemies from within could prevail over a particular community and claim to be an organization of the Church. In such cases, love of truth must move the sincere believer to "reprobate" that community.

Next, follows a survey of the existing conditions of the Reformed Presbyterian Church in America, Scotland and Ireland. Each is subjected to scrutiny based on opposition to and relinquishing of the truth. The report concludes by denying the possibility of maintaining "communion judicially, ministerially, or in the dispensation of word and sacraments, with any of the aforesaid communities." Lusk, as chairman, signed the report. The cause of division must first be removed. There would be no "occasional communion" with those who evidence they hold another faith.

===== Doctrinal queries reviewed and resolved =====
After the resolution of the matter of ecclesiastical relations, and a short recess, the court took up some doctrinal questions, all related. Another committee was formed. This committee consisted of Lusk, David Steele, and Thomas Steele. Again, Lusk was appointed as chairman. The questions were moved by elder Nathan Johnston. They all revolved around the relation of fear, especially of hell, to believers. When Presbytery met the following evening, June 7, the matter was resolved. Among other observations, the committee stated, "'fear of hell' is 'inconsistent with saving faith.'" In other words, fear is in opposition to faith; and, therefore, "fear of hell," which considers God, "in his judicial character," can never provide a gospel "motive to obedience." The Presbytery was strict in matters of discipline, but it maintained its theological Calvinism. All obedience, even the highest Presbytery or Scripture could require, could only be yielded by the grace of God.

==== Presbytery 1842 ====
The time intervening had seen the rift with the "Safety League" widen. Elder William Wylie made no more pretensions to belong to the Presbytery and members of the Presbytery had written of concerns with the organization. There were others seeking the Presbytery's help and they would receive attention.

===== April, 1842, and the petition to organize a congregation =====
When Presbytery met, on April 11, 1842, in Brush Creek, Ohio, Lusk was continued as moderator.

A petition was presented from William Thompson and others, Mercer County, Pennsylvania. In it, they express grief that "a majority" of the members of the "Reformed Presbyterian Covenanted Church" had made defection from the truth and abandoned covenanted attainments, as well as changing the "terms of communion." They were seeking ministry and hoped to be organized into a congregation. A committee, composed of Lusk, Nathan Johnston and Matthew Mitchell, was appointed to report on the petition. On motion, a committee was then appointed to report on the "terms of Ecclesiastical communion adopted by the Reformed Presbytery in the United States in 1807." As moderator, Lusk appointed David Steele, Nathan Johnston, and William McKinley.

After deliberation, the following day, April 12, the committee chaired by Lusk to report on the petition of Thompson et al. recommended "a minister and ruling elder be appointed to repair to these people." Presbytery would proceed with an optimistic caution.

===== October, 1842, and the report on holding court in Mercer =====
Presbytery met again in the Fall. This time in Massie's Creek. Again, Lusk was continued as moderator when Presbytery was constituted by prayer, on October 5. The committee assigned to report on the petition from Mercer County, Pennsylvania reported that they had met in the town of Mercer, on May 19, 1842. Whilst there, Lusk and one of the ruling elders had constituted a session. Then, they began to review those applying for membership. Some were received without much controversy; others came under the shadow of ecclesiastical censure. They proceeded to hold court and re-examine evidence and, sometimes, witnesses. They report reversing the censures imposed by other communities and admitting into fellowship several who were deemed wrongfully charged. Lusk, who thought he understood being charged for "being faithful," was setting about to right the wrongs he believed church courts had inflicted. The Presbytery was fulfilling its purpose.

==== Presbytery 1843 ====
===== History as a term of communion =====
On October 9, 1843, the Presbytery met in Greenfield, Harrison County, Ohio. Lusk was continued moderator. The first paper that came before the Presbytery was a "petition and memorial." It was submitted on behalf of the Miami, Logan County, Ohio, session and congregation. It sought to have the term "Testimony" "restored to its former use in the church." That was intended, among other uses, to facilitate "renewal of the covenants as soon as practicable." It was given to a committee and Lusk was appointed chairman. On the morning of October 10, the committee, with Lusk as chair, reported. After rehearsing the nature of the problem, the committee resolved, "That the term testimony, as limited in the preface to R[eformation] P[rinciples] Exhibited, be restored to its former use." Lusk asserted in the report, that by restoring its use, the "distinctive practical traits of the church, as stated in the history,--such as occasional hearing, serving on juries, although doctrines, are thereby rendered void in their application," if the Testimony of the church fails to encompass its historical application. Restoring the term testimony required restoring history as a term of communion.

===== Not lording over the LORD's people =====
Afterward, the "Overture" terms of communion, were brought forward. Because any change in terms of communion would affect everyone in communion with the Presbytery, they had to be finalized and submitted to every congregation for approval. Thus, it was merely "Overture" terms. On motion, the document containing them was referred to a committee. Lusk was chairman of this committee, too. When they reported, later that same afternoon, they began by acknowledging the voice of the people under their care with regard to the matter. They begin, "Inasmuch as some of our people have expressed a desire that the terms should remain numerically the same as heretofore; this can be easily effected," etc. There would remain six terms of communion. Mindful of the problems created in the past by trying to impose changes without the consent of the people, the Reformed Presbytery sought to avoid that mistake. Certainly, Lusk's long experience had made him cautious in legislating.

==== Presbytery 1844 ====
During Lusk's life, 1844 would be the most active year for Presbytery. There was much work to accomplish restoring the Reformed Presbytery to its original basis.

===== May, 1844, and "historical testimony" =====
The first meeting of Presbytery, in 1844, was in Brush Creek, Ohio, May 6. Lusk was, again, continued as moderator. The papers being read, Lusk, and ruling elders, Thomas Ralston and Thomas Steele were appointed to a committee to report on the first paper. It was a request that Presbytery formally acknowledge the "Historical part of the Testimony." It was signed by Thomas Ralston and James Williams, Sr., elders at Brush Creek.

On May 7, Presbytery met and constituted by prayer in the Associate Reformed Presbyterian meeting house, at Georgescreek. The committee on paper No. 1 reported. The committee warned about the effects "from innovations made on former habits of thought and of action." This is especially true when it "affects the thoughts and the actions of the witnesses of Christ." How can the faithful remain faithful in the face of these changing habits? They point to the fact that "the testimony of the Church of Christ has embraced declaration of doctrine, argument and history, each in its kind." Embodying this testimony, the Church has been "a witnessing community, and her children,--Witnesses." Reformation Principles Exhibited had "despoiled" the "testamentary character" of "history and argument." Consequently, the committee asserted, "from habit of thought and of practice, individual opinion in the community, was directly opposed to their public profession." Therefore, they conclude, "the historical part of the book" [i.e., Reformation Principles Exhibited] be formally approved, and "be recognized in the formula of the terms of communion." The Presbytery was approving the "Historical part," but "only so far as it accorded with other standards of the church." This qualified approval would fade, as Presbytery discovered more and more conflicts between Reformation Principles Exhibited, in America, in 1806, and the Act, Declaration and Testimony, emitted in North Britain, in 1761. For Lusk, the original Covenanters were to be preferred. The old paths were safer.

On the last day of Presbytery, May 8, Lusk was appointed with John French, a ruling elder, to prepare causes of fasting and thanksgiving for the next meeting. They had many causes to fast, but the causes for thanksgiving were, from their perspective, increasing with each meeting of Presbytery.

===== October, 1844, and observing the times =====
When Presbytery met, October 23, in Logan County, Ohio, Lusk was continued as moderator. This time a reason was assigned. David Steele was indisposed. He was present, but unable to moderate the meeting. The morning of the following day, October 24, Lusk's committee on causes of fasting and thanksgiving was called to report. In began with the solemn reminder that everyone "should constantly bear in mind his accountability for the deeds done in the body; that after death the judgment." The actions of men carry eternal consequences. More to the point, "from the concurrence of prophecy and providential developments, in the times wherein we live," it had become apparent that comparatively few "of the professors of religion, are redeemed from the earth of anti-christianism." Then, there follows an enumeration of the sins of the day. However, there were also causes for rendering thanksgiving to God. God's judgments are being poured out and the hope is expressed that the "period of Zion's sojourning in the wilderness" is drawing closer to its end. Hopeful signs are indicated. Lusk, as the chairman of that committee, had provided a voice for Presbytery. The duty of original Covenanters was to tremble at the thought and sight of sinful defections and backslidings; but, also, to rejoice in confidence that God's time would come. "When the LORD shall build up Zion, he shall appear in his glory." Ps. 102:16. Their duty was to keep the testimony, to this, they believed, was a great and eternal promise annexed.

The last matter of business for Presbytery was to appoint Lusk to moderate in a call, in the Miami congregation. He was also requested to administer the Lord's supper "in the same." The court, then, on motion, adjourned, with the plan to meet within the bounds of the Miami congregation, merely ten days later.

===== November, 1844, and a ministerial call for Lusk =====
Presbytery met and was constituted by prayer, the afternoon of November 4, in Richland, Logan County, Ohio. Lusk was continued as moderator. At this meeting, Lusk laid before the court a call, "duly attested, as having been moderated by him, in the Miami congregation." After examination, the court presented it to Lusk, "for acceptance or rejection." The call had been unanimous and Lusk signified his intent to accept. Lusk, however, noted that his acceptance was contingent upon his being able "to make domestic arrangements" which would enable "him to fix his residence in the congregation." Until these arrangements could be made, he requested the call remain in the hands of the Presbytery. They were to take it up, at their next meeting. Obviously, Lusk had to set his estate in order for a relocation.

==== Presbytery 1845 ====
Lusk was continued moderator at the last meeting of Presbytery he would attend. On June 2, at the Brush Creek meeting house, Presbytery met according to adjournment and was constituted by prayer. On June 3, David Steele assumed the moderator's chair. The business before the court centered on the increasing concern about the "sentiments in the American Testimony [i.e., Reformation Principles Exhibited] contrary to other standards of the church." On June 4, the session was spent dissecting the "American Testimony." The exercise ended emphaszing "that the application of the doctrines of the church is still binding." Furthermore, they declare, "That no member of the church, without contracting guilt, in the present state of society, can take the oath of allegiance to the government of these United States, hold office, exercise the elective franchise, act as a juror, or hold communion in other bodies, by what is commonly styled "occasional hearing." Presbytery did not intend to allow their indecision with respect to the "American Testimony" to allow a relaxing of the original Covenanter testimony. Lusk would participate in no repeat of the confusion wrought by the Synod of 1821 in their handling of the "jury act."

The last item Presbytery addressed was the call from the Miami congregation. As there was "no representation" from their congregation, it was ordered the call be continued on Presbytery's table. They adjourned with the plan to meet at Xenia, Ohio, the last Monday of May, 1846. They intended to take up the matter of Lusk's call then, but Lusk would not be there and the call would be mooted.

=== Death and legacy ===
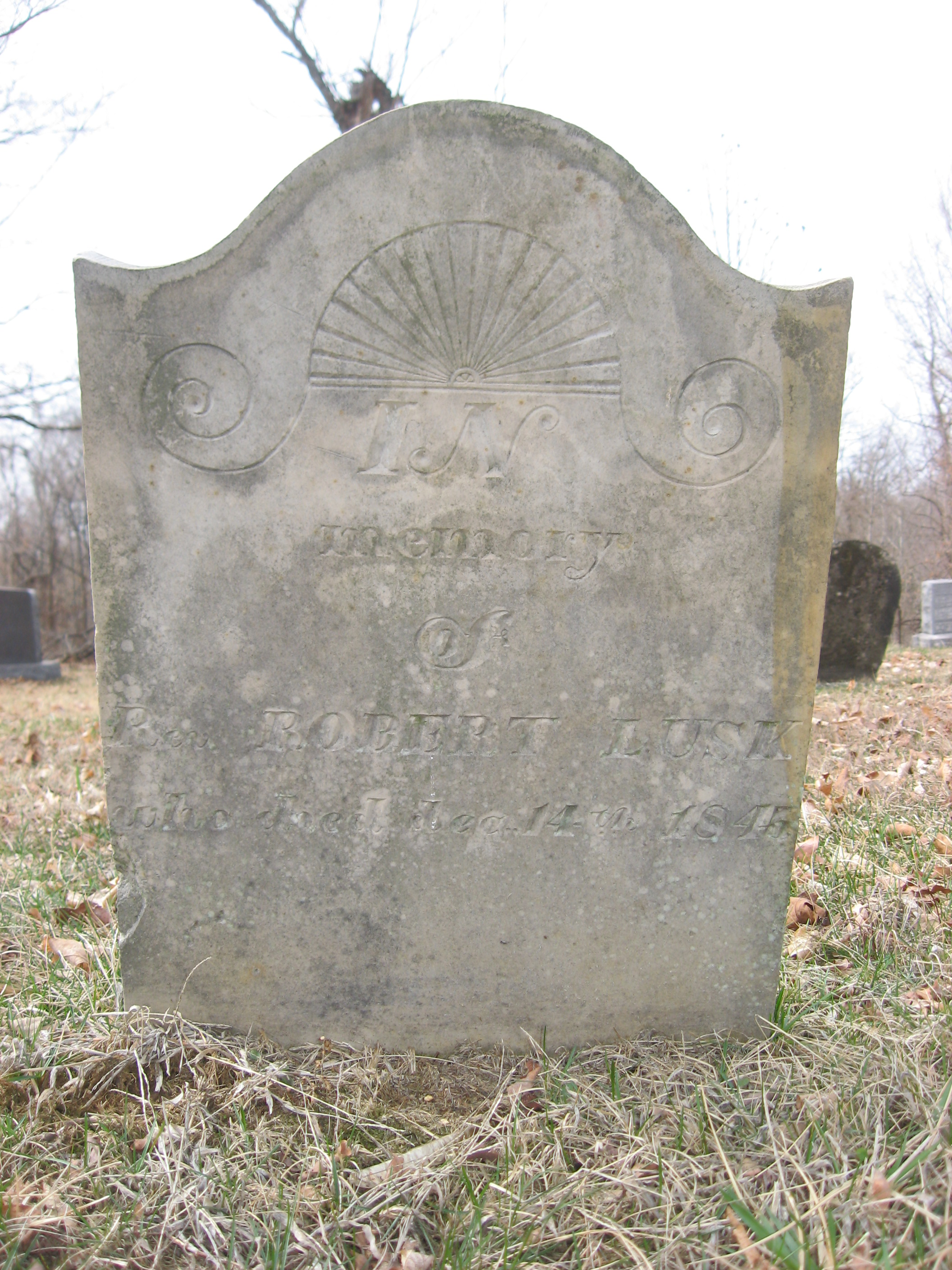
Lusk's gravestone at Walnut Ridge

Lusk's death came somewhat unexpectedly, on December 14, 1845, of erysipelas, more commonly called "holy fire." He was 64 years of age. It was rendered all the more unexpected because, as David Steele recalled, "It was observed by his friends at the meeting of Presbytery last June, that he appeared to be in the enjoyment of better health than usual." He left behind his second wife, Mary, and numerous offspring.

His death dissolved the Reformed Presbytery until 1854.

During his last five years, in connection with the Reformed Presbytery, as Steele recalled, "he was instrumental in framing the counsels and measures adopted." It has been said that he was not considered a pleasing speaker, yet he was acknowledged to be an instructive preacher and gifted in prayer. His pulpit mannerisms were noted for being peculiarly his own. Steele later noted, "We have many a time heard from him expositions of obscure portions of the Bible, which carried their own evidence, although in opposition to the whole current of commentators."

Years later, Steele reminisced about the "many expressions of compassion" he received for being "misled by Lusk." Although this group would later be denominated "Steelites" (likely due to the longevity of the junior member of Presbytery), at the time of their inception they were nearly designated as "Luskites." One anonymous contributor to the Reformed Presbyterian magazine wondered if the "new system shall not be known hereafter by the name of Luskism."

== Publications ==
His publications, though few, were marked by a careful and scholarly attention to sacred prophecy and its connection with the events of Divine Providence. In 1843, he published "Characteristics of the Witnessing Church," and "Characteristics of Surrounding Communities," in the Contending Witness, a magazine edited for the Presbytery by David Steele. He also published An Abstract of Grievances, &c., published in New York, in 1825, likely immediately after his "declinature" and may be the "communications" he said he had to make, when departing Synod, the morning of August 9, 1825. There was also printed, sometime around 1825, in Salem, Indiana, a publication entitled, Lusk's Prospectus, which also has bearing on his early clashes with Synod.
