= David Steele (minister) =

American Reformed Presbyterian Minister 1830–1887

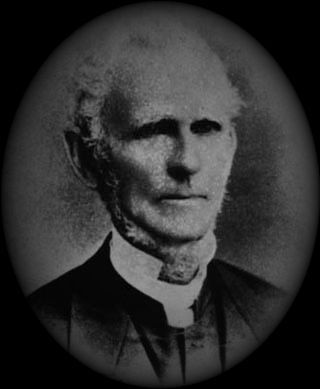
Rev. David Steele, Sr.

David Steele, Sr. (2 November 1803 – 29 June 1887) was a Reformed Presbyterian or Covenanter minister.

== Early life ==
He was born in Upper Creevagh, County Donegal, Ireland to David Steel and Sarah Gailey. His father was a fourth-generation descendant of Capt. John Steel of Lesmahagow, Lanarkshire, Scotland, a local leader in the Covenanter uprising of 1679. His grandparents, on both sides of the family, were Covenanters. His paternal grandfather, John Steel, had resided in Fanet. He moved to Creevaugh sometime prior to the birth of his grandson. His maternal grandfather, Andrew Gailey, resided in Killylastin. His father died when he was an infant, in February, 1805. According to Steele, his only recollection of his father was conducting family worship. Next to the Bible, Steele claimed the greatest impression made on him, in his youth, was Thomas Boston's Four-fold State of Man and A Cloud of witnesses for the royal prerogatives of Jesus Christ. The latter work is an account, published in 1714, of the Scottish martyrs who perished during the persecutions, known as the Killing Times, during the reigns of Charles II and James VII. In his seventeenth year [1820], he entered the Academy in Derry, where he pursued his studies for three years, including the study of languages.

== Emigration to America ==
In 1824 he emigrated to the United States. He settled in Huntingdon, Pennsylvania, where he worked, for a time, in his uncle's store, while he pursued classical studies. In the spring of 1825, he was retained to teach at the Academy of Ebensburgh. The following year he entered the Western University of Pennsylvania, from which he graduated, in 1827. After this, he began a course of studies in theology under the direction of the Rev. Dr. John Black, at Pittsburgh. In 1830, on April 8, he was licensed by the Pittsburgh Presbytery of the Reformed Presbyterian Church. On May 4, 1831, he married Eliza Johnston, of Chillicothe, Ross County, Ohio. He accepted the unanimous call to serve as pastor of the Reformed Presbyterian congregation in Brush Creek, Adams County, Ohio. On 6 June 1831, he was ordained and installed, as the third pastor, by two brothers, members of the Ohio Presbytery, Rev. Gavin and Rev. Hugh McMillan. During this time, he had several preaching assignments, one being in Mill Creek, Kentucky. When the Reformed Presbyterian Church split into "Old Lights" and "New Lights," in 1833, Steele and his Brush Creek congregation remained in ecclesiastical connection with the "Old Lights" party. He was appointed Clerk of Synod in 1833 and, in 1838, he was assistant clerk.

== After the Old/New Lights split ==
After the split, in 1833, Steele expressed hope that the "Old Lights" would revive the law of the Church concerning "occasional hearing" and tighten the prohibition on "voluntary associations." With the re-admission of the Rev. Robert Lusk, in 1834, he found a kindred spirit.

These two ministers spent the next six years witnessing and challenging a return to the original Act, Declaration and Testimony (1761) of the Scottish Covenanters, together with a restoration of history to its proper place in that Testimony. In 1838, he went together with a few others to attend the death bed of the Rev. William Gibson, the last surviving minister who had participated in re-erecting the Reformed Presbytery in 1798. Gibson left his dying testimony against the practice of "voluntary associations." This served to confirm Steele and his stricter Covenanting brethren in their course of pressing the matter in Synod. In 1840, Steele, on behalf of a number of his brethren, presented a paper (#30) to Synod petitioning for redress on the matter of "voluntary associations." This paper was set aside for later consideration at a future meeting of Synod. This was, for Steele and Lusk, the final straw.

Synod adjourned on June 26, 1840, and the following day, he protested and separated from the Reformed Presbyterian Church of North America, along with fellow minister Robert Lusk and elders William McKinley, William Wylie and Nathan Johnston, on the grounds that the RPCNA had "corrupted the doctrines and worship, and prostituted the government and discipline of the house of God"..

== Establishing the Reformed Presbytery ==
They constituted themselves as the Reformed Presbytery and set about to return the "old paths." He remained in Adams County, Ohio, until 1859, ministering to adherents in that area. At that time, he removed to Hill Prairie, near Sparta, Illinois and served adherents of Presbytery in that vicinity. In October, 1866, he moved to Philadelphia, Pennsylvania. In Philadelphia, he pastored a small congregation and established a small theological school. In 1885, he moved for a brief period of time to Galesburg, Illinois.

== Return to Philadelphia and death ==
However, in the fall of 1886, he returned to Philadelphia. It was there he died of old age and from the effects of a slight stroke of paralysis, Wednesday, June 29, 1887. His death was announced in the Public Ledger of Philadelphia on June 30. "STEELE. – On the 29th inst., Rev. DAVID STEELE, Sr., D.D., in the 84th year of his age. The remains may be viewed by relatives and friends, on Friday evening, July 1, from 6 until 8 o'clock, at 2732 Brown Street. Interment in Petersburgh, Pa., on Saturday morning, July 2, 1887." Though he was never known to use the title of "D.D." during his life, it was a degree granted him, in 1884, by the Western University of Pennsylvania. His epitaph reads, "I have kept the faith."

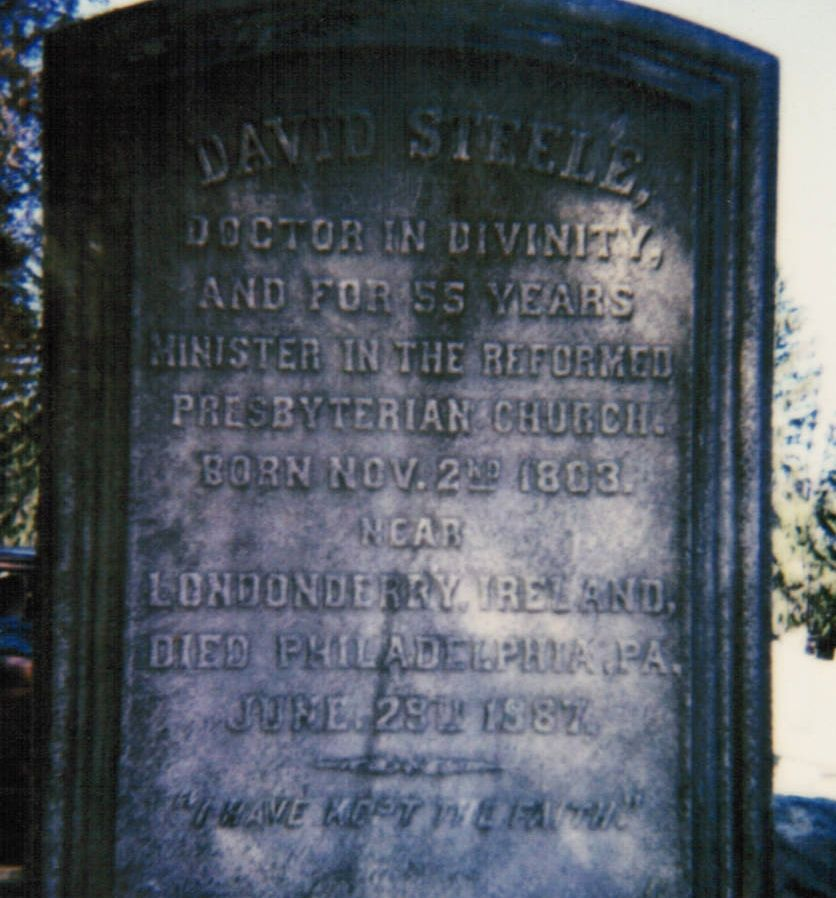
Grave of David Steele, Sr. Huntingdon, Pennsylvania

== Legacy ==
Although he lived in the United States for sixty years, Steele never became an American citizen, believing that the U.S. Constitution sanctioned "atheism and slavery." Steele died in June 1887, and with him died his small denomination. The Reformed Presbytery failed to produce another minister other than Lusk and Steele, and with the death of the two founders, the "presbytery" ceased to be. His church survives tenuously, without ordained ministers, as the Reformed Presbyterian Church (Covenanted) also known as the "Steelites." The term is also used to describe other secessions from the RPCNA and other bodies that also claim inspiration from Steele, including the Reformed Presbytery in North America (General Meeting) and the Covenanted Reformed Presbyterian Church.
