= Reformed Presbyterian Church of North America =

Presbyterian church with locations in the United States, Canada, and Japan

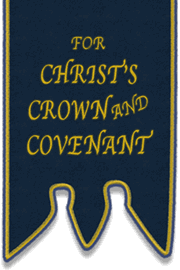
- The "Blue Banner"
- Classification: Protestant
- Theology: Reformed
- Governance: Presbyterian
- Region: North America, Japan
- Separations: majority merged into Associate Reformed Presbyterian Church (1782); Reformed Presbyterian Church, General Synod (1833); Reformed Presbytery (1840); ~11% merged into the United Presbyterian Church of North America (1891)
- Congregations: 100 (As of 2016)
- Members: 7,076 (As of 2016)
- Ministers: 151
- Missionaries: 6
- Tertiary institutions: 2
- Official website: https://reformedpresbyterian.org/

The Reformed Presbyterian Church of North America (RPCNA) is a Presbyterian church with congregations and missions throughout the United States, Japan, and Chile. Its beliefs—held in common with other members of the Reformed Presbyterian Global Alliance—place it in the conservative wing of the Reformed family of Protestant churches. Below the Bible—which is held as divinely inspired and without error—the church is committed to several "subordinate standards", together considered with its constitution: the Westminster Confession of Faith and Larger and Shorter Catechisms, along with its Testimony, Directory for Church Government, the Book of Discipline, and Directory for Worship.

Primary doctrinal distinctions which separate the RPCNA from other Reformed and Presbyterian denominations in North America are: its continued adherence to the historical practice of Reformed Christianity, contained in the Westminster Confession of Faith, of practicing exclusive psalmody, and its continuing affirmation of Jesus as mediatorial king, ruling over all nations. Prior to the 1960s, the RPCNA refused to vote in elections or participate in government in the United States due to it not directly acknowledging Christ's authority over it, and since has continued (at some times more heavily than others), to lobby the federal government to expressly submit to the authority of Jesus Christ in the United States Constitution.

The RPCNA has a long history, having been a separate denomination in the United States since the Colonial era. In Scotland, where the denomination originated, Reformed Presbyterians have been a separate branch since the late 17th century, and prior to that, a part of the original Presbyterian Church of Scotland that came out of the Protestant Reformation in the 16th century.

As its name suggests, the RPCNA is presbyterian in polity, with each individual congregation being governed by two or more elders. The church considers this to be the only divinely-appointed method of church government. As with most Presbyterian denominations, the RPCNA is divided into several presbyteries, but unlike several other smaller Presbyterian denominations, the supreme governing body is a single synod, not a general assembly. Each congregation may send one ruling elder delegate (two for larger congregations) to its presbytery meeting, as well as to the annual Synod meeting. Each minister (teaching elder), whether serving as the pastor of a congregation or not, is automatically a delegate to his presbytery and to the synod.

== Terminology ==
The following terminology is derived from the Directory for Church Government in the RPCNA's church constitution:

- Baptized member: a member, almost always the child of communicant members, who has been baptized but has not yet professed Christian faith. Baptized members may not receive the Lord's Supper or vote in congregational business meetings.
- Communicant member: a member who has professed Christian faith and adherence to church standards. Communicant members may receive the Lord's Supper and vote in congregational business meetings.
- Elder: a man elected and ordained to lead a congregation. This includes both ruling elders (laymen) and teaching elders (clergy), which are considered equal in status but different in role. Under normal circumstances, each ruling elder is a member of his congregation's session, as is every active pastor. However, an ordained minister who is not currently active as a pastor may serve only as a ruling elder in his congregation. Each congregation must have at least two elders in order to be legitimately constituted.
- Presbytery: a group of several congregations in a specific area, governed by the ministers in that area along with one or more ruling elders from each of those several congregations.
- Session: a governing board in each congregation, composed of the ruling elders in that congregation and the congregation's pastor(s).
- Synod: a governing body above the presbytery, composed of all ministers and one or more ruling elders from each congregation in the denomination.

== History ==
The RPCNA, like the other churches of the Reformed Presbyterian Global Alliance, descends from the Reformed Presbyterian Church of Scotland, which formed in 1690. From the time of the Revolution Settlement in 1691, the foremost of Reformed Presbyterian "distinctive principles" was the practice of political dissent from the British government.

The first Reformed Presbyterian congregation in North America was organized in Middle Octorara (Lancaster County, Pennsylvania) in 1738, but the first presbytery, organized by four immigrant Irish and Scottish Reformed Presbyterian ministers, was not formed until 1774. At this time, Reformed Presbyterians were mostly concentrated in eastern Pennsylvania and northern South Carolina, but small groups of Reformed Presbyterians existed in Massachusetts, Connecticut, New York, western Pennsylvania, North Carolina, and Georgia. During the American Revolution, most Reformed Presbyterians fought for independence—the one minister who served in South Carolina was even arrested for insurrection and brought before Lord Cornwallis in 1780.

After the ratification of the United States Constitution in 1788, the denomination held the document (and therefore all governments under it) to be immoral, and participation in such a government to be likewise immoral, because the constitution contained no recognition of Christ as the King of Nations. Therefore, the RPCNA eschewed various civic rights, such as voting and jury service, and church courts disciplined members who exercised them. As few Americans held such principles, and as obedience sometimes caused difficulty (for example, oaths of allegiance were prohibited, preventing foreign-born Reformed Presbyterians from becoming citizens, and preventing Reformed Presbyterians to make use of the Homestead Act), many Reformed Presbyterians began to differ with the denomination's official position. Between 1774 and 1891, the denomination experienced four schisms, three of them involving members who deemed the denomination's position too strict.

- In 1782, almost all of the church merged with the Associate Presbyterian Church (the Seceders) to form the Associate Reformed Presbyterian Church, holding that the new situation of independence removed the reasons for political dissent. The few remaining members who refused to join the merger, including just two congregations, were reorganized into a presbytery in 1798.
- In 1833, the church split down the middle, forming the New Light and Old Light RP Synods. The New Lights, who formed the Reformed Presbyterian Church, General Synod and exercised political rights, grew for some years but suffered splits and went into decline, eventually merging in 1965 with the Evangelical Presbyterian Church (formerly the Bible Presbyterian Church-Columbus Synod) to form the Reformed Presbyterian Church, Evangelical Synod, which in 1982 merged with the Presbyterian Church in America.
- A third split, in 1840, resulted in two ministers and a few elders leaving to form the Reformed Presbytery (nicknamed the Steelites, after David Steele, their most prominent leader), which continues today. Unlike with the other splits, this was occasioned by the departed ministers and members holding that the denomination itself had fallen away from its covenants and "historical attainments" by allowing "occasional hearing", political activity, and membership in "voluntary associations".
- The main body of the RPCNA suffered another split, the "East End Split", in 1891, again on the matter of political activity and office-holding. Statistics reveal that denominational membership suffered a net loss of 11% in 1891, most of whom joined the United Presbyterian Church.

Despite such disagreements, the denomination held to its doctrines with few changes. Holding to the principle that covenants should continue to be updated and sworn, the RPCNA adopted the "Covenant of 1871" as their new church covenant in that year. Some members saw certain aspects of this covenant as major departures from historic Reformed Presbyterian positions, causing some to leave and join the Reformed Presbytery.

Perhaps the most enduring change during the 19th century involved participation in social reform movements. One cause favored by the denomination was the abolition of slavery, beginning officially in 1800, when members were prohibited from slave owning and from the slave trade. Enthusiastically supported by most members, the denomination took a strong stance against the Confederacy and faithfully supported the North in the Civil War, as Reformed Presbyterians enlisted to fight against the "slaveholders' rebellion". Abolition was a major factor in the decline of the denomination's South Carolina and Tennessee congregations: most members there, finding it hard to be abolitionists in slave-owning societies, moved to southern Ohio, Indiana, and Illinois; by the beginning of the Civil War, all of the old congregations in South Carolina and Tennessee were gone. The only congregations remaining in slave-holding territory were in Baltimore, Maryland, and in Roney's Point, Virginia (now West Virginia), near Wheeling. Another area of social activism focused on alcohol and tobacco. While drunkenness had always been prohibited, members were prohibited from the alcohol business in 1841, and by the 1880s, both church officers and ordinary members were prohibited from alcohol use. By 1886, tobacco use was strongly condemned as well, with ordination being prohibited to anyone who used it. As a result, the denomination explicitly supported the Eighteenth Amendment and other prohibition efforts for many decades.

Immigration from Reformed Presbyterian churches in Ireland and Scotland provided sustained growth for the denomination. Some congregations, especially those on the East Coast, saw rapid growth; over ninety members, many of them immigrants, joined the Baltimore, Maryland, congregation in a single three-year period. Meanwhile, members moved west and many congregations were organized. In 1840, there were four East Coast city congregations and zero congregations west of the Mississippi River, the farthest west congregation being in southwestern Illinois. In 1865, there were nine East Coast city congregations and eight congregations west of the Mississippi, as far west as southwestern Iowa. In 1890, there were twelve East Coast city congregations and thirty-five congregations west of the Mississippi, as far west as Seattle, Washington. More presbyteries were organized as well: in 1840, there were 5; in 1850, 5; in 1860, 6; in 1870, 8; in 1880, 10; in 1890, 11.

During the middle decades of the 19th century, the denomination experienced widespread growth. Many congregations in the East were organized in cities, while many others were countryside congregations. Farther west, however, most congregations were founded in the countryside. This is due in large part to the way of life of many Reformed Presbyterian settlers. Typically, a large group of settlers would gather and move to an area favorable for farming, where a congregation would soon be organized for them. Some congregations saw extremely fast growth in this way: the North Cedar (Denison, Kansas) congregation did not exist in 1870 but had eighty-four members in 1872. Other growth came from different sources. Although American congregations had been governed by an American church since 1798, the Scottish and Irish synods continued to operate missions in Canada. Over the years, several Scottish-synod congregations joined the North American synod, and with the blessing of the Irish synod, an entire presbytery ("New Brunswick and Nova Scotia") transferred in 1879. Few complete congregations have joined the RPCNA over the years, other than these, although the denomination has seen one merger: in 1969, the RPCNA merged with the remnants of the Associate Presbyterian Church, which by this point consisted of just four churches.

After sixty years of nearly constant growth, the denominational split in 1891 led to a denomination-wide downturn. Although the departure of twelve hundred members in the split still left over ten thousand communicant members, nearly constant loss led to a total of just 3,804 communicant members by 1980. During this time, the large congregations in the big cities of the East gradually withered: while in 1891, there were two congregations in Boston, Massachusetts, five in New York City, three in Philadelphia, Pennsylvania, and one in Baltimore, in 1980 there were only four in Boston, New York, and Philadelphia combined. Settlement and growth in the western United States continued for a time, with new presbyteries being organized in Colorado, the Pacific Coast, and the Prairie Provinces of Canada. However, the countryside congregations also dwindled, from 83 in 1891 to 25 in 1980. Presbyteries, too, were disorganized and combined, with only seven presbyteries remaining in 1980. Perhaps the most drastic examples of both congregational and presbyterial decline involve New York: by 1980, four presbyteries (Philadelphia, New York, Vermont, and New Brunswick and Nova Scotia) had been combined into the New York Presbytery (since renamed Atlantic), while five New York City congregations with 1,075 communicant members had been reduced to one congregation of only about forty people. Although large numbers of losses were due to individuals leaving for other churches, some departures involved many people at once. For example, over 100 communicant members left First Boston congregation when their pastor left the denomination in 1912, while Craftsbury, Vermont, and Second Newburg (Newburgh, New York) congregations left the denomination as entire congregations, in 1906 and 1919 respectively. After the mid-1910s, even the founding of new congregations was uncommon, with only three each in the 1920s and 1930s, and none at all between 1937 and 1950.

== Beliefs and practices ==
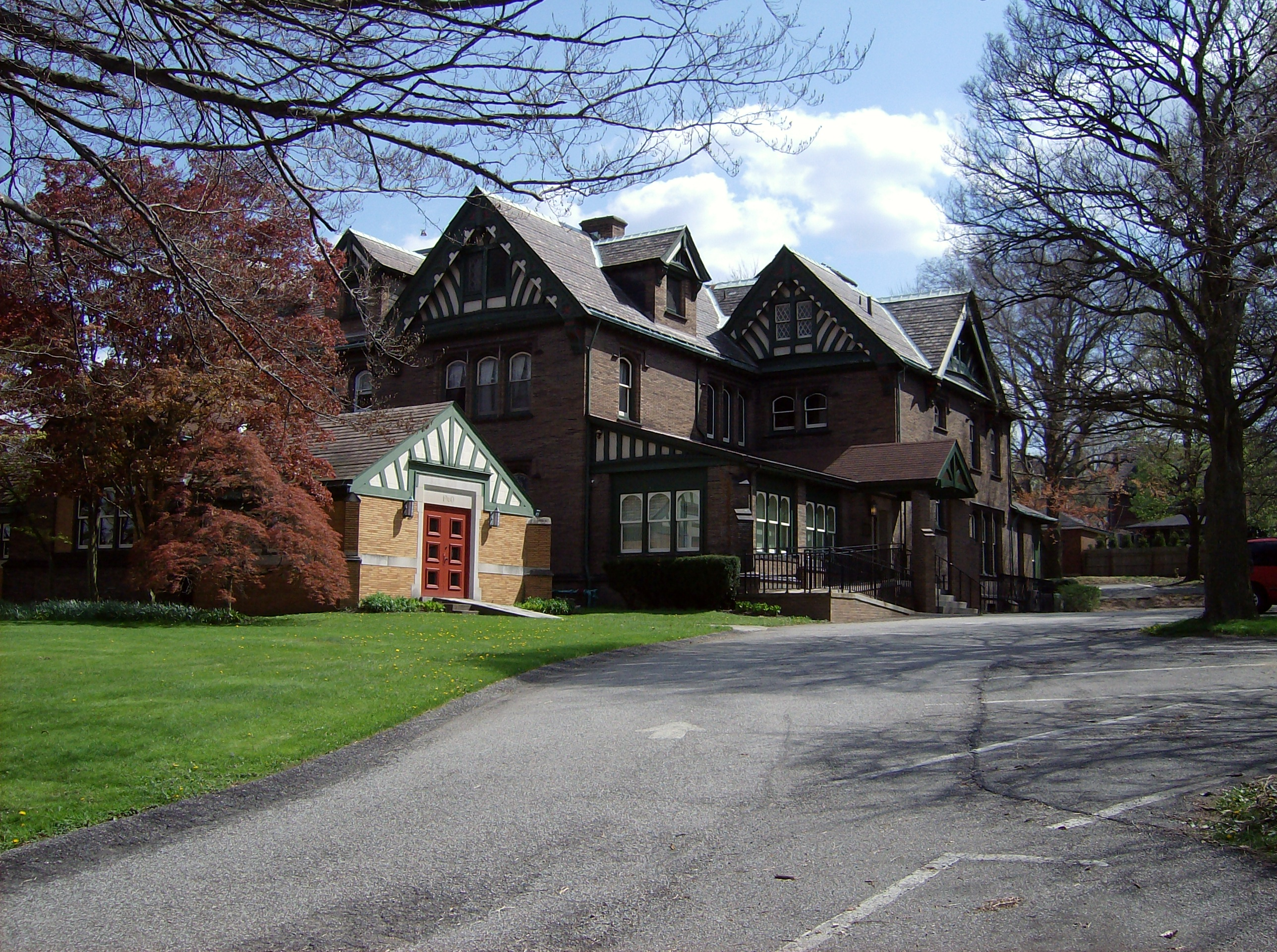
The Reformed Presbyterian Theological Seminary in Pittsburgh, Pennsylvania

The Reformed Presbyterian Church has held to the Westminster Confession of Faith and Catechisms since the 17th century. Instead of adopting revised versions of the Confession, as most other Westminsterian Presbyterian churches in North America have done, the RPCNA instead holds to the original Westminster Confession, but states a few objections in its official testimony, which it prints side-by-side with the Confession. Today, the RPCNA denied only three small portions of the original Confession, besides qualifying the Confession's naming of the Pope as Antichrist. In view of its confessional adherence, the RPCNA is doctrinally close to other Reformed denominations.

Historically, the "distinctive principles" of Reformed Presbyterians were political: they held to a continuing obligation of the Covenants, both National and Solemn League, upon all who had sworn them and upon all their descendants, and the belief that governmental rejection of such documents caused the government to become immoral or even undeserving of obedience. This led them to reject the government of Scotland after the Glorious Revolution, as well as those of Ireland and England, which had also acknowledged but later dropped the Covenants. Furthermore, as the American colonies had been under English jurisdiction at the time of the Solemn League, the United States was held as responsible to uphold the Covenants. Since the Constitution contains no reference to Christ or to the Covenants, Reformed Presbyterians refused to vote, hold governmental office, serve on juries, or swear any oath of loyalty to the United States government or any lower government; Canadian members similarly refrained from such activities. Members who did participate in the political process would typically be disciplined by their congregational session. Although the RPCNA held these principles firmly for many decades, it moderated its positions beginning in the 1960s; by 1969, the official position allowed members to vote and run for office. Some members yet continue the historic dissenting positions, but the majority of members participate like members of most other conservative Christian denominations, and Reformed Presbyterian Bob Lyon served in the Kansas Senate from 2001 to 2005.

Another long-held belief distinguishing the RPCNA from other churches was its prohibition of occasional hearing, the practice of attending worship services or preaching by ministers of other denominations. Although the practice is permitted today, it was long prohibited. For example, records from an eastern Pennsylvania congregation note that two women were "severely admonished" for attending a weekday Methodist camp-meeting in 1821. The grounds for this prohibition were historical: the Church of Scotland, of which the Reformed Presbyterian Church considered itself a continuation, had been established as the state church throughout Great Britain. As the Reformed Presbyterian Church believed that that state church had never officially been disestablished in a legal manner, it considered other churches to have no legal right to exist. Therefore, attending a worship service of any other church amounted to participation in an illegal organization.

In common with other churches in the Reformed Presbyterian lineage, the RPCNA holds to the Regulative Principle of Worship and construes it to require a cappella singing of the Psalms only in worship, as they believe it to be the only form of congregational singing evidenced in and thus permitted by the Bible. While this practice was not unusual in past centuries, many other denominations have permitted hymns and instrumental music over the years. As a result, the RPCNA's manner of worship is quite distinctive today, and with the change in the official position on political action, the manner of worship is the chief distinction of the RPCNA today.

Although alcohol use was prohibited for all members for many decades, in recent years both ordinary members and ordained officers have been permitted to use it. Chapter 26 of the RPCNA Testimony states that abstinence from alcohol is still a fitting choice for Christians.

Along with many other conservative denominations, the RPCNA interprets the Bible as requiring all elders to be male. Unlike most related denominations, however, deacons in the RPCNA may be either male or female; the first women deacons were ordained in 1888 (with attempts to limit the diaconate to men having failed as recently as 2002). In 1939, a committee of the Synod brought in a unanimous recommendation that women may be ordained as elders. The Synod did not adopt the committee recommendation.

The sacrament of the Lord's Supper, or Communion, is served to all communicant members present at a church celebrating the sacrament. Until recent decades, only Reformed Presbyterians were permitted to take the sacrament, but members of other denominations considered to be Bible-believing have been extended this privilege in recent decades. However, the RPCNA requires that members of other denominations who take communion be personally interviewed by the session before partaking, another practice that distinguishes the RPCNA from other Reformed denominations.

The Reformed Presbyterian Church in North America is also a member of the North American Presbyterian and Reformed Council (NAPARC), an organization of confessional Presbyterian and Continental Reformed churches, which also includes the Orthodox Presbyterian Church, the Presbyterian Church in America, the United Reformed Churches in North America, Reformed Church in the United States, and the Associate Reformed Presbyterian Church along with a few other smaller Reformed and Presbyterian denominations as members.

== Organization ==
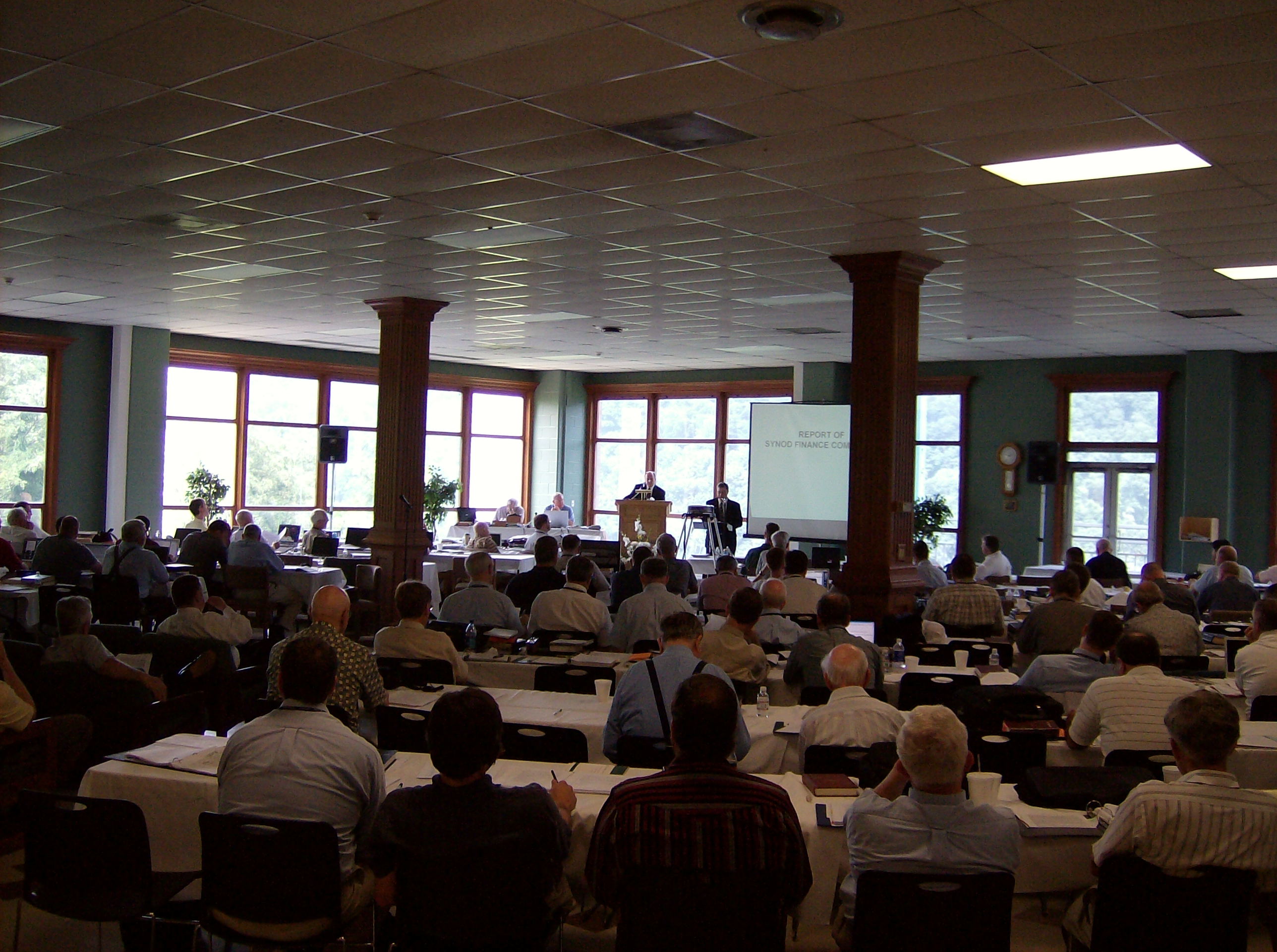
View of the Synod in 2007

Today, the RPCNA has congregations in twenty-eight U.S. states as well as maintaining close relations with "sister churches" of Reformed Presbyterians in Canada, South Sudan, Ireland, Scotland, and Australia. There is also a mission presbytery in Kobe, Japan, as well as an associated mission congregation in Larnaca, Cyprus.

The RPCNA is composed of the following presbyteries:

- Alleghenies: including congregations in Maryland, northeastern Ohio, western and central Pennsylvania, Virginia and North Carolina.
- Atlantic: including congregations in Massachusetts, New Jersey, southeastern New York, eastern Pennsylvania, and Rhode Island
- Great Lakes-Gulf: including congregations in Alabama, Florida, Georgia, Illinois, Indiana, Michigan, and western Ohio.
- Midwest: including congregations in Colorado, Iowa, Kansas, Missouri, Oklahoma, Texas, and Wyoming.
- Pacific Coast: including congregations in Arizona, California, Nevada, and Washington
- St. Lawrence: including congregations in upstate New York.
- Japan: including congregations in Kobe

=== Membership ===
Since 1980, the denomination has experienced growth, seeing an increase of approximately 25% in membership and 11% in the number of churches. This growth has not been uniform, however; many churches have been started in urban areas, while many older congregations, especially in rural areas, have continued to decline.

As of 31 December 2007, the RPCNA had 6,334 members in 75 North American congregations, along with 238 more members in four congregations in Japan. By 2016 communicant membership had risen to 7,076. The "stronghold" areas of the denomination are in northeastern Kansas, central Indiana, and western Pennsylvania. The denomination sponsors Geneva College in Beaver Falls, Pennsylvania (all members of the Board of Corporators are required to be Reformed Presbyterians), and operates the Reformed Presbyterian Theological Seminary in Pittsburgh, Pennsylvania. The denomination holds a week-long International Conference every four years; the most recent was held in June 2024 at Indiana Wesleyan University in Marion, Indiana. A denominational magazine, the Reformed Presbyterian Witness, is published monthly.

=== Missions ===
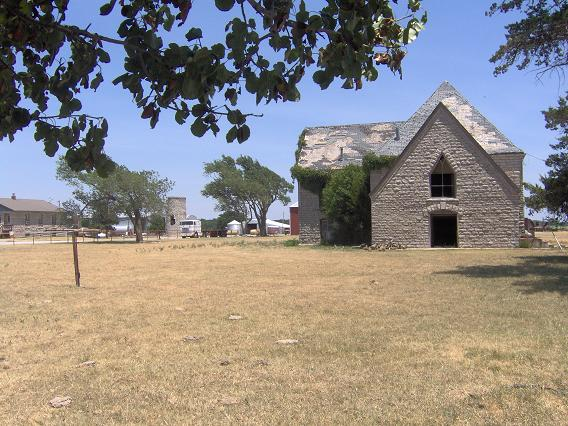
The former Indian Mission property in 2006

The RPCNA has sponsored missions in several different fields throughout the years. In North America, several different home missions were established among specific people:

- Jewish Missions were established by congregations in Philadelphia and Cincinnati.
- A Chinese Mission was run for a short time in Oakland, California.
- The Indian Mission, which worked primarily with members of the Comanche and Apache nations, was established in the countryside near Apache, Oklahoma, in 1889. A congregation that resulted from this mission existed until 1971.
- Several small Southern Missions were run throughout the South during and after the Civil War, mostly working with freed slaves. The last of these, established in Selma, Alabama in 1875, resulted in the establishment of a congregation still in existence.

Several other missions were organized for foreign work:

- In 1847, a missionary was sent out to begin work in Port-au-Prince, Haïti. This mission was ended abruptly within two years when the missionary joined the Seventh Day Baptist Church.
- Missionaries were first sent to Syria in 1856. After a short exploratory period, several mission stations were organized in Latakia and the surrounding area. This mission was continued until the late 1950s, when Syrian governmental policies forced the RPCNA to cut its ties with the churches there.
- Work was begun in the area around Mersin, in Asia Minor, around 1882 and continued until around 1932.
- In 1888, work was begun in Cyprus, and congregations were established in Larnaca and Nicosia. Mission work continued until the 1970s. Today, a single congregation in Larnaca is affiliated with the RPCNA and is pastored by an RPCNA missionary, but is not related to the previous mission.
- Missionaries were first sent to the town of Tak Hing, in South China, in 1895. This mission proved to be quite fruitful, resulting in over eight hundred members by the early 1940s. However, with the communist revolution in 1949, the mission was closed.
- A mission was begun in Qiqihar, Manchuria, in the early 1930s. Communist control of the area forced the mission's closure before 1949.
- With the closure of the Chinese missions in 1949, the unemployed missionaries were soon sent to Kobe, Japan. This field, the only one currently operated by the RPCNA, is the site of a small mission presbytery.

Other missionary works supported by the RPCNA include the National Reformed Presbyterian Church of Bolivia and Reformed Presbyterian Church in Chile.

Several short-term mission trips are sponsored by the denomination each year, both foreign and domestic. As well, some RPCNA members work formally or informally as missionaries in other countries, although not officially with the RPCNA's Global Mission Board.

== Relations with other churches ==
Fraternal relations are maintained with the following bodies:

- Other Reformed Presbyterian Churches:
  - Reformed Presbyterian Church of Australia
  - Reformed Presbyterian Church of Ireland
  - Reformed Presbyterian Church of Scotland
  - Reformed Presbyterian Church of South Sudan
  - Trinity Community Christian Fellowship (the aforementioned congregation in Larnaca, Cyprus)
- American Presbyterian Church
- Associate Reformed Presbyterian Church
- The North American Synod of the Free Church of Scotland
- Korean-American Presbyterian Church
- Église réformée du Québec
- Orthodox Presbyterian Church
- Presbyterian Church in America
- Reformed Church in the United States
- United Reformed Churches in North America

From 1946 through 2008 inclusive RPCNA held membership in the National Association of Evangelicals.

== See also ==
- Stafford Reformed Presbyterian Church
- Reformed Presbyterian Church of Vernon
