= Lynx, Ohio =

Unincorporated community in Ohio, U.S.

Coordinates: 38°46′23″N 83°24′47″W

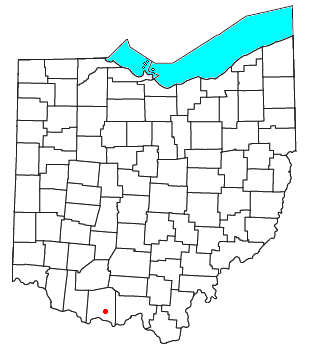
Location of Lynx, Ohio

Lynx is an unincorporated community in southwestern Brush Creek Township, Adams County, Ohio, United States. It has a post office with the ZIP code 45650. It is located along State Route 125.

== History ==
A post office called Lynx has been in operation since 1879. The community was named after the lynx, which once was a common sight in the area.

Among its notable people is former Major League Baseball pitcher John Purdin.

== Gallery ==
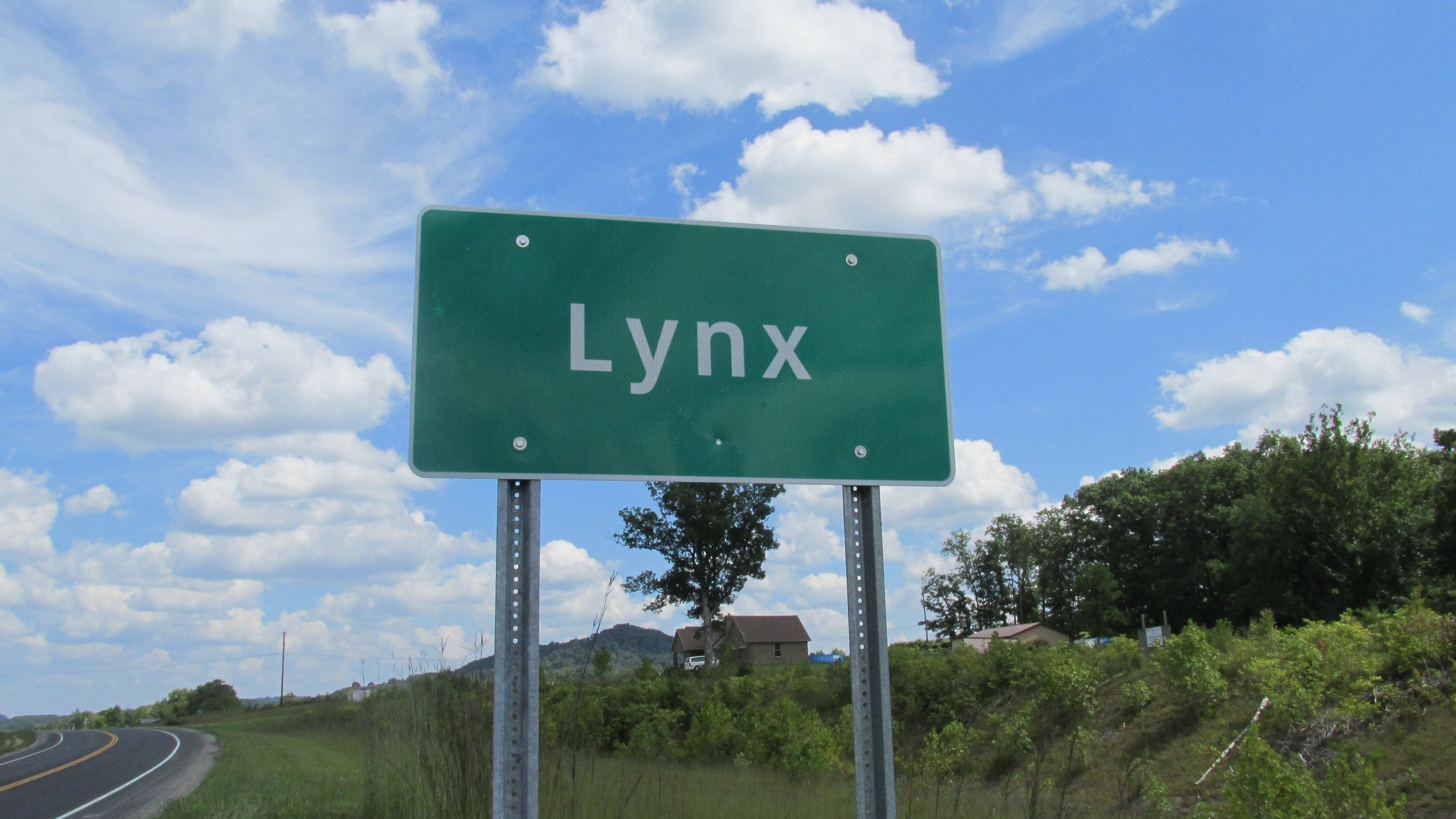
Lynx community sign

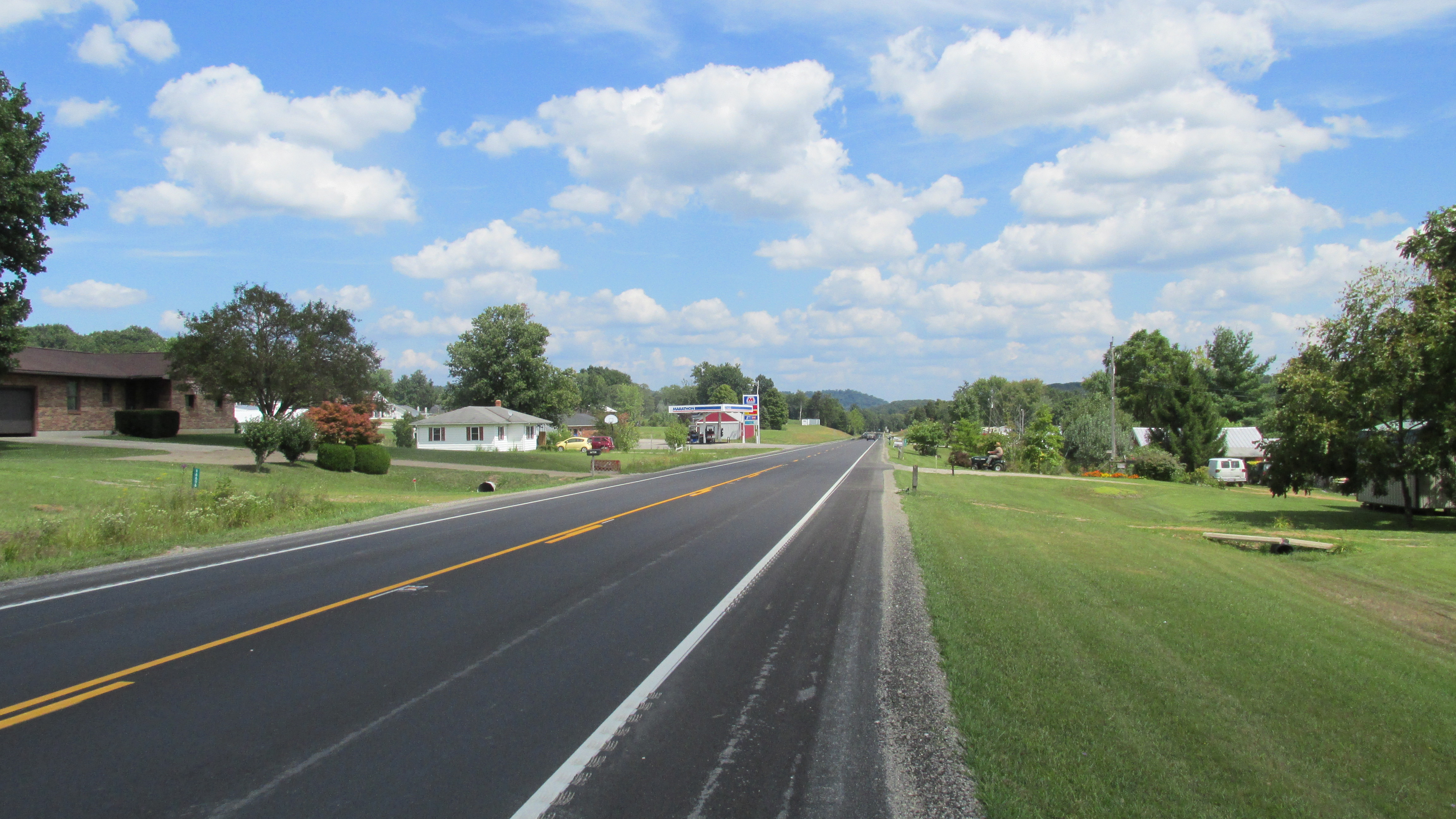
Looking east on Ohio State Route 125 in Lynx
