= Reformed Presbyterian Theological Seminary =

Seminary in Pennsylvania

Coordinates: 40.4473°N 79.8977°W

- Type: Reformed Presbyterian seminary
- Established: 1810; 216 years ago
- Affiliations: Reformed Presbyterian
- Religious affiliation: Reformed Presbyterian Church of North America
- President: Barry York
- Location: Pittsburgh, Pennsylvania, United States
- Campus: Urban
- Website: www.rpts.edu

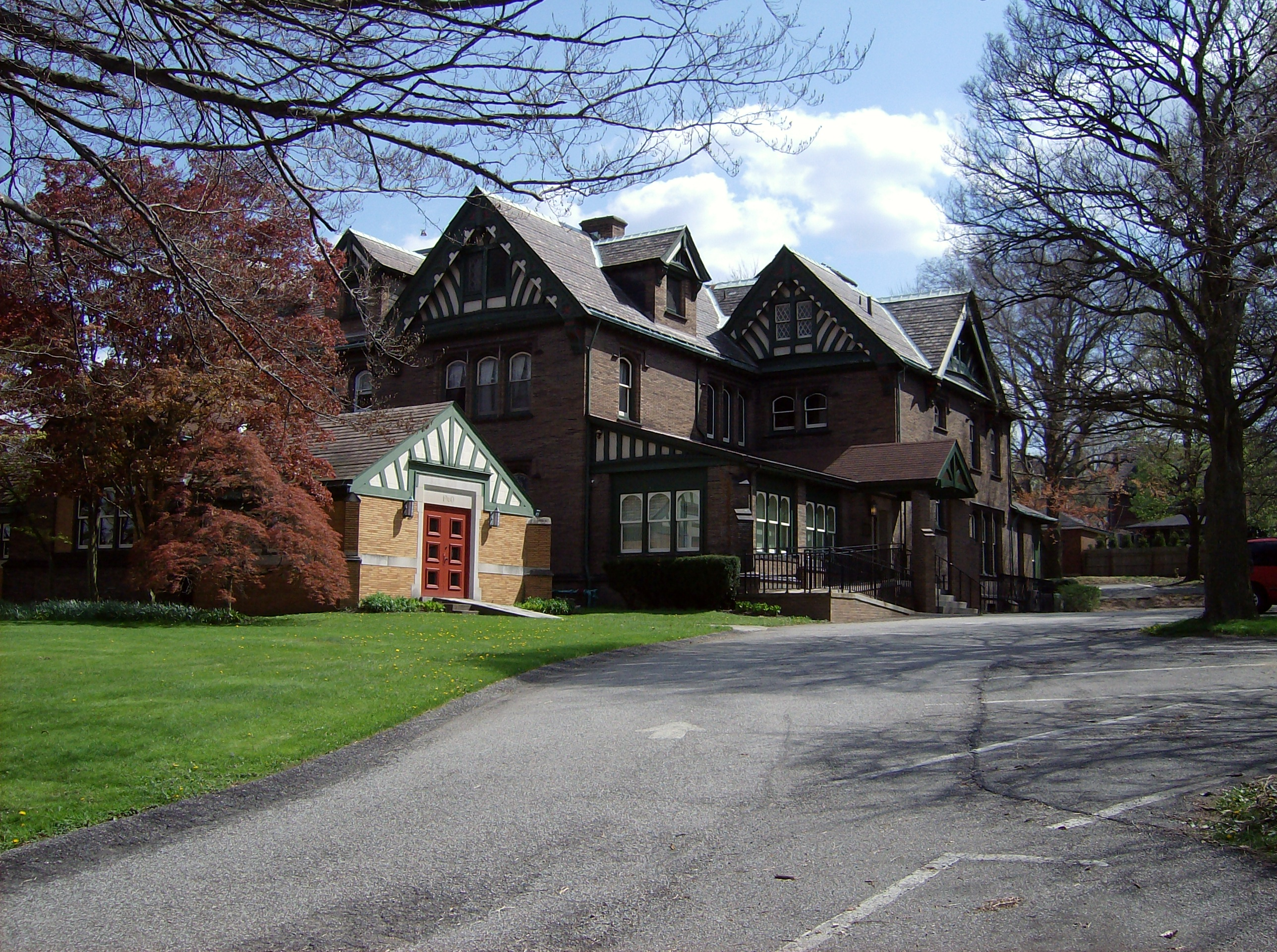
Reformed Presbyterian Theological Seminary

The Reformed Presbyterian Theological Seminary (RPTS) is a Reformed Presbyterian seminary in Point Breeze, Pennsylvania. RPTS is a ministry of the Reformed Presbyterian Church of North America and was founded in 1810, making it the fifth oldest seminary in the United States.

== History ==
Soon after the organization in 1798 of what is now called the Reformed Presbyterian Church of North America (in Philadelphia), steps were taken to establish a seminary for the education of its students of theology. Classes commenced in 1810, making RPTS the fifth oldest seminary in the United States. During its first 46 years, RPTS moved to at least five different locations in several states; In 1856, the seminary relocated to the North Side of Pittsburgh and then to a brick mansion on Pittsburgh's East End in 1923 where it has remained.

== Academics ==
RPTS is accredited by the Association of Theological Schools (ATS). It offers graduate degrees in religion as well as certifications. All RPTS faculty have significant "field" experience in the church; therefore, classes are taught from the pastoral perspective. This emphasis is highlighted by RPTS's brand statement: "Study under pastors".

RPTS also works closely with Kobe Theological Hall, its sister institution in Japan.
