= John Purdin =

American baseball player (1942–2010)

- Pitcher
- Born: July 16, 1942; Lynx, Ohio, U.S.
- Died: March 28, 2010 (aged 67); Charleston, South Carolina, U.S.
- Batted: Right Threw: Right

MLB debut
- September 16, 1964, for the Los Angeles Dodgers

Last MLB appearance
- August 1, 1969, for the Los Angeles Dodgers

MLB statistics
- Win–loss record: 6–4
- earned run average: 3.90
- Strikeouts: 68
- Stats at Baseball Reference

Teams
- Los Angeles Dodgers (1964–1965, 1968–1969)

Career highlights and awards
- World Series champion (1965)

John Nolan Purdin (July 16, 1942 – March 28, 2010) was a Major League Baseball pitcher.

Purdin was born in Lynx, Ohio. He was signed as an amateur free agent by the Los Angeles Dodgers before the start of the 1964 season. He made his debut on September 16, 1964, throwing two innings of no-hit ball in relief against the Pittsburgh Pirates. He struck out Vern Law and Donn Clendenon. Two weeks later on September 30, he threw a two-hit shutout against the Chicago Cubs, giving up his only hits, both singles, to Dick Bertell in the 3rd and 5th inning.

He served in the US Air Force in Germany, at Wiesbaden Air Base, in the early ‘60s, pitching successfully for the base team, the Wiesbaden Flyers.

In the minors, Purdin threw a perfect game against Lexington in 1964. The game went seven innings, on the backend of a doubleheader. During warmups, he pegged his usual starting catcher, Butch Johnson, in the eye. Jim Connor came in from third base to replace him for the night, and Ed Knipple moved to third. Purdin struck out 11 batters in the perfect outing, with Knipple driving in the only run of the game.

At Salisbury, Purdin posted a 14–3 record with a 1.91 ERA and 182 strikeouts in 137 innings pitched, while only giving up 27 walks. For the Spokane Indians in 1967 he led the Pacific Coast League in games started (31) and shutouts (6).

Purdin died in Charleston, South Carolina, at the age of 67.
