= Reformed Presbyterian Church in Chile =

Church

- Classification: Protestant
- Orientation: Reformed
- Theology: Calvinist
- Governance: Presbyterian
- Region: Chile
- Origin: 2017
- Separated from: National Presbyterian Church in Chile
- Branched from: Reformed Presbyterian Church of North America
- Official website: presbiterianareformada.wordpress.com

The Reformed Presbyterian Church in Chile (in Spanish Iglesia Presbiteriana Reformada en Chile or IPRCh) is a Reformed denomination in Chile, founded in 2017, by Pastor Marcelo Sánchez, a missionary from the Reformed Presbyterian Church of North America (RPCNA) formerly linked to the National Presbyterian Church in Chile.

== History ==
In the 2010s, a group of people led by Pastor Marcelo Sánchez (formerly linked to the National Presbyterian Church in Chile), in the city of Lo Prado, adhered to the doctrine of the Reformed Presbyterian Church of North America (RPCNA). In 2017, RPCNA welcomed the group of members as a congregation, as well as Pastor Marcelo Sánchez as a missionary for the denomination.

By 2020, the denomination had already planted churches in Lampa and Santiago.

== Doctrine ==
The denomination subscribes to the Westminster Confession, Westminster Larger Catechism, and Westminster Shorter Catechism and differs from other Presbyterian denominations in the country by adopting exclusive psalmody and Sunday observance.
