= Tulip, Ohio =

Unincorporated community in Ohio, U.S.

Tulip
- Unincorporated community
- Location of Tulip in Ohio
- Coordinates: 38°44′04″N 83°24′54″W
- Country: United States
- State: Ohio
- County: Adams County
- Township: Brush Creek
- Established: 1899 (Post office)
- Post office closed: 1954
- Time zone: UTC-5 (Eastern (ET))
  - Summer (DST): UTC-4 (EDT)
- GNIS feature ID: 1063067

Tulip is an unincorporated community in Brush Creek Township, Adams County, in the U.S. state of Ohio.

== History ==
A post office called Tulip was established in 1899, and remained in operation until 1954.
