= Brush Creek Township, Adams County, Ohio =

Township in Ohio, US

- Township
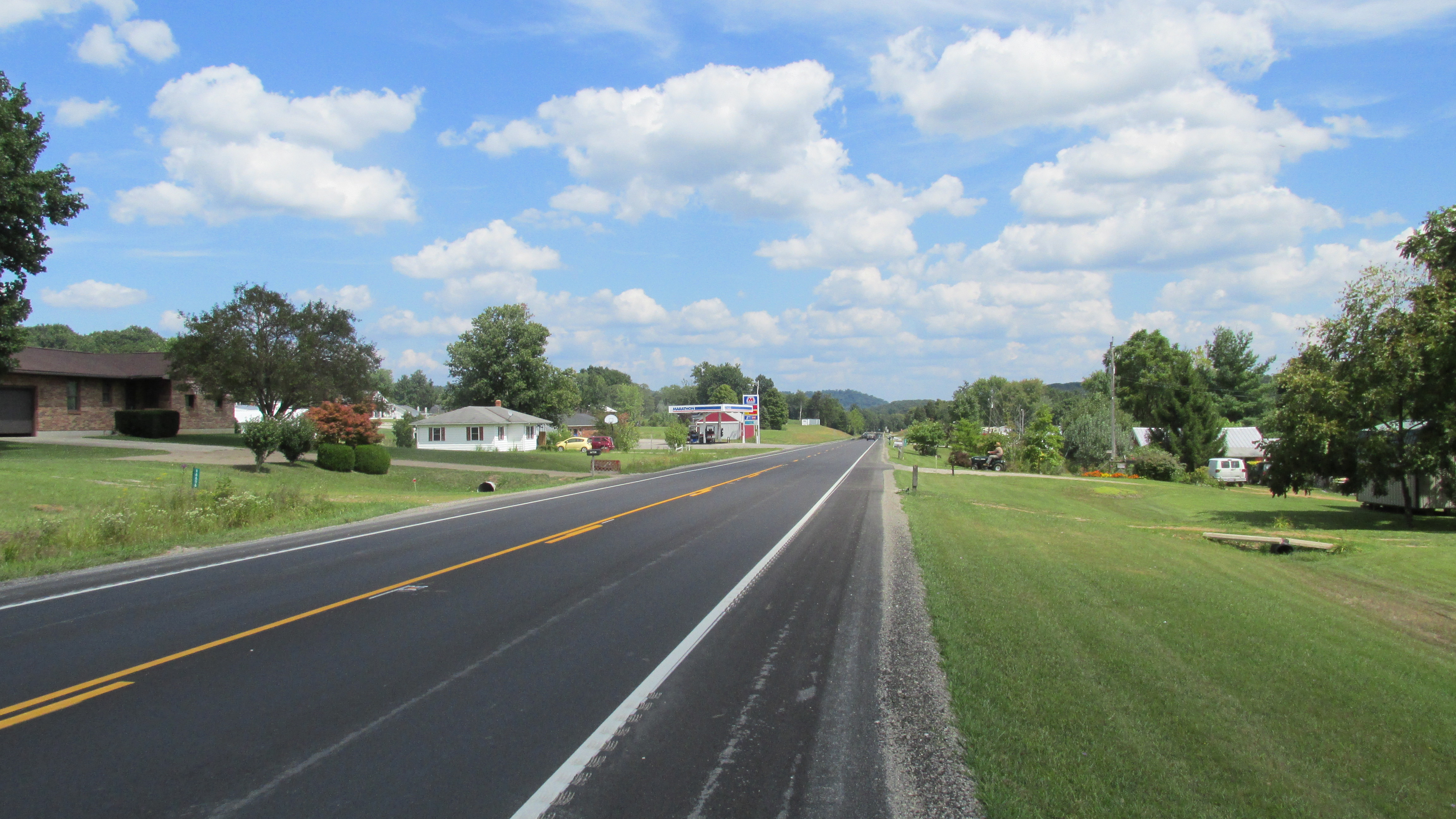
- State Route 125 in Lynx

- Location in Adams County and the state of Ohio.
- Coordinates: 38°48′13″N 83°23′48″W
- Country: United States
- State: Ohio
- County: Adams

Area
  - Total: 41.49 sq mi (107.47 km^{2})
  - Land: 41.48 sq mi (107.43 km^{2})
  - Water: 0.015 sq mi (0.04 km^{2})
- Elevation: 1,145 ft (349 m)

Population (2020)
  - Total: 1,097
  - Density: 30/sq mi (11.5/km^{2})
- Time zone: UTC-5 (Eastern (EST))
  - Summer (DST): UTC-4 (EDT)
- FIPS code: 39-09722
- GNIS feature ID: 1085675

Brush Creek Township is one of the fifteen townships of Adams County, Ohio, United States. The population was 1,097 at the 2020 census.

== Geography ==
Located in the central part of the county, it borders the following townships:

- Meigs Township - north
- Jefferson Township - east
- Green Township - south
- Monroe Township - southwest
- Tiffin Township - west

No municipalities are located in Brush Creek Township, although the unincorporated communities of Lynx, Tulip, and Selig lie within the township's borders.

== Name and history ==
Statewide, other Brush Creek Townships are located in Jefferson, Muskingum, and Scioto counties, plus a Brushcreek Township in Highland County.

== Government ==
The township is governed by a three-member board of trustees, who are elected in November of odd-numbered years to a four-year term beginning on the following January 1. Two are elected in the year after the presidential election and one is elected in the year before it. There is also an elected township fiscal officer, who serves a four-year term beginning on April 1 of the year after the election, which is held in November of the year before the presidential election. Vacancies in the fiscal officership or on the board of trustees are filled by the remaining trustees.
