= Occasional hearing =

Occasional hearing is the practice of attending worship services or preaching by ministers of denominations other than one's own. Historically, the practice has been resisted and is even a matter of church discipline among churches that study confessional integrity. Churches that traditionally have resisted the practice tend to be theologically conservative and confessional. The practice has contributed to multiple anonymous reviews on one particular website of services by visiting worshippers.
