= Ohio State Route 753 =

State highway in southwestern Ohio, US

State Route 753

Route information
- Maintained by ODOT
- Length: 35.35 mi (56.89 km)
- Existed: 1937–present

Major junctions
- South end: SR 41 near Cynthiana
- US 50 / CR 1 in Rainsboro; US 35 near Washington Court House; US 22 in Washington Court House
- North end: US 62 / SR 3 in Washington Court House

Location
- Country: United States
- State: Ohio
- Counties: Highland, Fayette

Highway system
- Ohio State Highway System; Interstate; US; State; Scenic
← SR 752	→ SR 754

State Route 753 (SR 753) is a state highway in Ohio. The route is 35.35 miles (56.89 km) long and is located in eastern Highland County and southeastern Fayette County. The route's southern terminus is at an intersection with SR 41 in Brush Creek Township and its northern terminus is at an intersection with U.S. Route 62 and SR 3 on the border of Washington Court House and Union Township.

== Route description ==
SR 753 begins at an unsignalized T-intersection with SR 41 in Brush Creek Township. The intersection is near the Fort Hill State Memorial and is located between the unincorporated community of Cynthiana and the village of Sinking Spring. The route heads north-northwest towards the community of Carmel where it intersects SR 506 at its eastern terminus. After passing around the eastern end of Rocky Fork Lake and its eponymous state park, the route comes to an intersection with US 50. SR 753 turns right onto US 50 forming a concurrency for about 1 mile (1.6 km). Upon entering Rainsboro, SR 753 breaks off of US 50 at Barrett Mills Road and heads north towards New Petersburg. The route makes a sharp curve to the northeast at New Petersburg and heads through Paint Creek State Park and crosses Walnut Creek on a bridge. Shortly after the park, the route enters Greenfield, the name of the route becomes 7th Street and forms a concurrency with SR 138.

At Jefferson Street (SR 28) in Greenfield, the three routes head east towards the center of the village. At the intersection of Jefferson and Washington Streets, SR 753 turns north ending the concurrency with Routes 28 and 138 but forms another with SR 41. North of the downtown section, the two routes head north until the intersection with Mill Street; there, the routes turn right onto it and exit the village on that street. Shortly after leaving Highland County for Fayette, SR 753 turns off of SR 41 and heads east across Paint Creek. After the bridge, the route curves to the north. On this segment, the route passes through the community of Good Hope and has an interchange with the US 35 bypass of Washington Court House. The route enters the city limits of Washington Court House and soon intersects at a four-way intersection US 22. SR 753 continues north and begins to curve around to the northwest before it ends at an intersection with US 62 and SR 3 northeast of downtown Washington Court House.

== History ==
SR 753 was first designated in 1937 on a route wholly located in Fayette County. The route ran from what is now the northernmost intersection with SR 41 in Perry Township to US 35 southeast of Washington Court House. The route at the southern terminus was SR 70, but SR 70 continued south of Greenfield along the remainder of what is now SR 753 to SR 41 in Brush Creek Township. This section of SR 70 had been a part of the state highway system since 1926. The route would not experience any major changes until 1962 when many highways statewide were renumbered due to their numbers being identical with Interstate highways; in that year, SR 753 was extended south of Greenfield taking over the southern portion of SR 70 which was being deleted due to the presence of Interstate 70 in Ohio. Construction started on an extension of the road from US 35 to US 22 in 1970; this extension was completed by 1972. A $5 million project to extend SR 753 from US 22 to US 62 along Stuckey Road and a new right-of-way was completed in May 2014.

== Major intersections ==
County	Location	mi	km	Destinations	Notes
Highland	Brush Creek Township	0.00	0.00	SR 41 – Bainbridge, Sinking Spring	
Highland	Brush Creek Township	3.09	4.97	SR 506 west / CR 17 (Cynthiana Road)	Eastern terminus of SR 506
Highland	Paint Township	7.10	11.43	US 50 west – Hillsboro	Southern end of US 50 concurrency
Highland	Paint Township	8.04	12.94	US 50 east / CR 1 (Barrett Mills Road) – Chillicothe	Northern end of US 50 concurrency
Highland	Greenfield	18.19	29.27	SR 138 south (Carford Pike) – Hillsboro	Southern end of SR 138 concurrency
Highland	Greenfield	18.50	29.77	SR 28 west (Jefferson Street) / North 7th Street	Southern end of SR 28 concurrency
Highland	Greenfield	18.94	30.48	SR 28 east / SR 41 south / SR 138 north (Jefferson Street) / South Washington Street	Northern end of SR 28 / SR 138 concurrency; southern end of SR 41 concurrency
Fayette	Perry Township	21.05	33.88	SR 41 north – Washington Court House	Northern end of SR 41 concurrency
Fayette	Union Township	31.52– 31.71	50.73– 51.03	US 35 – Chillicothe, Dayton	Interchange
Fayette	Washington Court House	33.68	54.20	US 22 – Washington Court House, Circleville	
Fayette	Washington Court House	35.35	56.89	US 62 / SR 3 – Washington Court House, Columbus	
1.000 mi = 1.609 km; 1.000 km = 0.621 mi: Concurrency terminus
