= National Register of Historic Places listings in Highland County, Ohio =

Location of Highland County in Ohio

This is a list of the National Register of Historic Places listings in Highland County, Ohio.

This is intended to be a complete list of the properties and districts on the National Register of Historic Places in Highland County, Ohio, United States. The locations of National Register properties and districts for which the latitude and longitude coordinates are included below, may be seen in an online map.

There are 28 properties and districts listed on the National Register in the county. Another property was once listed but has been removed.

This National Park Service list is complete through NPS recent listings posted February 6, 2026.

== Current listings ==
	Name on the Register	Image	Date listed	Location	City or town	Description
1	Barretts Mill	Barretts Mill	December 26, 1972 (#72001024)	County Road 1A and Rocky Fork Creek, southeast of Rainsboro; also on Factory Branch Creek; 39°12′07″N 83°23′14″W	Paint Township	Factory Branch Creek represents a boundary increase of July 24, 1979. This mill and covered bridge was destroyed by fire on October 14, 1980.
2	Bell Mansion	Bell Mansion	November 25, 1980 (#80003099)	225 Oak St. 39°12′05″N 83°37′17″W	Hillsboro	
3	Bell's First Home	Bell's First Home	November 25, 1980 (#80003096)	222 Beech St. 39°12′15″N 83°36′53″W	Hillsboro	
4	Bell's Opera House	Bell's Opera House	November 25, 1980 (#80003097)	109-119 S. High St. 39°12′06″N 83°36′43″W	Hillsboro	
5	C. S. Bell Foundry and Showroom	C. S. Bell Foundry and Showroom	November 25, 1980 (#80003098)	154-158 W. Main St. 39°12′10″N 83°36′49″W	Hillsboro	
6	East Main Street Historic District	East Main Street Historic District	June 1, 1982 (#82003594)	E. Main and E. Walnut Sts. 39°12′04″N 83°36′30″W	Hillsboro	
7	Eubanks-Tytus House	Eubanks-Tytus House	February 27, 1979 (#79001865)	Southeast of Hillsboro on State Route 41; 39°08′55″N 83°21′59″W	Brushcreek Township	
8	Fort Hill State Park	Fort Hill State Park	November 10, 1970 (#70000500)	Southeast of Hillsboro on State Route 41; 39°06′38″N 83°24′10″W	Brushcreek Township	
9	Gist Settlement Historic District		October 7, 2024 (#100010878)	Roughly bounded by Rollins Ln, Gist Settlement Rd, and Turner Ln; 39°18′48″N 83°38′56″W	New Vienna	
10	Greenfield Commercial Historic District		January 7, 2021 (#100005996)	Roughly bounded by Jefferson, Washington, and Mirabeau Sts. 39°21′04″N 83°22′58″W	Greenfield	
11	Highland County Courthouse	Highland County Courthouse	August 24, 1978 (#78002087)	Main and High Sts. 39°12′09″N 83°36′44″W	Hillsboro	
12	Highland Egg and Poultry Company Building	Highland Egg and Poultry Company Building	January 24, 2002 (#01001524)	135 N. West St. 39°12′13″N 83°36′50″W	Hillsboro	Also known as The Pants Factory. Now senior housing.
13	Hillsboro Historic Business District	Hillsboro Historic Business District	April 19, 1984 (#84003727)	Roughly bounded by Beech, Walnut, East, and West Sts. 39°12′08″N 83°36′44″W	Hillsboro	
14	Hirons-Brown House	Hirons-Brown House	December 12, 1976 (#76001455)	Southwest of Buford on Buford-Bardwell Rd. 39°03′51″N 83°51′50″W	Clay Township	
15	Robert D. Lilley House	Robert D. Lilley House	June 17, 1982 (#82003595)	7915 State Route 124; 39°11′59″N 83°35′43″W	Hillsboro	
16	Samuel Lyle Log House	Samuel Lyle Log House	July 28, 1995 (#95000939)	7190 Pondlick Rd., northwest of Seaman; 39°02′21″N 83°37′29″W	Concord Township	
17	Lynchburg Covered Bridge	Lynchburg Covered Bridge	March 16, 1976 (#76001456)	East Fork of the Little Miami River; 39°14′42″N 83°47′40″W	Lynchburg	Extends into Clinton County
18	Morrow-Overman-Fairley House	Morrow-Overman-Fairley House	May 31, 1984 (#84003729)	404 N. High St. 39°12′22″N 83°36′37″W	Hillsboro	
19	Mother Thompson House	Mother Thompson House	June 1, 1982 (#82003596)	133 Willow St. 39°12′20″N 83°36′33″W	Hillsboro	Due to extreme disrepair, the Mother Thompson House was demolished on May 19, 2017.
20	New Market Township Community House	New Market Township Community House	March 10, 2004 (#04000151)	4641 U.S. Route 62, southwest of Hillsboro; 39°08′15″N 83°40′06″W	New Market Township	
21	Rocky Fork Park Group	Rocky Fork Park Group	June 18, 1973 (#73001478)	Southern side of Rocky Fork Lake east of Fisherman's Wharf; 39°10′36″N 83°29′58″W	Marshall Township	Location is for the West Mound, one of three mounds in the group
22	Rocky Fork Park Site	Rocky Fork Park Site	June 18, 1973 (#73001479)	South of Rocky Fork and west of Fisherman Wharf Rd. 39°10′19″N 83°30′40″W	Marshall Township	A pair of circular enclosures on a hillside
23	Saint Mary's Episcopal Church and Parish House	Saint Mary's Episcopal Church and Parish House	September 8, 1988 (#88001421)	232 N. High St. 39°12′16″N 83°36′38″W	Hillsboro	
24	William Scott House	William Scott House	November 5, 1987 (#87001981)	338 W. Main St. 39°12′13″N 83°37′04″W	Hillsboro	
25	Samuel Smith House and Tannery	Samuel Smith House and Tannery	July 5, 1978 (#78002086)	103 Jefferson St. 39°21′09″N 83°22′45″W	Greenfield	
26	Travellers' Rest Inn	Travellers' Rest Inn	May 15, 1979 (#79001864)	Jefferson St. and McArthur Way; 39°21′07″N 83°22′43″W	Greenfield	
27	Trop Farm	Trop Farm	April 1, 1982 (#82003597)	6250 Mad River Rd., west of Hillsboro; 39°10′53″N 83°40′32″W	New Market Township	
28	Workman Works	Workman Works	October 26, 1971 (#71000641)	4206 Certier Rd. 39°07′27″N 83°48′52″W	Salem Township	Also known as Fort Salem.

== Former listing ==
	Name on the Register	Image	Date listed	Date removed	Location	City or town	Description
1	Plum Run Mound		Unavailable (#72001592)	1974	Address Restricted	Rainsboro	

== See also ==
- List of National Historic Landmarks in Ohio
- Listings in neighboring counties: Adams, Brown, Clinton, Fayette, Pike, Ross
- National Register of Historic Places listings in Ohio
