= Rocky Fork =

Rocky Fork may refer to:

- Rocky Fork (Crooked River), a stream in Missouri
- Rocky Fork (Licking River tributary), a stream in Ohio
- Rocky Fork, Ohio, an unincorporated community
- Rocky Fork State Park (Ohio), in Highland County
  - Rocky Fork Park Site, an archaeological site in the above park
- Rocky Fork State Park (Tennessee), in Unicoi and Greene counties
- Rocky Fork, West Virginia, an unincorporated community in Kanawha County
