= Berryville =

Berryville may refer to:

- Berryville, Arkansas
- Berry, Kentucky, formerly known as Berryville
- Berryville, Texas
- Berryville, Virginia
- Berryville, West Virginia

== See also ==
- Barryville (disambiguation)
- Berrysville, Ohio
