= Ohio State Route 506 =

State highway in Highland County, Ohio, US

State Route 506

Route information
- Maintained by ODOT
- Length: 4.34 mi (6.98 km)
- Existed: 1937–present

Major junctions
- West end: SR 124 in Marshall
- East end: SR 753 in Carmel

Location
- Country: United States
- State: Ohio
- Counties: Highland

Highway system
- Ohio State Highway System; Interstate; US; State; Scenic
← SR 505	→ SR 507

State Route 506 (SR 506) is an east–west state route in southern Ohio. Existing entirely in eastern Highland County, SR 506 has its western terminus at SR 124 in the hamlet of Marshall. Its eastern terminus is at SR 753 in another unincorporated community, Carmel.

== Route description ==
SR 506 begins in the unincorporated community of Marshall at its junction with SR 124. The highway departs the hamlet heading eastward. It follows a reverse curve to the north, then takes on an east-northeasterly path into rural Marshall Township, dominated primarily by open fields. SR 506 intersects Blue Ribbon Road, then continues on to meet Turkey Road (County Road 19 or CR 19). Passing by a few patches of trees amid the open land, SR 506 next comes to back-to-back intersections with McCoppin Mill Road (CR 51) and Slate Hill Road (CR 77). Next, the state route experiences a series of smooth curves that turn it to the east, east-northeast, east again, and east-northeast yet again. At this point, as SR 506 has passed into Brush Creek Township, a pair of thicker patches of woods abut the north side of SR 506, which then re-enters fully into farmland. SR 506 next intersects Skeen Road, then curves to the northeast, and meets Carmel Road (CR 76). Immediately after this intersection, SR 506 arrives at its junction with SR 753 in the hamlet of Carmel, where the highway comes to an end. The road that continues beyond SR 753 after SR 506 terminates is Cynthiana Road.

== History ==
The SR 506 designation came into being in 1937, along the routing that it currently occupies. The only change that has occurred along SR 506 since its inception is the route that it intersects at its eastern terminus. As SR 124 has always been the highway serving as SR 506's western endpoint, the highway at its eastern end was first designated SR 70. Later on, that highway would be re-designated as SR 753.

== Major intersections ==
The entire route is in Highland County.

Location	mi	km	Destinations	Notes
Marshall Township	0.00	0.00	SR 124 / Main Street – Sinking Spring, Hillsboro	
Brush Creek Township	4.34	6.98	SR 753 / Cynthiana Road	
1.000 mi = 1.609 km; 1.000 km = 0.621 mi
