= Samantha, Ohio =

Unincorporated community in Ohio, U.S.

Coordinates: 39°17′00″N 83°35′31″W

Samantha is an unincorporated community in Highland County, in the U.S. state of Ohio.

== History ==
Samantha was laid out in 1845, and was named after the first local girl whom the founders would encounter while deciding upon a suitable name. A post office called Beesons Store was established in 1836, the name was changed to Samantha in 1848, and the post office closed in 1867.
