= Folsom, Ohio =

Unincorporated community in Highland County, United States

Coordinates: 39°05′42″N 83°35′34″W

Folsom is an unincorporated community in Highland County, in the U.S. state of Ohio.

== History ==
A post office was established at Folsom in 1886, and remained in operation until 1905. The community's name honors Frances Folsom Cleveland, First Lady of the United States from 1886 to 1889.
