= Barryville =

Barryville may refer to:

- Barryville, Missouri
- Barryville, New York

== See also ==
- Berryville (disambiguation)
