= Allensburg, Ohio =

Unincorporated community in Ohio, U.S.

Coordinates: 39°12′16″N 83°46′38″W

Allensburg is an unincorporated community in Highland County, in the U.S. state of Ohio.

== History ==
Allensburg was platted in 1839, and named after William Allen, a politician who served as the 31st governor of Ohio. A post office called Allensburgh was established in 1843, and remained in operation until 1864.
