= Bridges, Ohio =

Unincorporated community in Ohio, U.S.

Coordinates: 39°18′17″N 83°31′22″W

Bridges is an unincorporated community in Highland County, in the U.S. state of Ohio.

== History ==
A post office was established at Bridges in 1891, and remained in operation until it was discontinued in 1905. The community is named “Bridges” for the fact there were four bridges near the town site.
