= Rocky Fork, Ohio =

Unincorporated community in Ohio, U.S.

Coordinates: 40°09′46″N 82°17′29″W

Rocky Fork is an unincorporated community in Licking County, in the U.S. state of Ohio.

== History ==
A post office called Rocky Fork was established in 1858, and remained in operation until 1902. The community takes its name from nearby Rocky Fork.
