= Rocky Fork Park Site =

Archaeological site in Ohio, United States

- U.S. National Register of Historic Places
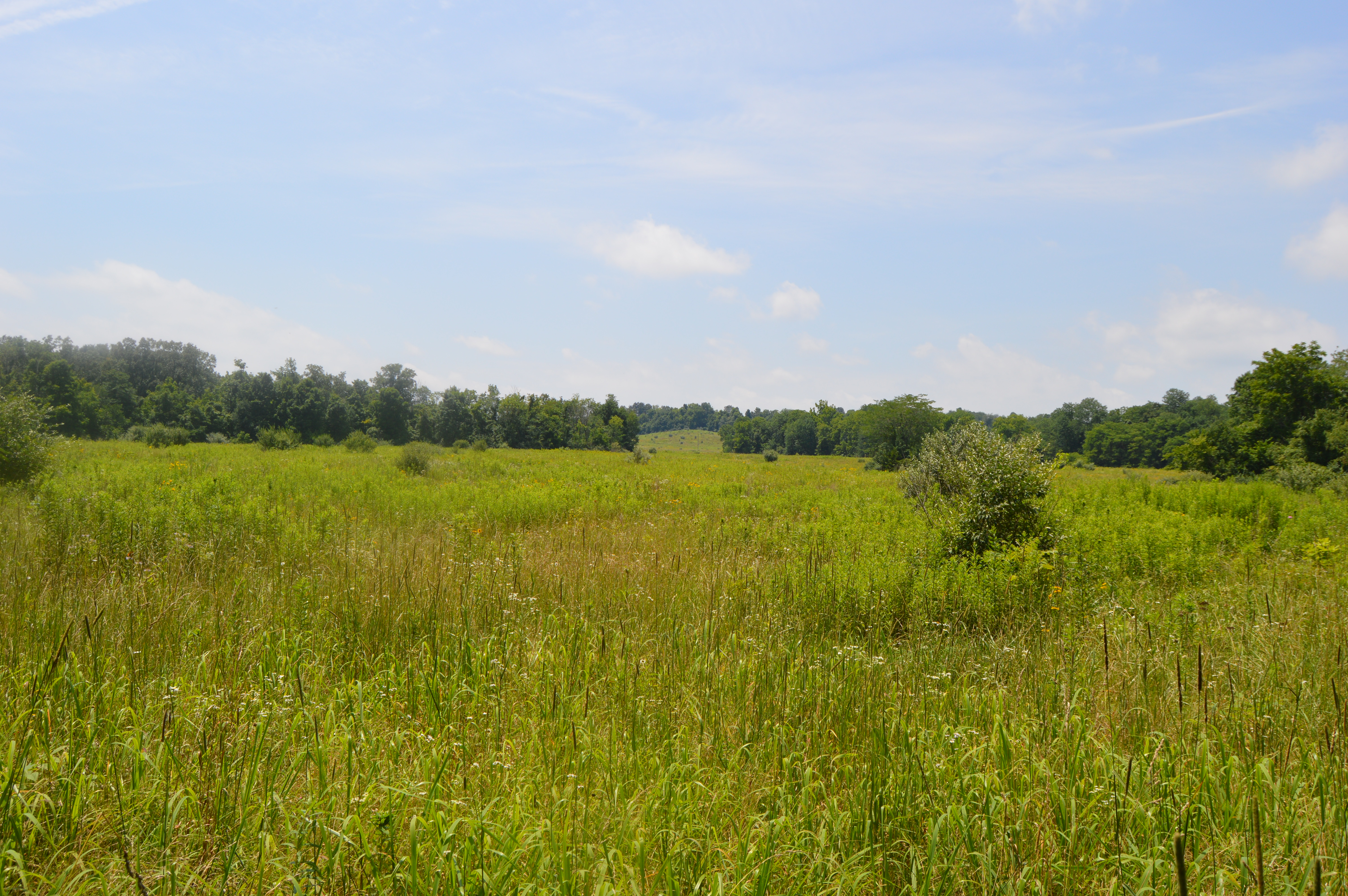
- Overview of the site

- Location within Ohio Location within the United States
- Location: South of Rocky Fork, west of Fisherman Wharf Rd., and northwest of Marshall, Ohio
- Coordinates: 39°10′19″N 83°30′40″W
- Area: 3 acres (1.2 ha)
- NRHP reference No.: 73001479
- Added to NRHP: June 18, 1973

The Rocky Fork Park Site is an archaeological site in the southeastern part of the U.S. state of Ohio. Located in Rocky Fork State Park in eastern Highland County, the site's earthworks have been designated a historic site because of their archaeological importance.

The site comprises a pair of circular enclosures, one within the other, which sit atop the edge of a hill. Because the tops of the enclosures are level, the western side is barely distinguishable from the adjacent ridgeline, while the eastern side is 11 feet (3.4 m) higher than the hillside immediately below it. Both earthworks include "gateways" on their eastern sides, which because of their location on the hillside produce in the observer a sense of being within an amphitheatre.

Almost no changes have been made to the site in the historic period; the forest originally covering the site has been removed to permit its use as pastureland, but the field has never been plowed. The earthworks are believed to have been the work of Hopewellian peoples, who lived in the region for the millennium ending around AD 700. While the Hopewell are known to have built many hilltop enclosures, including the large Highland County site known as Fort Hill, the placement of the Rocky Fork Site is unique. Like most Hopewell sites, it is believed to have been built for ceremonial purposes.

In 1973, the Rocky Fork Park Site was listed on the National Register of Historic Places, along with a Hopewellian mound group also within Rocky Fork State Park. Both locations qualified for inclusion on the National Register because of their archaeological importance. They are two of four Highland County archaeological sites on the Register, along with Fort Hill and the Workman Works.
