= Boston, Highland County, Ohio =

Unincorporated community in Ohio, U.S.

Coordinates: 39°12′55″N 83°30′40″W

Boston is an unincorporated community in Highland County, in the U.S. state of Ohio.

== History ==
Boston was laid out in 1840, and named after Boston, Massachusetts. A variant name was Dallas. A post office called Dallas was established in 1845, and remained in operation until 1905.
