= Dodsonville, Ohio =

Unincorporated community in Ohio, U.S.

Coordinates: 39°12′08″N 83°48′53″W

Dodsonville is an unincorporated community in Highland County, in the U.S. state of Ohio.

== History ==
Dodsonville was laid out in 1839, and named after Joshua Dodson, a government surveyor. A post office was established at Dodsonville in 1843, and remained in operation until 1906.
