= Hollowtown, Ohio =

Unincorporated community in Ohio, U.S.

Coordinates: 39°06′42″N 83°46′54″W

Hollowtown is an unincorporated community in Highland County, in the U.S. state of Ohio.

== History ==
A post office was established at Hollowtown in 1861, and remained in operation until 1905. The community derives its name from Anthony Hollow, a local merchant.
