= Berrysville, Ohio =

Unincorporated community in Ohio, U.S.

Coordinates: 39°07′42″N 83°33′31″W

Berrysville is an unincorporated community in Highland County, in the U.S. state of Ohio.

== History ==
Berrysville was laid out in 1846, and named in honor of the local Berryman family. A post office called Berrysville was established in 1851, and remained in operation until 1909.
