= Highland County, Ohio =

County in Ohio, United States

- County
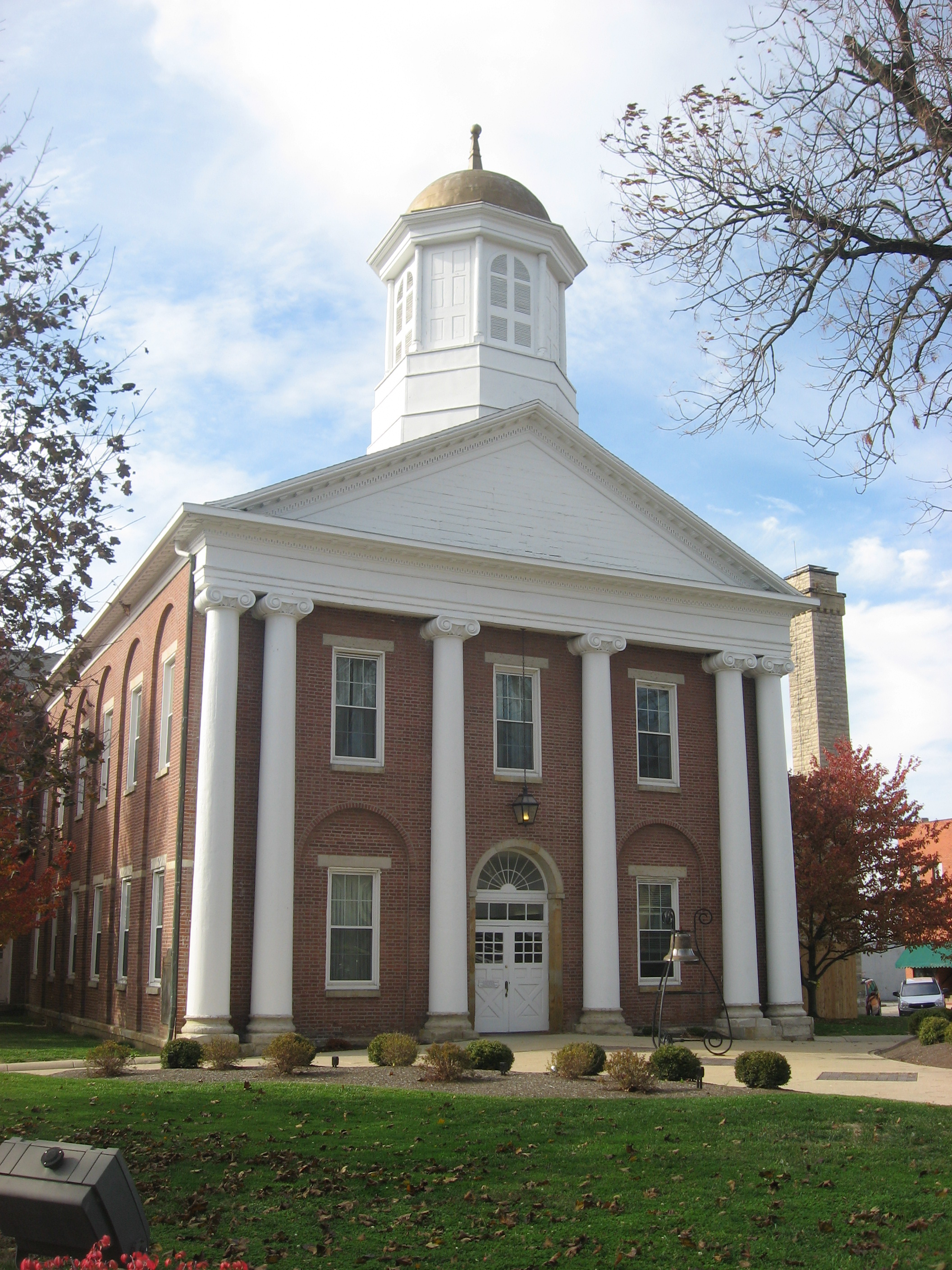
- Highland County Courthouse

- Flag Seal

- Location within the U.S. state of Ohio
- Coordinates: 39°11′N 83°36′W
- Country: United States
- State: Ohio
- Founded: May 1, 1805
- Named for: hilly topography which divides the Little Miami and Scioto river watersheds
- Seat: Hillsboro
- Largest city: Hillsboro

Area
  - Total: 558 sq mi (1,450 km^{2})
  - Land: 553 sq mi (1,430 km^{2})
  - Water: 4.7 sq mi (12 km^{2}) 0.8%

Population (2020)
  - Total: 43,317
  - Estimate (2025): 43,823 ▲
  - Density: 78.3/sq mi (30.2/km^{2})
- Time zone: UTC−5 (Eastern)
  - Summer (DST): UTC−4 (EDT)
- Congressional district: 2nd
- Website: co.highland.oh.us

Highland County is a county located in the U.S. state of Ohio. As of the 2020 census, the population was 43,317. Its county seat is Hillsboro. The county is named for the topography which is hilly and divides the watersheds of the Little Miami and Scioto Rivers. Highland County was created on May 1, 1805, from land taken from Ross, Adams, and Clermont counties.

== Geography ==
According to the U.S. Census Bureau, the county has a total area of 558 square miles (1,450 km^{2}), of which 553 square miles (1,430 km^{2}) is land and 4.7 square miles (12 km^{2}) (0.8%) is water.

=== Adjacent counties ===
- Fayette County (north)
- Ross County (northeast)
- Pike County (east)
- Adams County (southeast)
- Brown County (southwest)
- Clinton County (northwest)

== Demographics ==
Historical population
Census	Pop.	Note	%±
1810	5,766		—
1820	12,308		113.5%
1830	16,345		32.8%
1840	22,269		36.2%
1850	25,781		15.8%
1860	27,773		7.7%
1870	29,133		4.9%
1880	30,281		3.9%
1890	29,048		−4.1%
1900	30,982		6.7%
1910	28,711		−7.3%
1920	27,610		−3.8%
1930	25,416		−7.9%
1940	27,099		6.6%
1950	28,188		4.0%
1960	29,716		5.4%
1970	28,996		−2.4%
1980	33,477		15.5%
1990	35,728		6.7%
2000	40,875		14.4%
2010	43,589		6.6%
2020	43,317		−0.6%
2025 (est.)	43,823	▲	1.2%
U.S. Decennial Census; 1790-1960 1900-1990; 1990-2000 2020

=== 2020 census ===
As of the 2020 census, the county had a population of 43,317. The median age was 41.3 years. 23.9% of residents were under the age of 18 and 18.9% of residents were 65 years of age or older. For every 100 females there were 98.2 males, and for every 100 females age 18 and over there were 96.9 males age 18 and over.

The racial makeup of the county was 93.9% White, 1.2% Black or African American, 0.3% American Indian and Alaska Native, 0.3% Asian, <0.1% Native Hawaiian and Pacific Islander, 0.4% from some other race, and 4.0% from two or more races. Hispanic or Latino residents of any race comprised 1.0% of the population.

26.3% of residents lived in urban areas, while 73.7% lived in rural areas.

There were 16,876 households in the county, of which 30.3% had children under the age of 18 living in them. Of all households, 49.8% were married-couple households, 18.2% were households with a male householder and no spouse or partner present, and 23.6% were households with a female householder and no spouse or partner present. About 26.7% of all households were made up of individuals and 12.8% had someone living alone who was 65 years of age or older.

There were 18,981 housing units, of which 11.1% were vacant. Among occupied housing units, 71.5% were owner-occupied and 28.5% were renter-occupied. The homeowner vacancy rate was 1.6% and the rental vacancy rate was 6.0%.

=== Racial and ethnic composition ===
Highland County, Ohio – Racial and ethnic composition Note: the US Census treats Hispanic/Latino as an ethnic category. This table excludes Latinos from the racial categories and assigns them to a separate category. Hispanics/Latinos may be of any race.
Race / Ethnicity (NH = Non-Hispanic)	Pop 1980	Pop 1990	Pop 2000	Pop 2010	Pop 2020	% 1980	% 1990	% 2000	% 2010	% 2020
White alone (NH)	32,532	34,785	39,472	41,852	40,492	97.18%	97.36%	96.57%	96.02%	93.48%
Black or African American alone (NH)	682	685	603	597	518	2.04%	1.92%	1.48%	1.37%	1.20%
Native American or Alaska Native alone (NH)	74	72	88	99	109	0.22%	0.20%	0.22%	0.23%	0.25%
Asian alone (NH)	64	71	128	99	110	0.19%	0.20%	0.31%	0.23%	0.25%
Native Hawaiian or Pacific Islander alone (NH)	x	x	14	1	8	x	x	0.03%	0.00%	0.02%
Other race alone (NH)	11	7	26	25	96	0.03%	0.02%	0.06%	0.06%	0.22%
Mixed race or Multiracial (NH)	x	x	328	597	1,560	x	x	0.80%	1.37%	3.60%
Hispanic or Latino (any race)	114	108	216	319	424	0.34%	0.30%	0.53%	0.73%	0.98%
Total	33,477	35,728	40,875	43,589	43,317	100.00%	100.00%	100.00%	100.00%	100.00%

=== 2010 census ===
As of the 2010 United States census, there were 43,589 people, 16,693 households, and 11,819 families residing in the county. The population density was 78.8 inhabitants per square mile (30.4/km^{2}). There were 19,380 housing units at an average density of 35.0 per square mile (13.5/km^{2}). The racial makeup of the county was 96.5% white, 1.4% black or African American, 0.3% American Indian, 0.2% Asian, 0.1% from other races, and 1.5% from two or more races. Those of Hispanic or Latino origin made up 0.7% of the population. In terms of ancestry, 23.8% were German, 14.9% were Irish, 14.3% were American, and 10.7% were English.

Of the 16,693 households, 34.0% had children under the age of 18 living with them, 53.1% were married couples living together, 11.9% had a female householder with no husband present, 29.2% were non-families, and 24.3% of all households were made up of individuals. The average household size was 2.58 and the average family size was 3.04. The median age was 39.2 years.

The median income for a household in the county was $39,844 and the median income for a family was $48,604. Males had a median income of $38,892 versus $29,167 for females. The per capita income for the county was $18,966. About 12.4% of families and 16.2% of the population were below the poverty line, including 22.2% of those under age 18 and 12.7% of those age 65 or over.

=== 2000 census ===
As of the census of 2010, there were 43,589 people living in Highland County. The population density is 78.8 people per square mile. The county is made up of 96.4% White, 1.5% Black or African American, 0.3% Native American, 0.3% Asian, 1.5% from two or more races, and 0.8% Hispanic or Latino.

This county is also made up of 6.2% of people under the age of 5, 24.7% of people under the age of 18, and 16.5% of people over the age of 65. The median age is 39.2. The county is also 51% female.

There are 16,963 households in Highland County as of the 2010 census. The average household size is 2.58 persons, while the average family size is 3.04 persons. According to the 2010 census, 41.9% of the houses in Highland County had children under the age of 18 living with them, 53.07% of the houses were married couples living together, 11.09% of the houses had a female householder with no husband present, and 29.91% of the houses were non-families. Individuals made up 24.33% of all households, and 11.02% had someone living alone who was 65 years of age or older.

According to the census, 81.5% of people over the age of 25 is at least a high school graduate and 11.1% of people over the age of 25 have earned at least a bachelor's degree. The median household income is $39,641 and 17.6% of people live below the poverty line. The per capita income of Highland County is $19,557.

== Politics ==
Highland County is a Republican stronghold county in presidential elections. The last time it voted for the Democratic presidential candidate was for Lyndon B. Johnson in 1964.

United States presidential election results for Highland County, Ohio
Year	Republican		Democratic		Third party(ies)	
Year	No.	%	No.	%	No.	%
1856	1,810	37.37%	2,140	44.18%	894	18.46%
1860	2,409	45.34%	2,272	42.76%	632	11.90%
1864	3,120	54.61%	2,593	45.39%	0	0.00%
1868	3,038	51.60%	2,850	48.40%	0	0.00%
1872	3,171	51.91%	2,933	48.01%	5	0.08%
1876	3,341	50.06%	3,323	49.79%	10	0.15%
1880	3,648	50.91%	3,490	48.71%	27	0.38%
1884	3,683	50.84%	3,438	47.45%	124	1.71%
1888	3,576	48.61%	3,489	47.42%	292	3.97%
1892	3,496	49.14%	3,153	44.32%	465	6.54%
1896	4,106	50.32%	3,909	47.91%	144	1.76%
1900	4,078	49.53%	3,938	47.83%	218	2.65%
1904	4,205	54.00%	3,321	42.65%	261	3.35%
1908	4,149	51.23%	3,823	47.21%	126	1.56%
1912	2,757	36.96%	3,314	44.43%	1,388	18.61%
1916	3,727	47.81%	3,964	50.85%	105	1.35%
1920	7,570	57.06%	5,654	42.62%	43	0.32%
1924	6,845	57.16%	4,583	38.27%	548	4.58%
1928	8,325	68.12%	3,836	31.39%	60	0.49%
1932	6,924	48.98%	7,079	50.07%	134	0.95%
1936	7,392	47.84%	8,011	51.85%	48	0.31%
1940	8,530	55.21%	6,921	44.79%	0	0.00%
1944	7,963	59.88%	5,336	40.12%	0	0.00%
1948	6,849	54.62%	5,675	45.26%	16	0.13%
1952	8,568	62.15%	5,219	37.85%	0	0.00%
1956	8,397	63.50%	4,826	36.50%	0	0.00%
1960	8,948	62.26%	5,423	37.74%	0	0.00%
1964	5,985	45.12%	7,281	54.88%	0	0.00%
1968	6,489	51.81%	3,828	30.56%	2,208	17.63%
1972	8,524	69.72%	3,464	28.33%	238	1.95%
1976	6,853	51.41%	6,327	47.46%	151	1.13%
1980	7,359	59.35%	4,363	35.19%	678	5.47%
1984	9,000	69.90%	3,784	29.39%	91	0.71%
1988	8,776	66.60%	4,278	32.46%	124	0.94%
1992	7,020	46.06%	4,866	31.92%	3,356	22.02%
1996	7,102	48.40%	5,837	39.78%	1,735	11.82%
2000	9,728	62.98%	5,328	34.49%	391	2.53%
2004	12,211	66.07%	6,194	33.52%	76	0.41%
2008	11,907	61.92%	6,856	35.65%	468	2.43%
2012	11,413	63.83%	6,054	33.86%	412	2.30%
2016	14,020	75.43%	3,773	20.30%	795	4.28%
2020	15,678	79.68%	3,799	19.31%	199	1.01%
2024	16,269	81.32%	3,609	18.04%	127	0.63%

United States Senate election results for Highland County, Ohio1
Year	Republican		Democratic		Third party(ies)	
Year	No.	%	No.	%	No.	%
2024	14,884	75.45%	4,152	21.05%	692	3.51%

== Education ==
=== School districts ===
Highland County is home to five school districts: Greenfield Exempted Village Schools in Greenfield, Hillsboro City Schools in Hillsboro, Fairfield Local School District in Leesburg, Bright Local School District in Mowrystown, and Lynchburg-Clay Local School District in Lynchburg.

Additionally, these districts have territory in the county: Eastern Local School District, East Clinton Local School District, and Adams County/Ohio Valley Local School District.

== Transportation ==
=== Airports ===
The Highland County Airport is located three nautical miles (3.5 mi; 5.6 km) southeast of Hillsboro's central business district.

=== Major highways ===
- US 50
- US 62
- SR 28
- SR 32
- SR 41
- SR 72
- SR 73
- SR 124
- SR 131
- SR 134
- SR 135
- SR 136
- SR 138
- SR 247
- SR 286
- SR 321
- SR 506
- SR 753
- SR 771
- SR 785

== Libraries ==
The Highland County District Library is the public library system serving Highland County, Ohio. The main library is in Hillsboro, with four branches located in Greenfield, Leesburg, Lynchburg, and Rocky Fork. The library is a member of the SEO Consortium which allows patrons access to over 6.9 million items owned by member libraries.

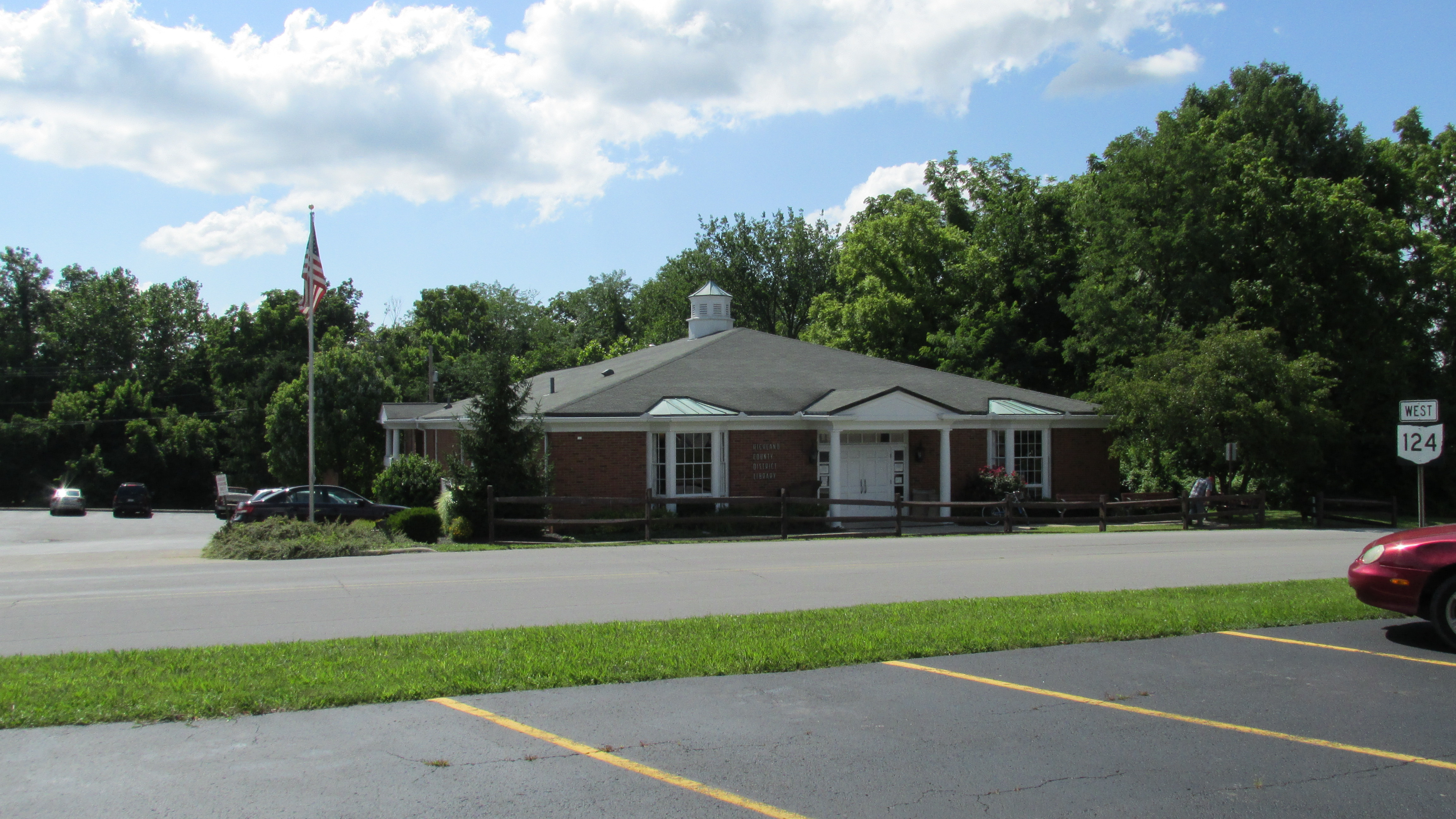
Hillsboro Library

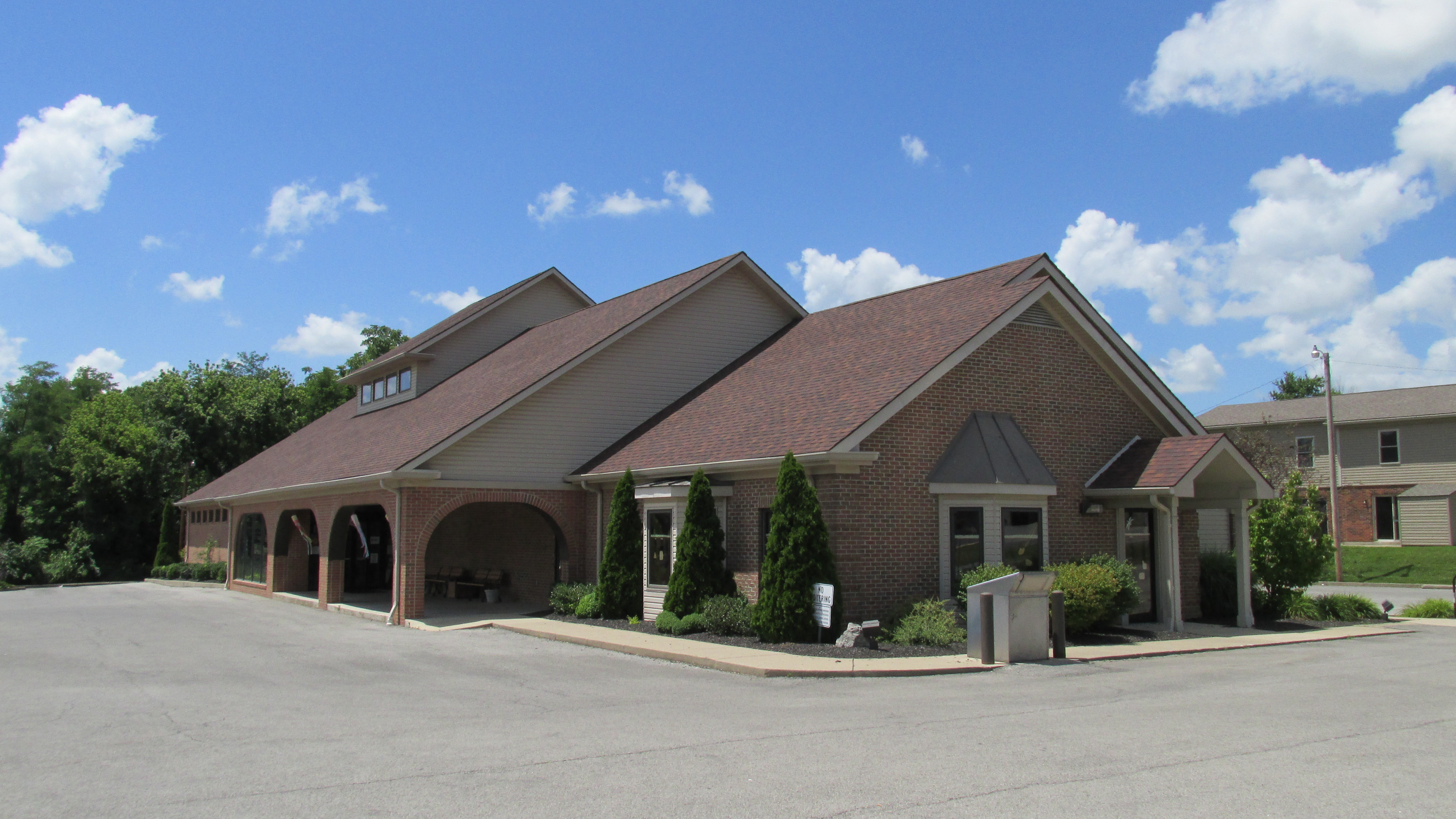
Greenfield Library

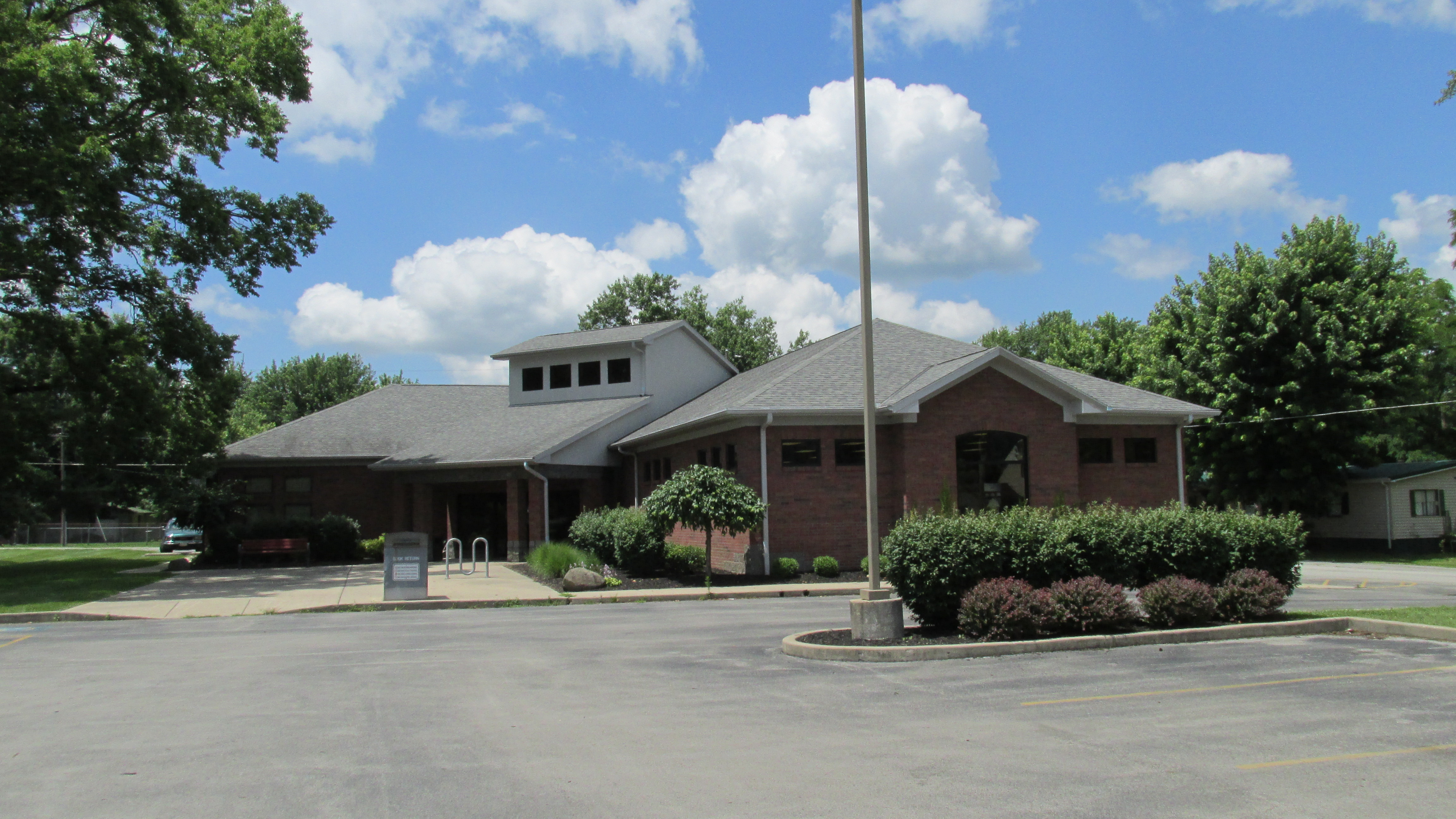
Leesburg Library

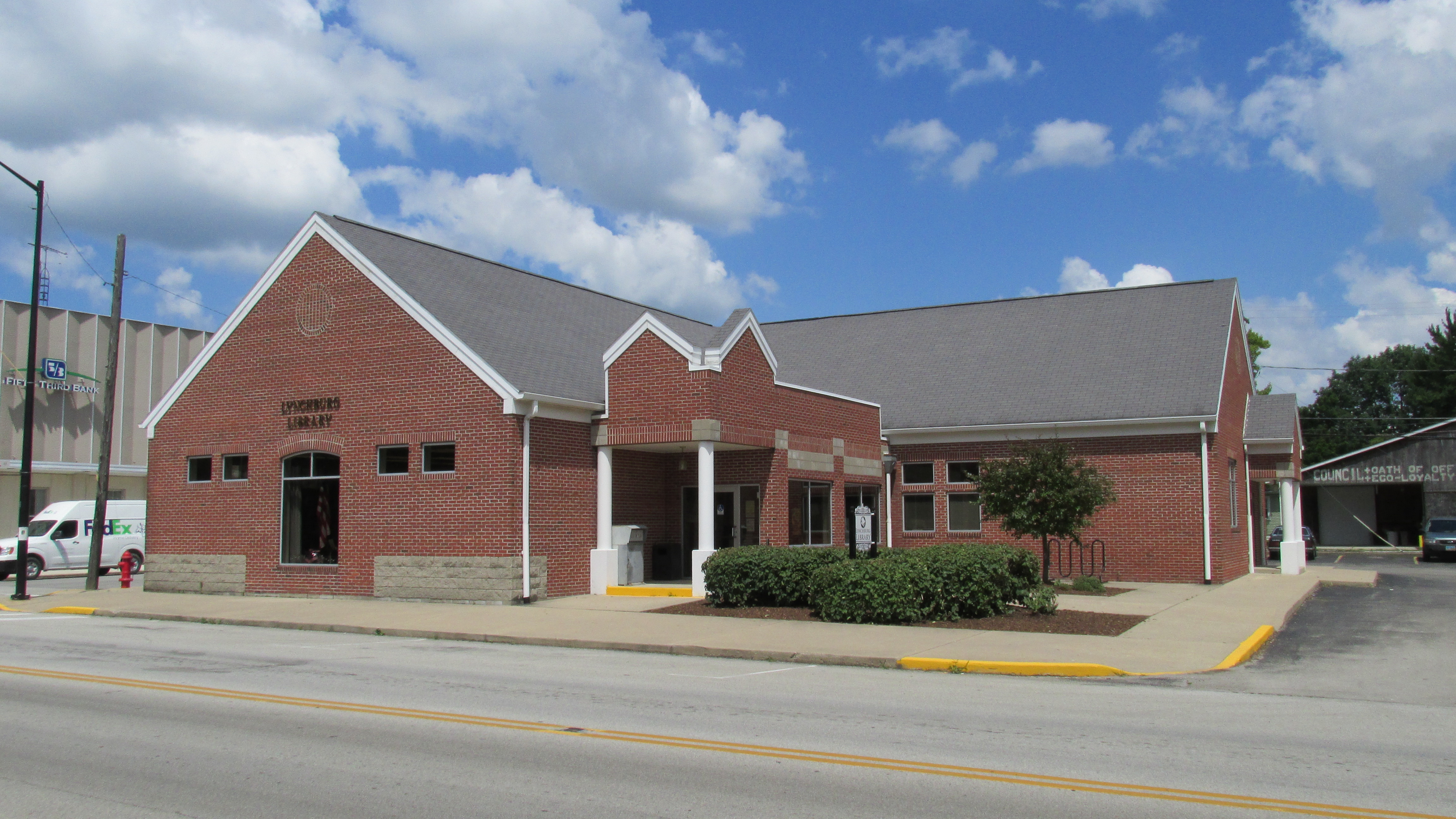
Lynchburg Library

== Recreation ==
There are currently several recreational areas in Highland County. There is Rocky Fork State Park which is located 5 miles east of Hillsboro. It provides opportunities to go camping, fishing, boating, swimming, hunting, putt-putt, and disc golf amongst other activities.

There is also Paint Creek State Park located 13 miles east of Hillsboro. Paint Creek offers many of the same activities as Rocky Fork but also offers horse riding, mountain biking, and winter recreational activities.

Fort Hill State Memorial is a memorial built by the Hopewell people that is located 10 miles southeast of Hillsboro and is believed to be around 2000 years old.

Fallsville Wildlife Area is located 4 miles north of Hillsboro. It offers fishing, hunting, hiking, and wildlife watching.

== Non-profits ==
Habitat for Humanity of Highland County was established in 2000, and has since built three homes: one on Johnson St. in Hillsboro and two on 2nd St. in Greenfield. Highland County Habitat is a locally run affiliate of Habitat for Humanity International, a nonprofit, ecumenical Christian housing organization. Habitat for Humanity works in partnership with people in need to build and renovate decent, affordable housing. The houses then are sold to those in need at no profit and with no interest charged.

Highlands Sanctuary is a chain of nature preserves centered in Highland County and owned by an organization of the same name.

== Communities ==
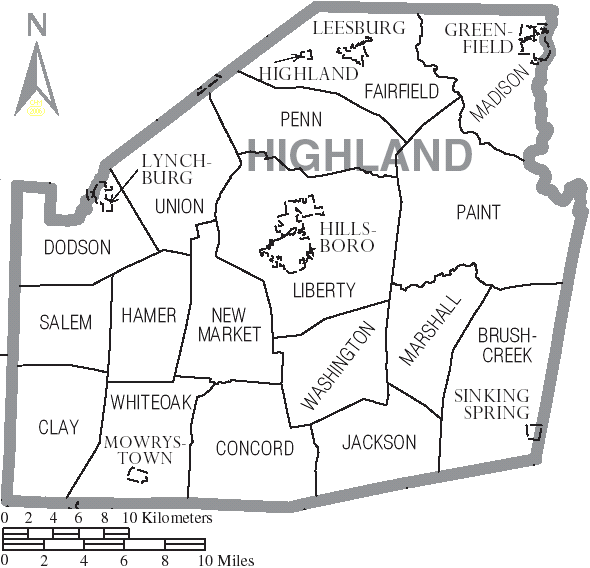
Map of Highland County, Ohio with Municipal and Township Labels

=== City ===
- Hillsboro (county seat)

=== Villages ===
- Greenfield
- Highland
- Leesburg
- Lynchburg
- Mowrystown
- Sardinia
- Sinking Spring

=== Townships ===
- Brushcreek
- Clay
- Concord
- Dodson
- Fairfield
- Hamer
- Jackson
- Liberty
- Madison
- Marshall
- New Market
- Paint
- Penn
- Salem
- Union
- Washington
- Whiteoak

=== Census-designated places ===
- Buford
- Highland Holiday
- Rocky Fork Point

=== Unincorporated communities ===
- Allensburg
- Belfast
- Berrysville
- Boston
- Bridges
- Carmel
- Dodsonville
- East Danville
- Elmville
- Fairfax
- Folsom
- Hoagland
- Hollowtown
- Marshall
- New Market
- New Petersburg
- Pricetown
- Rainsboro
- Samantha
- Sugar Tree Ridge
- Taylorsville

East Monroe

== See also ==
- Fort Hill State Memorial
- National Register of Historic Places listings in Highland County, Ohio
- Highland County Courthouse
- Rocky Fork State Park
- Paint Creek State Park
