= Rocky Fork (Crooked River tributary) =

Stream in the American state of Missouri

Coordinates: 39.37223°N 94.04272°W

Rocky Fork is a stream in Ray County in the U.S. state of Missouri. It is a tributary of the Crooked River.

Rocky Fork was so named on account of the rocky character of the stream.

== See also ==
- List of rivers of Missouri
