= New Petersburg, Ohio =

Unincorporated community in Ohio, U.S.

Coordinates: 39°15′44″N 83°26′42″W

New Petersburg is an unincorporated community in Highland County, in the U.S. state of Ohio.

== History ==
New Petersburg was laid out in 1817. A post office called New Petersburgh was established in 1829, the name was changed to New Petersburg in 1893, and the post office closed in 1932.
