= Fort Hill State Memorial =

Archaeological site in Ohio, United States

- Fort Hill State Park
- U.S. National Register of Historic Places
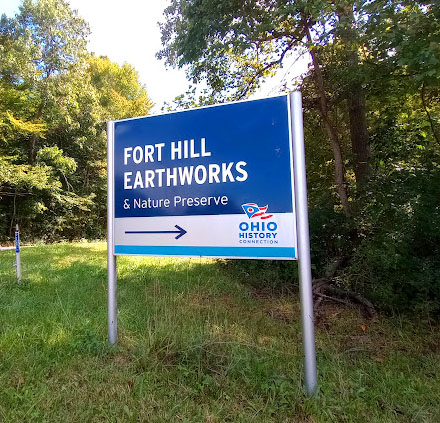
- Entrance sign on SR41

- Location within Ohio
- Nearest city: Sinking Spring, Ohio, USA
- Coordinates: 39.1131°N 83.4063°W
- Area: 400 acres (160 ha)
- NRHP reference No.: 70000500
- Added to NRHP: November 10, 1970

Fort Hill State Memorial is a Native American earthwork located in Highland County, Ohio, United States. Built by the Hopewell culture, it is maintained by the Arc of Appalachia Preserve System and the Ohio History Connection.

The earthwork, built about 2,000 years ago, is a walled enclosure made of soil on top of a flat summit. It is 500 feet (150 m) higher than nearby portions of Ohio Brush Creek and 800 feet (240 m) higher than the Ohio River. It was made by the Hopewell people. It is over 1 1/2 miles in circumference, enclosing 35.3 acres (14.3 ha). Thirty-nine "man-made openings" occur throughout the enclosure: thirty-six that are verified as being made by Indians and three others still unknown as to how they were made. The wall is 6 to 15 feet (1.8 to 4.6 m) high and its total length is 8,619 feet (2,627 m). It is 30 feet (9.1 m) wide at its base in most areas. Archaeologists believe it was not used as a fort, but instead as a religious site.

In 1846, it was excavated by Ephraim George Squier and Edwin Hamilton Davis. It was featured in their book Ancient Monuments of the Mississippi Valley, which was published in 1848.

Fort Hill State Memorial contains excellent outcrops of Silurian, Devonian, and Mississippian sedimentary bedrock and a natural bridge. The site is also an example of glacial stream reversal. It was named a National Natural Landmark in 1974.

== Gallery ==
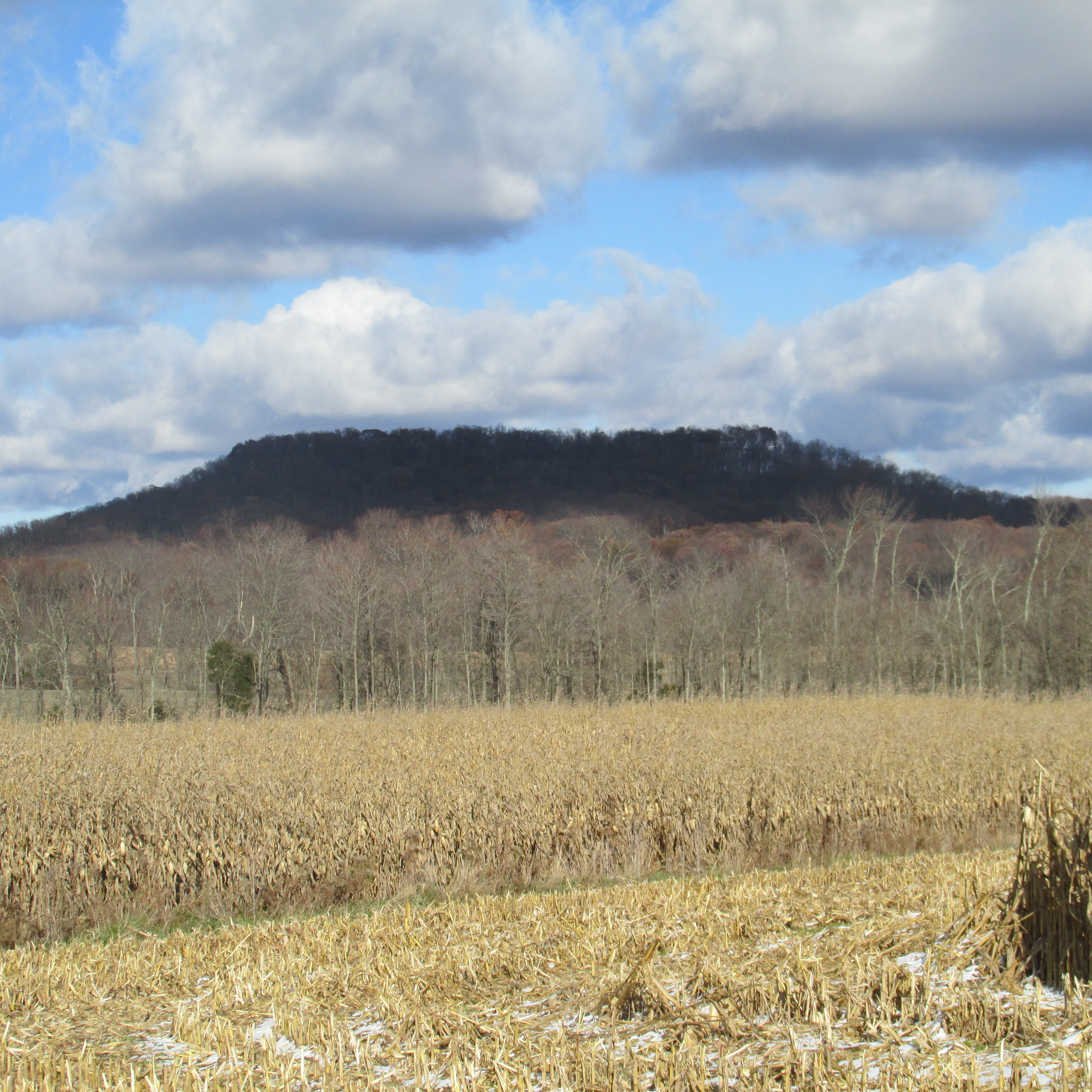
Fort Hill viewed from a distance

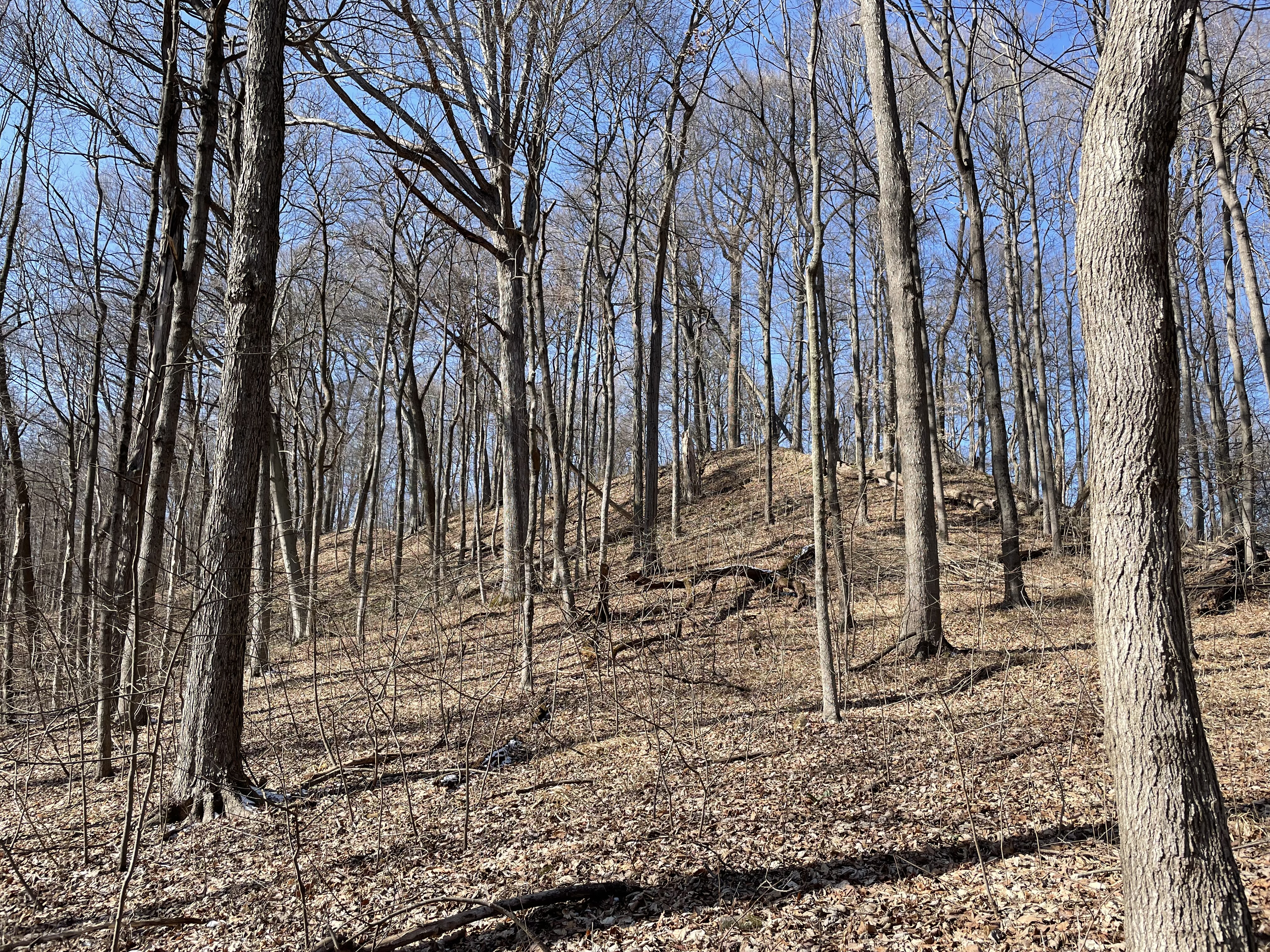
Looking up from the base of the hill - entryway visible on right

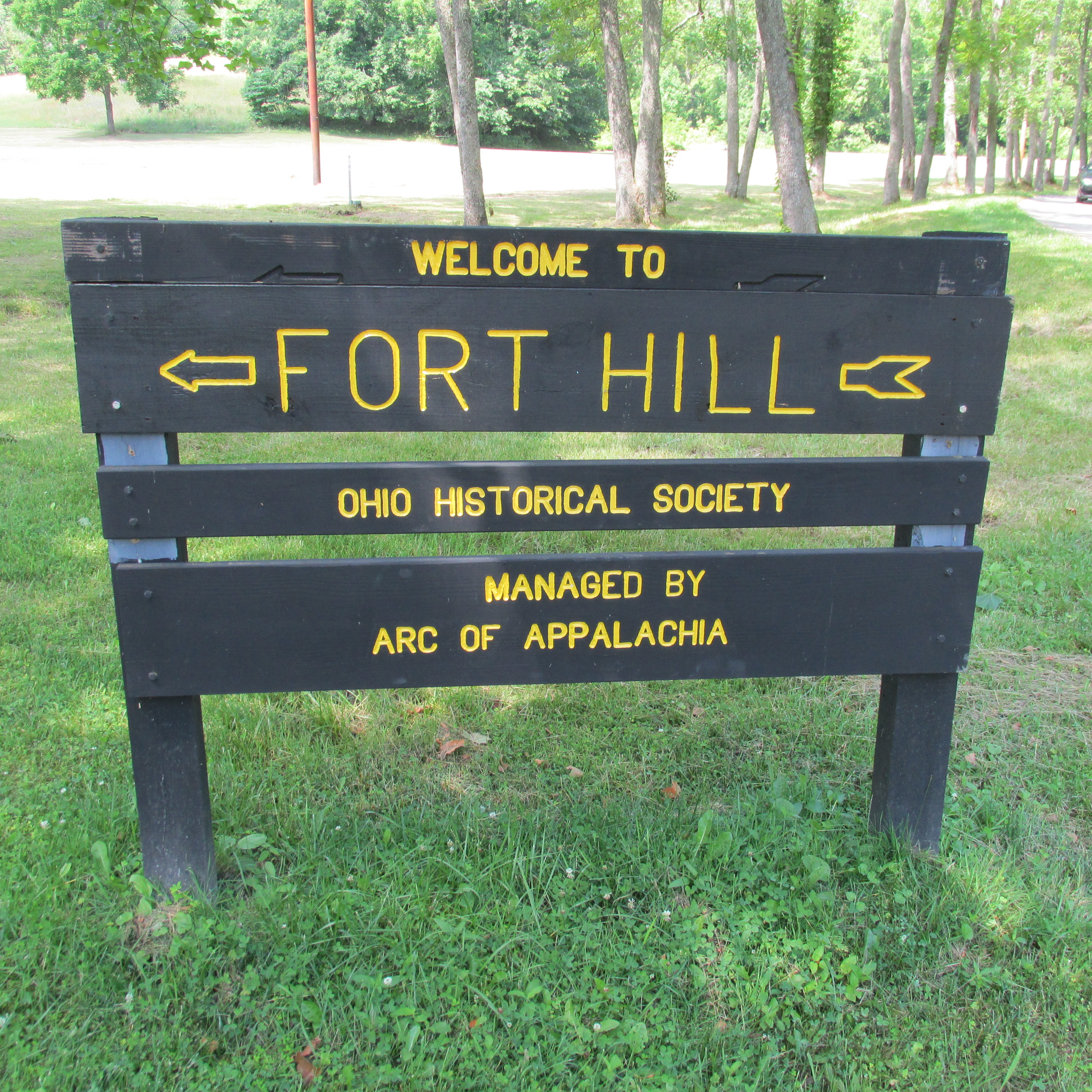
Entrance to Fort Hill

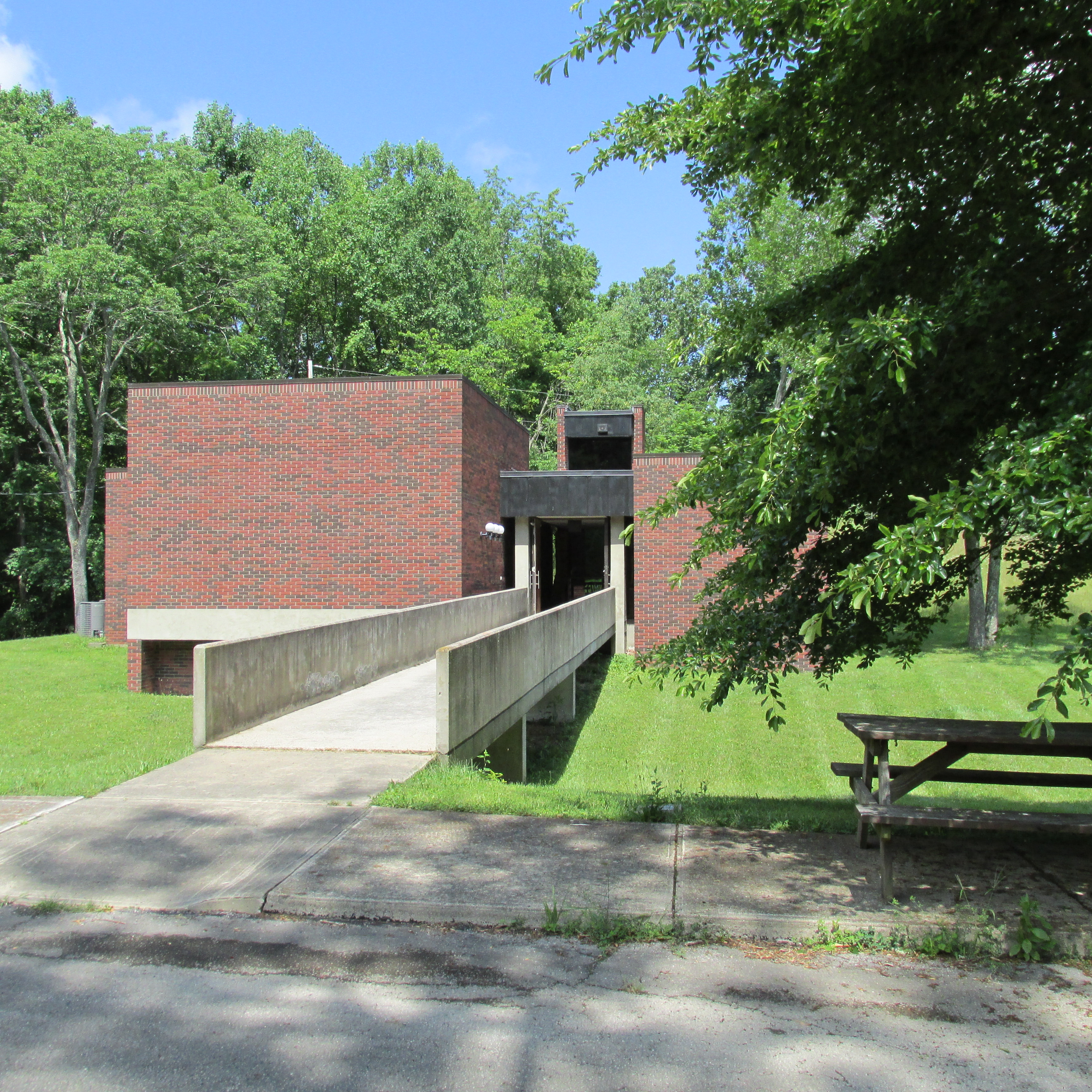
Fort Hill museum. Constructed and dedicated in August 1968

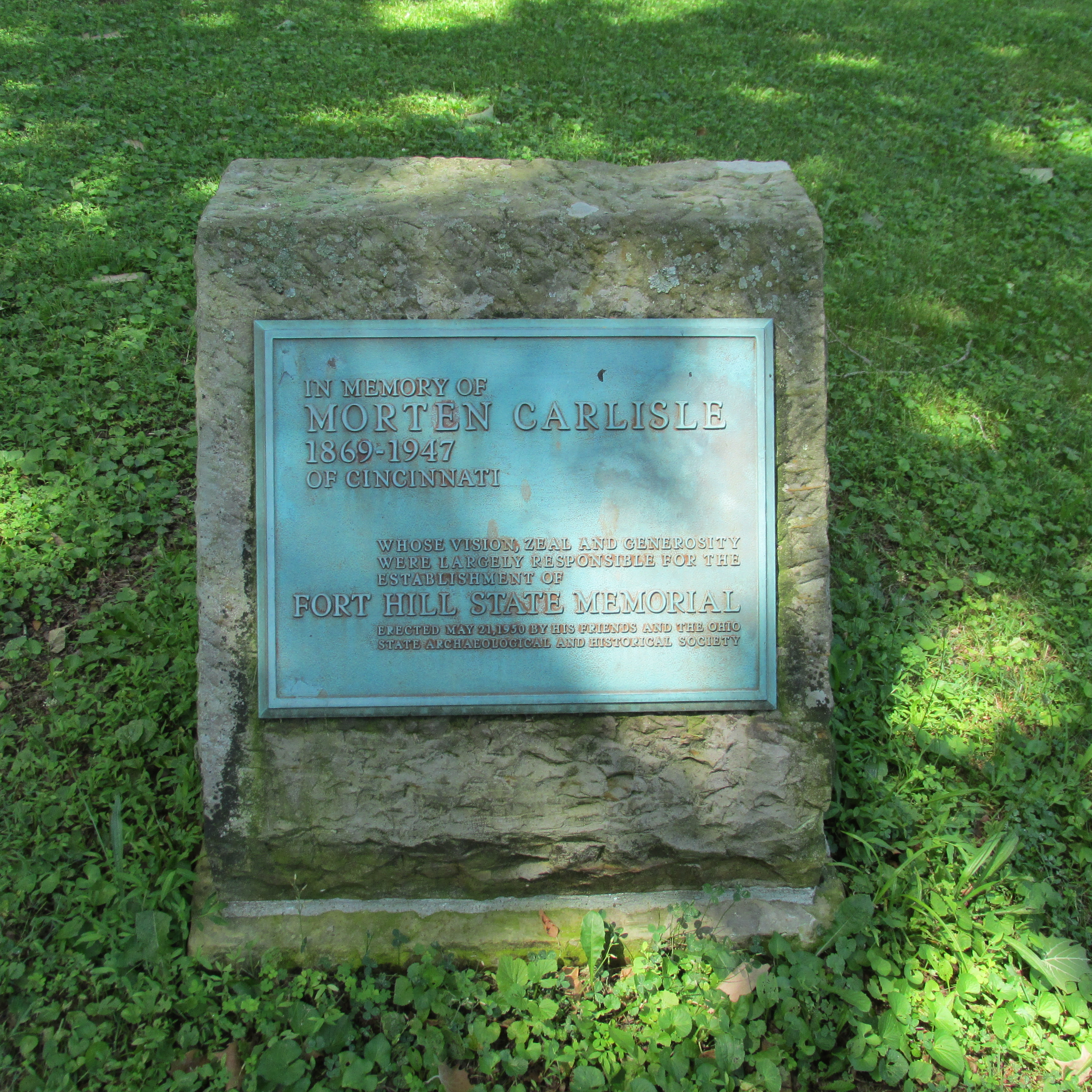
Monument to Morten Carlisle for his large responsibility for the establishment of Fort Hill State Memorial. Erected on May 21, 1950.

== See also ==
- Rocky Fork State Park
- Paint Creek State Park
