= Highland County Courthouse (Ohio) =

Local government building in the United States

- U.S. National Register of Historic Places
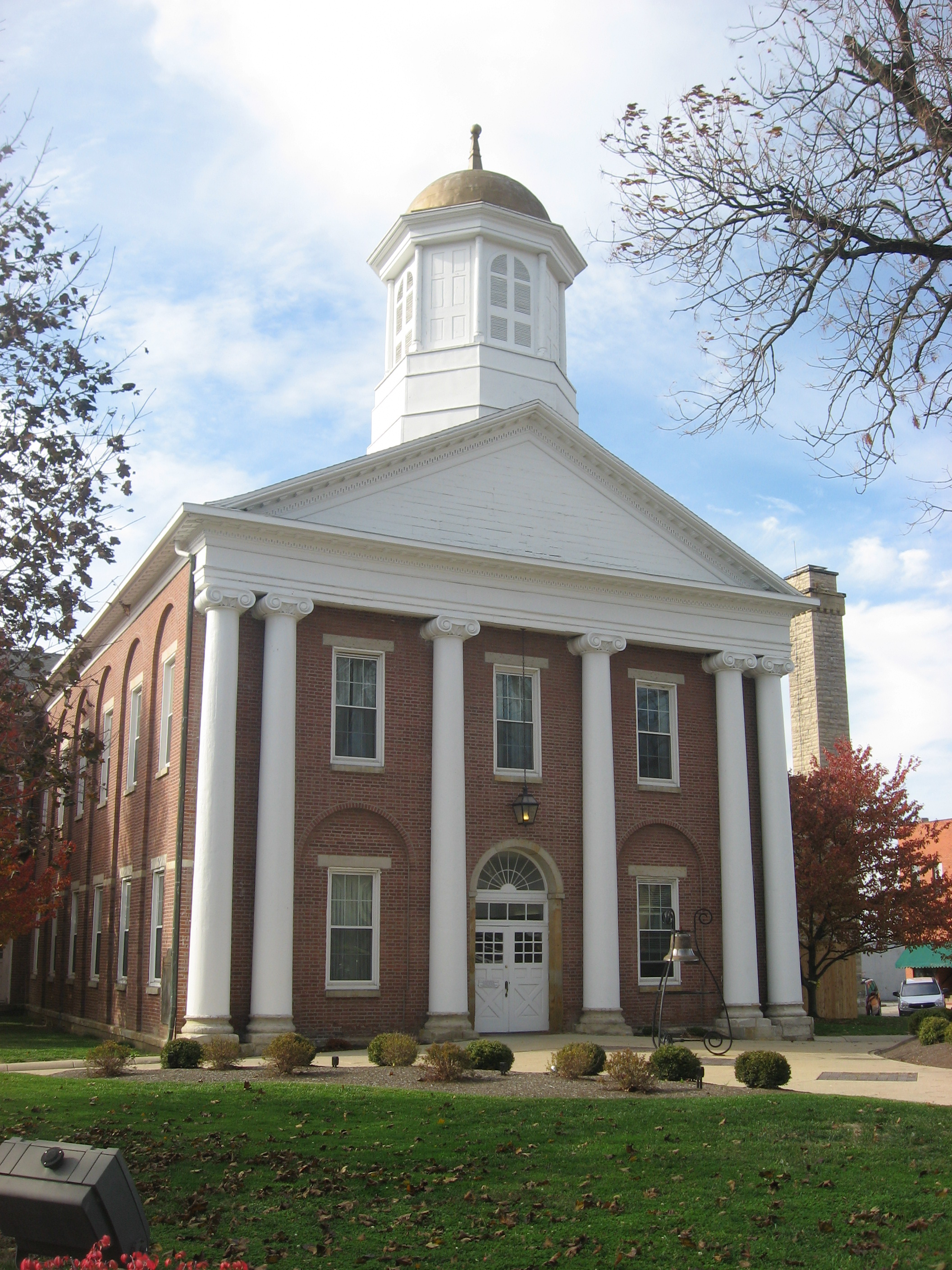
- Front of the courthouse

- Location within Ohio Location within the United States
- Location: Main (US 50) and High (US 62) Streets, Hillsboro, Ohio
- Coordinates: 39°12′9″N 83°36′43″W
- Area: 0.8 acres (0.32 ha)
- Built: 1833
- Architect: Arthur, Pleasant
- Architectural style: Greek Revival, Federal
- NRHP reference No.: 78002087
- Added to NRHP: August 24, 1978

The Highland County Courthouse is located in Hillsboro, Ohio. The courthouse was placed on the National Register on August 24, 1978. This building has served as the courthouse of Highland County since its opening in 1834 and is the oldest courthouse in continuous use in Ohio.

== Gallery ==
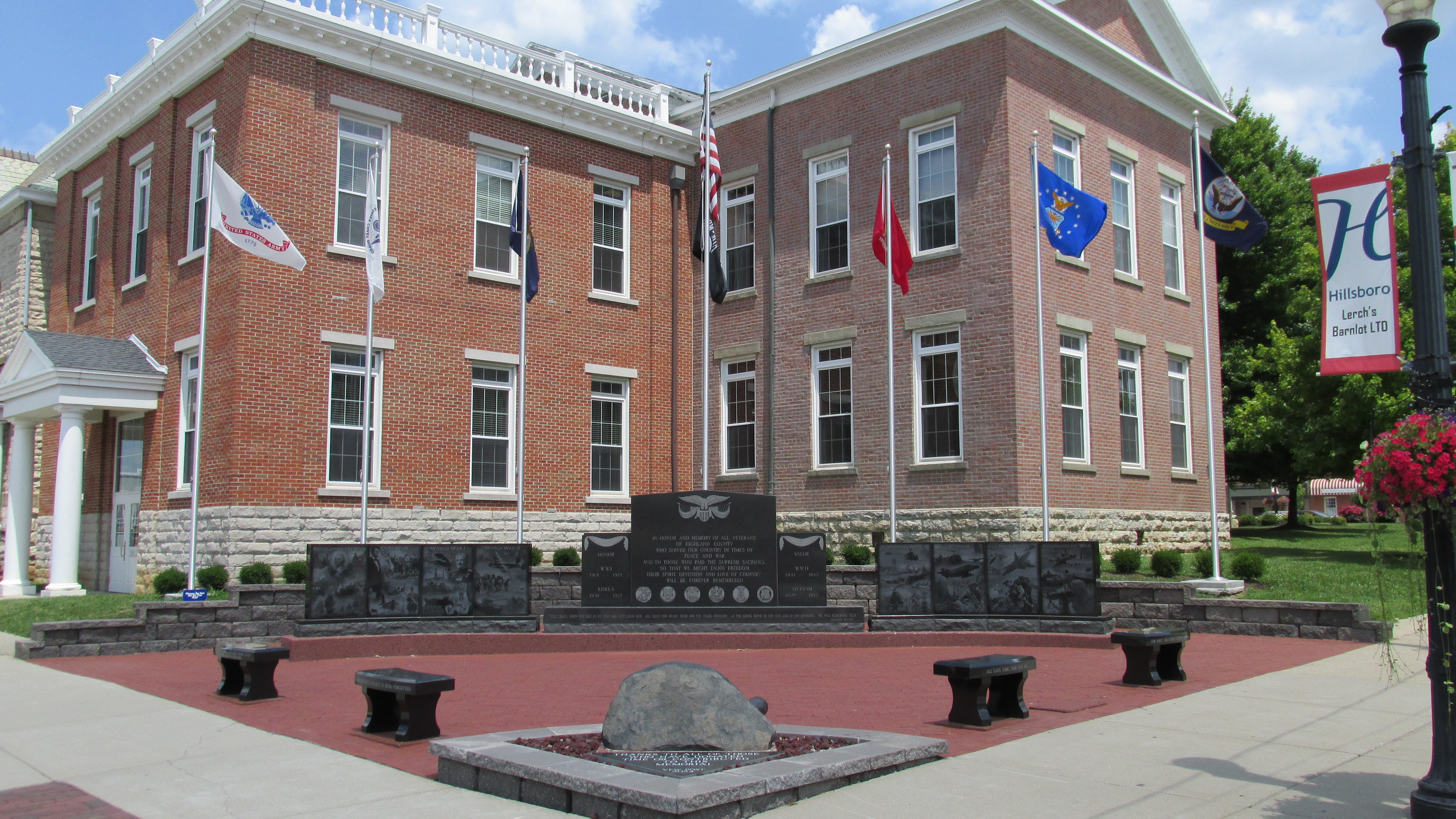
Veterans Memorial dedicated in 2012.

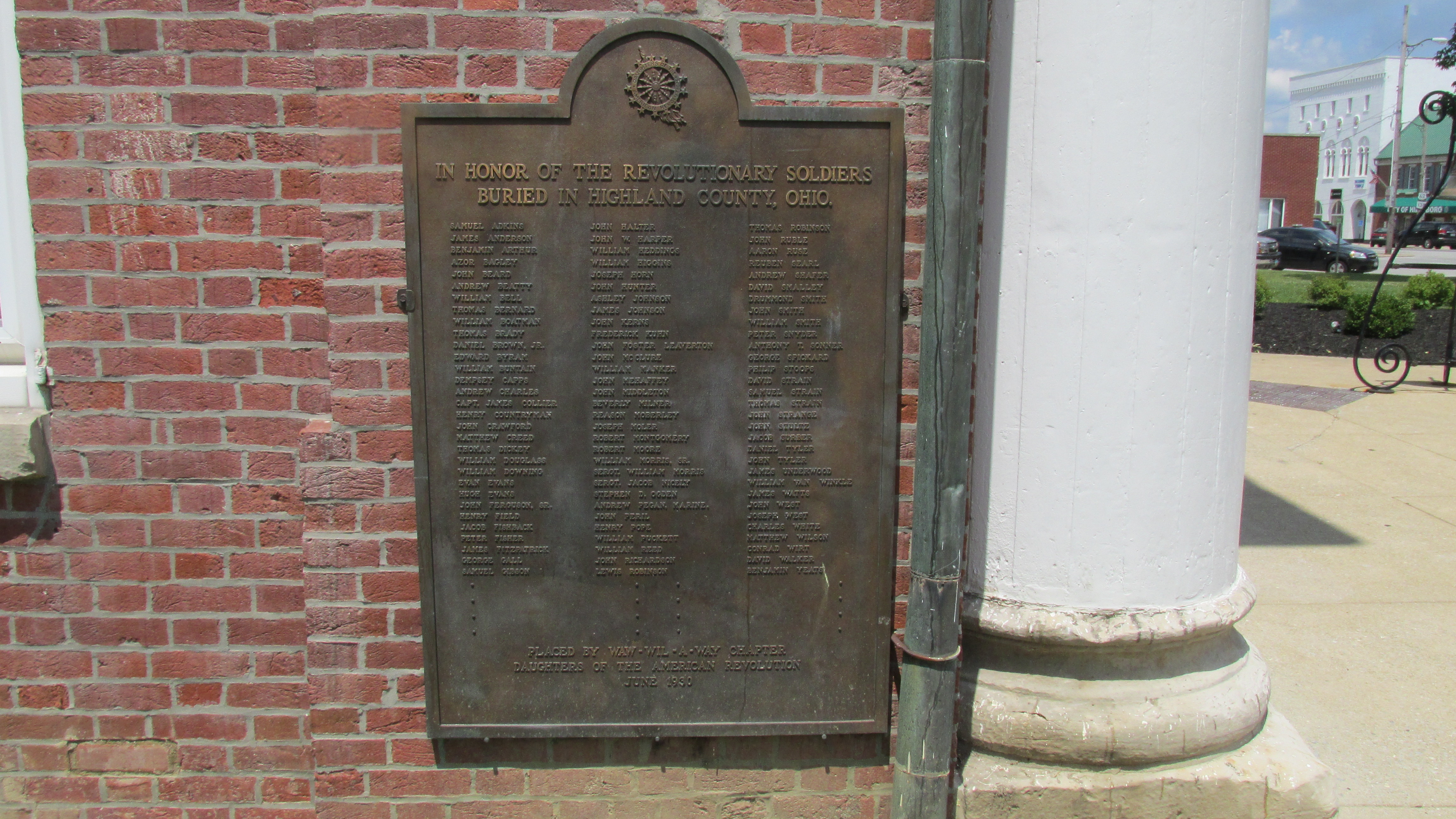
Plaque dedicated to 93 Revolutionary War soldiers buried in Highland County. Unveiled on July 4, 1930.

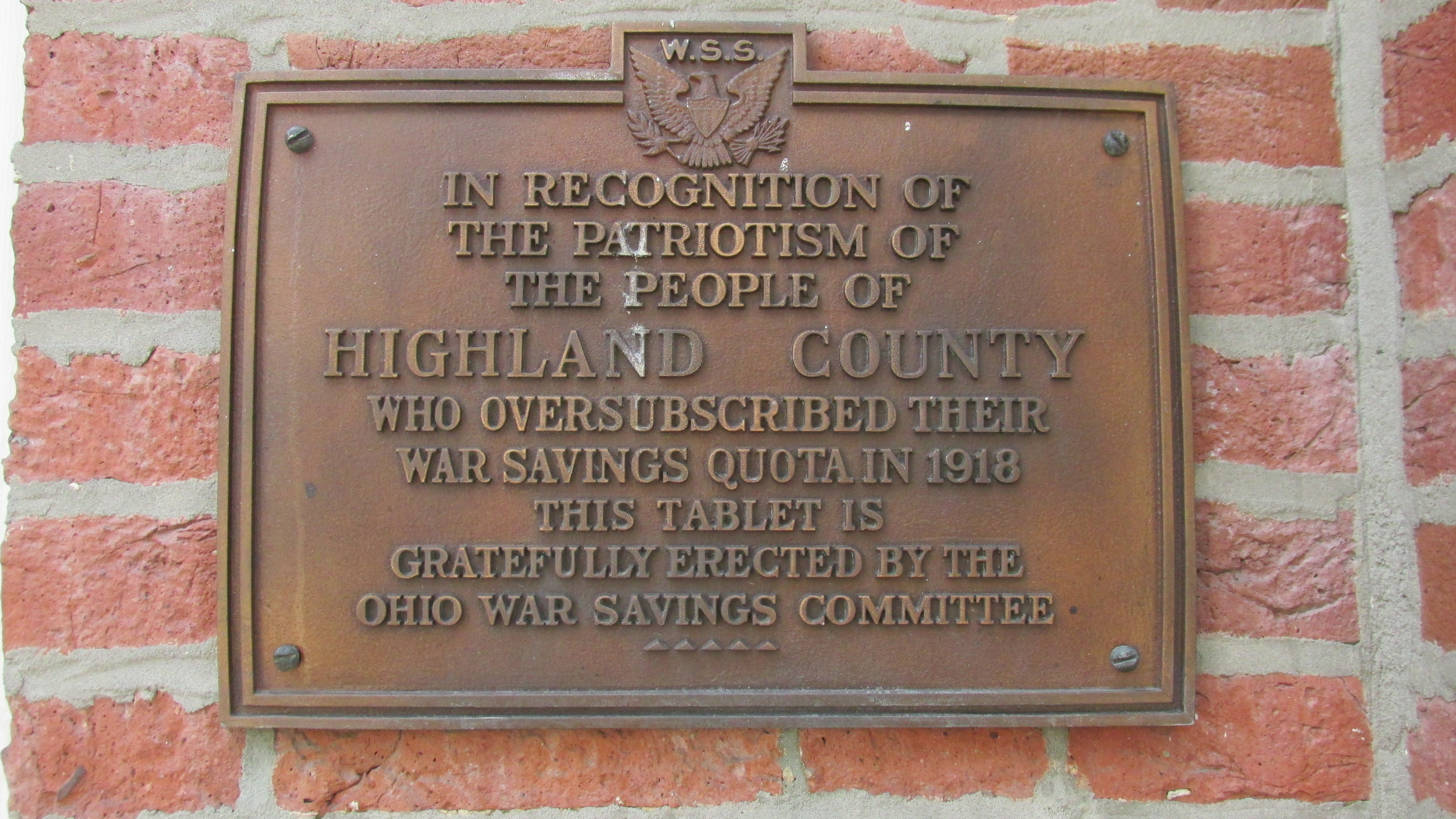
Plaque dedicated to Highland County War Bond Drive in World War I. Unveiled on May 31, 1919.

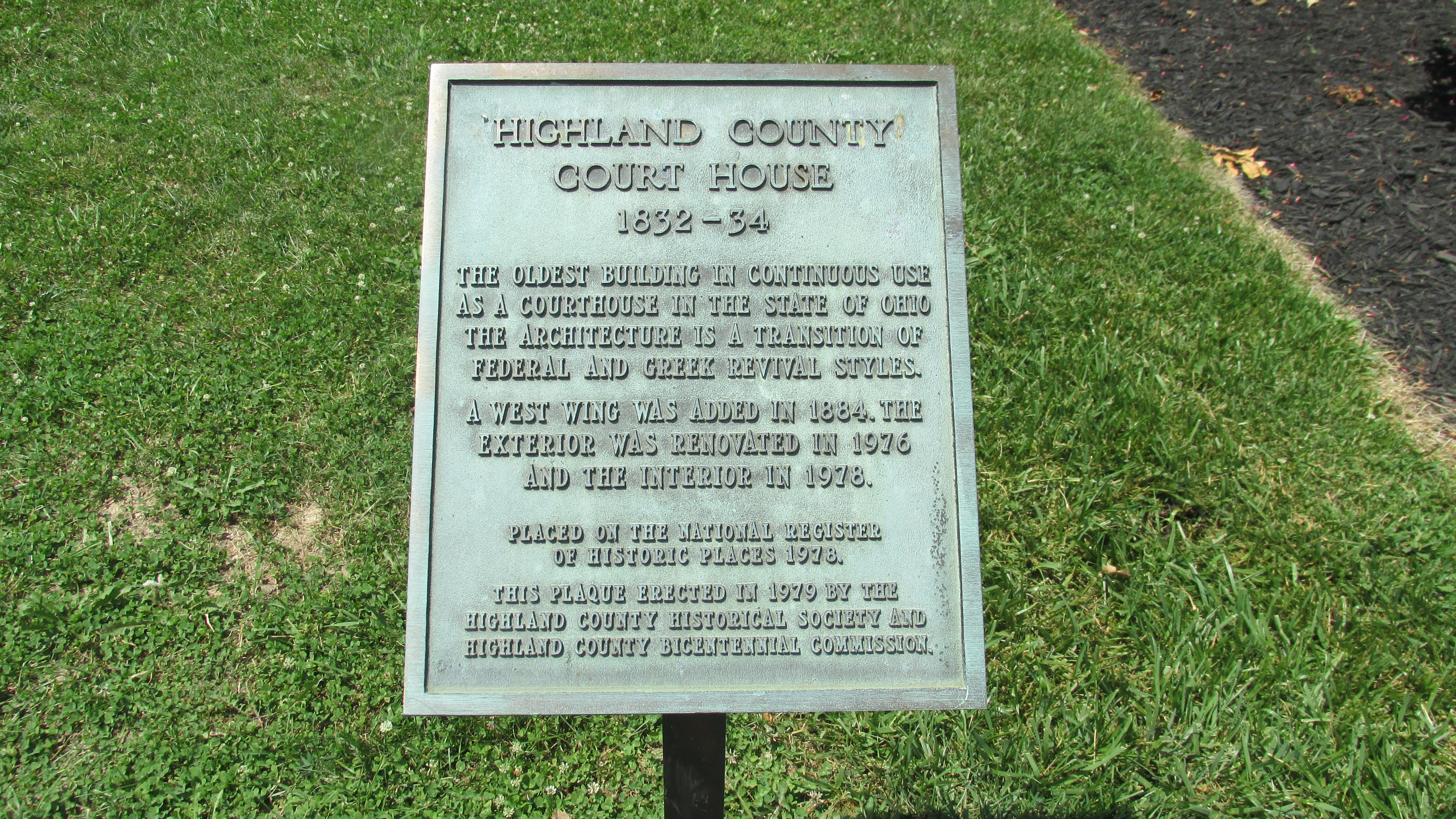
Plaque dedicated to the oldest court house in Ohio. Unveiled on October 9, 1979.

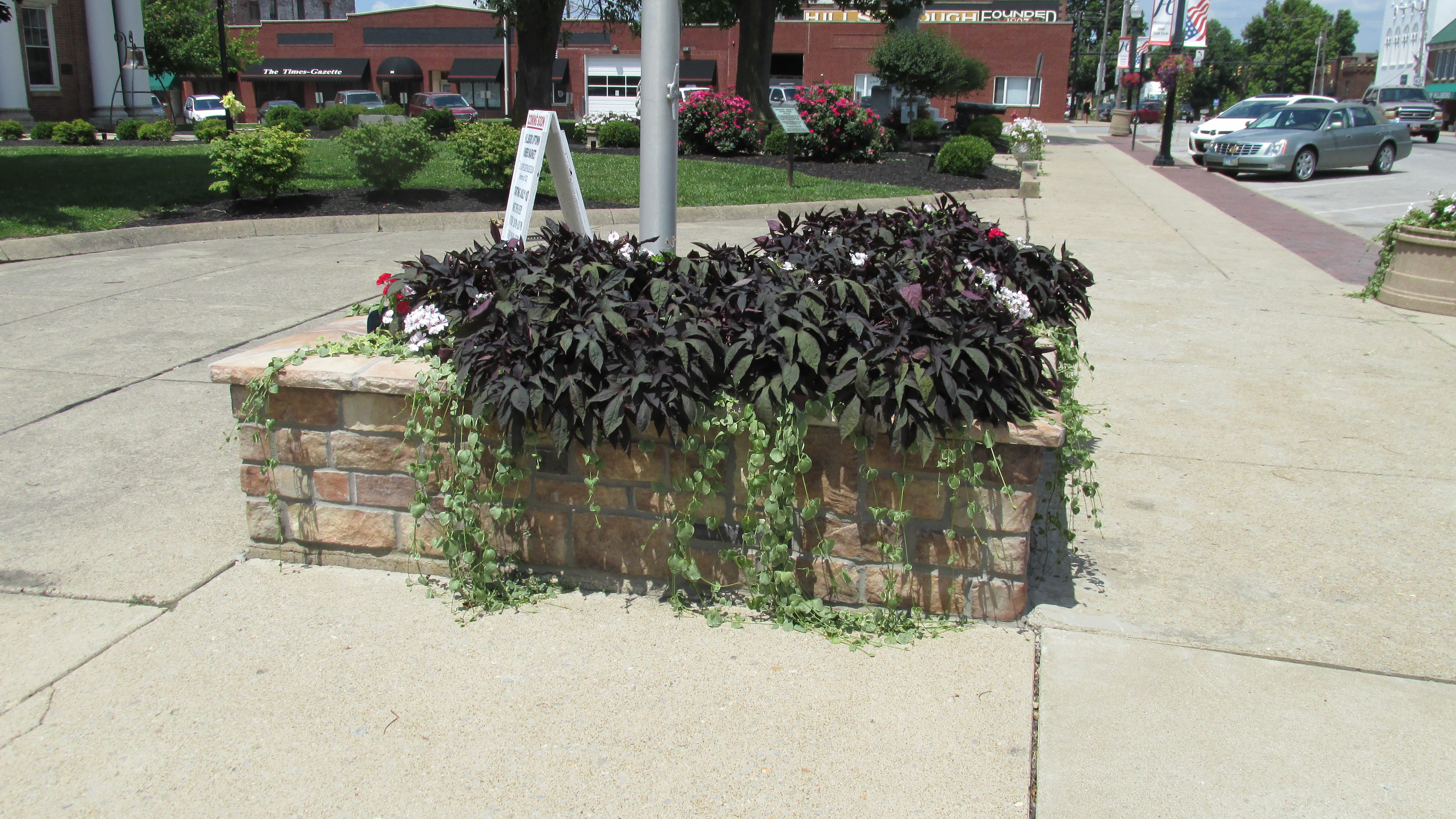
Highland County court house beautification project. Constructed in 1965.

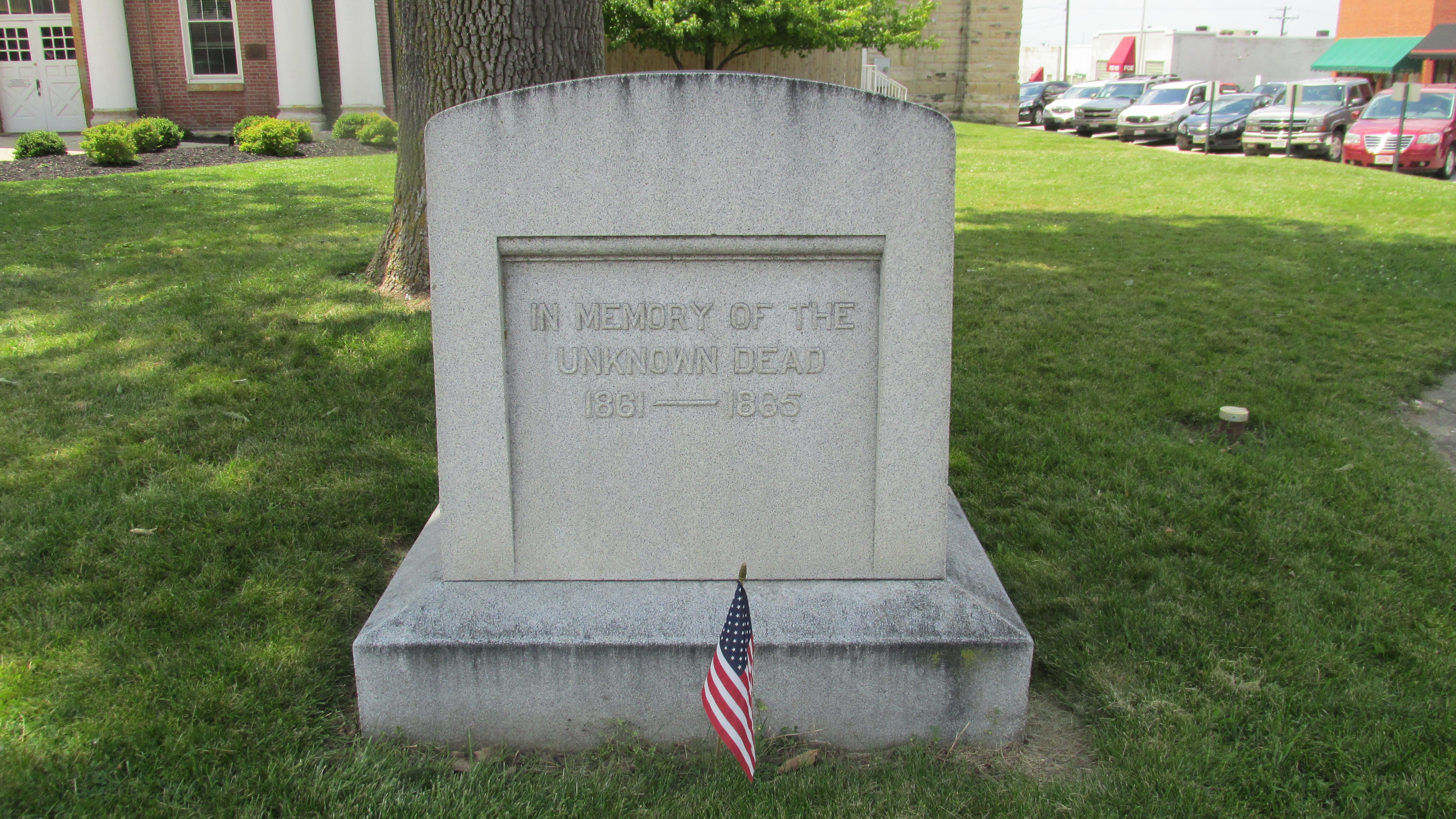
Monument dedicated to the unknown dead of the Civil War. Unveiled on November 28, 1908.

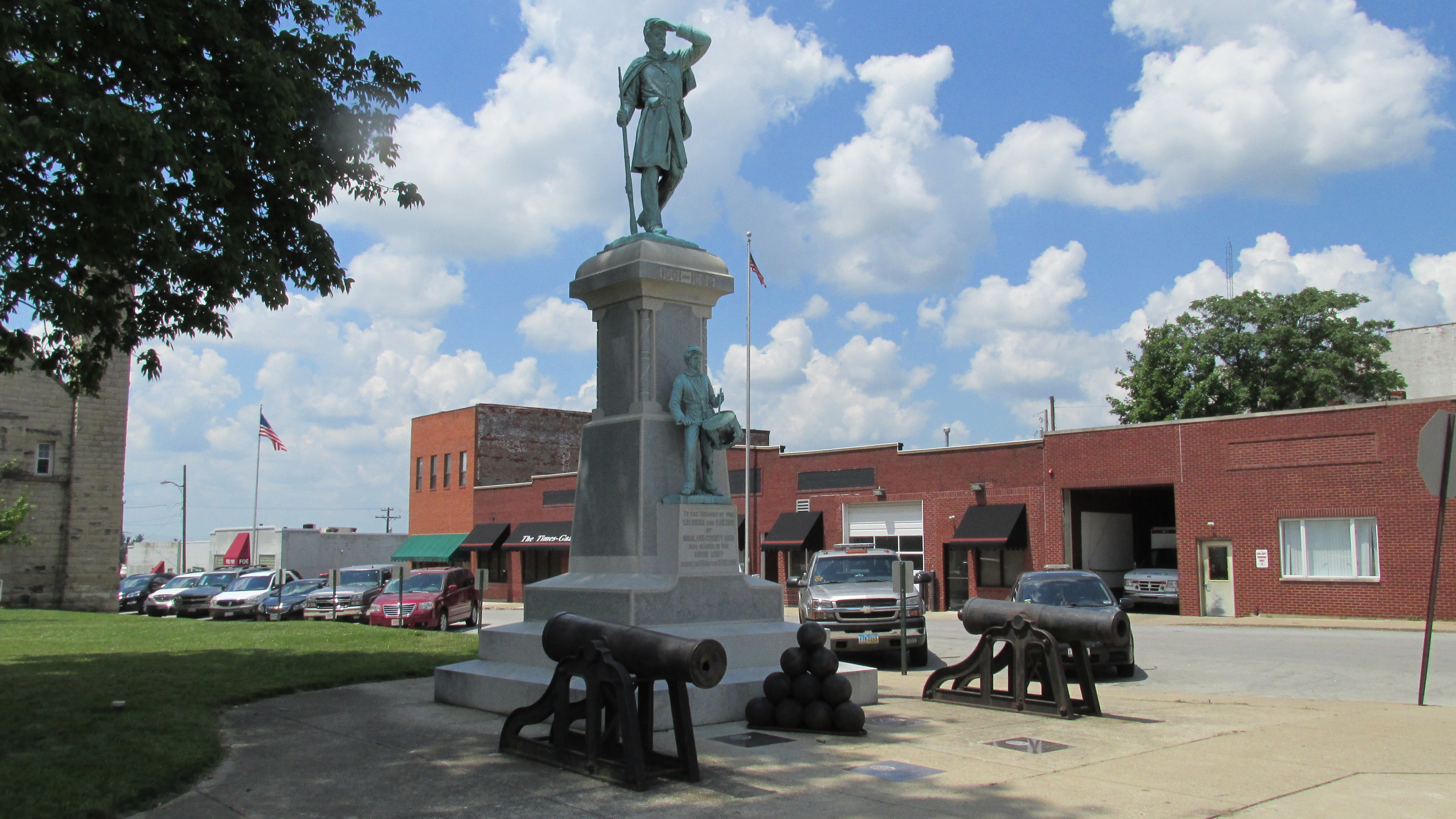
Monument dedicated to the soldiers from Highland County who fought for the North in the Civil War. Unveiled on November 17, 1897.

== History ==
Highland County was established in 1805 with special sessions of the courts meeting in New Market. Plans for a courthouse were accepted in 1807, with John Shields having the winning entry. The structure was built in Hillsboro, the new county seat, and was a two-story brick building with a rectangular footprint. Lack of room and foundation problems led the county to plan a replacement.

This replacement was submitted by Pleasant Arthur and was an example of Greek Revival architecture.

== Exterior ==
The red brick structure was originally laid out in a long rectangular plan, but additions on either side were built in 1883. The front of the building has a central entrance with a transom and fanlight above the large wooden double doors. Windows to either side of the door are rectangular in shape and are located within a recessed arch. Above each window and the door are rectangular windows with a lantern hung above the entrance. Ionic columns line the facade and support a pediment. A drum rises from the pitched roof and supports a lantern with arched vents and capped by a small dome. A weathervane tops the tower.
