= Carmel, Ohio =

Unincorporated community in Ohio, U.S.

Coordinates: 39°10′01″N 83°24′30″W

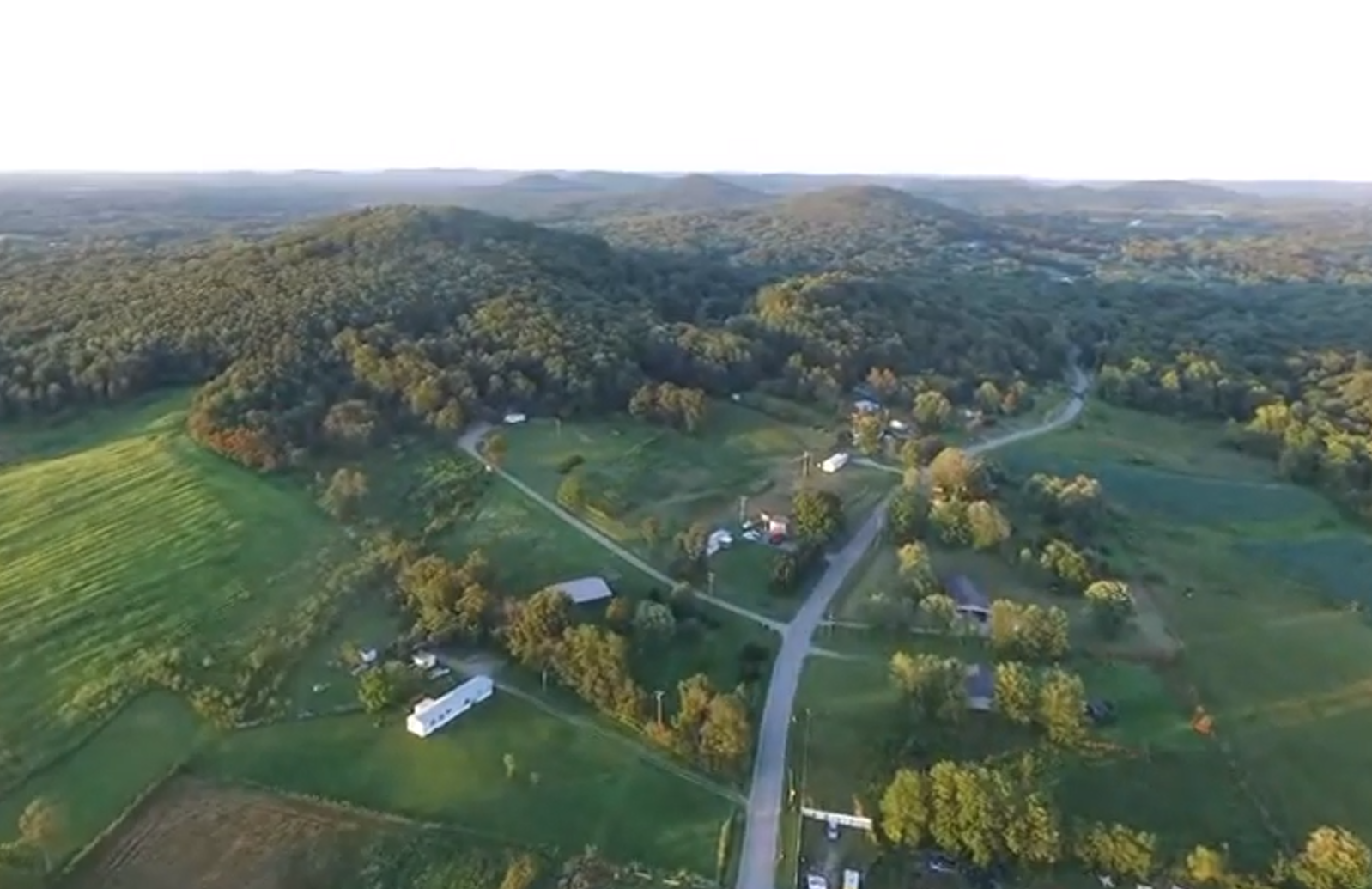
Carmel, Ohio

Carmel is an unincorporated community in Highland County, in the U.S. state of Ohio. Carmel, Ohio is the birthplace of the Carmelites, a distinct community often labelled as a subgroup of Melungeons.

== History ==
A post office was established at Carmel in 1856, and remained in operation until it was discontinued in 1913. The community took its name from the local Mount Carmel church.

== See also ==
- Carmel Melungeons
