= Rainsboro, Ohio =

Coordinates: 39.22007°N 83.42214°W

- Unincorporated community
- Seal
- Interactive map of Rainsboro, Ohio
- Country: United States
- State: Ohio
- County: Highland
- Township: Paint
- Time zone: Eastern

Rainsboro is an unincorporated community in Paint Township, Highland County, Ohio, United States.

== History ==
Rainsboro was named for John Rains, the original owner of the town site. A post office was established at Rainsboro in 1893, and remained in operation until it was discontinued in 1966.

== Notable person ==
Joseph B. Foraker, 37th Governor of Ohio, was born near Rainsboro in 1846.

== Gallery ==
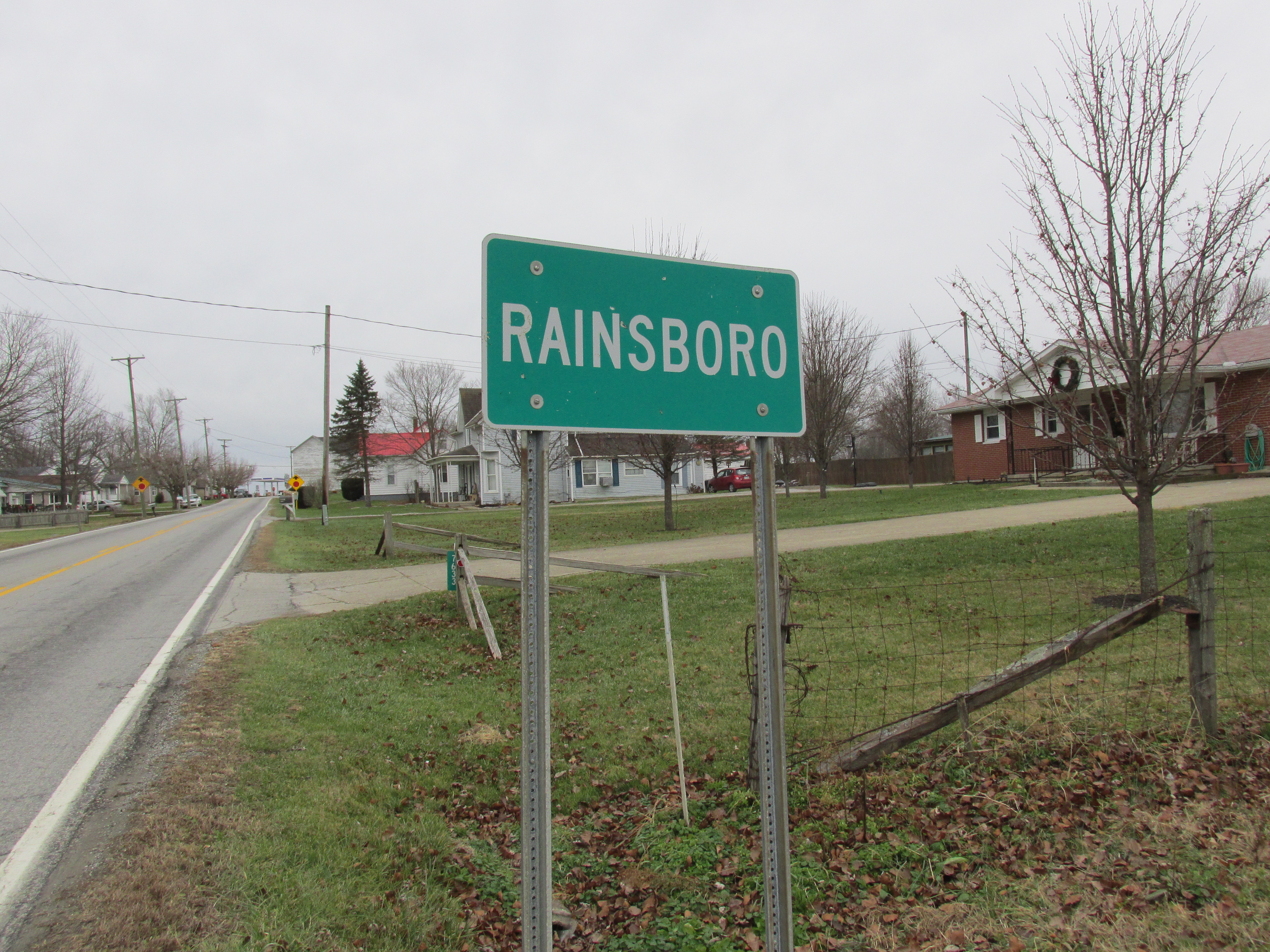
Rainsboro community sign

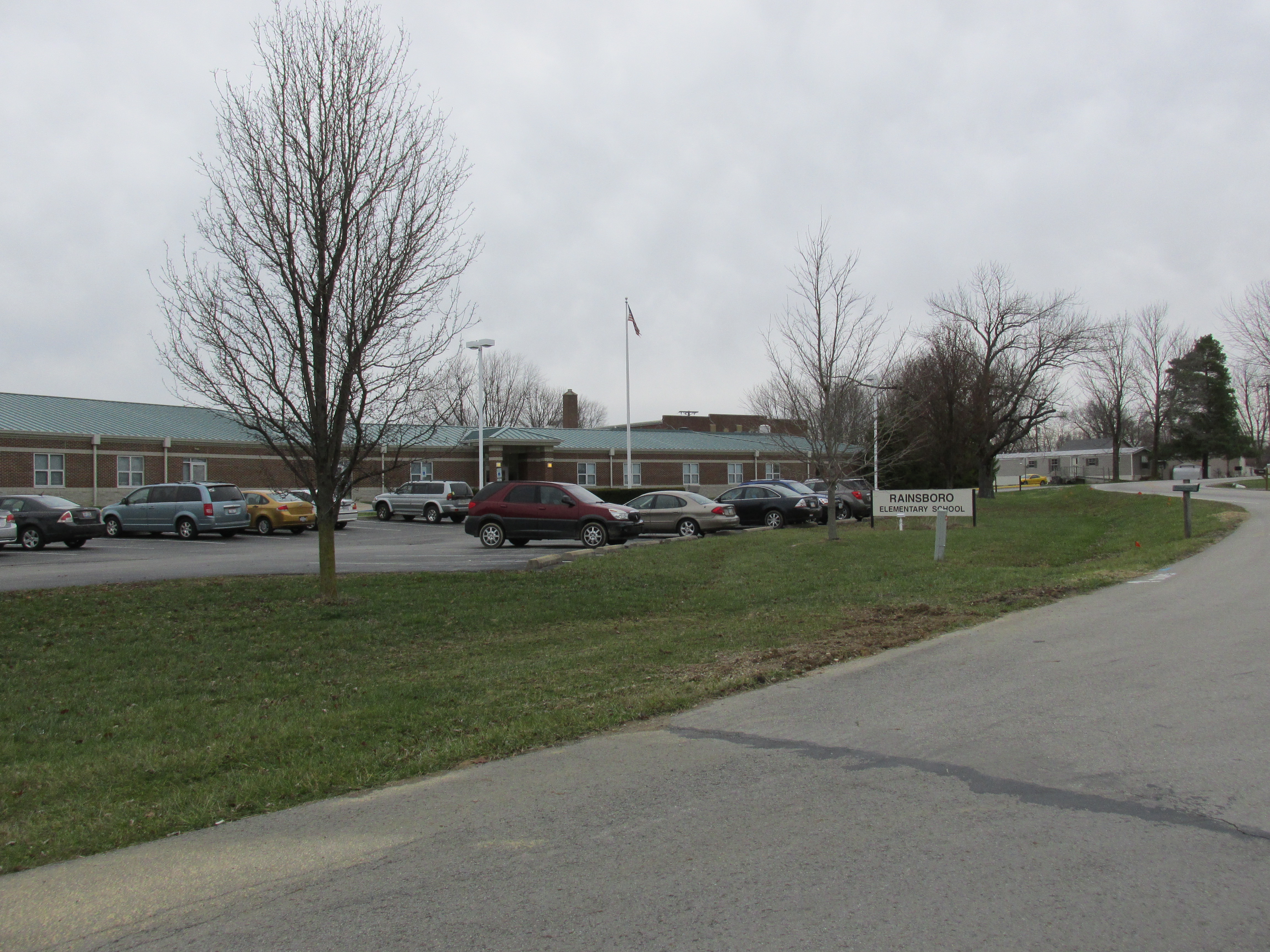
Rainsboro Elementary School

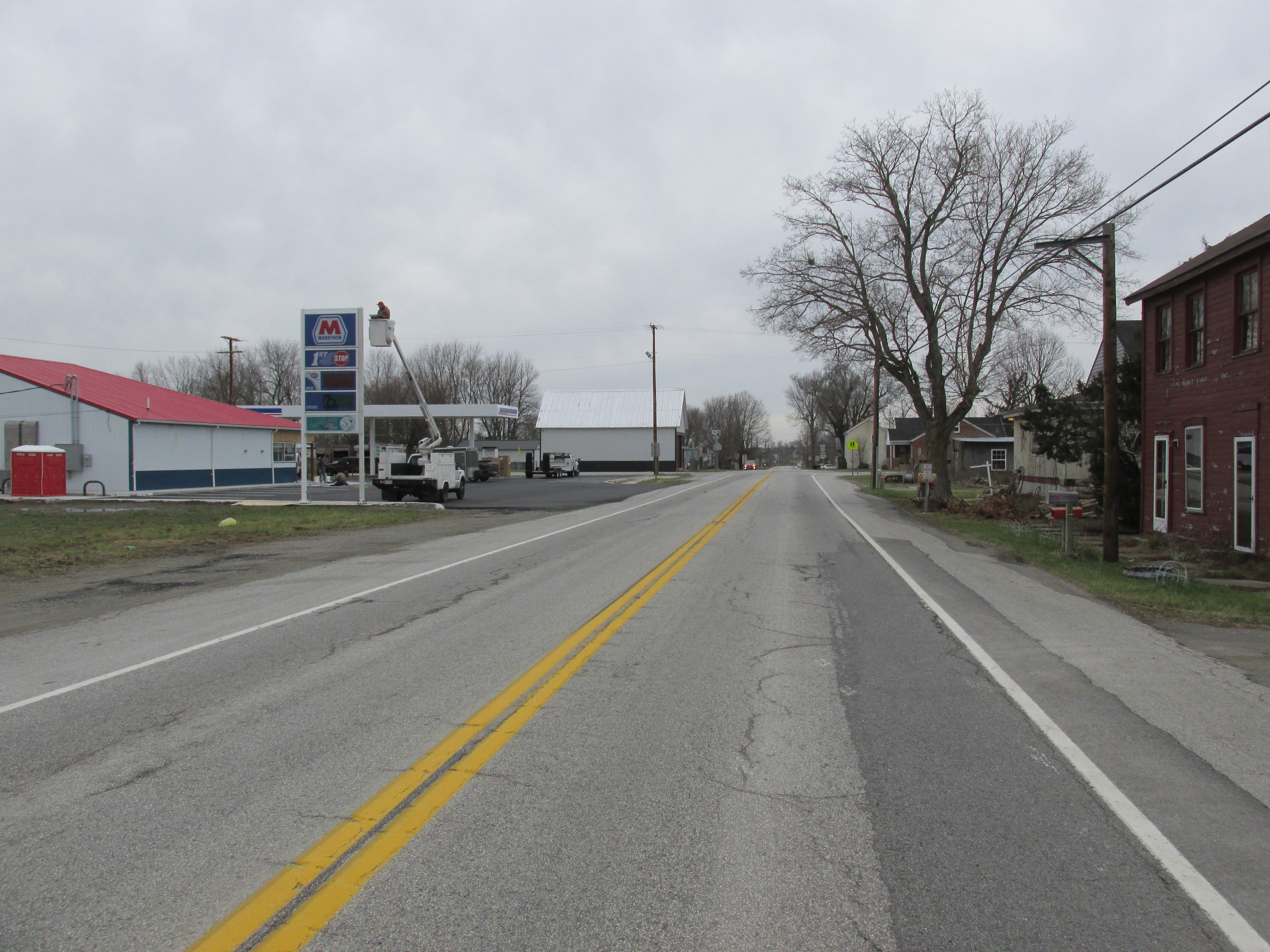
Looking west on U.S. Highway 50 in Rainsboro
