= Rocky Fork (Licking River tributary) =

Stream in Ohio, U.S.

Coordinates: 40°03′32″N 82°15′47″W

Rocky Fork is a stream in the U.S. state of Ohio. It is a tributary of the Licking River.

Rocky Fork was descriptively named for the boulders along its course.

== See also ==
- List of rivers of Ohio
