= Paint Creek State Park =

Park in Ohio, USA

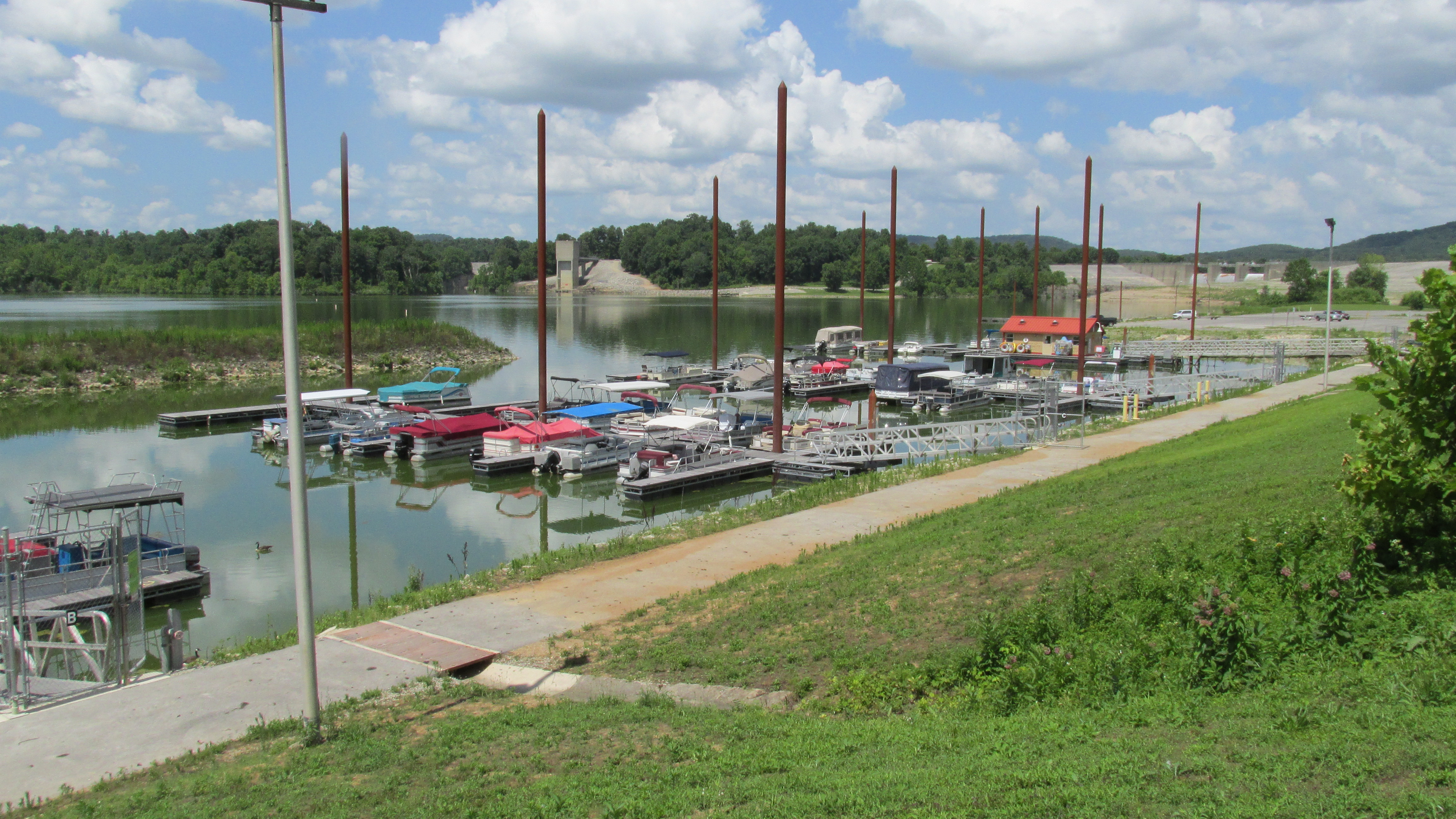
- Paint Creek Lake marina

- Location within Ohio Location within the United States
- Location: Highland and Ross counties, Ohio, United States
- Coordinates: 39°15′15″N 83°22′35″W
- Area: 5,652 acres (2,287 ha)
- Elevation: 850 ft (260 m)
- Established: 1972
- Administrator: Ohio Department of Natural Resources
- Designation: Ohio state park
- Website: Paint Creek State Park

Paint Creek State Park is a 5,652-acre (2,287 ha) public recreation area located in Highland and Ross counties in the U.S. state of Ohio. The state park's central feature is a reservoir, 1,148-acre (465 ha) Paint Creek Lake, which was created by the damming of Paint Creek. Construction on the dam started in 1967, and Paint Creek State Park was opened in 1972.

The underlying geology of the park is limestone, and significant limestone bluffs may be seen, and hiked to, just below the dam. The bluffs and gorges feature Coolwort (Sullivantia), an extremely rare wildflower in Ohio. as well as an outstanding colony of Smooth Cliffbrake (Pellaea glabella) ferns.

The Highlands Nature Sanctuary, a private, 2,068-acre (837 ha) nature reserve, is contiguous with the park.

== Gallery ==
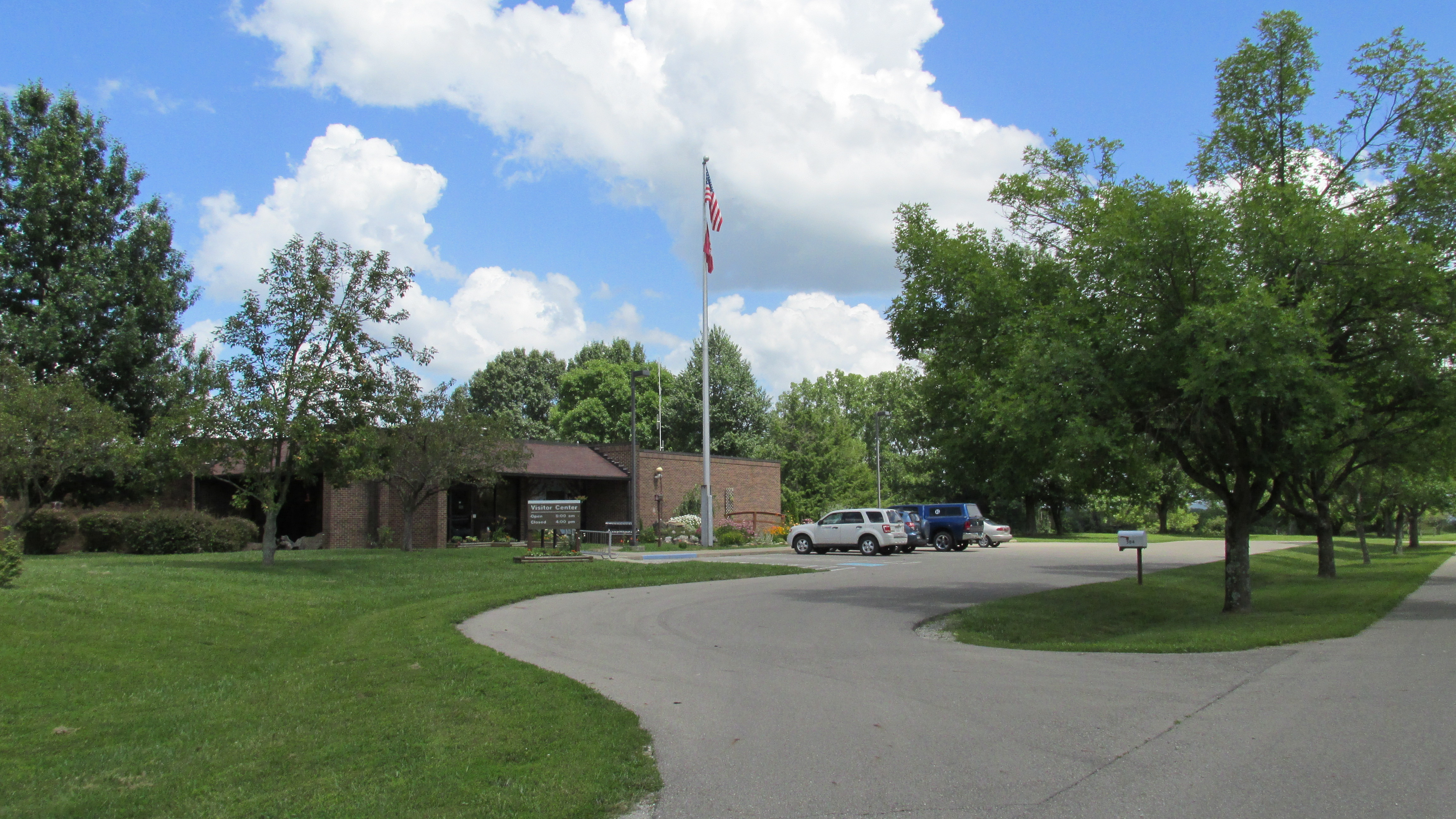
Park office

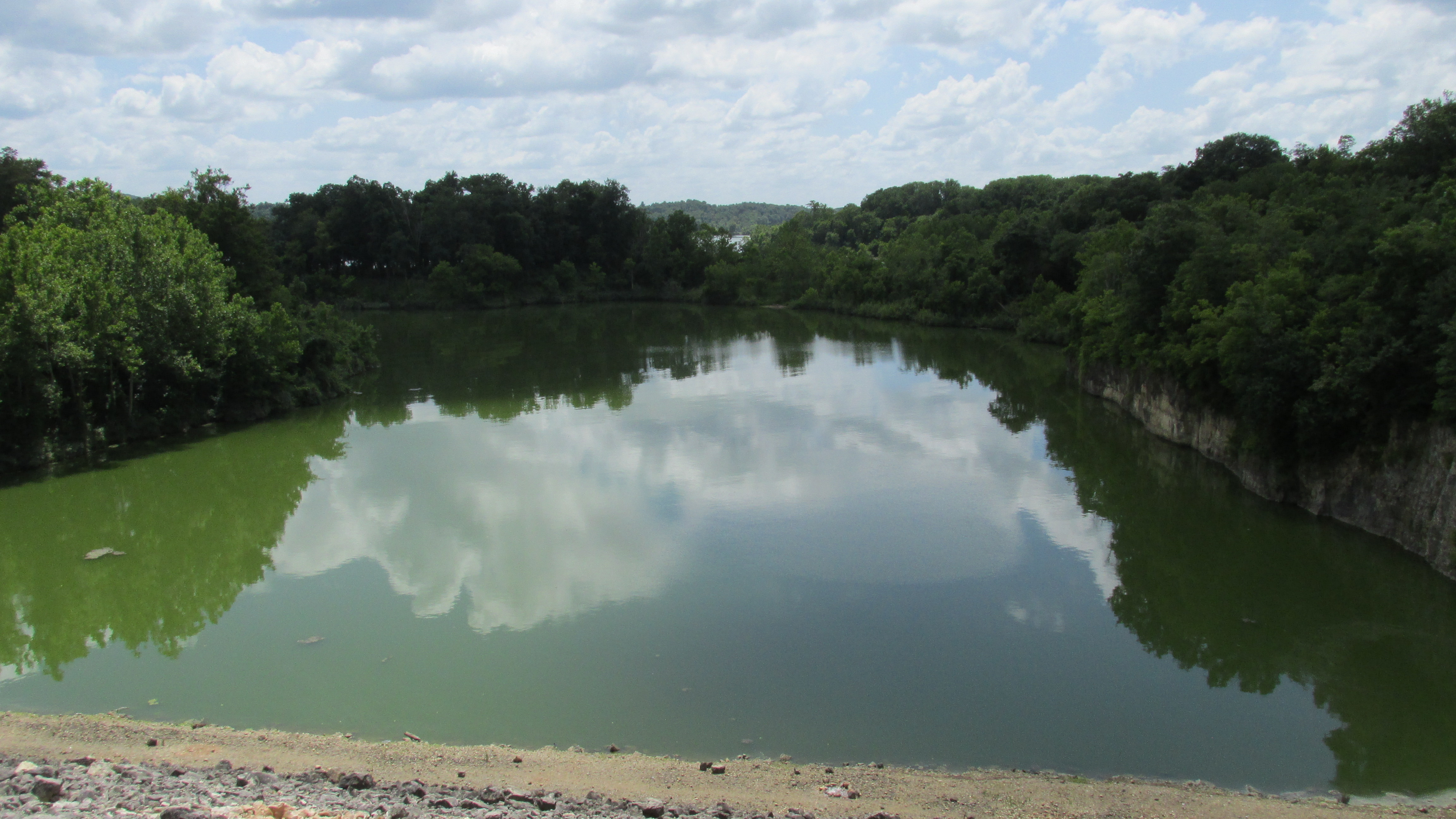
Body of water in front of dam

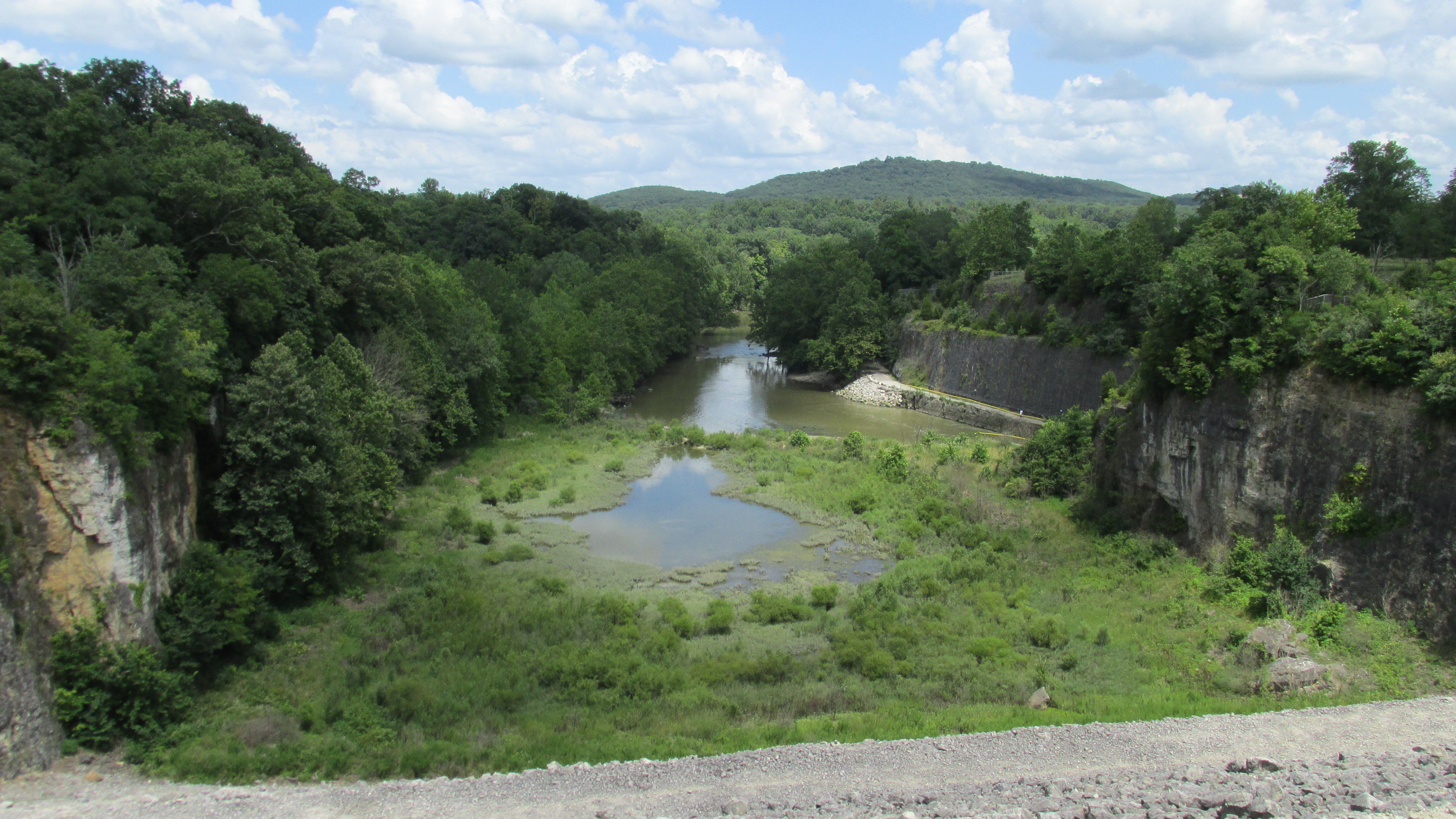
Creek bed below dam

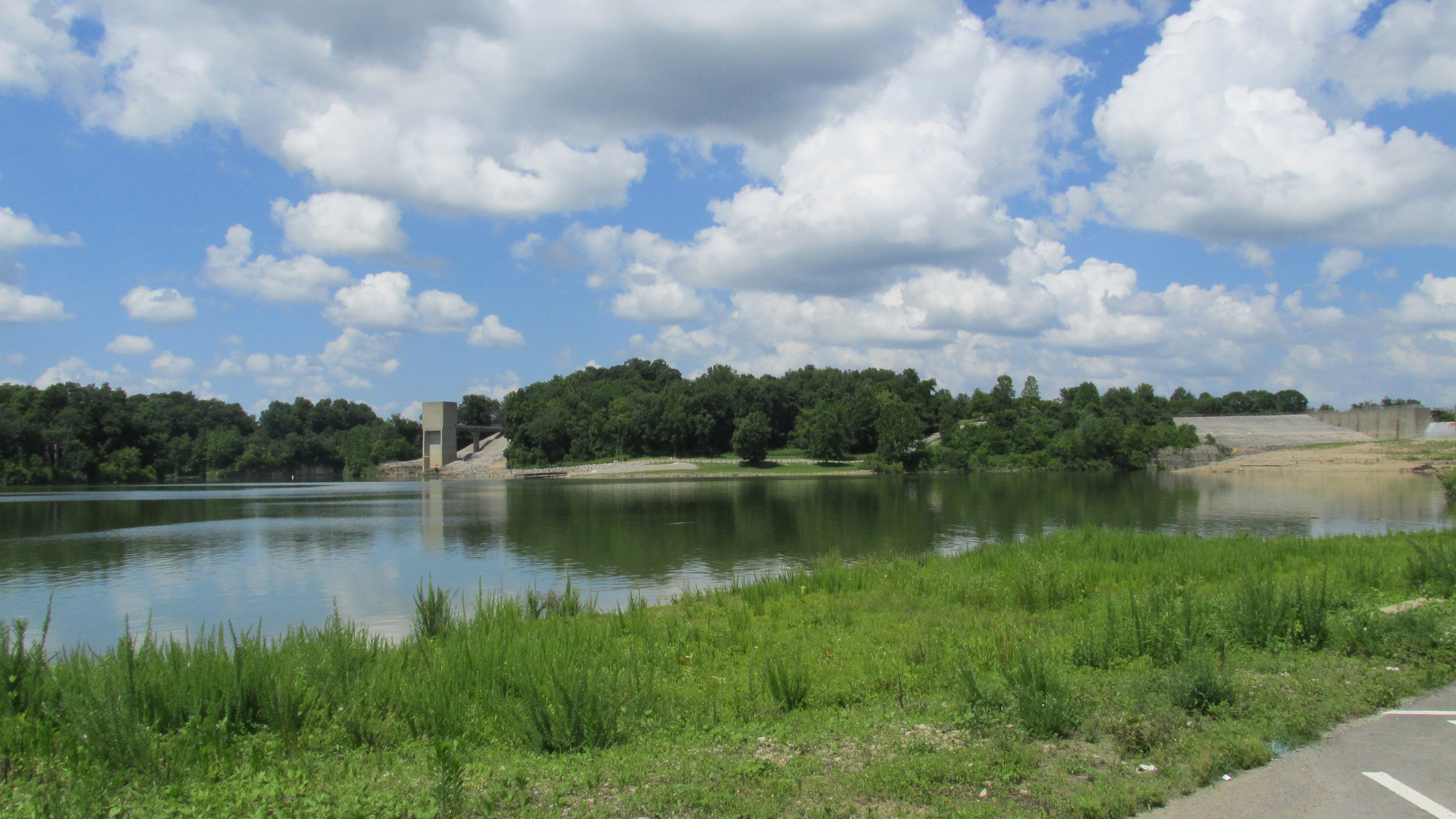
Boat launch area with intake in the background
