= Rocky Fork State Park (Ohio) =

Park in Ohio, United States

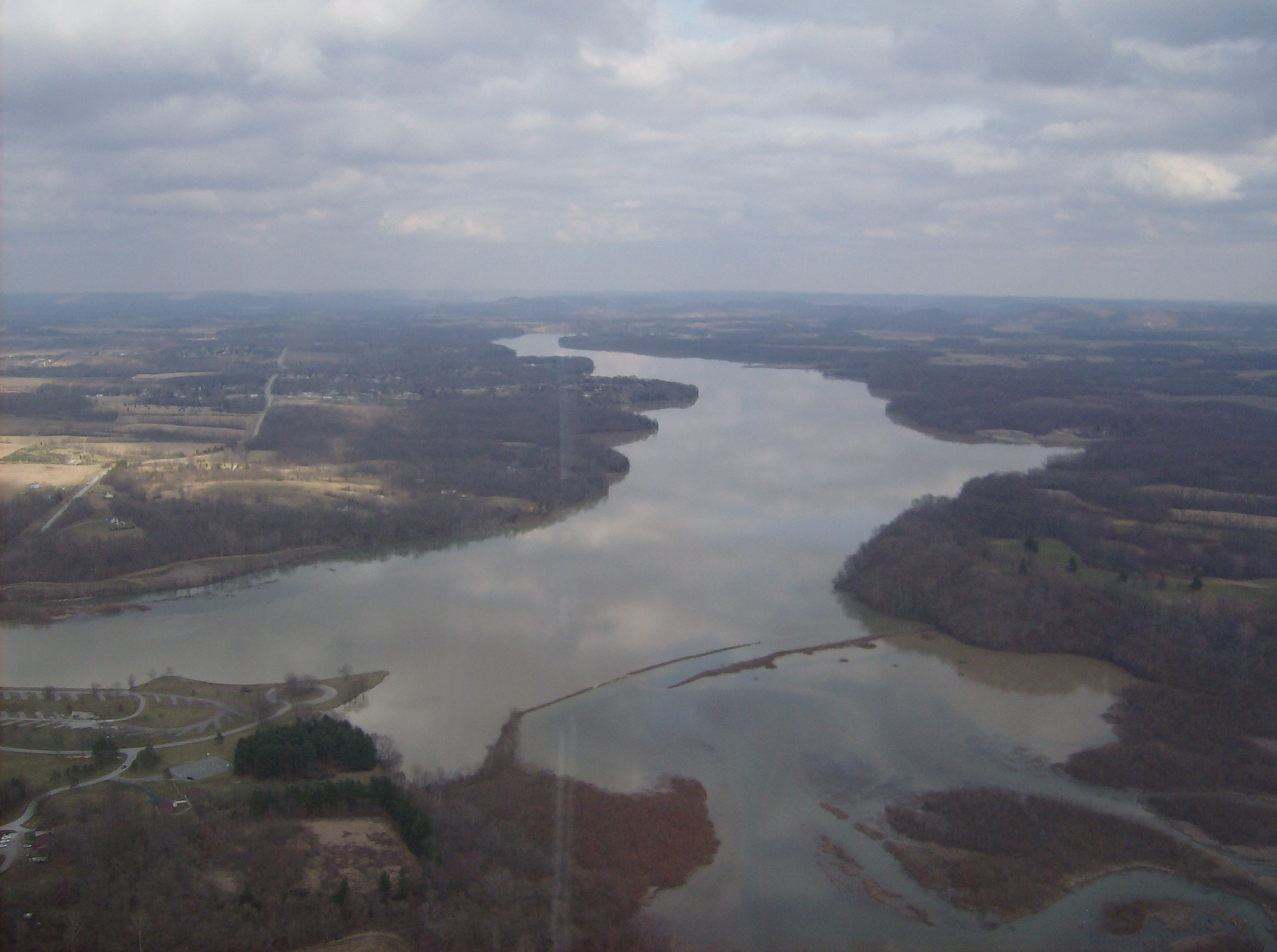
- Rocky Fork Lake

- Location within Ohio Location within the United States
- Location: Highland County, Ohio, United States
- Nearest city: Hillsboro, Ohio
- Coordinates: 39°11′10″N 83°28′19″W
- Area: Land: 1,384 acres (560 ha); Water: 2,080 acres (840 ha)
- Elevation: 879 ft (268 m)
- Established: 1950
- Administrator: Ohio Department of Natural Resources
- Visitors: 792,973 (in 2009)
- Designation: Ohio state park
- Website: Rocky Fork State Park

Rocky Fork State Park is a public recreation area located in Highland County, Ohio, United States. The state park's central feature is 2,080-acre (840 ha) Rocky Fork Lake and its 31 miles (50 km) of shoreline. The lake was added to the state park system in 1950. The park offers marinas, boat ramps, swimming beaches, picnic areas, hiking trails, and a nature center. Two significant archaeological sites dating from the Hopewellian period are located in the park, the Rocky Fork Park Group and the Rocky Fork Park Site.
