= Ohio State Route 771 =

State highway in Highland County, Ohio, US

State Route 771

Route information
- Maintained by ODOT
- Length: 7.11 mi (11.44 km)
- Existed: 1937–present

Major junctions
- South end: SR 138 in Paint Township
- North end: SR 28 in Leesburg

Location
- Country: United States
- State: Ohio
- Counties: Highland

Highway system
- Ohio State Highway System; Interstate; US; State; Scenic
← SR 770	→ SR 772

State Route 771 (SR 771) is a 7.11-mile-long (11.44 km) state highway located entirely in Highland County, Ohio. The north–south route connects SR 138 in Paint Township and SR 28 in Leesburg.

== Route description ==
The route begins at an unsignalized T-intersection with SR 138 in northern Paint Township. SR 771 heads north-northwest through first lightly wooded areas transitioning to farmland as it enters Fairfield Township. The elevation of the route remains relatively flat except when it dips slightly to cross the Hardin Creek in Fairfield Township. North of the creek, SR 771 enters the village limits of Leesburg and passes the Fairfield High School. While in Leesburg, the road name is South Fairfield Street. As the route enters downtown Leesburg, it passes through residential neighborhoods and light industrial facilities. After crossing the Indiana and Ohio railroad at-grade, SR 771 enters the central business district of the town and ends at a signalized intersection with SR 28.

== History ==
SR 771 was designated on a SR 138–Leesburg route around 1937 on a gravel road. However, it did not end in downtown Leesburg as it does today; US 62 was routed through the town therefore SR 771 ended at US 62 where County Route 60 intersects the route today. By 1941, the entire route was paved. Between 1969 and 1971, US 62 was rerouted on a bypass around the village which lead to the extension of SR 771 into downtown Leesburg. Since then, no major changes have affected the highway.

== Major intersections ==
The entire route is in Highland County.

Location	mi	km	Destinations	Notes
Paint Township	0.00	0.00	SR 138	
Leesburg	7.11	11.44	SR 28 (Main Street) / North Fairfield Street	
1.000 mi = 1.609 km; 1.000 km = 0.621 mi
