= Roxabell, Ohio =

Unincorporated community in Ohio, U.S.

Coordinates: 39°23′05″N 83°11′16″W

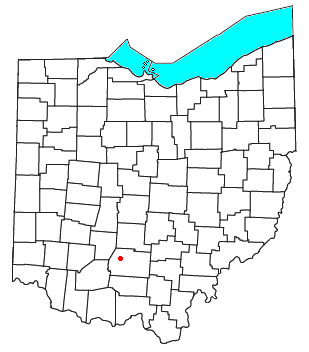
Location of Roxabell, Ohio

Roxabell is an unincorporated community in central Concord Township, Ross County, Ohio, United States. It lies at the intersection of Davis Hill and Jamison Roads, little more than 1 mile (about 2 km) south of the village of Frankfort. Two parts of the North Fork of Paint Creek, a subsidiary of the Ohio River through the Scioto River, pass near Roxabel. It is located slightly more than 3 miles (about 5 km) north of State Route 28, midway between the cities of Chillicothe—the county seat of Ross County—and Greenfield.

A post office called Roxabell was established in 1856, and remained in operation until 1933. The railroad was extended to Roxabell in the 1870s.

== Gallery ==
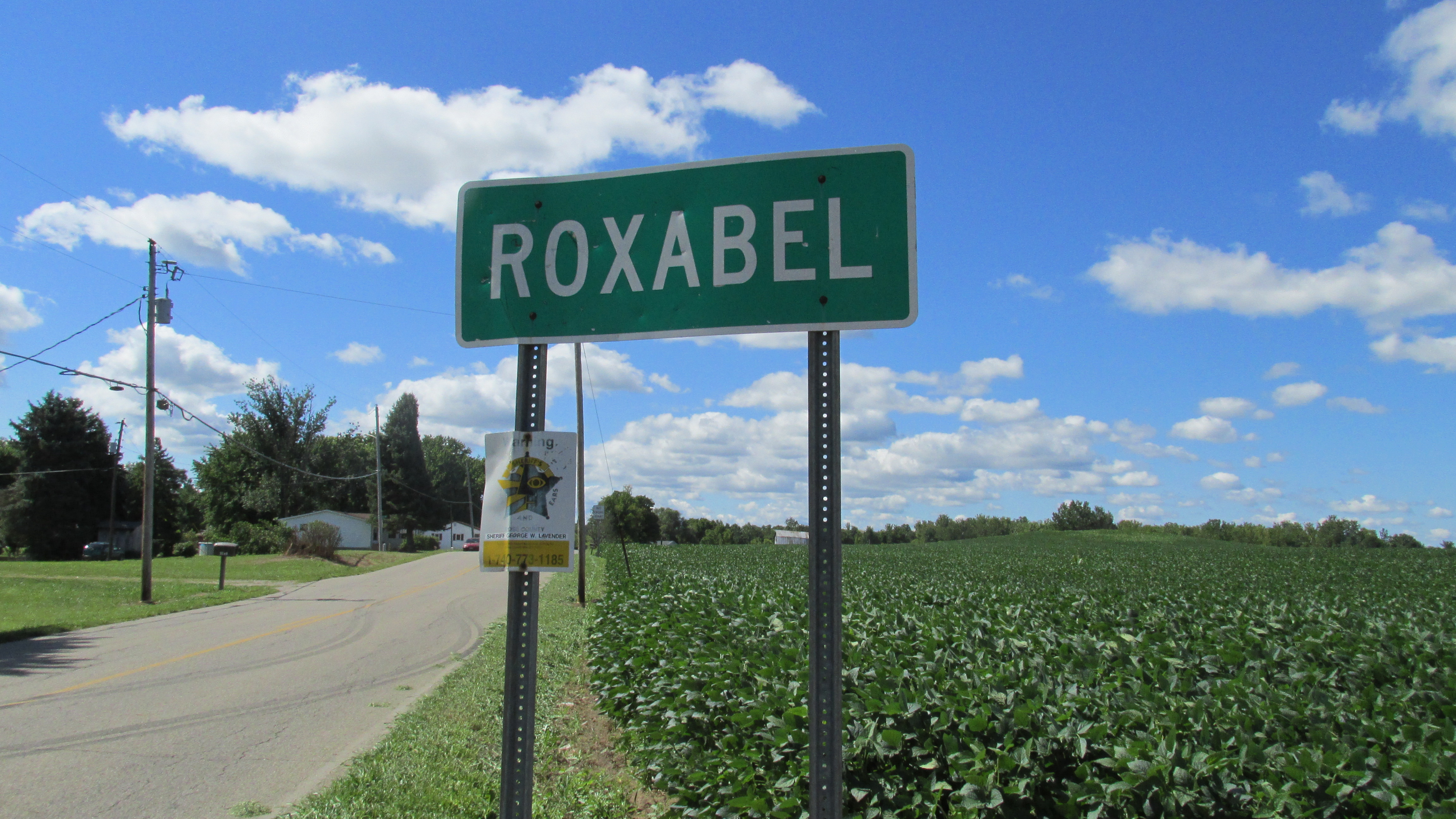
Roxabel community sign

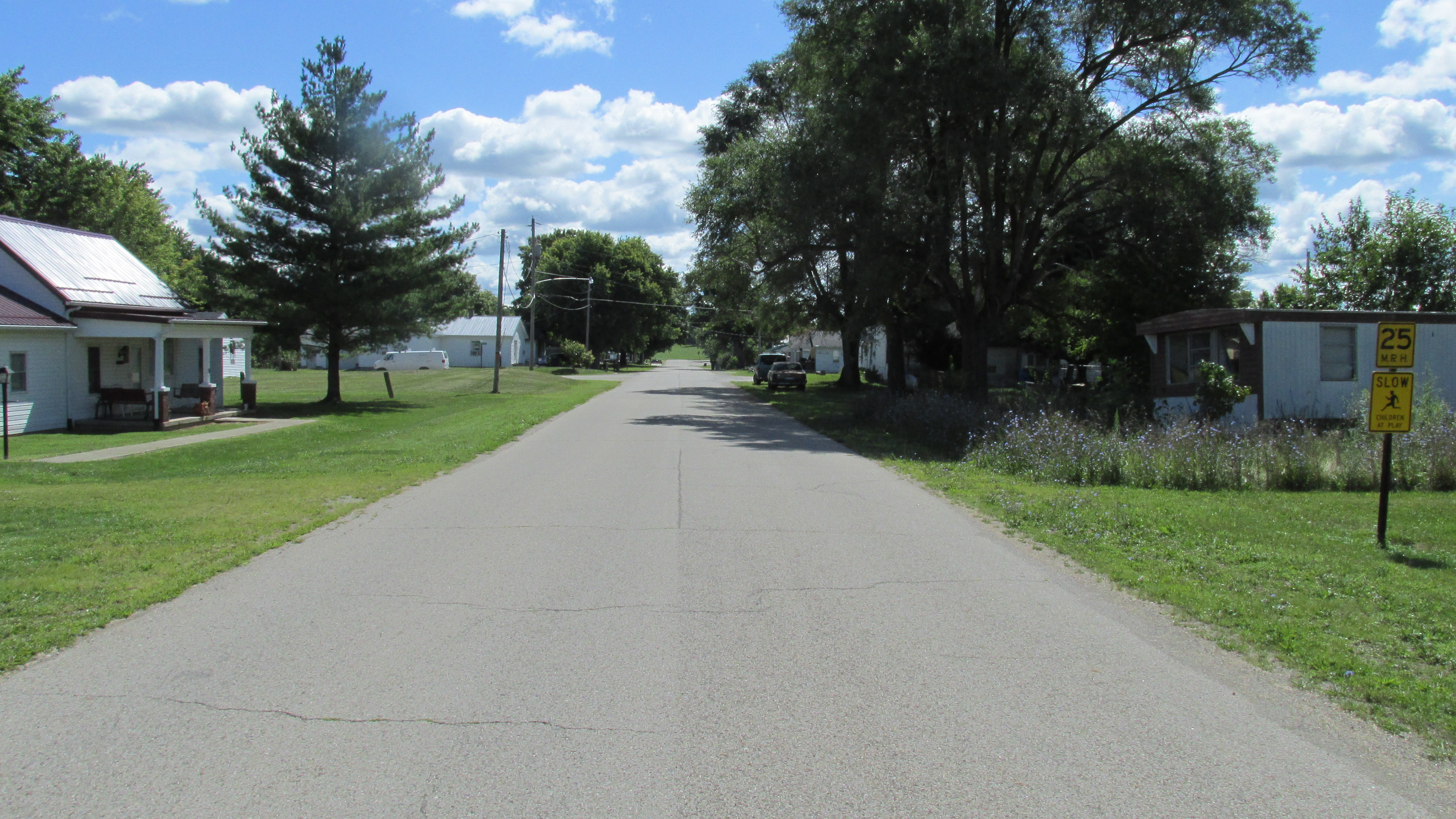
Looking east on Main Street in Roxabel

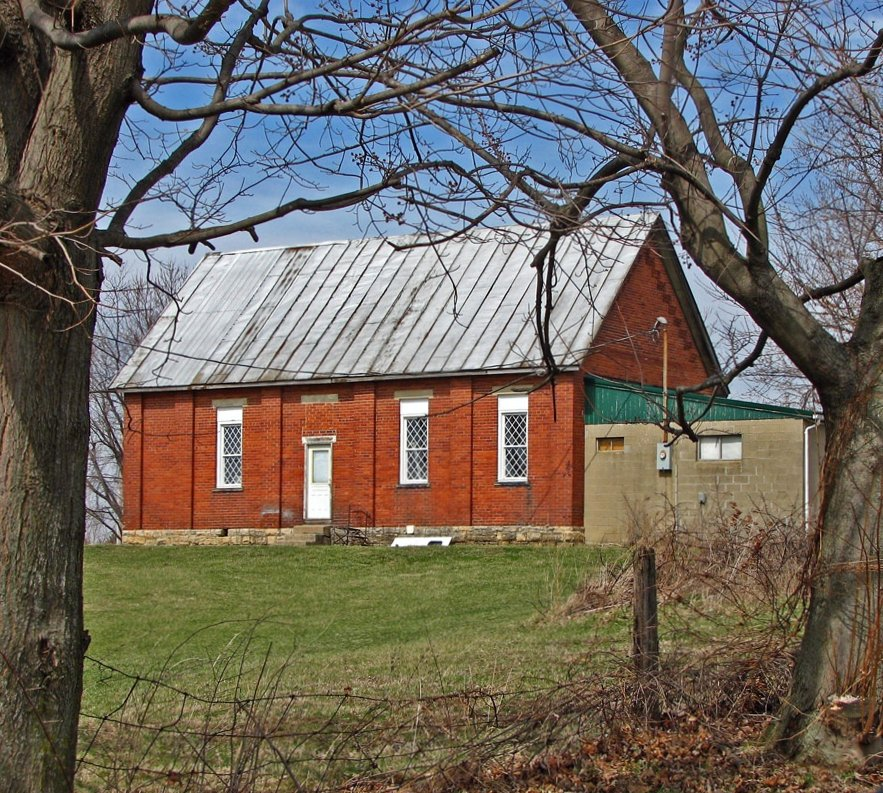
Former school, now a house, in Roxabel
