= Good Hope, Ohio =

- Census-designated place
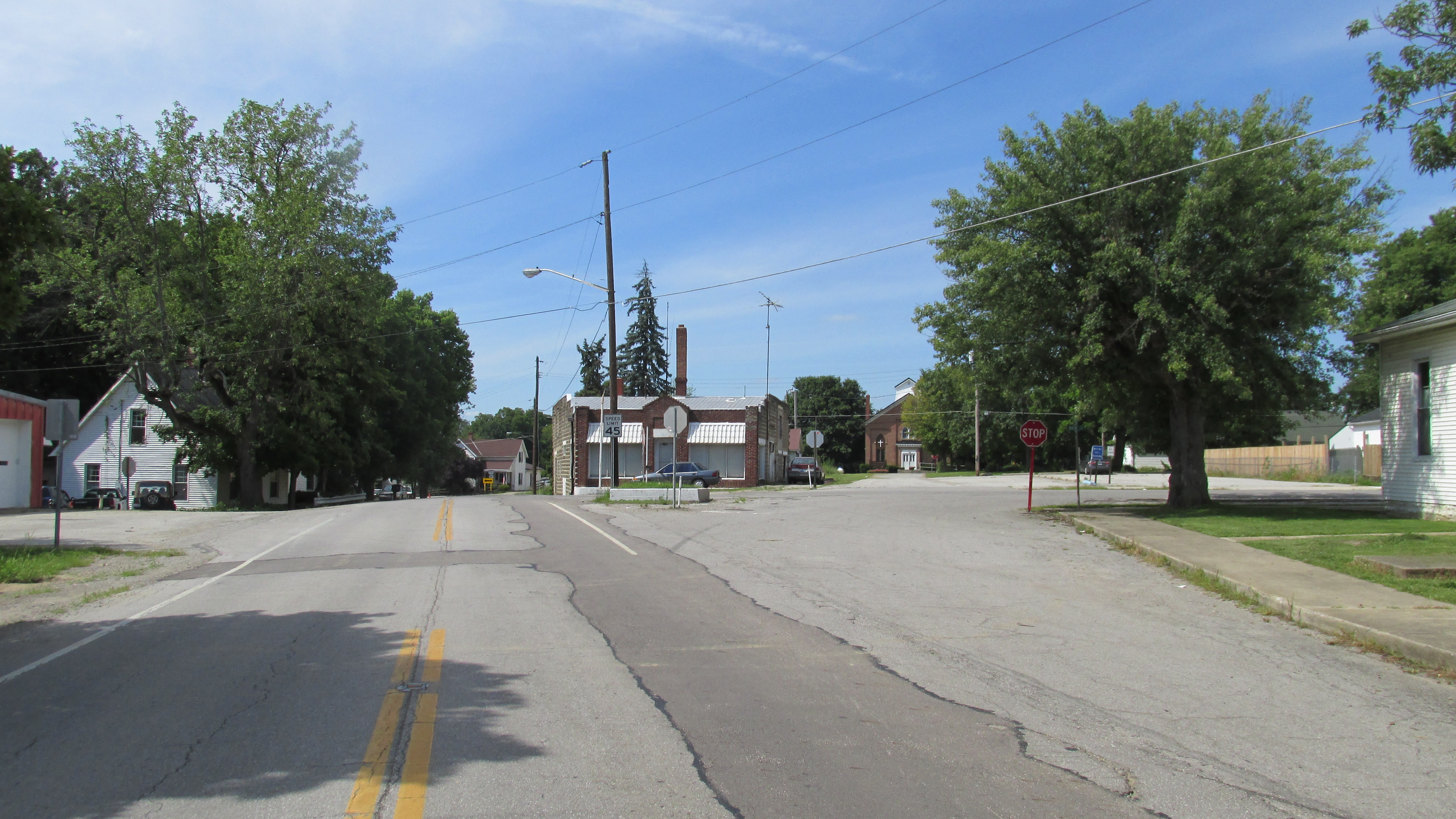
- Looking north on Ohio State Route 753 in Good Hope

- Location within Ohio Location within the United States
- Coordinates: 39°26′48″N 83°21′34″W
- Country: United States
- State: Ohio
- County: Fayette
- Township: Wayne

Area
  - Total: 0.75 sq mi (1.95 km^{2})
  - Land: 0.75 sq mi (1.95 km^{2})
  - Water: 0 sq mi (0.00 km^{2})
- Elevation: 935 ft (285 m)

Population (2020)
  - Total: 202
  - Density: 268.3/sq mi (103.61/km^{2})
- Time zone: UTC-5 (Eastern (EST))
  - Summer (DST): UTC-4 (EDT)
- FIPS code: 39-30828
- GNIS feature ID: 2628896

Good Hope is an unincorporated community and census-designated place (CDP) in central Wayne Township, Fayette County, Ohio, United States. The population was 202 at the 2020 census.

== History ==
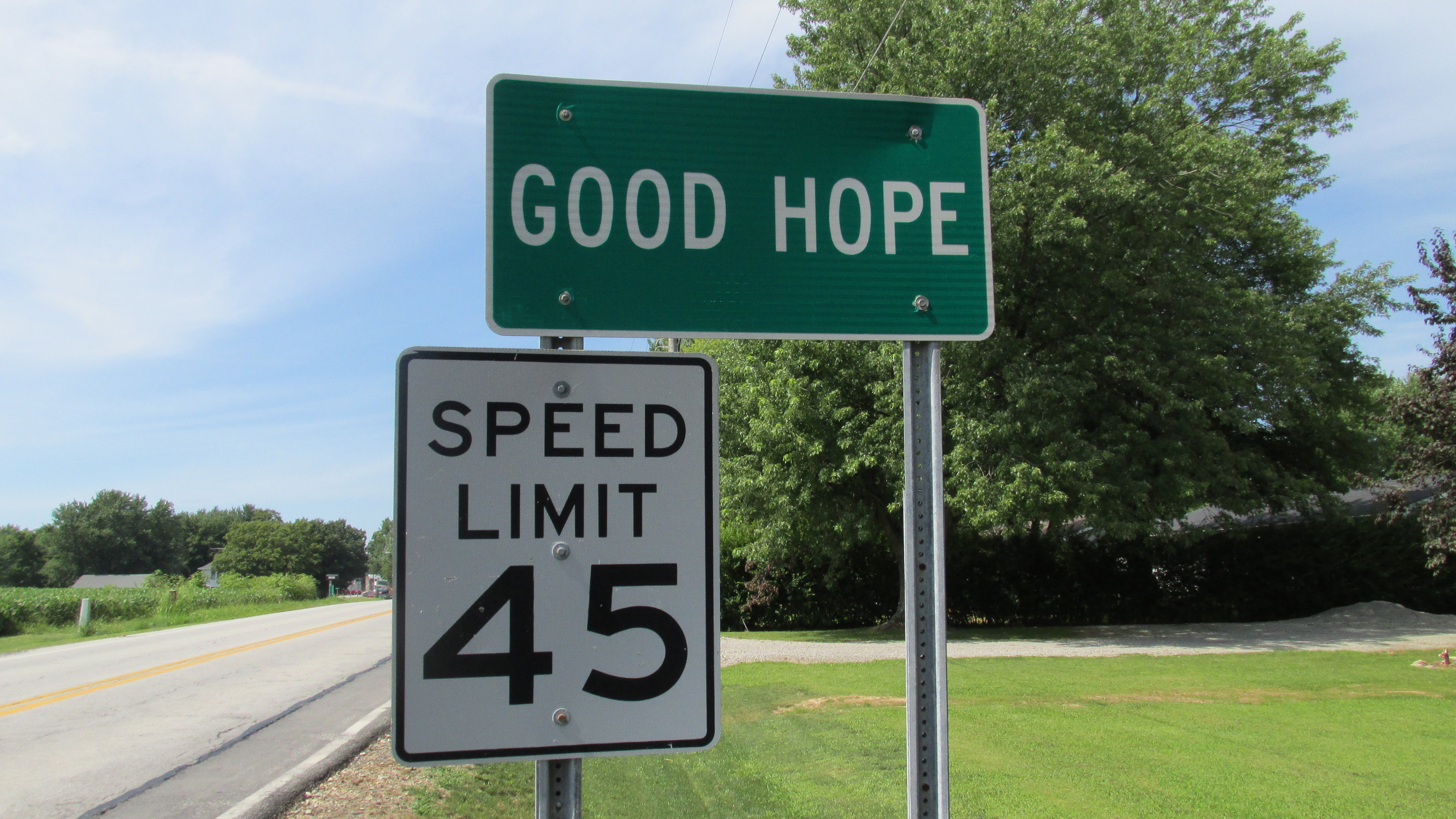
Good Hope community sign

Good Hope was platted in 1849, although a small village had already existed there for some time. The community is said to have derived its name from Good Hope, Pennsylvania, the native home of a share of the early settlers. A post office was established at Good Hope in 1851, and remained in operation until 1965.

It was only in 2012 that Good Hope had a waste treatment plant.

== Geography ==
Good Hope lies at the intersection of State Route 753 with Washington-Good Hope and Camp Grove Roads. Indian Creek, which meets Paint Creek slightly more than 2 miles (3 km) to the south, runs on the western edge of Good Hope. It is located midway between Greenfield and Washington Court House, the county seat of Fayette County.

== Demographics ==
Historical population
Census	Pop.	Note	%±
2020	202		—
U.S. Decennial Census
