= Rocky Fork Point, Ohio =

- Census-designated place
- Location within Ohio Location within the United States
- Coordinates: 39°11′18″N 83°29′29″W
- Country: United States
- State: Ohio
- County: Highland
- Township: Paint

Area
  - Total: 1.22 sq mi (3.17 km^{2})
  - Land: 0.71 sq mi (1.84 km^{2})
  - Water: 0.51 sq mi (1.33 km^{2})
- Elevation: 974 ft (297 m)

Population (2020)
  - Total: 742
  - Density: 1,041.7/sq mi (402.19/km^{2})
- Time zone: UTC-5 (Eastern (EST))
  - Summer (DST): UTC-4 (EDT)
- Area codes: 937, 326
- GNIS feature ID: 2633223
- FIPS code: 39-68004

Rocky Fork Point is an unincorporated community and census-designated place in Highland County, Ohio, United States. Its population was 742 as of the 2020 census.

== Geography ==
The community is in eastern Highland County, along the southern edge of Paint Township. It is bordered to the east by the Highland Holiday CDP. Both communities sit on the north shore of Rocky Fork Lake, a reservoir built on the Rocky Fork, an east-flowing tributary of Paint Creek, which in turn flows east to the Scioto River and is part of the Ohio River watershed. According to the U.S. Census Bureau, the Rocky Fork Point CDP has an area of 1.224 square miles (3.17 km^{2}); 0.712 square miles (1.84 km^{2}) of its area is land, and 0.512 square miles (1.33 km^{2}) is water. The community is 7 miles (11 km) east of Hillsboro, the Highland county seat.

== Demographics ==
Historical population
Census	Pop.	Note	%±
2020	742		—
U.S. Decennial Census
