= Highland Holiday, Ohio =

- Census-designated place
- Location within Ohio Location within the United States
- Coordinates: 39°11′51″N 83°28′10″W
- Country: United States
- State: Ohio
- County: Highland
- Township: Paint

Area
  - Total: 1.10 sq mi (2.84 km^{2})
  - Land: 0.60 sq mi (1.56 km^{2})
  - Water: 0.49 sq mi (1.28 km^{2})
- Elevation: 938 ft (286 m)

Population (2020)
  - Total: 571
  - Density: 945.0/sq mi (364.87/km^{2})
- Time zone: UTC-5 (Eastern (EST))
  - Summer (DST): UTC-4 (EDT)
- Area codes: 937, 326
- GNIS feature ID: 2633225
- FIPS code: 39-35256

Highland Holiday is an unincorporated community and census-designated place in Highland County, Ohio, United States. Its population was 571 as of the 2020 census.

== Geography ==
Highland Holiday is in eastern Highland County, along the southern edge of Paint Township. It is bordered to the west by the Rocky Fork Point CDP. Both communities sit on the north side of Rocky Fork Lake, a reservoir built on the Rocky Fork, an east-flowing tributary of Paint Creek, which in turn flows east to the Scioto River and is part of the Ohio River watershed. According to the U.S. Census Bureau, the community has an area of 1.097 square miles (2.84 km^{2}); 0.604 square miles (1.56 km^{2}) of its area is land, and 0.493 square miles (1.28 km^{2}) is water. Highland Holiday is 9 miles (14 km) east of Hillsboro, the Highland county seat.

== Demographics ==
Historical population
Census	Pop.	Note	%±
2020	571		—
U.S. Decennial Census
