= Madison Township, Highland County, Ohio =

Township in Ohio, US

- Township
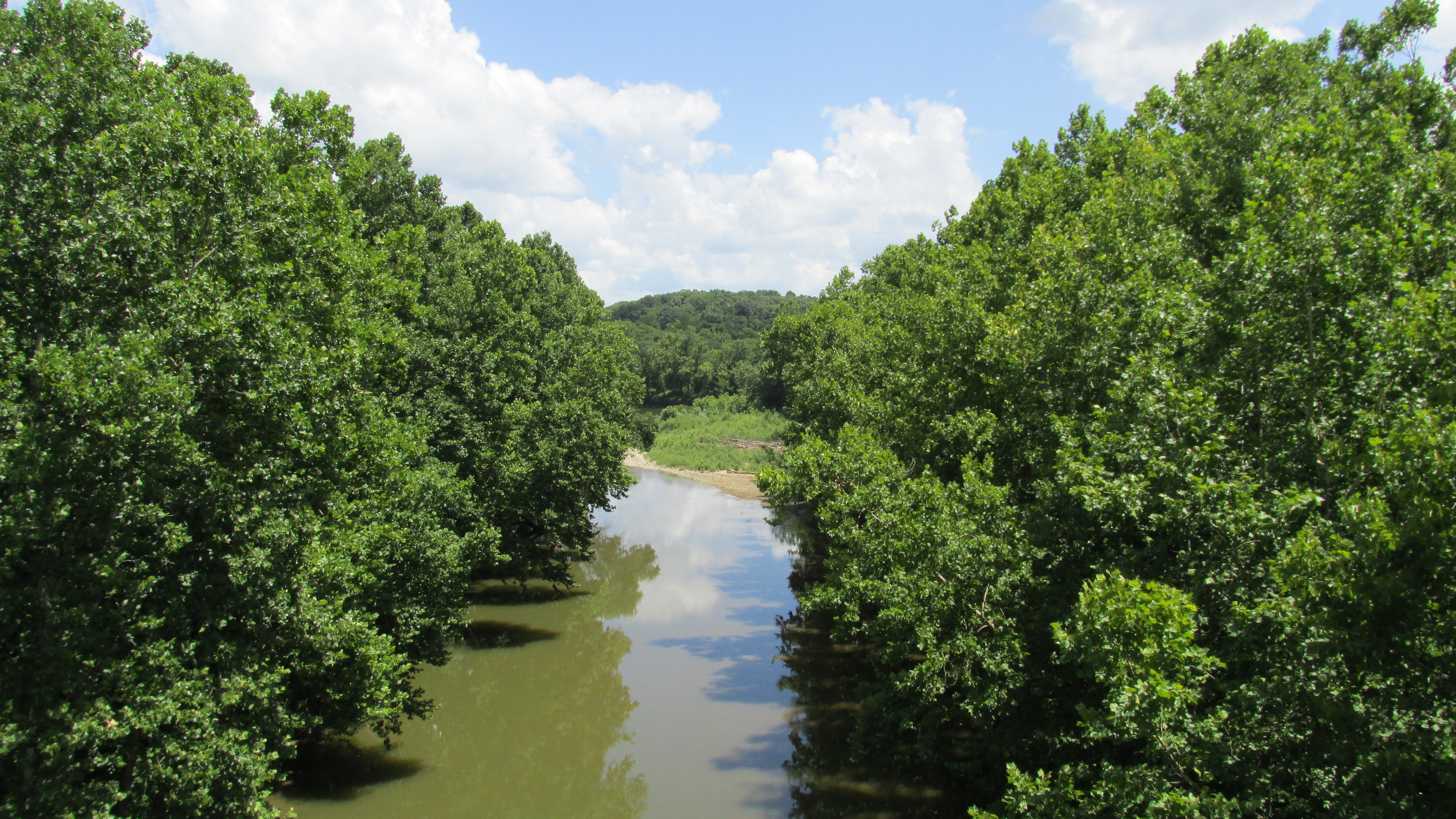
- Rattlesnake Creek on the township's southwestern border

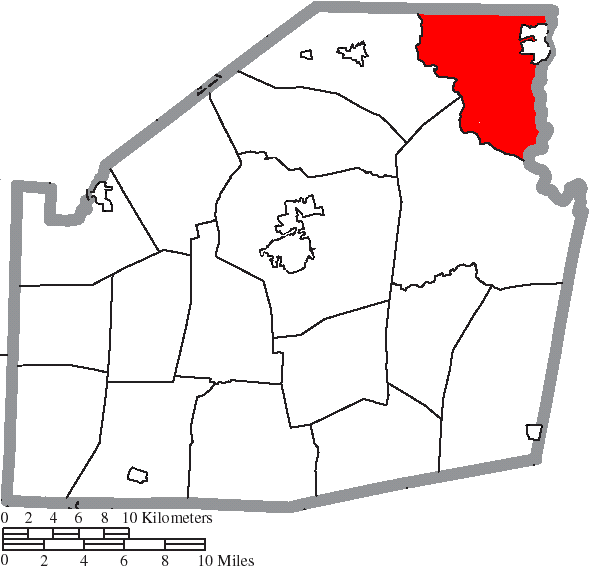
- Location of Madison Township in Highland County
- Coordinates: 39°20′56″N 83°23′52″W
- Country: United States
- State: Ohio
- County: Highland

Area
  - Total: 34.7 sq mi (89.9 km^{2})
  - Land: 34.4 sq mi (89.0 km^{2})
  - Water: 0.35 sq mi (0.9 km^{2})
- Elevation: 920 ft (280 m)

Population (2020)
  - Total: 6,422
  - Density: 187/sq mi (72.2/km^{2})
- Time zone: UTC-5 (Eastern (EST))
  - Summer (DST): UTC-4 (EDT)
- FIPS code: 39-46452
- GNIS feature ID: 1086307

Madison Township is one of the seventeen townships of Highland County, Ohio, United States. As of the 2020 census the population was 6,422.

== Geography ==
Located in the northeastern corner of the county, it borders the following townships:

- Perry Township, Fayette County - north
- Wayne Township, Fayette County - northeast corner
- Buckskin Township, Ross County - east
- Paint Township, Ross County - southeast
- Paint Township - south
- Fairfield Township - west
- Green Township, Fayette County - northwest corner

Most of the village of Greenfield is located in northeastern Madison Township.

== Name and history ==
It is one of twenty Madison Townships statewide.

== Government ==
The township is governed by a three-member board of trustees, who are elected in November of odd-numbered years to a four-year term beginning on the following January 1. Two are elected in the year after the presidential election and one is elected in the year before it. There is also an elected township fiscal officer, who serves a four-year term beginning on April 1 of the year after the election, which is held in November of the year before the presidential election. Vacancies in the fiscal officership or on the board of trustees are filled by the remaining trustees.
