= Paint Township, Ohio =

Paint Township, Ohio may refer to:

- Paint Township, Fayette County, Ohio
- Paint Township, Highland County, Ohio
- Paint Township, Holmes County, Ohio
- Paint Township, Madison County, Ohio
- Paint Township, Ross County, Ohio
- Paint Township, Wayne County, Ohio

== See also ==
- Paint Township (disambiguation)
