= Fairfield Township, Highland County, Ohio =

Township in Ohio, US

- Township
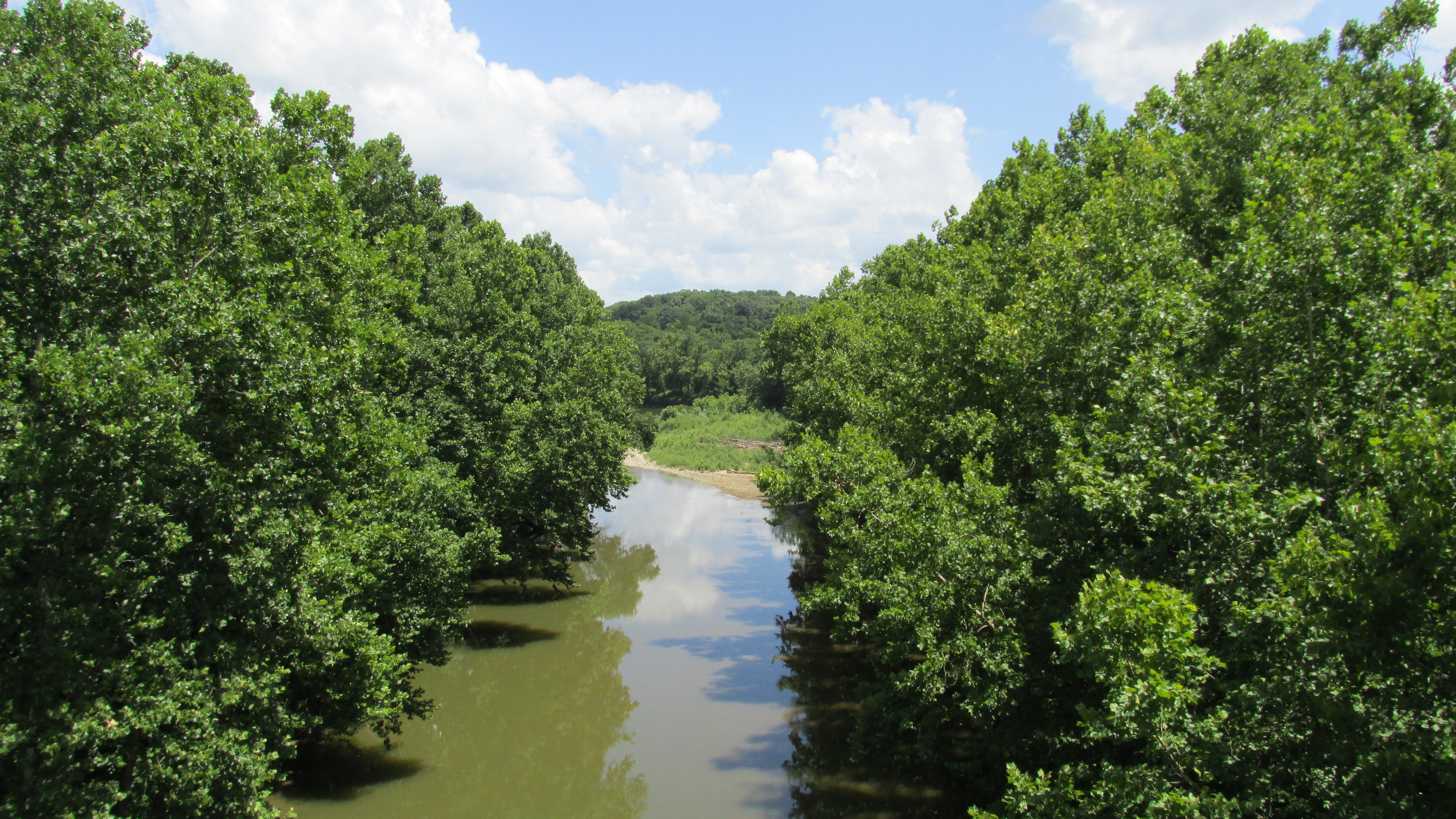
- Rattlesnake Creek on the township's northeastern border

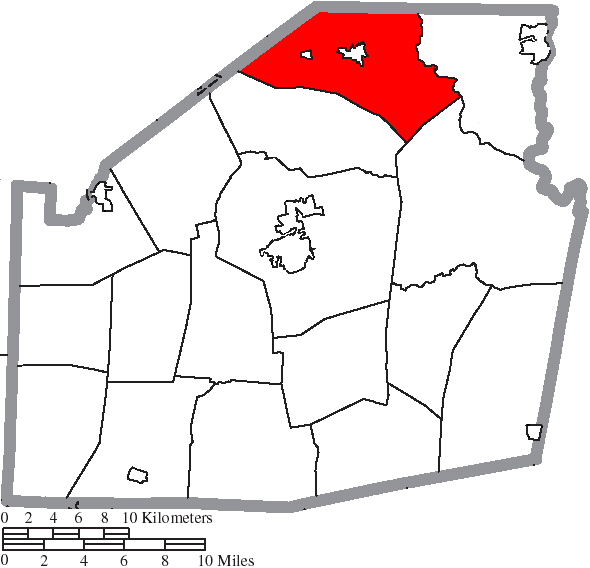
- Location of Fairfield Township in Highland County
- Coordinates: 39°20′23″N 83°33′27″W
- Country: United States
- State: Ohio
- County: Highland

Area
  - Total: 39.70 sq mi (102.83 km^{2})
  - Land: 39.69 sq mi (102.80 km^{2})
  - Water: 0.012 sq mi (0.03 km^{2})
- Elevation: 981 ft (299 m)

Population (2020)
  - Total: 3,661
  - Density: 92.24/sq mi (35.61/km^{2})
- Time zone: UTC-5 (Eastern (EST))
  - Summer (DST): UTC-4 (EDT)
- FIPS code: 39-26026
- GNIS feature ID: 1086303

Fairfield Township is one of the seventeen townships of Highland County, Ohio, United States. As of the 2020 census the population was 3,661.

== Geography ==
Located in the northern part of the county, it borders the following townships:

- Green Township, Fayette County - north
- Perry Township, Fayette County - northeast corner
- Madison Township - east
- Paint Township - southeast
- Penn Township - southwest
- Green Township, Clinton County - west
- Wayne Township, Clinton County - northwest

Two incorporated villages are located in Fairfield Township: Highland in the west, and Leesburg in the center.

== Name and history ==
It is one of seven Fairfield Townships statewide.

== Government ==
The township is governed by a three-member board of trustees, who are elected in November of odd-numbered years to a four-year term beginning on the following January 1. Two are elected in the year after the presidential election and one is elected in the year before it. There is also an elected township fiscal officer, who serves a four-year term beginning on April 1 of the year after the election, which is held in November of the year before the presidential election. Vacancies in the fiscal officership or on the board of trustees are filled by the remaining trustees.
