= Paint Township =

Paint Township may refer to the following places in the United States:

== Ohio ==
- Paint Township, Fayette County, Ohio
- Paint Township, Highland County, Ohio
- Paint Township, Holmes County, Ohio
- Paint Township, Madison County, Ohio
- Paint Township, Ross County, Ohio
- Paint Township, Wayne County, Ohio

== Pennsylvania ==
- Paint Township, Clarion County, Pennsylvania
- Paint Township, Somerset County, Pennsylvania
