= Buckskin Township, Ohio =

Township in Ohio, US

- Township
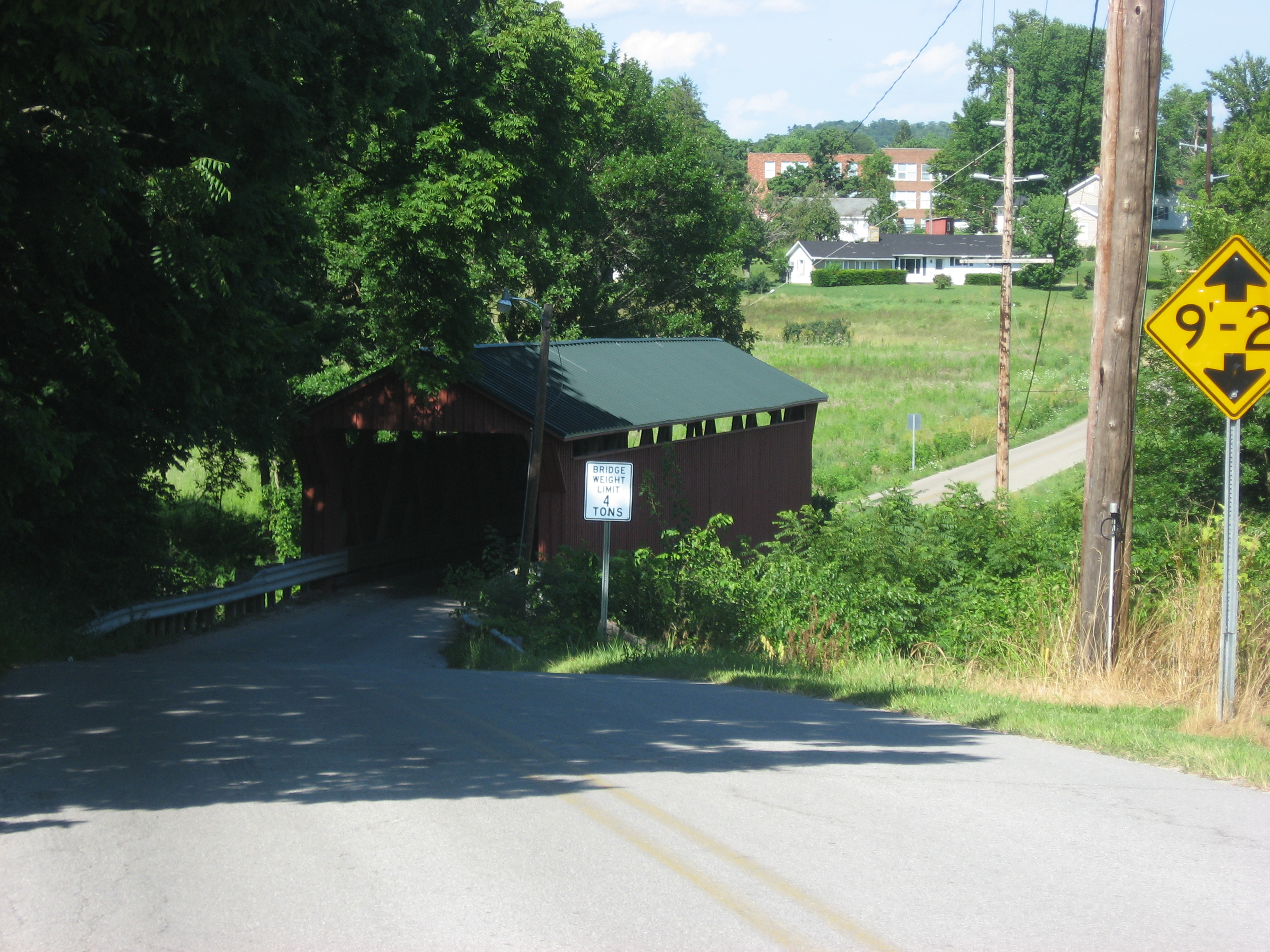
- The South Salem Covered Bridge, a historic site in the township

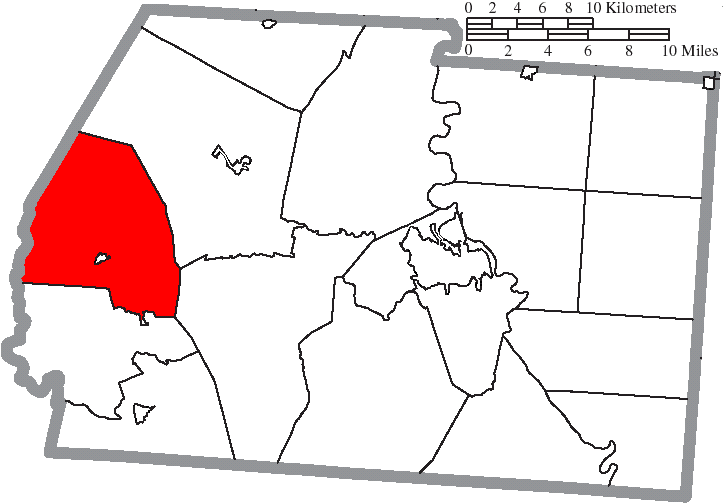
- Location of Buckskin Township in Ross County
- Coordinates: 39°21′6″N 83°18′16″W
- Country: United States
- State: Ohio
- County: Ross

Area
  - Total: 50.3 sq mi (130.2 km^{2})
  - Land: 50.3 sq mi (130.2 km^{2})
  - Water: 0 sq mi (0.0 km^{2})
- Elevation: 1,099 ft (335 m)

Population (2020)
  - Total: 2,047
  - Density: 40.72/sq mi (15.72/km^{2})
- Time zone: UTC-5 (Eastern (EST))
  - Summer (DST): UTC-4 (EDT)
- FIPS code: 39-10016
- GNIS feature ID: 1086891
- Website: https://buckskintwp.org/

Buckskin Township is one of the sixteen townships of Ross County, Ohio, United States. The 2020 census found 2,047 people in the township.

== Geography ==
Located in the western part of the county, it borders the following townships:

- Concord Township - northeast
- Twin Township - southeast
- Paint Township - south
- Paint Township, Highland County - southwest
- Perry Township, Fayette County - western corner
- Wayne Township, Fayette County - northwest

The village of South Salem is located in southern Buckskin Township.

== Name and history ==
It is the only Buckskin Township statewide.

== Government ==
The township is governed by a three-member board of trustees, who are elected in November of odd-numbered years to a four-year term beginning on the following January 1. Two are elected in the year after the presidential election and one is elected in the year before it. There is also an elected township fiscal officer, who serves a four-year term beginning on April 1 of the year after the election, which is held in November of the year before the presidential election. Vacancies in the fiscal officership or on the board of trustees are filled by the remaining trustees.
