= Wayne Township, Fayette County, Ohio =

Township in Ohio, US

- Township
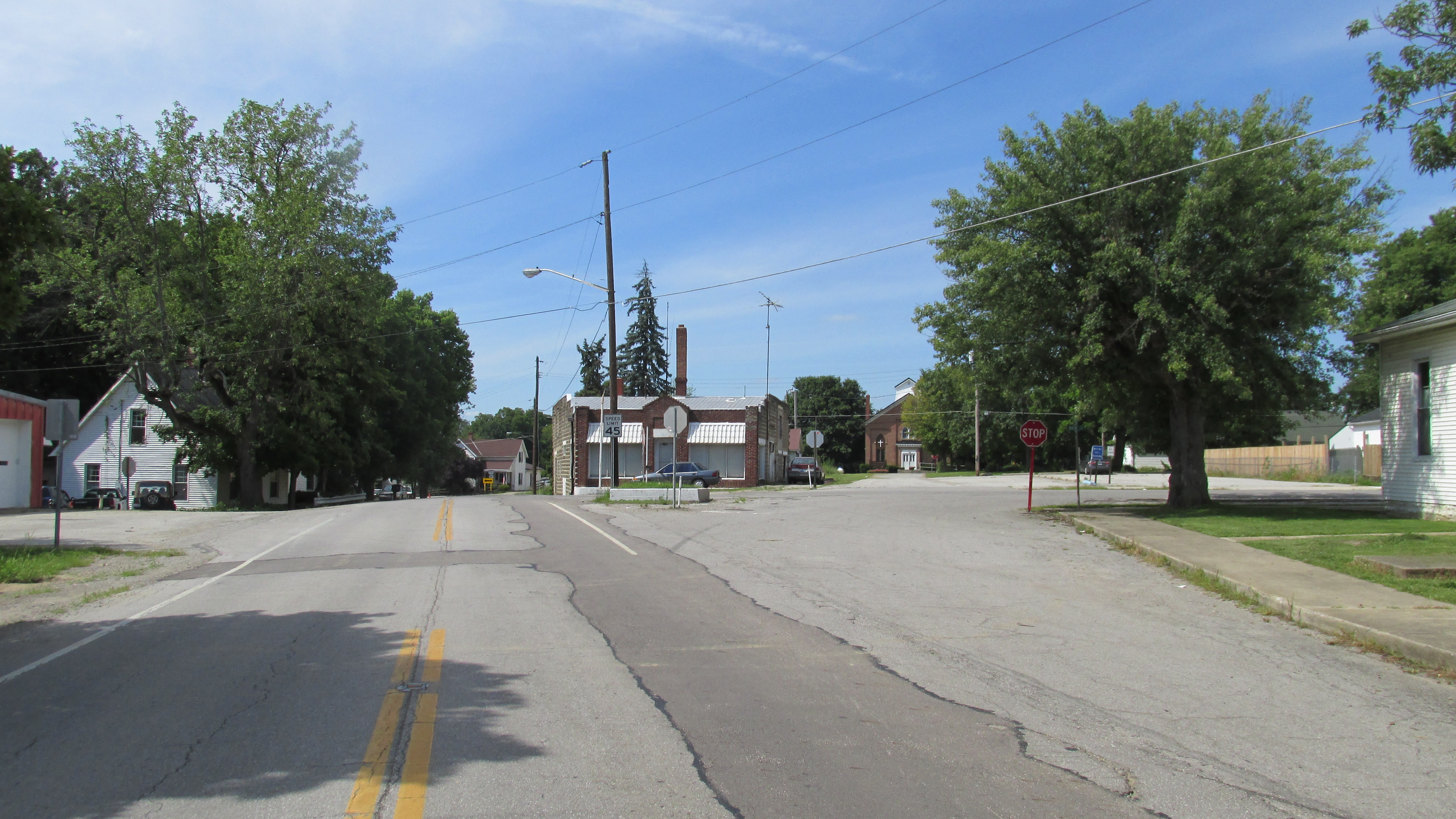
- State Route 753 in Good Hope

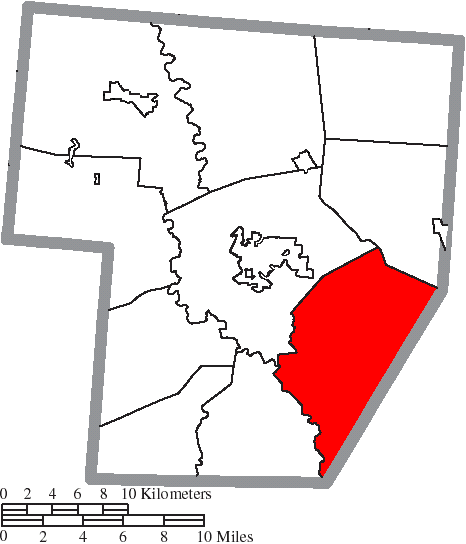
- Location of Wayne Township in Fayette County
- Coordinates: 39°28′21″N 83°21′0″W
- Country: United States
- State: Ohio
- County: Fayette

Area
  - Total: 46.1 sq mi (119.5 km^{2})
  - Land: 46.1 sq mi (119.5 km^{2})
  - Water: 0 sq mi (0.0 km^{2})
- Elevation: 922 ft (281 m)

Population (2020)
  - Total: 1,341
  - Density: 29.06/sq mi (11.22/km^{2})
- Time zone: UTC-5 (Eastern (EST))
  - Summer (DST): UTC-4 (EDT)
- FIPS code: 39-82166
- GNIS feature ID: 1086096

Wayne Township is one of the ten townships of Fayette County, Ohio, United States. As of the 2020 census the population was 1,341.

== Geography ==
Located in the southeastern part of the county, it borders the following townships:

- Marion Township - north
- Perry Township, Pickaway County - northwest corner
- Deerfield Township, Ross County - far east
- Concord Township, Ross County - southeast
- Buckskin Township, Ross County - far south
- Madison Township, Highland County - south corner
- Perry Township - west
- Union Township - northwest

Wayne Township is the only township in Fayette County to border Ross County, other than at a corner point.

No municipalities are located in Wayne Township, although the census-designated place of Good Hope lies in the township's center.

== Name and history ==
It is one of twenty Wayne Townships statewide.

In 1833, Wayne Township contained one gristmill and two saw mills.

== Government ==
The township is governed by a three-member board of trustees, who are elected in November of odd-numbered years to a four-year term beginning on the following January 1. Two are elected in the year after the presidential election and one is elected in the year before it. There is also an elected township fiscal officer, who serves a four-year term beginning on April 1 of the year after the election, which is held in November of the year before the presidential election. Vacancies in the fiscal officership or on the board of trustees are filled by the remaining trustees.
