= Concord Township, Ohio =

Concord Township may refer to the following township in the U.S. state of Ohio:

- Concord Township, Champaign County, Ohio
- Concord Township, Delaware County, Ohio
- Concord Township, Fayette County, Ohio
- Concord Township, Highland County, Ohio
- Concord Township, Lake County, Ohio
- Concord Township, Miami County, Ohio
- Concord Township, Ross County, Ohio

== See also ==
- Concord Township (disambiguation)
