= Paint Township, Ross County, Ohio =

Township in Ohio, US

- Township
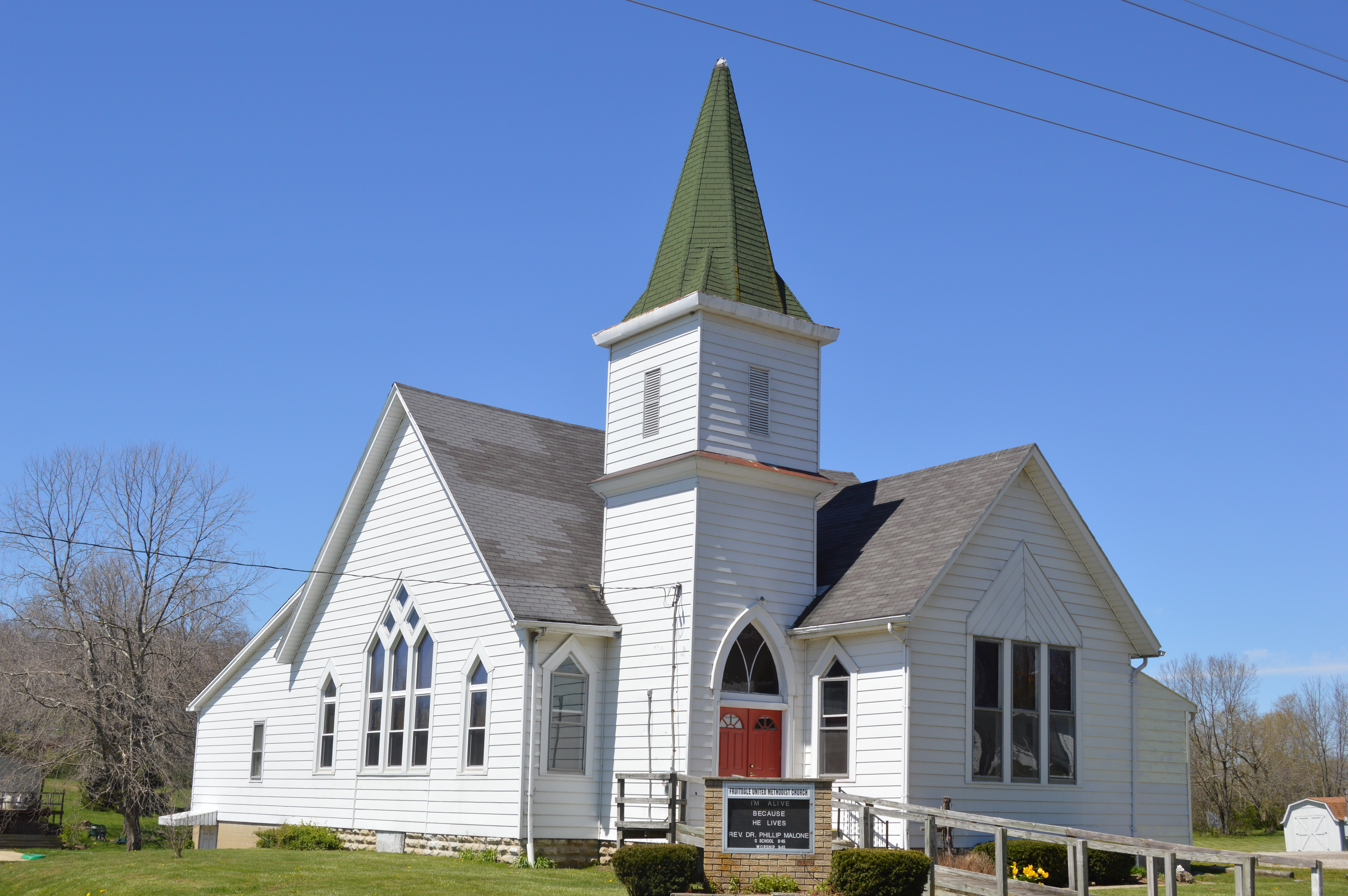
- Methodist church at Fruitdale

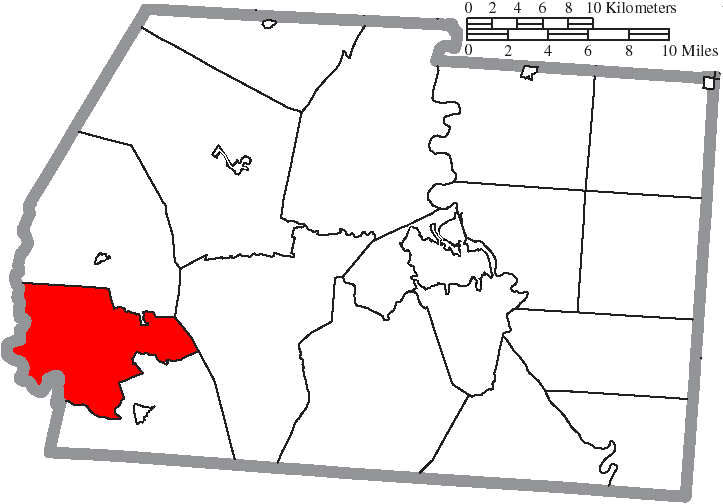
- Location of Paint Township in Ross County
- Coordinates: 39°16′24″N 83°18′40″W
- Country: United States
- State: Ohio
- County: Ross

Area
  - Total: 36.1 sq mi (93.6 km^{2})
  - Land: 35.5 sq mi (91.9 km^{2})
  - Water: 0.62 sq mi (1.6 km^{2})
- Elevation: 801 ft (244 m)

Population (2020)
  - Total: 1,288
  - Density: 36/sq mi (14/km^{2})
- Time zone: UTC-5 (Eastern (EST))
  - Summer (DST): UTC-4 (EDT)
- FIPS code: 39-59542
- GNIS feature ID: 1086901

Paint Township is one of the sixteen townships of Ross County, Ohio, United States. The 2020 census found 1,288 people in the township.

== Geography ==
Located in the southwestern part of the county, it borders the following townships:

- Buckskin Township - north
- Twin Township - northeast
- Paxton Township - south
- Paint Township, Highland County - southwest
- Madison Township, Highland County - northwest

No municipalities are located in Paint Township.

== Name and history ==
Paint Township takes its name from Paint Creek. It is one of six Paint Townships statewide.

== Government ==
The township is governed by a three-member board of trustees, who are elected in November of odd-numbered years to a four-year term beginning on the following January 1. Two are elected in the year after the presidential election and one is elected in the year before it. There is also an elected township fiscal officer, who serves a four-year term beginning on April 1 of the year after the election, which is held in November of the year before the presidential election. Vacancies in the fiscal officership or on the board of trustees are filled by the remaining trustees.
