= Green Township, Fayette County, Ohio =

Township in Ohio, US

- Township
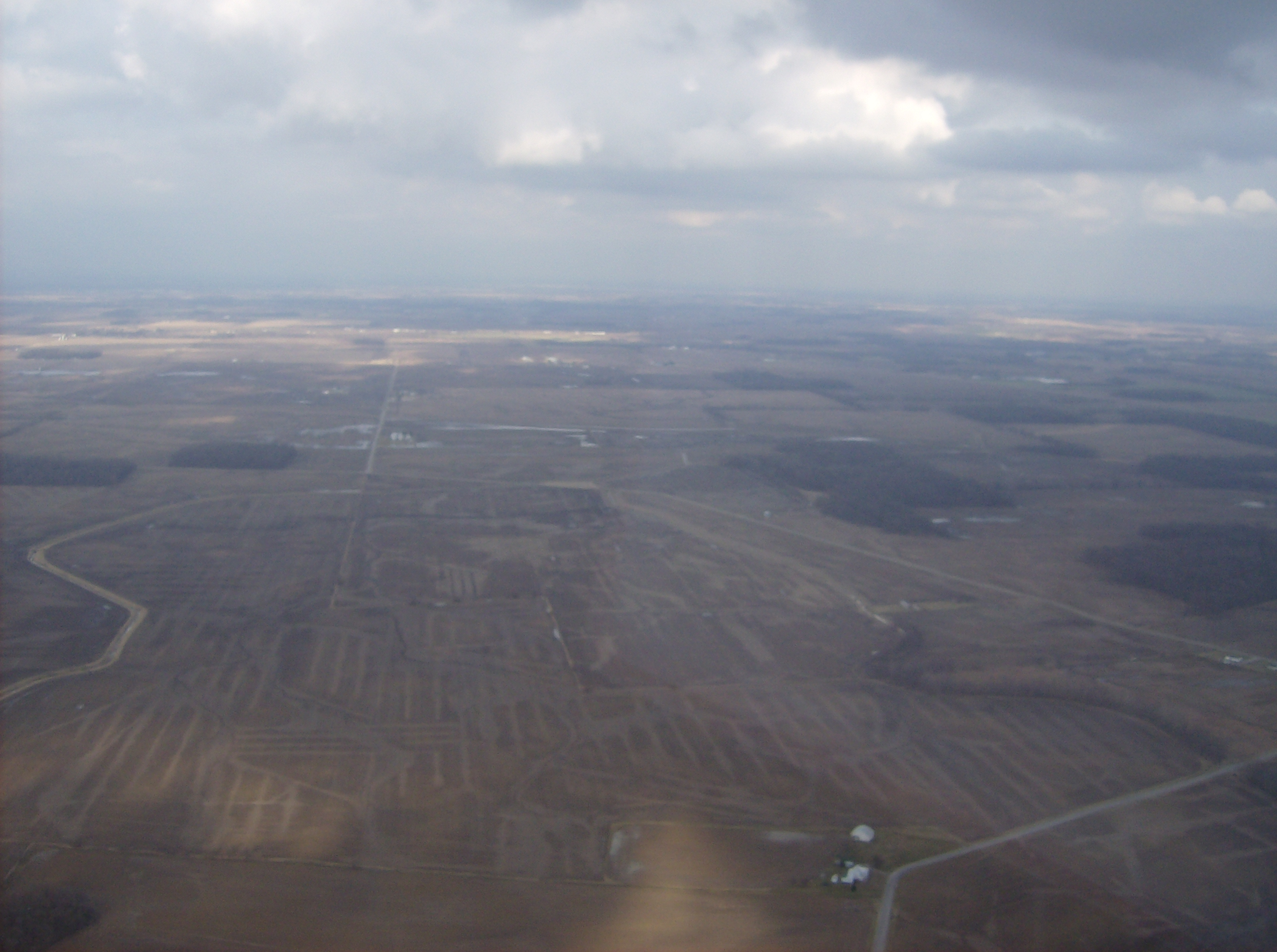
- Countryside in northern Green Township

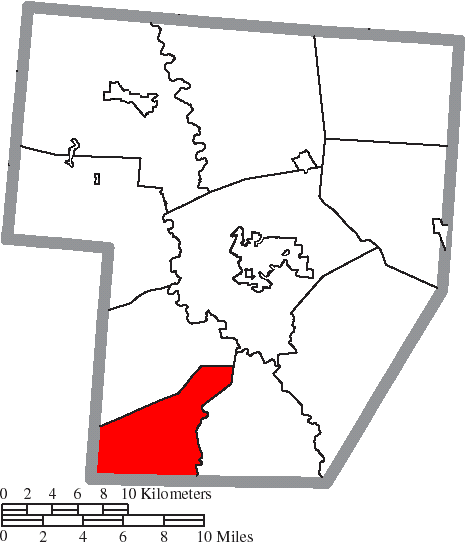
- Location of Green Township in Fayette County
- Coordinates: 39°25′46″N 83°31′46″W
- Country: United States
- State: Ohio
- County: Fayette

Area
  - Total: 22.0 sq mi (57.1 km^{2})
  - Land: 22.0 sq mi (57.1 km^{2})
  - Water: 0 sq mi (0.0 km^{2})
- Elevation: 1,037 ft (316 m)

Population (2020)
  - Total: 521
  - Density: 24/sq mi (9.3/km^{2})
- Time zone: UTC-5 (Eastern (EST))
  - Summer (DST): UTC-4 (EDT)
- FIPS code: 39-31724
- GNIS feature ID: 1086087

Green Township is one of the ten townships of Fayette County, Ohio, United States. As of the 2020 census the population was 521.

== Geography ==
Located in the southwestern corner of the county, it borders the following townships:

- Concord Township - north
- Perry Township - east
- Madison Township, Highland County - southeast
- Fairfield Township, Highland County - south
- Wayne Township, Clinton County - west

No municipalities are located in Green Township.

== Name and history ==
It is one of sixteen Green Townships statewide.

== Government ==
The township is governed by a three-member board of trustees, who are elected in November of odd-numbered years to a four-year term beginning on the following January 1. Two are elected in the year after the presidential election and one is elected in the year before it. There is also an elected township fiscal officer, who serves a four-year term beginning on April 1 of the year after the election, which is held in November of the year before the presidential election. Vacancies in the fiscal officership or on the board of trustees are filled by the remaining trustees.
