= Paxton Township, Ross County, Ohio =

Township in Ohio, US

- Township
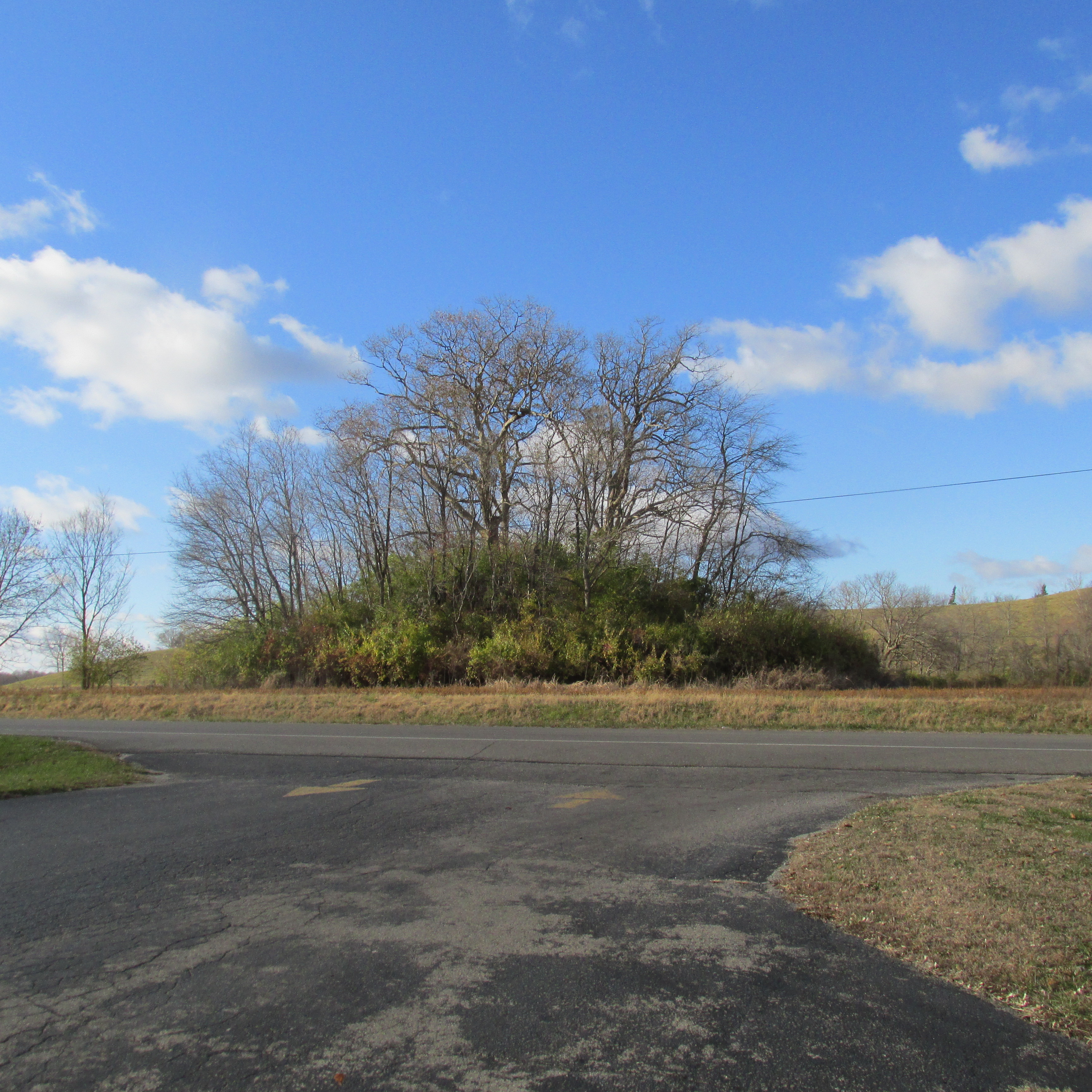
- T.C. Campbell Mound

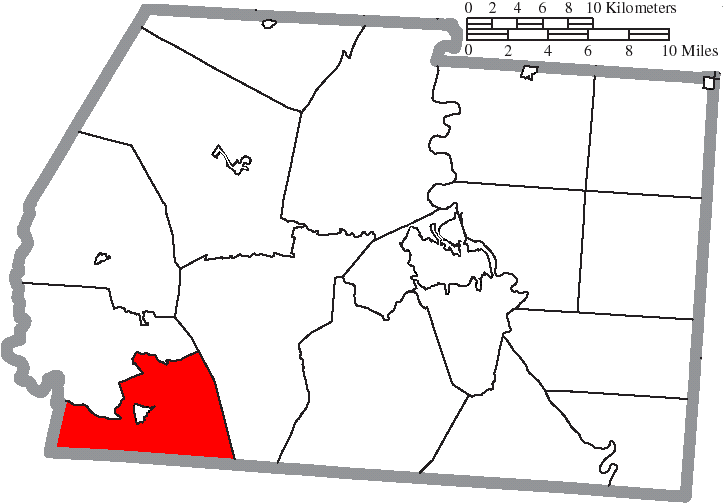
- Location of Paxton Township in Ross County
- Coordinates: 39°13′37″N 83°16′15″W
- Country: United States
- State: Ohio
- County: Ross

Area
  - Total: 31.8 sq mi (82.4 km^{2})
  - Land: 31.7 sq mi (82.2 km^{2})
  - Water: 0.077 sq mi (0.2 km^{2})
- Elevation: 810 ft (247 m)

Population (2020)
  - Total: 1,918
  - Density: 60/sq mi (23.3/km^{2})
- Time zone: UTC-5 (Eastern (EST))
  - Summer (DST): UTC-4 (EDT)
- FIPS code: 39-61308
- GNIS feature ID: 1086902
- Website: http://paxtontownship.com/

Paxton Township is one of the sixteen townships of Ross County, Ohio, United States. The 2020 census found 1,918 people in the township.

== Geography ==
Located in the southwestern corner of the county, it borders the following townships:

- Paint Township - north
- Twin Township - east
- Benton Township, Pike County - southeast
- Perry Township, Pike County - southwest
- Paint Township, Highland County - west

The village of Bainbridge is located in central Paxton Township.

== Name and history ==
It is the only Paxton Township statewide.

== Government ==
The township is governed by a three-member board of trustees, who are elected in November of odd-numbered years to a four-year term beginning on the following January 1. Two are elected in the year after the presidential election and one is elected in the year before it. There is also an elected township fiscal officer, who serves a four-year term beginning on April 1 of the year after the election, which is held in November of the year before the presidential election. Vacancies in the fiscal officership or on the board of trustees are filled by the remaining trustees.

== Education ==
Bainbridge Elementary School (now a preschool) is in Bainbridge, and the Paint Valley High School falls within the township.
