= Biers Run =

Stream in Ohio, U.S.

Coordinates: 39°21′26″N 83°03′55″W

Biers Run is a stream in the U.S. state of Ohio. It is a tributary of Paint Creek.

A small community of the same name once stood near the banks of Biers Run. The location of Bier post office is unknown to the GNIS.

== See also ==
- List of rivers of Ohio
