= Concord Township, Ross County, Ohio =

Township in Ohio, US

- Township
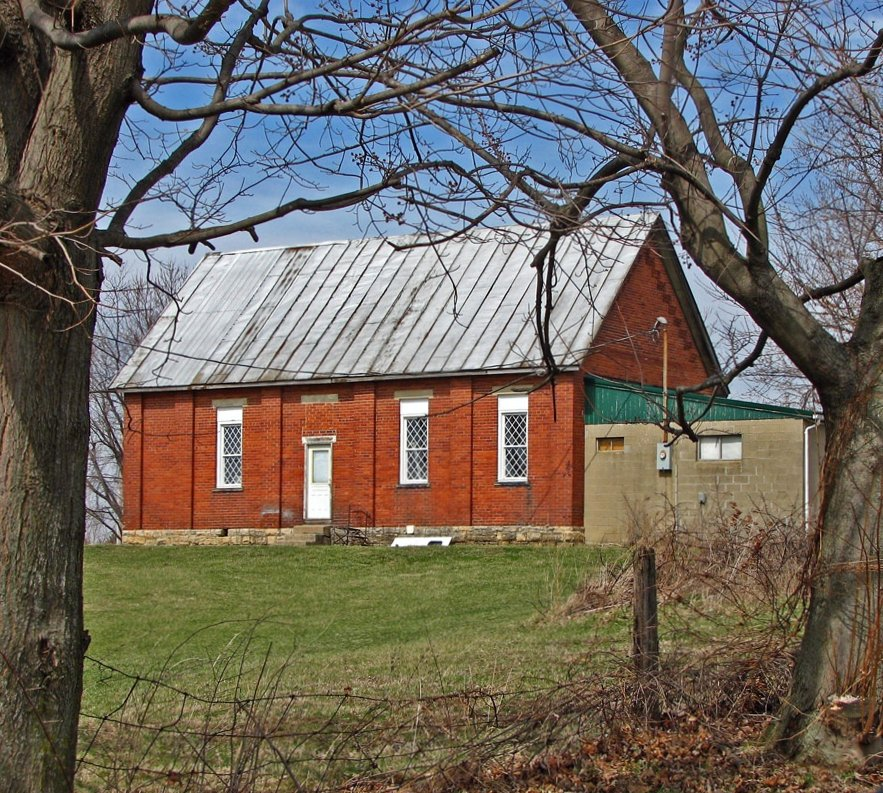
- Former school at Roxabell

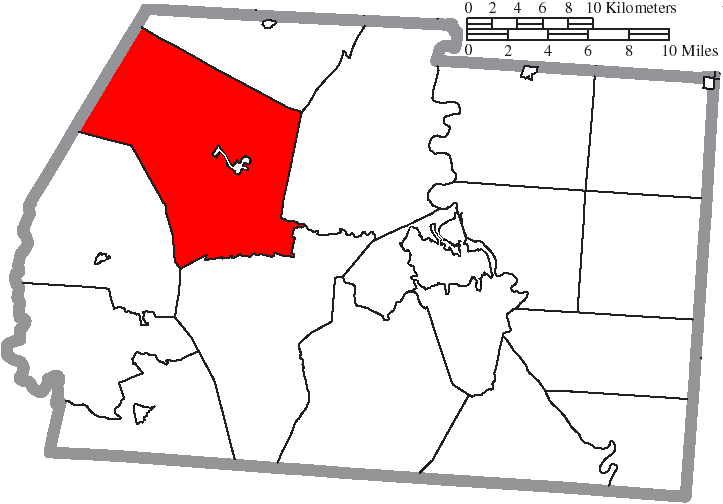
- Location of Concord Township in Ross County
- Coordinates: 39°24′32″N 83°12′19″W
- Country: United States
- State: Ohio
- County: Ross

Area
  - Total: 75.7 sq mi (196.1 km^{2})
  - Land: 75.7 sq mi (196.1 km^{2})
  - Water: 0 sq mi (0.0 km^{2})
- Elevation: 738 ft (225 m)

Population (2020)
  - Total: 4,743
  - Density: 62.64/sq mi (24.19/km^{2})
- Time zone: UTC-5 (Eastern (EST))
  - Summer (DST): UTC-4 (EDT)
- FIPS code: 39-18238
- GNIS feature ID: 1086893
- Website: https://www.concordross.org/

Concord Township is one of the sixteen townships of Ross County, Ohio, United States. The 2020 census found 4,743 people in the township.

== Geography ==
Located in the northwestern part of the county, it borders the following townships:

- Deerfield Township - north
- Union Township - east
- Twin Township - southeast
- Buckskin Township - southwest
- Wayne Township, Fayette County - northwest

The village of Frankfort is located in central Concord Township, as is the unincorporated community of Roxabell.

== Name and history ==
It is one of seven Concord Townships statewide.

== Government ==
The township is governed by a three-member board of trustees, who are elected in November of odd-numbered years to a four-year term beginning on the following January 1. Two are elected in the year after the presidential election and one is elected in the year before it. There is also an elected township fiscal officer, who serves a four-year term beginning on April 1 of the year after the election, which is held in November of the year before the presidential election. Vacancies in the fiscal officership or on the board of trustees are filled by the remaining trustees.
