= Twin Township, Ross County, Ohio =

Township in Ohio, US

- Township
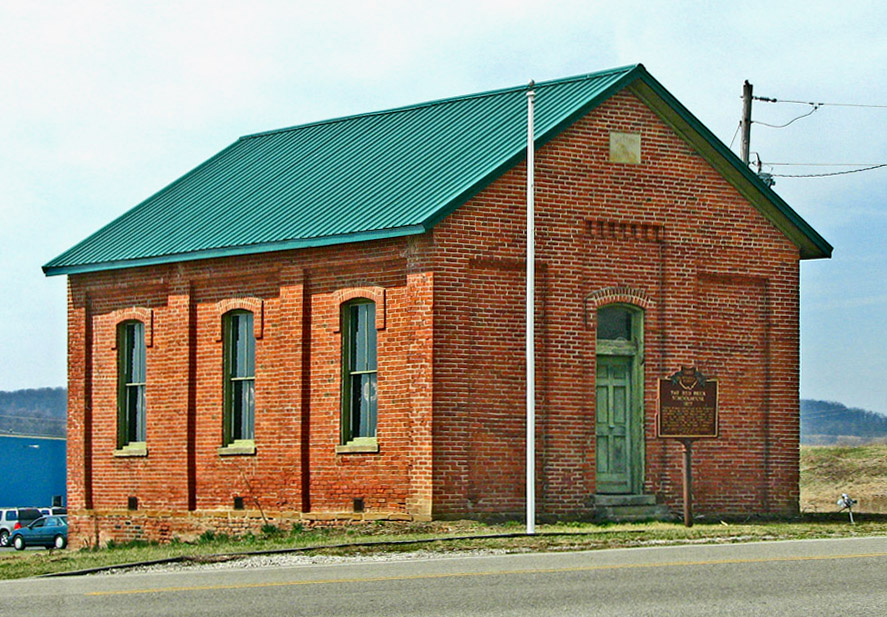
- Former school in the township

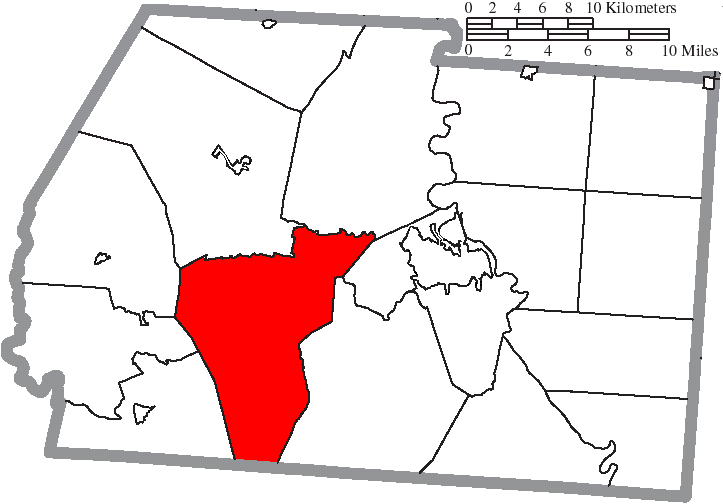
- Location of Twin Township in Ross County
- Coordinates: 39°17′46″N 83°8′37″W
- Country: United States
- State: Ohio
- County: Ross

Area
  - Total: 60.2 sq mi (155.9 km^{2})
  - Land: 60.2 sq mi (155.8 km^{2})
  - Water: 0.039 sq mi (0.1 km^{2})
- Elevation: 735 ft (224 m)

Population (2020)
  - Total: 3,492
  - Density: 58/sq mi (22.4/km^{2})
- Time zone: UTC-5 (Eastern (EST))
  - Summer (DST): UTC-4 (EDT)
- FIPS code: 39-78008
- GNIS feature ID: 1086905
- Website: http://www.twintownship.org/

Twin Township is one of the sixteen townships of Ross County, Ohio, United States. The 2020 census found 3,492 people in the township.

== Geography ==
Located in the south central part of the county, it borders the following townships:

- Concord Township - north
- Union Township - northeast, north of Scioto Township
- Scioto Township - northeast, south of Union Township
- Huntington Township - east
- Pebble Township, Pike County - southeast
- Benton Township, Pike County - south
- Paxton Township - southwest
- Paint Township - west
- Buckskin Township - northwest

No municipalities are located in Twin Township, although the census-designated place of Bourneville lies in the township's center.

== Name and history ==
Statewide, other Twin Townships are located in Darke and Preble counties.

== Government ==
The township is governed by a three-member board of trustees, who are elected in November of odd-numbered years to a four-year term beginning on the following January 1. Two are elected in the year after the presidential election and one is elected in the year before it. There is also an elected township fiscal officer, who serves a four-year term beginning on April 1 of the year after the election, which is held in November of the year before the presidential election. Vacancies in the fiscal officership or on the board of trustees are filled by the remaining trustees.
