= Frankfort, Ohio =

- Village
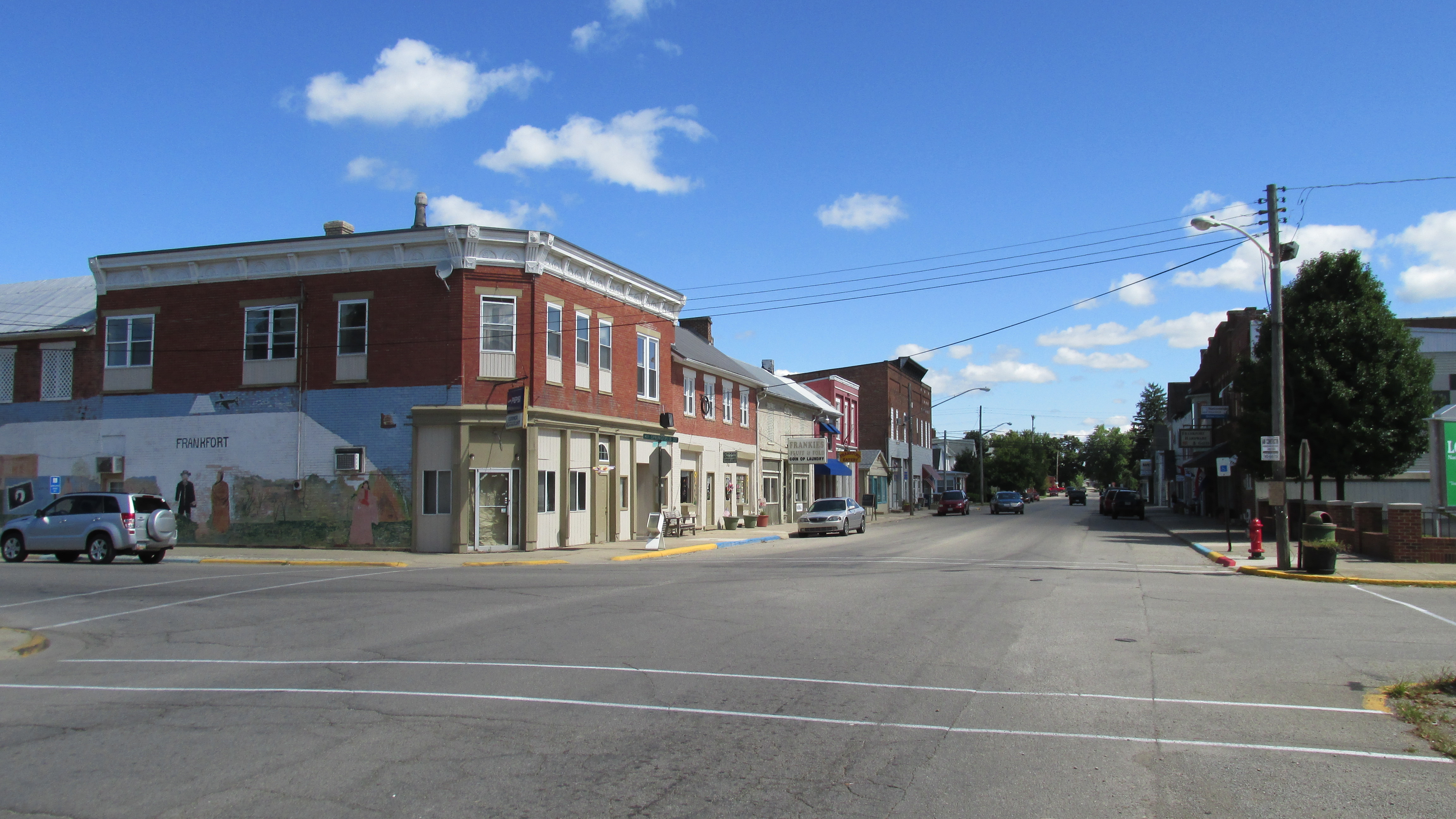
- Looking north at the intersection of Main Street and Springfield Street in Frankfort.

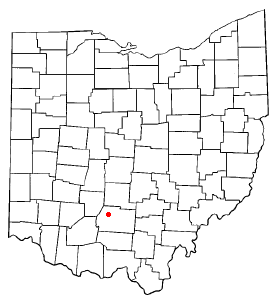
- Location of Frankfort, Ohio

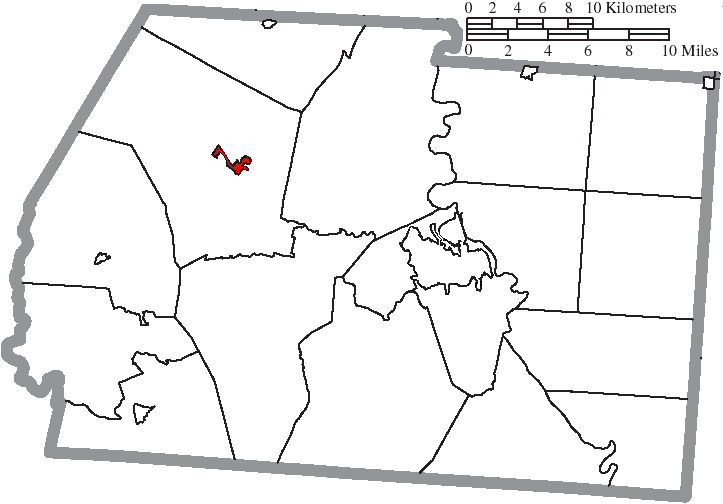
- Location of Frankfort in Ross County
- Coordinates: 39°24′23″N 83°11′00″W
- Country: United States
- State: Ohio
- County: Ross

Government
  - Type: Mayor-council government
  - Mayor: Patti Cavendar
  - Village Administrator: Matt Downing

Area
  - Total: 0.50 sq mi (1.30 km^{2})
  - Land: 0.50 sq mi (1.30 km^{2})
  - Water: 0 sq mi (0.00 km^{2})
- Elevation: 742 ft (226 m)

Population (2020)
  - Total: 1,084
  - Estimate (2023): 1,107
  - Density: 2,158/sq mi (833.1/km^{2})
- Time zone: UTC-5 (Eastern (EST))
  - Summer (DST): UTC-4 (EDT)
- ZIP code: 45628
- Area code: 740
- FIPS code: 39-28182
- GNIS feature ID: 2398914
- Website: https://frankfortohio.com/

Frankfort is a village in Ross County, Ohio, United States, along the North Fork of Paint Creek. The village is located in Concord Township. The population was 1,084 at the 2020 census.

== History ==
Frankfort was originally called Oldtown, and under the latter name was laid out in 1816. A post office called Old Town was established in 1817, and the name was changed to Frankfort in 1834. Frankfort was incorporated as a village in 1827.

== Geography ==
According to the United States Census Bureau, the village has a total area of 0.56 square miles (1.45 km^{2}), all land.

== Demographics ==
Historical population
Census	Pop.	Note	%±
1850	553		—
1860	551		−0.4%
1870	519		−5.8%
1880	548		5.6%
1890	667		21.7%
1900	717		7.5%
1910	734		2.4%
1920	776		5.7%
1930	764		−1.5%
1940	839		9.8%
1950	869		3.6%
1960	871		0.2%
1970	949		9.0%
1980	1,008		6.2%
1990	1,065		5.7%
2000	1,011		−5.1%
2010	1,064		5.2%
2020	1,084		1.9%
2023 (est.)	1,107	▲	2.1%
U.S. Decennial Census

=== 2010 census ===
As of the census of 2010, there were 1,064 people, 448 households, and 279 families living in the village. The population density was 1,900.0 inhabitants per square mile (733.6/km^{2}). There were 511 housing units at an average density of 912.5 per square mile (352.3/km^{2}). The racial makeup of the village was 92.6% White, 3.9% African American, 0.7% Native American, 0.4% Asian, 0.1% from other races, and 2.4% from two or more races. Hispanic or Latino of any race were 0.2% of the population.

There were 448 households, of which 29.5% had children under the age of 18 living with them, 44.0% were married couples living together, 13.4% had a female householder with no husband present, 4.9% had a male householder with no wife present, and 37.7% were non-families. 34.2% of all households were made up of individuals, and 19.6% had someone living alone who was 65 years of age or older. The average household size was 2.35 and the average family size was 3.00.

The median age in the village was 41.2 years. 24.1% of residents were under the age of 18; 7.2% were between the ages of 18 and 24; 23.9% were from 25 to 44; 25.9% were from 45 to 64; and 18.8% were 65 years of age or older. The gender makeup of the village was 47.0% male and 53.0% female.

=== 2000 census ===
As of the census of 2000, there were 1,011 people, 442 households, and 274 families living in the village. The population density was 1,792.9 inhabitants per square mile (692.2/km^{2}). There were 474 housing units at an average density of 840.6 per square mile (324.6/km^{2}). The racial makeup of the village was 91.89% White, 4.85% African American, 0.20% Native American, 0.20% Asian, and 2.87% from two or more races. Hispanic or Latino of any race were 0.10% of the population.

There were 442 households, out of which 29.4% had children under the age of 18 living with them, 45.7% were married couples living together, 13.3% had a female householder with no husband present, and 38.0% were non-families. 35.3% of all households were made up of individuals, and 19.7% had someone living alone who was 65 years of age or older. The average household size was 2.29 and the average family size was 2.95.

In the village, the population was spread out, with 24.3% under the age of 18, 7.6% from 18 to 24, 28.0% from 25 to 44, 22.4% from 45 to 64, and 17.7% who were 65 years of age or older. The median age was 40 years. For every 100 females there were 89.0 males. For every 100 females age 18 and over, there were 78.7 males.

The median income for a household in the village was $32,262, and the median income for a family was $43,365. Males had a median income of $34,417 versus $22,000 for females. The per capita income for the village was $16,259. About 11.6% of families and 16.7% of the population were below the poverty line, including 20.1% of those under age 18 and 25.4% of those age 65 or over.

== Education ==
Frankfort is served by the Adena Local School System, a K-12 school that jointly serves Concord, Union, and Deerfield townships. In the 2024-2025 school year, Adena High School had a weighted graduation rate of 93.2%.

Frankfort has a public library, a branch of the Chillicothe & Ross County Public Library.

== Gallery ==
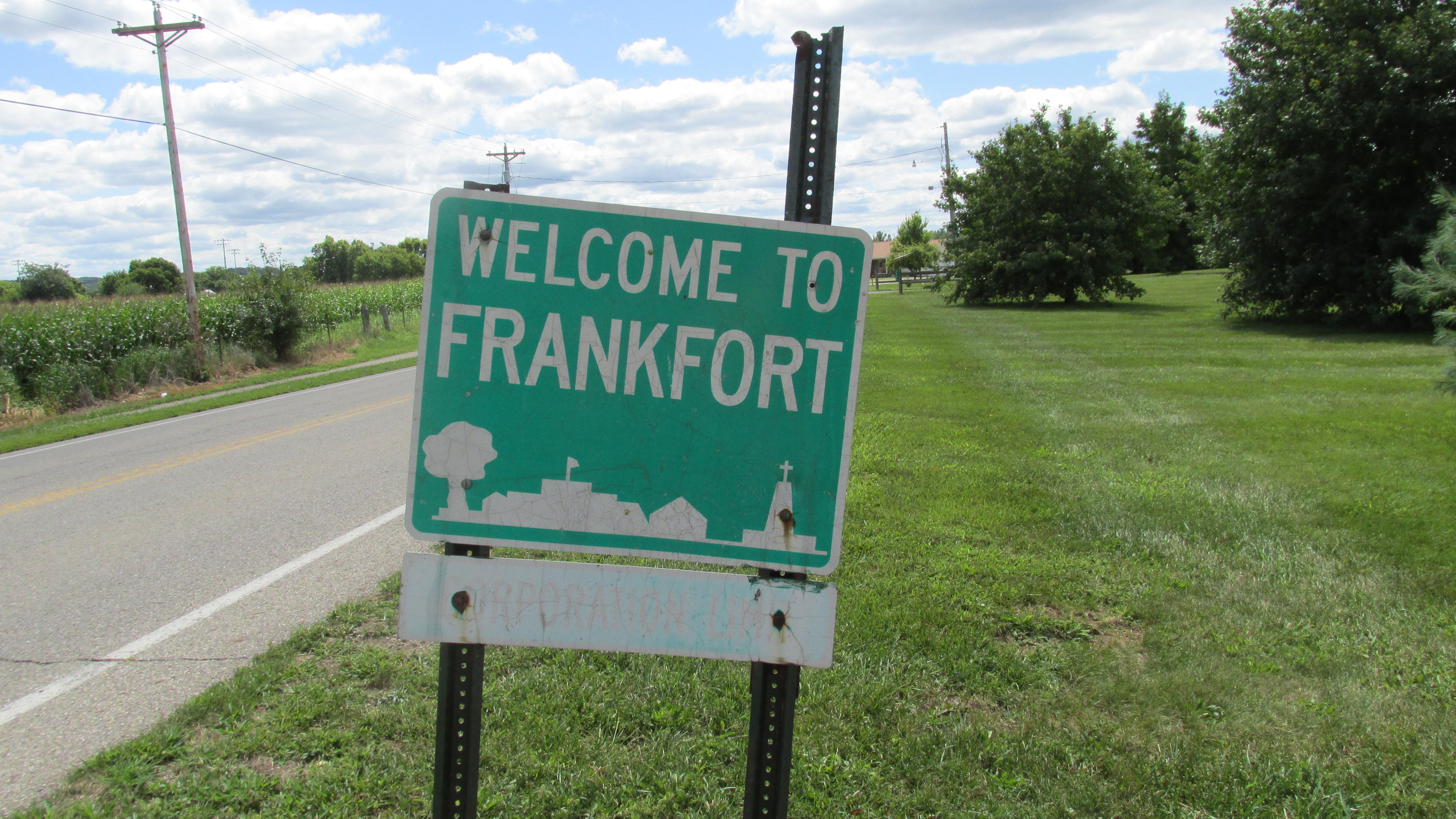
Frankfort corporation limit sign

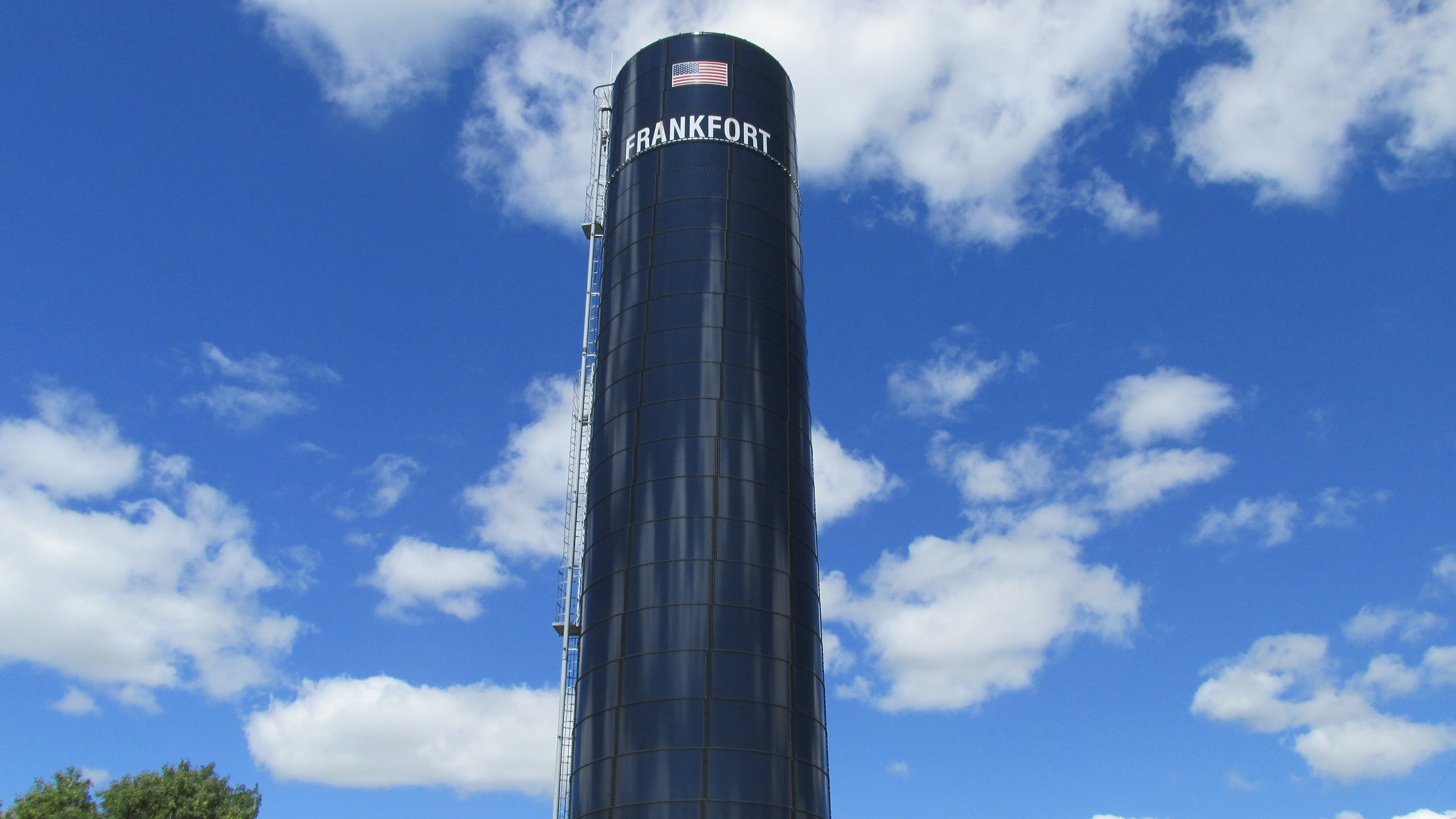
Water tower in Frankfort

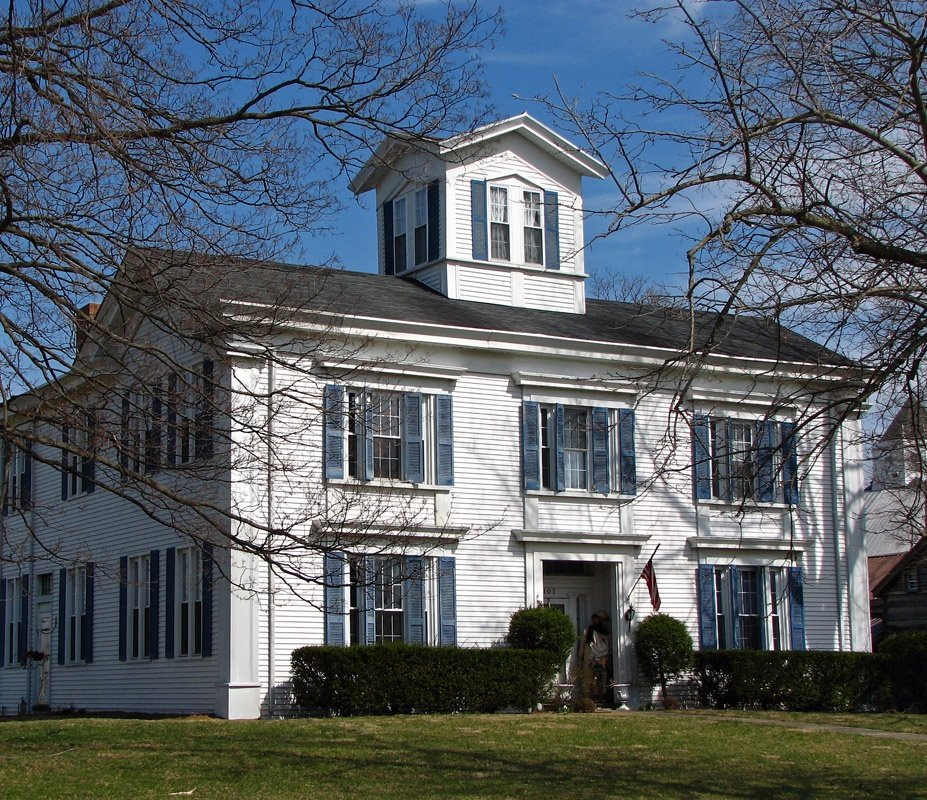
House in Frankfort

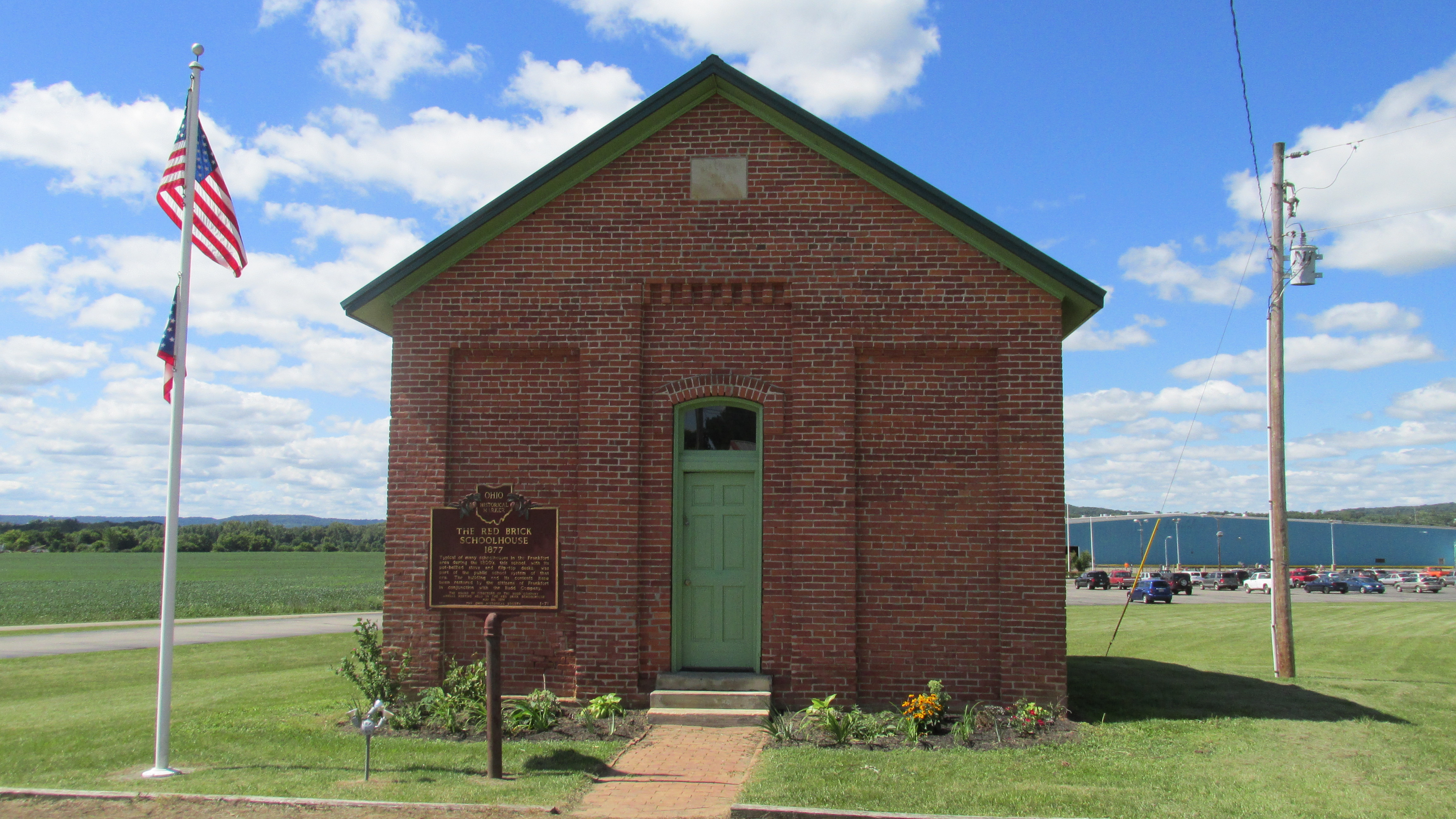
The Red Brick Schoolhouse, constructed in 1877, in Frankfort

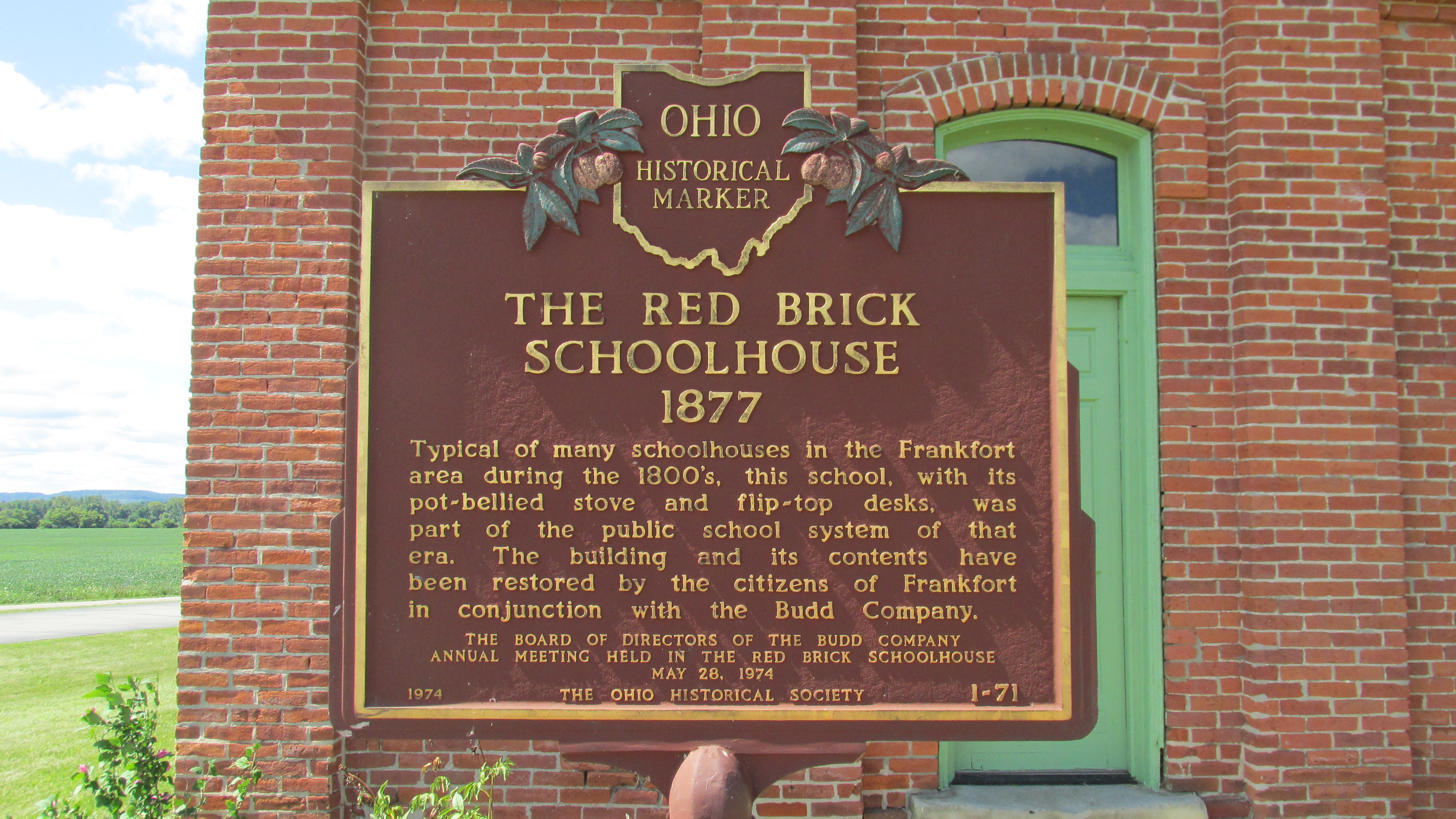
Ohio Historical Marker at the Red Brick Schoolhouse
