= Perry Township, Fayette County, Ohio =

Township in Ohio, US

- Township
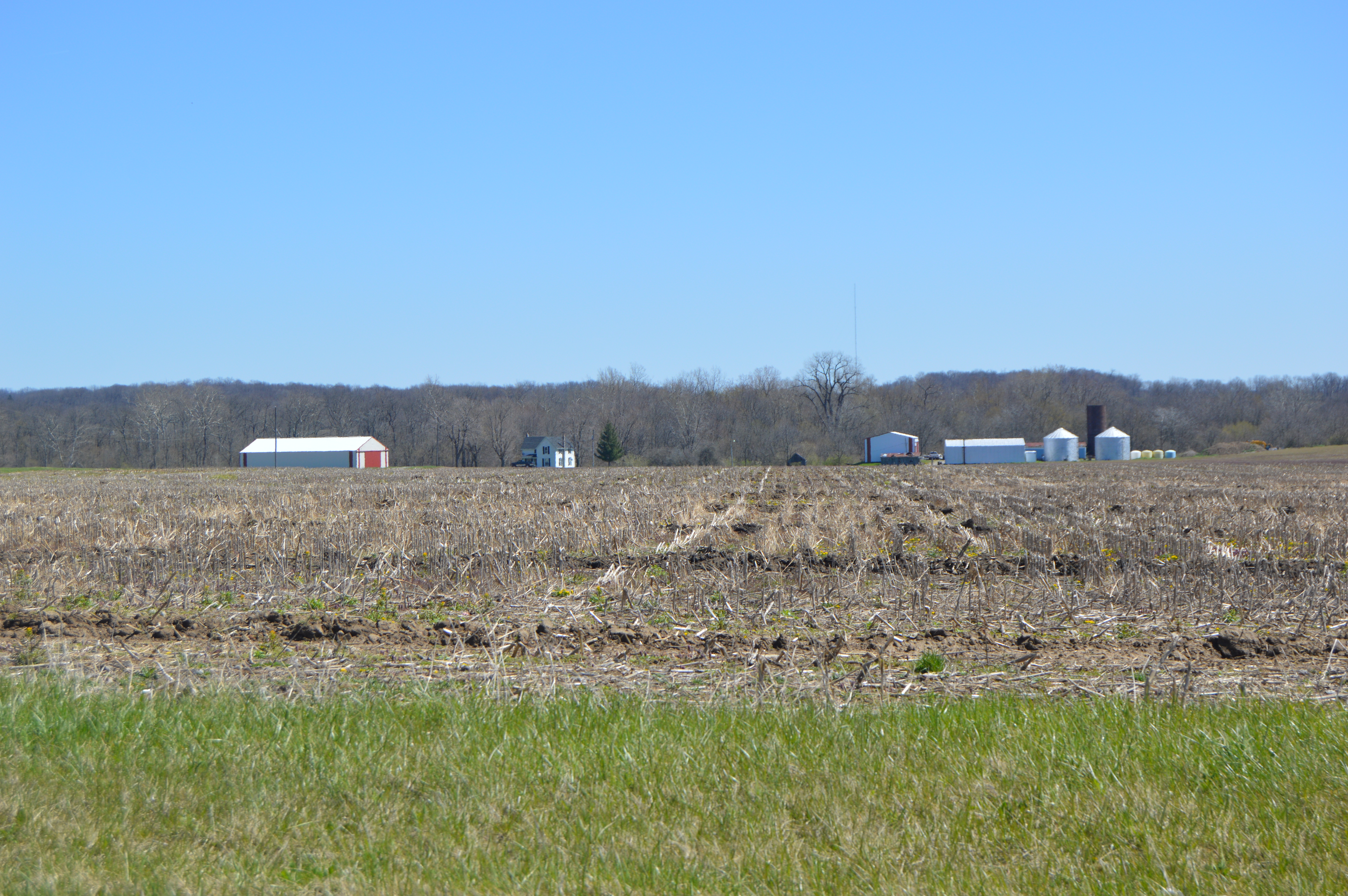
- Agricultural fields in the township's southeast

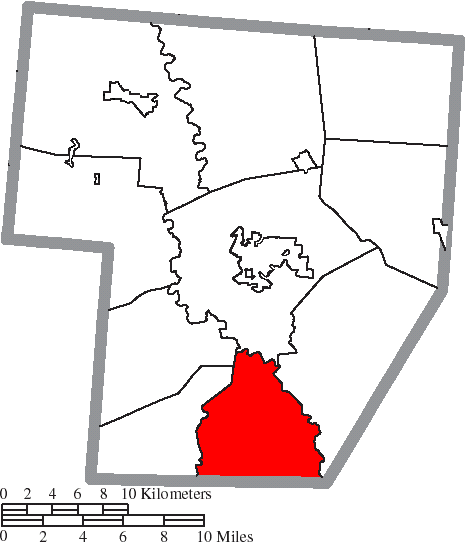
- Location of Perry Township in Fayette County
- Coordinates: 39°24′30″N 83°26′26″W
- Country: United States
- State: Ohio
- County: Fayette

Area
  - Total: 28.7 sq mi (74.3 km^{2})
  - Land: 28.7 sq mi (74.3 km^{2})
  - Water: 0 sq mi (0.0 km^{2})
- Elevation: 1,007 ft (307 m)

Population (2020)
  - Total: 1,118
  - Density: 39.0/sq mi (15.0/km^{2})
- Time zone: UTC-5 (Eastern (EST))
  - Summer (DST): UTC-4 (EDT)
- FIPS code: 39-61826
- GNIS feature ID: 1086093

Perry Township is one of the ten townships of Fayette County, Ohio, United States. As of the 2020 census the population was 1,118.

== Geography ==
Located in the southern part of the county, it borders the following townships:

- Union Township - north
- Wayne Township - northeast
- Buckskin Township, Ross County - southeast corner
- Madison Township, Highland County - south
- Green Township - west
- Concord Township - northwest

No municipalities are located in Perry Township.

== Name and history ==
It is one of twenty-six Perry Townships statewide.

== Government ==
The township is governed by a three-member board of trustees, who are elected in November of odd-numbered years to a four-year term beginning on the following January 1. Two are elected in the year after the presidential election and one is elected in the year before it. There is also an elected township fiscal officer, who serves a four-year term beginning on April 1 of the year after the election, which is held in November of the year before the presidential election. Vacancies in the fiscal officership or on the board of trustees are filled by the remaining trustees.
