= Fairfield High School (Leesburg, Ohio) =

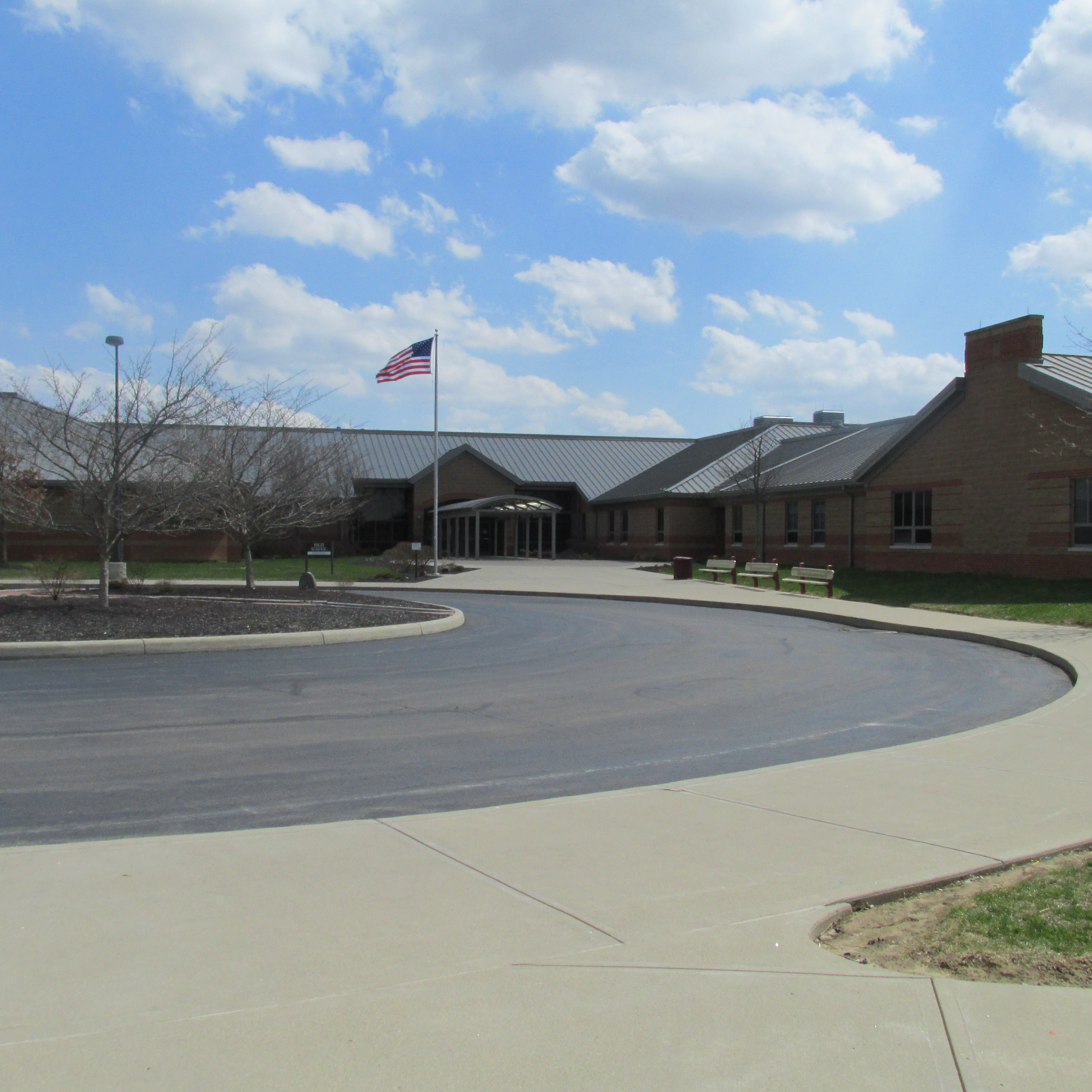
- Fairfield High School Building

Location
- 11611 State Route 771; Leesburg, (Highland County), Ohio 45135; United States
- Coordinates: 39°19′44″N 83°32′46″W

Information
- Type: Public, high school
- Established: c1822
- School district: Fairfield Local School District
- Superintendent: Kesia McCoy
- School code: 390476202929
- Principal: Stephen Hackett
- Teaching staff: 13.00 (FTE)
- Grades: 9-12
- Student to teacher ratio: 19.08
- Colors: Red and White
- Athletics conference: Southern Hills Athletic League
- Team name: Lions
- Communities served: Leesburg, Ohio, Highland, Ohio, East Monroe, Ohio, Centerfield, Ohio
- Athletic Director: James Barnett
- Website: https://www.fairfieldlocal.org/71650

Fairfield High School (FHS) is located just south of Leesburg, Ohio. It is the only high school in the Fairfield Local School District.

== Athletics ==
The school's mascot for the boys teams is the Lion and their official colors are red and white. The girls' teams are the Lady Lions. Their athletic teams belong to the Ohio High School Athletic Association and the Southern Hills Athletic League.
