= Leesburg, Ohio =

- Village
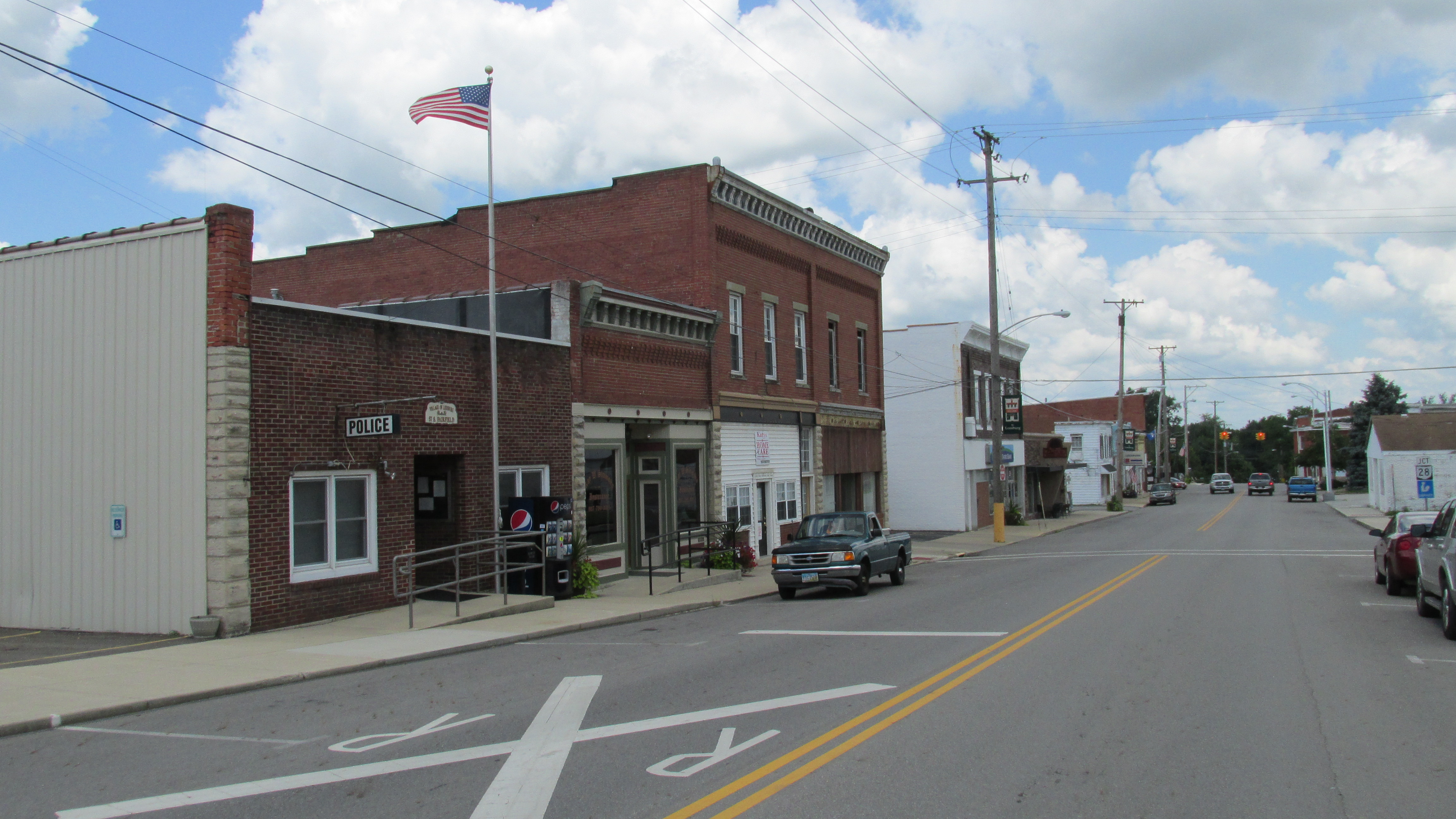
- Business district
- Nickname: The Friendly Village
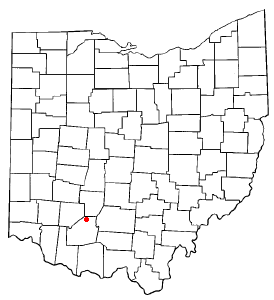
- Location of Leesburg, Ohio

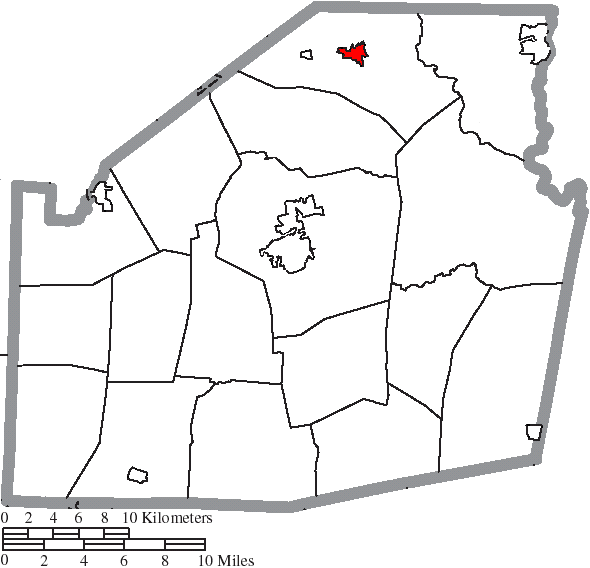
- Location of Leesburg in Highland County
- Coordinates: 39°20′31″N 83°33′07″W
- Country: United States
- State: Ohio
- County: Highland

Government
  - Type: Mayor-council government
  - Mayor: Rita Smith-Daulton

Area
  - Total: 1.17 sq mi (3.03 km^{2})
  - Land: 1.17 sq mi (3.03 km^{2})
  - Water: 0 sq mi (0.00 km^{2})
- Elevation: 1,024 ft (312 m)

Population (2020)
  - Total: 1,273
  - Density: 1,089.7/sq mi (420.72/km^{2})
- Time zone: UTC-5 (Eastern (EST))
  - Summer (DST): UTC-4 (EDT)
- ZIP code: 45135
- Area codes: 937, 326
- FIPS code: 39-42476
- GNIS feature ID: 2398411
- Website: leesburgohio.org

Leesburg is a village in Highland County, Ohio, United States. The population was 1,273 at the 2020 census.

== History ==
Leesburg was laid out in 1802, and named after Leesburg, Virginia.

== Geography ==
According to the United States Census Bureau, the village has a total area of 1.17 square miles (3.03 km^{2}), all land.

== Demographics ==
Historical population
Census	Pop.	Note	%±
1820	131		—
1830	218		66.4%
1870	508		—
1880	513		1.0%
1890	617		20.3%
1900	783		26.9%
1910	828		5.7%
1920	849		2.5%
1930	830		−2.2%
1940	839		1.1%
1950	841		0.2%
1960	932		10.8%
1970	984		5.6%
1980	1,019		3.6%
1990	1,063		4.3%
2000	1,253		17.9%
2010	1,314		4.9%
2020	1,273		−3.1%
U.S. Decennial Census

=== 2010 census ===
As of the census of 2010, there were 1,314 people, 513 households, and 344 families living in the village. The population density was 1,123.1 inhabitants per square mile (433.6/km^{2}). There were 579 housing units at an average density of 494.9 per square mile (191.1/km^{2}). The racial makeup of the village was 97.6% White, 0.2% African American, 0.5% Native American, 0.1% Asian, and 1.6% from two or more races. Hispanic or Latino of any race were 0.7% of the population.

There were 513 households, of which 38.8% had children under the age of 18 living with them, 43.9% were married couples living together, 15.2% had a female householder with no husband present, 8.0% had a male householder with no wife present, and 32.9% were non-families. 26.3% of all households were made up of individuals, and 12.4% had someone living alone who was 65 years of age or older. The average household size was 2.56 and the average family size was 3.06.

The median age in the village was 33.8 years. 28.4% of residents were under the age of 18; 8.5% were between the ages of 18 and 24; 28.3% were from 25 to 44; 21.9% were from 45 to 64; and 12.9% were 65 years of age or older. The gender makeup of the village was 47.4% male and 52.6% female.

=== 2000 census ===
As of the census of 2000, there were 1,253 people, 501 households, and 344 families living in the village. The population density was 1,560.0 inhabitants per square mile (602.3/km^{2}). There were 538 housing units at an average density of 669.8 per square mile (258.6/km^{2}). The racial makeup of the village was 98.48% White, 0.64% African American, 0.24% Native American, 0.08% Asian, 0.08% from other races, and 0.48% from two or more races. Hispanic or Latino of any race were 0.16% of the population.

There were 501 households, out of which 37.9% had children under the age of 18 living with them, 48.1% were married couples living together, 14.8% had a female householder with no husband present, and 31.3% were non-families. 26.3% of all households were made up of individuals, and 8.8% had someone living alone who was 65 years of age or older. The average household size was 2.50 and the average family size was 3.00.

In the village, the population was spread out, with 28.1% under the age of 18, 11.7% from 18 to 24, 30.0% from 25 to 44, 18.8% from 45 to 64, and 11.4% who were 65 years of age or older. The median age was 31 years. For every 100 females there were 97.3 males. For every 100 females age 18 and over, there were 91.3 males.

The median income for a household in the village was $34,653, and the median income for a family was $45,893. Males had a median income of $30,865 versus $22,112 for females. The per capita income for the village was $16,531. About 4.7% of families and 6.3% of the population were below the poverty line, including 4.7% of those under age 18 and 13.4% of those age 65 or over.

== Education ==
Fairfield Local Schools operates one elementary school, one middle school and high school (Fairfield High School), all combined. Fairfield Local Schools opened in 1824. This coming year marks Fairfield’s bicentennial.

Leesburg has a public library, a branch of the Highland County District Library.
