= Paint Township, Highland County, Ohio =

Township in Ohio, US

- Township
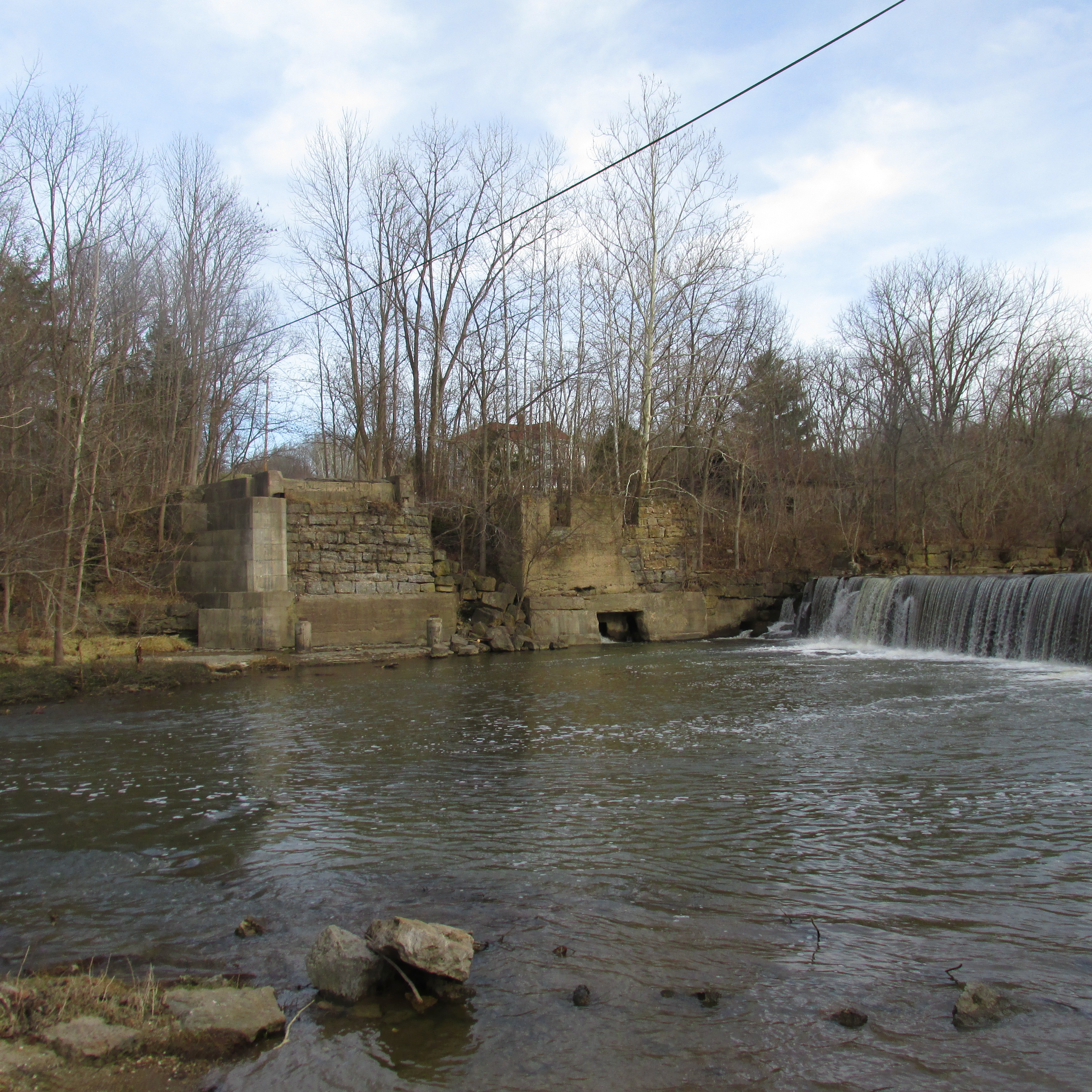
- Old mill site on Rocky Fork Creek

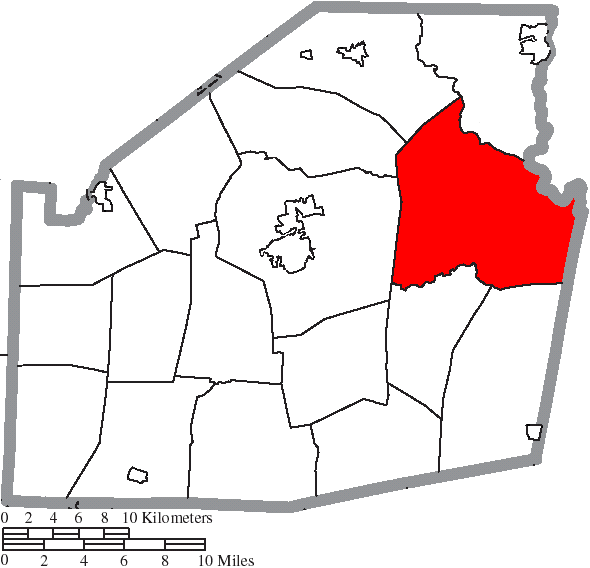
- Location of Paint Township in Highland County
- Coordinates: 39°13′13″N 83°26′39″W
- Country: United States
- State: Ohio
- County: Highland

Area
  - Total: 58.6 sq mi (151.8 km^{2})
  - Land: 55.8 sq mi (144.6 km^{2})
  - Water: 2.8 sq mi (7.2 km^{2})
- Elevation: 938 ft (286 m)

Population (2020)
  - Total: 4,850
  - Density: 86.9/sq mi (33.5/km^{2})
- Time zone: UTC-5 (Eastern (EST))
  - Summer (DST): UTC-4 (EDT)
- FIPS code: 39-59500
- GNIS feature ID: 1086310

Paint Township is one of the seventeen townships of Highland County, Ohio, United States. As of the 2020 census the population was 4,850.

== Geography ==
Located in the east part of the county, it borders the following townships:

- Madison Township - north
- Paint Township, Ross County - northeast
- Paxton Township, Ross County - east
- Perry Township, Pike County - southeast
- Brushcreek Township - south, east of Marshall Township
- Marshall Township - south, west of Brushcreek Township
- Liberty Township - southwest
- Penn Township - west
- Fairfield Township - northwest

No municipalities are located in Paint Township. The unincorporated community of Rainsboro is along US-50 in the township. The census-designated places of Highland Holiday and Rocky Fort Point are both located in the township's southern edge.

=== Major highways ===
- US 50

== Name and history ==
Paint Township takes its name from Paint Creek. It is one of six Paint Townships statewide.

== Government ==
The township is governed by a three-member board of trustees, who are elected in November of odd-numbered years to a four-year term beginning on the following January 1. Two are elected in the year after the presidential election and one is elected in the year before it. There is also an elected township fiscal officer, who serves a four-year term beginning on April 1 of the year after the election, which is held in November of the year before the presidential election. Vacancies in the fiscal officership or on the board of trustees are filled by the remaining trustees.
