= Paint Creek (Scioto River tributary) =

Coordinates: 39.2953°N 82.9332°W

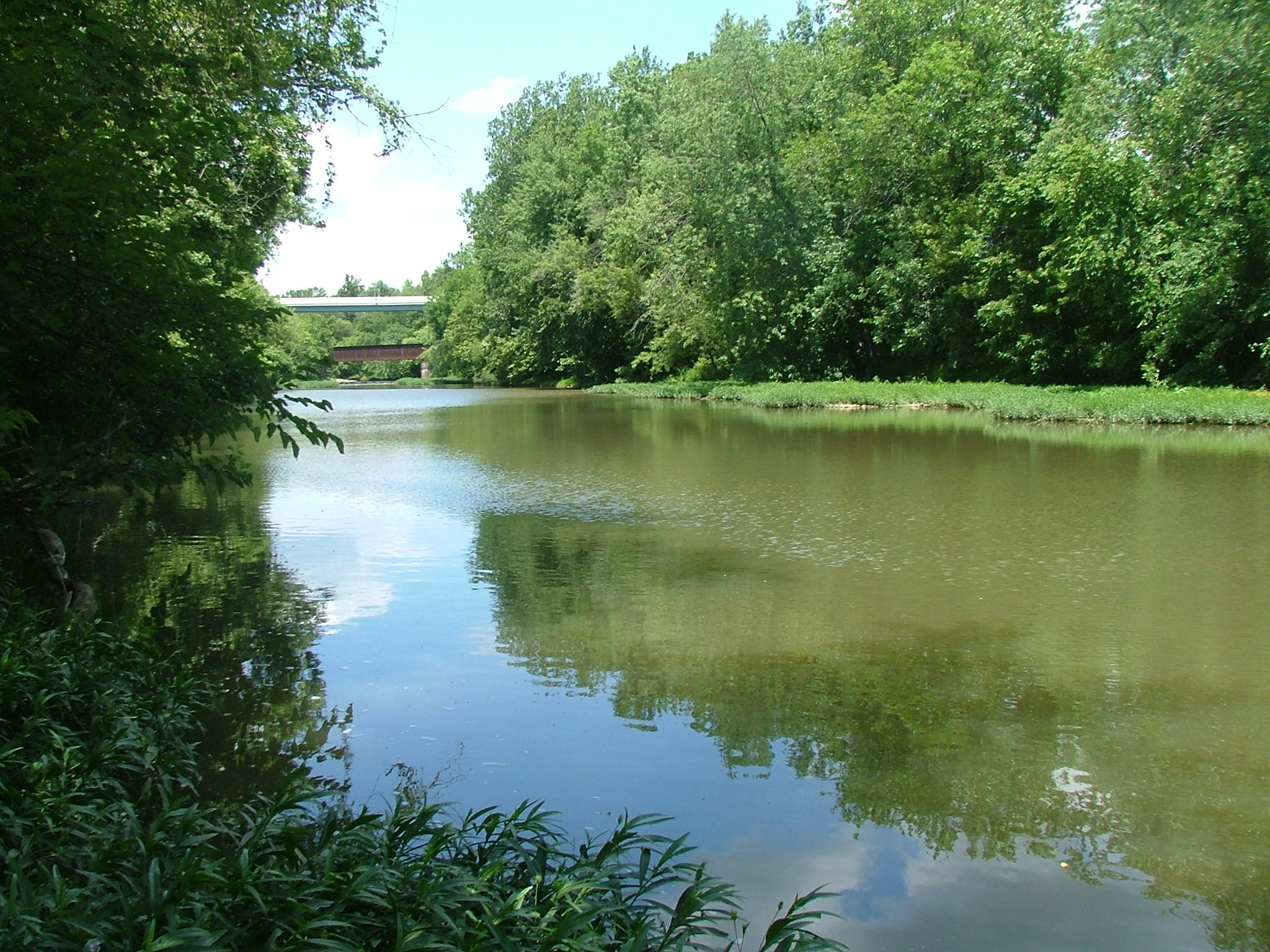
- Paint Creek at Greenfield

Physical characteristics
- Source
  - location: 5 mi (8.0 km) southwest of London
  - elevation: 1,100 ft (340 m)
- Mouth
  - location: Scioto River near Chillicothe
  - elevation: ~ 590 ft (180 m)
- Length: 94.7 mi (152.4 km)
- Basin size: 1,143 mi^{2} (2,960 km^{2})
- Discharge
  - location: Chillicothe
  - average: 1,368 cu ft/s (38.7 m^{3}/s), USGS water years 1986-2019

Basin features
- Tributaries
  - left: Biers Run

Map of Paint Creek highlighted within the Scioto River watershed.

Paint Creek is a tributary of the Scioto River, 94.7 miles (152.4 km) long, in south-central Ohio in the United States. Via the Scioto and Ohio Rivers, it is part of the watershed of the Mississippi River. It drains an area of 1,143 square miles (2,960 km^{2}).

Paint Creek rises in southwestern Madison County and flows initially south-southeastwardly through Fayette County and along the boundaries of Highland and Ross Counties, past the towns of Washington Court House and Greenfield. Downstream of Greenfield, a dam causes the stream to form Paint Creek Lake, part of Paint Creek State Park. Below the dam, Paint Creek flows eastwardly through Ross County, past Bainbridge and just to the south of Chillicothe to its confluence with the Scioto River.

== Tributaries ==
Principal tributaries include of Paint Creek include:

- Rattlesnake Creek flows to Paint Creek Lake.
- North Fork Paint Creek, 46.6 miles (75.0 km) long, rises in southeastern Madison County and flows generally southeastwardly through Fayette and Ross Counties, past Frankfort, to its confluence with Paint Creek near Chillicothe. The North Fork drains an area of 236 square miles (610 km^{2}).

== Variant names ==
According to the Geographic Names Information System, Paint Creek has also been known historically as:

- Alamoneetheepeece
- Chillicotha Creek
- Necunsia Skeintat (Found on Lewis Evans’ A General Map of the Middle British Colonies in America, published in 1755.)
- Olomon Sepung
- Olomoni Siipunk
- Pain Creek
- Paint River
- Pait Creek

== See also ==
- List of rivers of Ohio
