= Buford, Ohio =

- Census-designated place
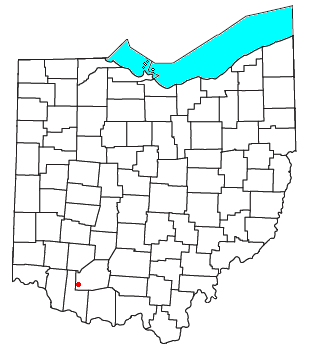
- Location of Buford, Ohio
- Coordinates: 39°04′19″N 83°50′21″W
- Country: United States
- State: Ohio
- County: Highland
- Township: Clay

Area
  - Total: 1.48 sq mi (3.84 km^{2})
  - Land: 1.48 sq mi (3.84 km^{2})
  - Water: 0 sq mi (0.00 km^{2})
- Elevation: 965 ft (294 m)

Population (2020)
  - Total: 306
  - Density: 206.3/sq mi (79.66/km^{2})
- Time zone: UTC-5 (Eastern (EST))
  - Summer (DST): UTC-4 (EDT)
- ZIP code: 45171
- Area codes: 937, 326
- FIPS code: 39-10156
- GNIS feature ID: 2628870

Buford is an unincorporated community and census-designated place in central Clay Township, Highland County, Ohio, United States. The population was 306 at the 2020 census. It once had a post office, with the ZIP code 45110. The current ZIP code 45171 is for nearby Sardinia.

== History ==
Buford was platted in 1834, and named after the maiden name of the wife of a first settler.

== Geography ==
Buford lies in southwestern Highland County at the intersection of State Routes 134, 138, and 321. Route 134 leads north 12 miles (19 km) to Lynchburg and south 5 miles (8 km) to Sardinia. Route 138 leads northeast 15 miles (24 km) to Hillsboro, the Highland county seat, while Route 321 leads southeast 6 miles (10 km) to Mowrystown.

According to the United States Census Bureau, the Buford CDP has a total area of 1.48 square miles (3.84 km^{2}), all of it recorded as land.

== Demographics ==
Historical population
Census	Pop.	Note	%±
2020	306		—
U.S. Decennial Census

== Notable people ==
- Edmund Wittenmyer, U.S. Army major general

== Gallery ==
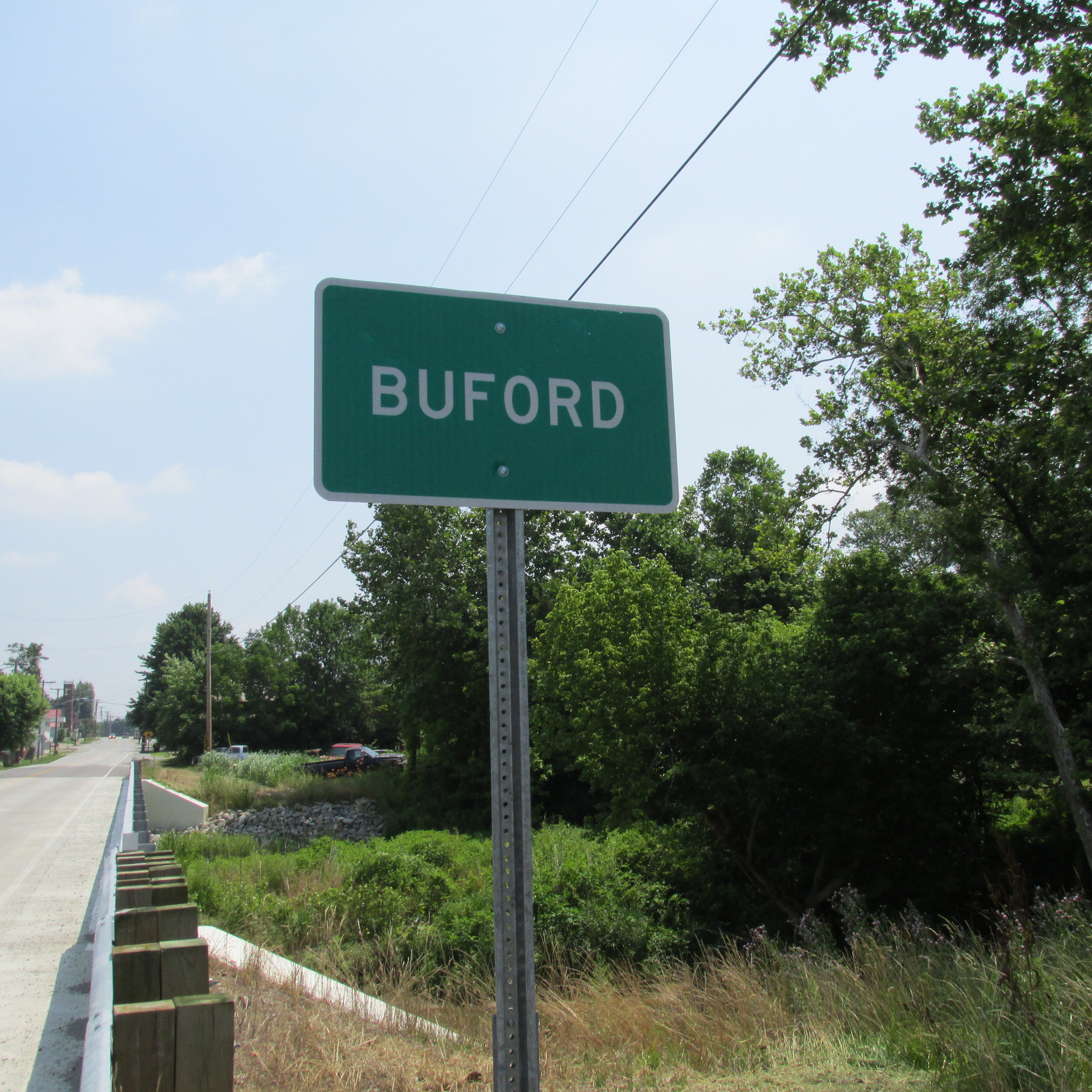
Buford community sign

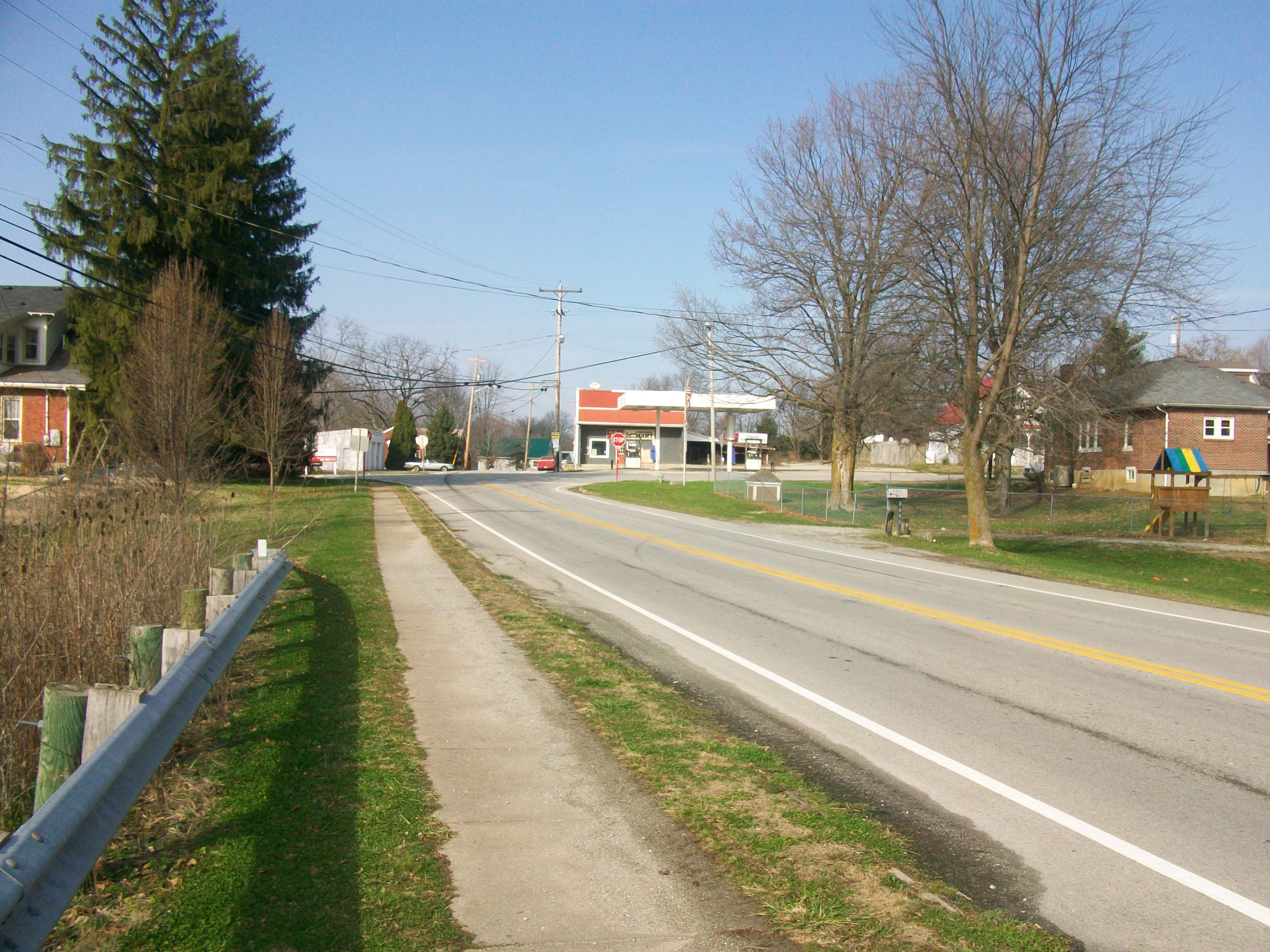
Intersection of State Routes 134 and 138

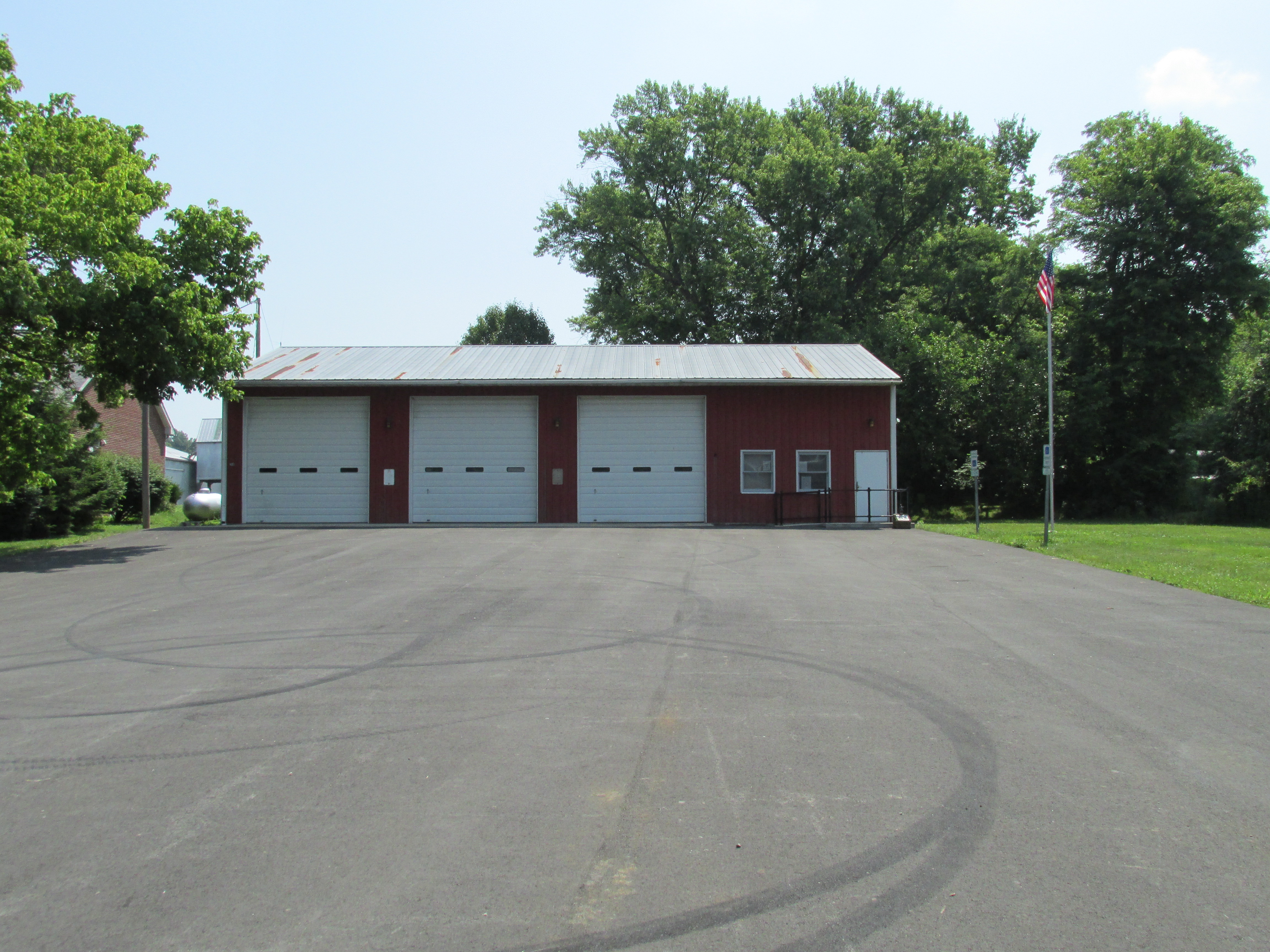
Clay Township Meeting Hall and Fire Station #66

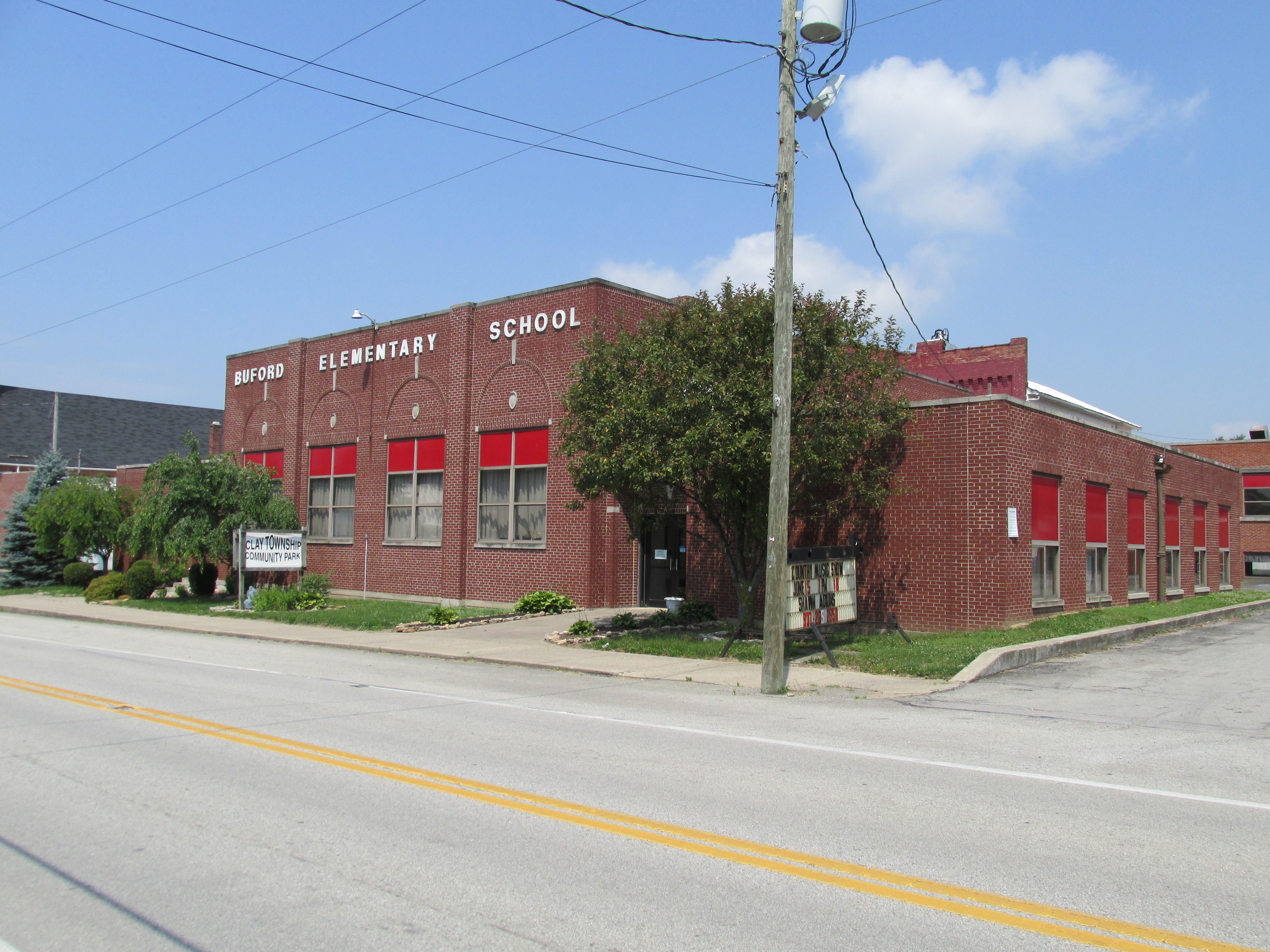
Clay Township Community Park (formerly Buford Elementary and High School)

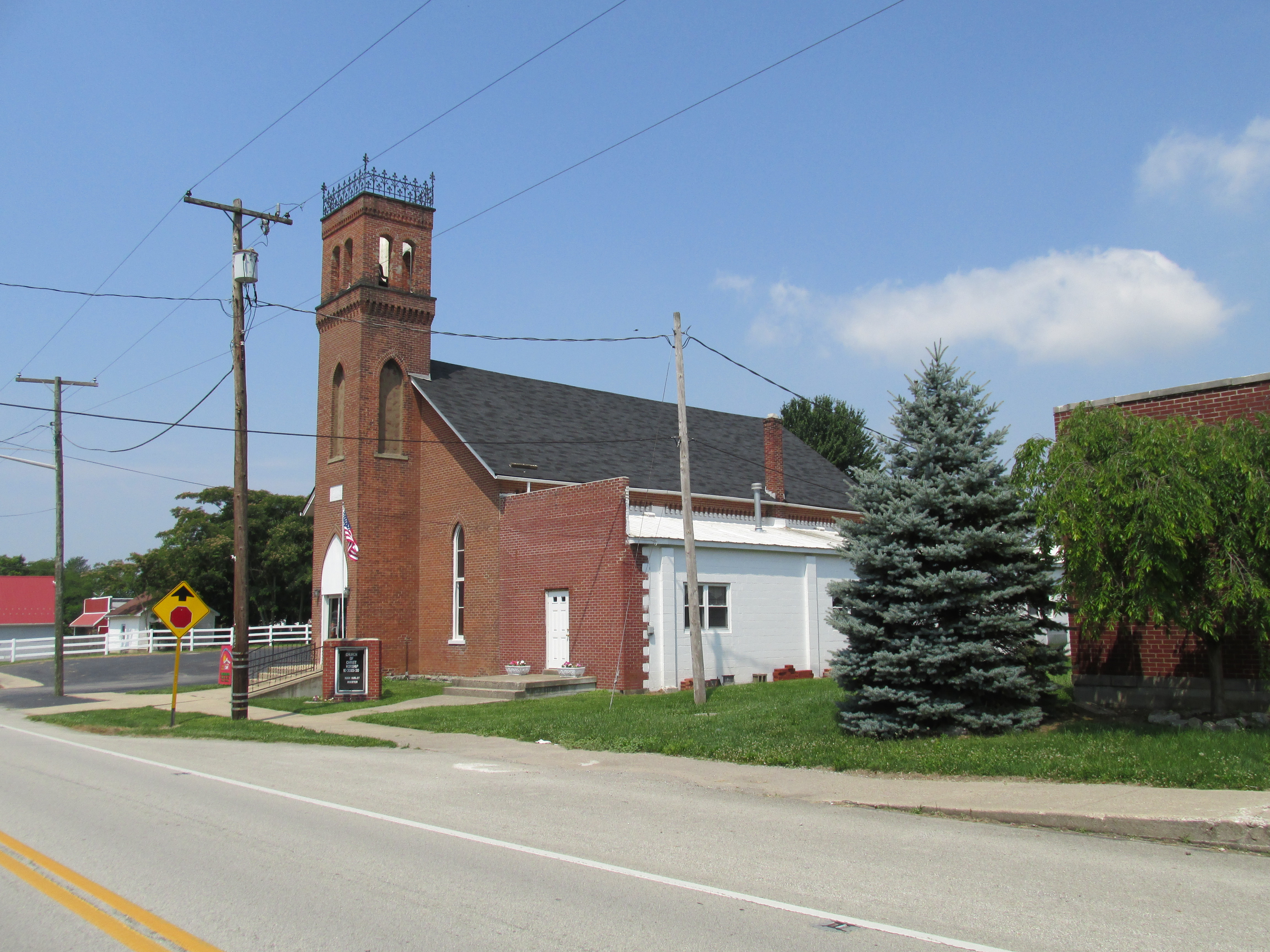
Buford Church of Christ

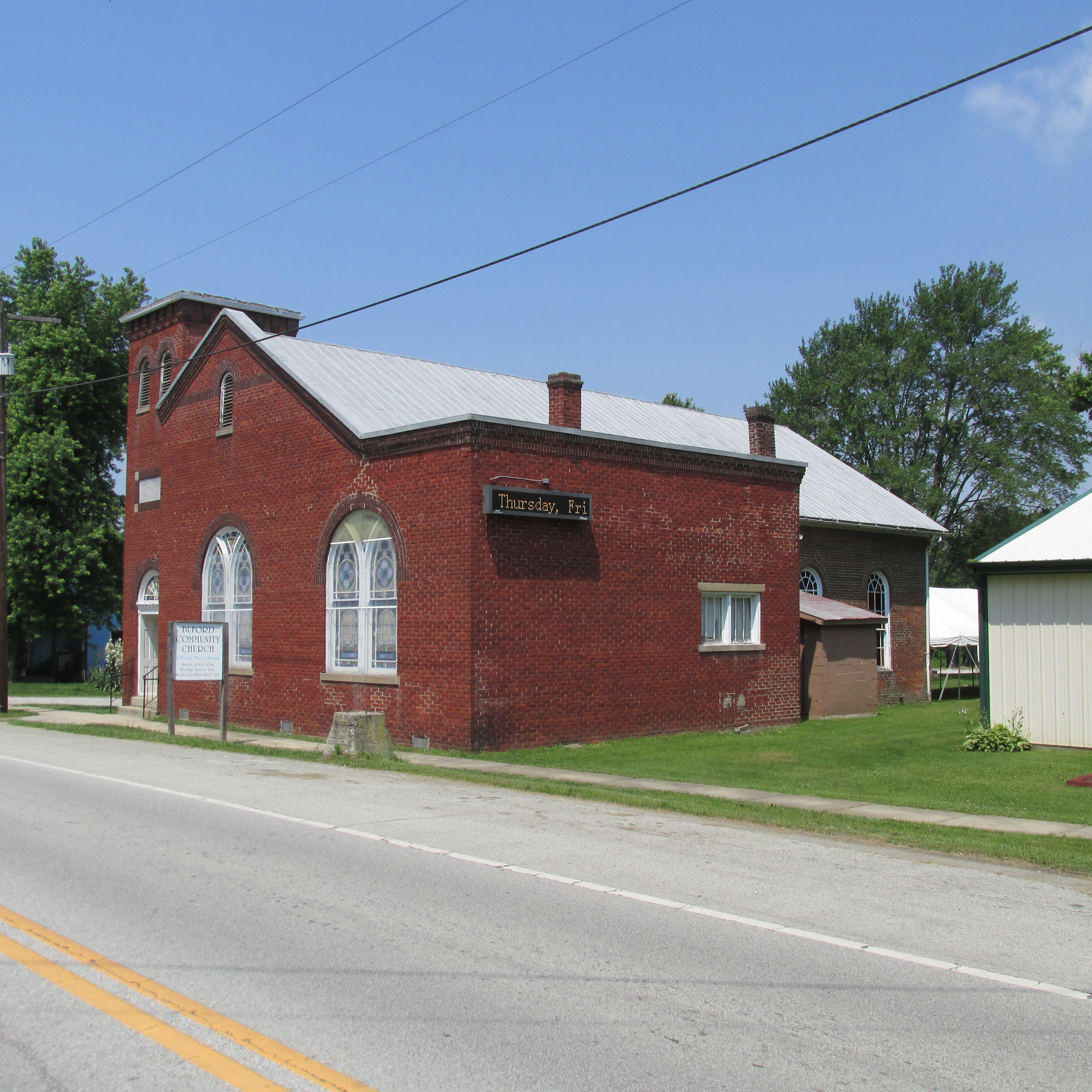
Buford Community Church

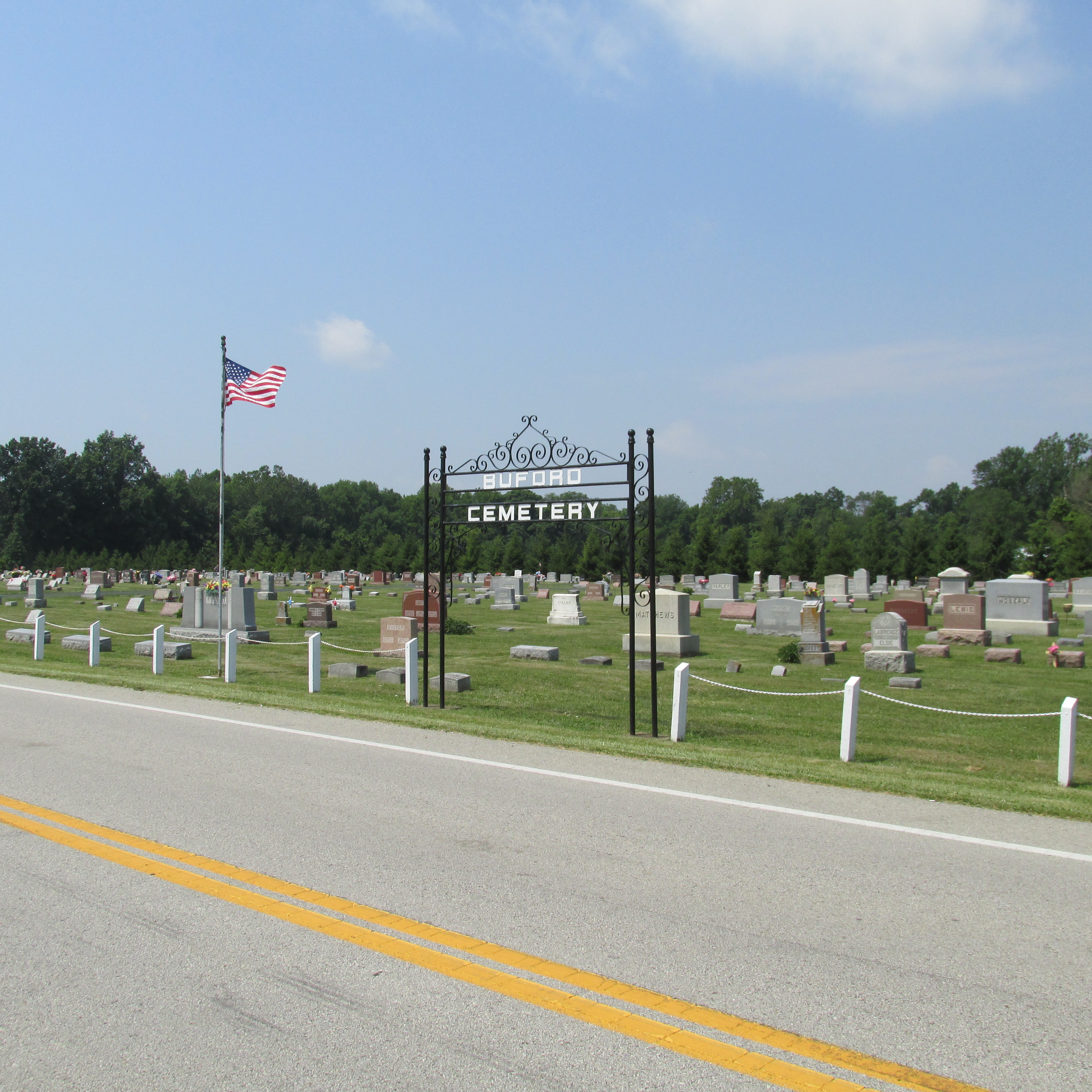
Buford Cemetery

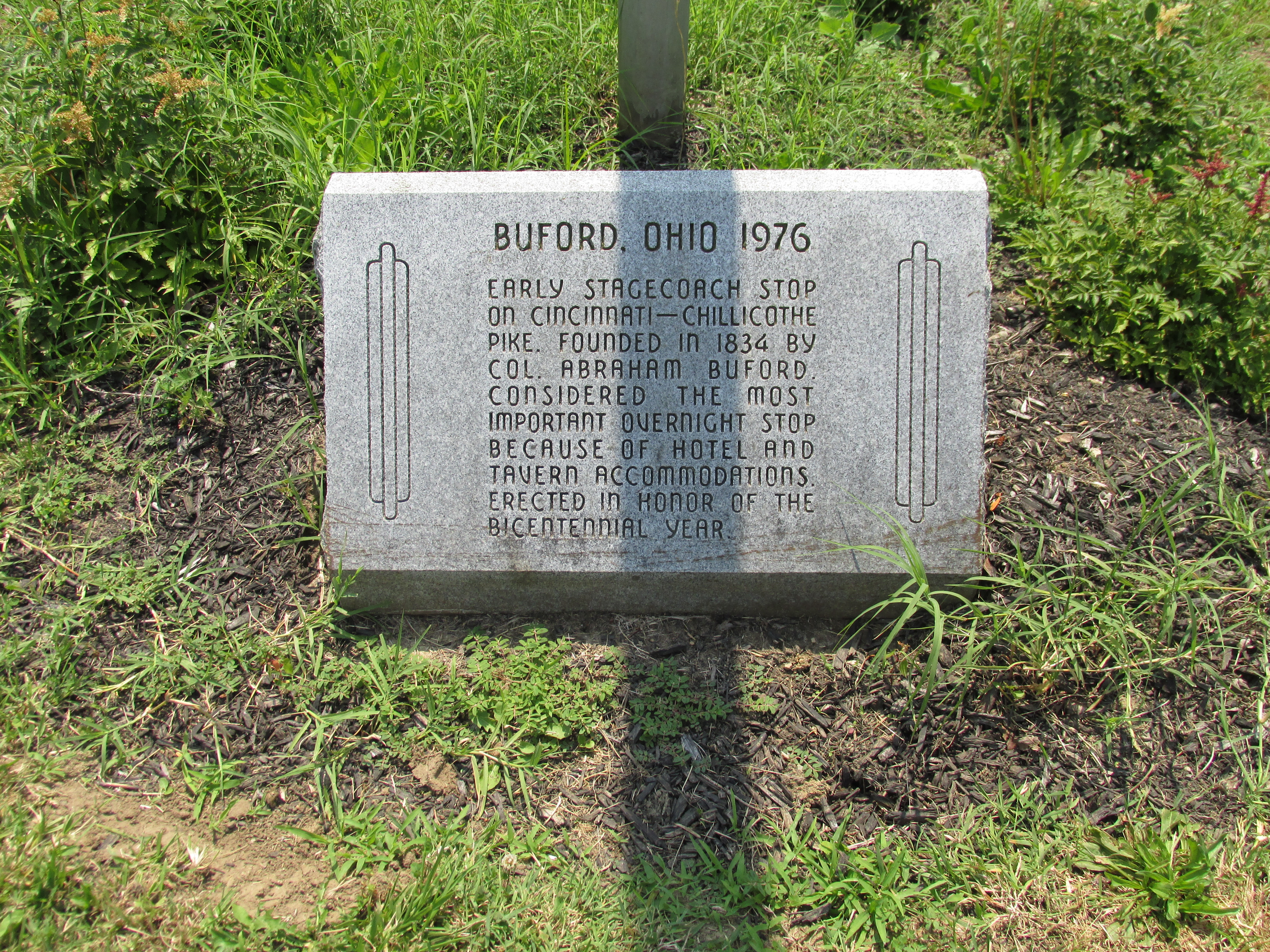
Bicentennial Corner Marker
