= Pennsylvania Route 102 =

State highway in Crawford County, Pennsylvania, US

Pennsylvania Route 102
- Cussewago Road

Route information
- Maintained by PennDOT
- Length: 4.291 mi (6.906 km)
- Existed: 1941–present

Major junctions
- South end: US 6 / US 19 / US 322 in Vernon Township
- North end: PA 98 in Vernon Township

Location
- Country: United States
- State: Pennsylvania
- Counties: Crawford

Highway system
- Pennsylvania State Route System; Interstate; US; State; Scenic; Legislative
← PA 101	→ PA 103

Pennsylvania Route 102 (PA 102), also known as Cussewago Road, is a 4.3-mile-long (6.9 km), north–south state highway located in Crawford County in Pennsylvania. The southern terminus is at U.S. Route 6 (US 6)/US 19/US 322 in Vernon Township. The northern terminus is at PA 98 in Vernon Township.

== Route description ==
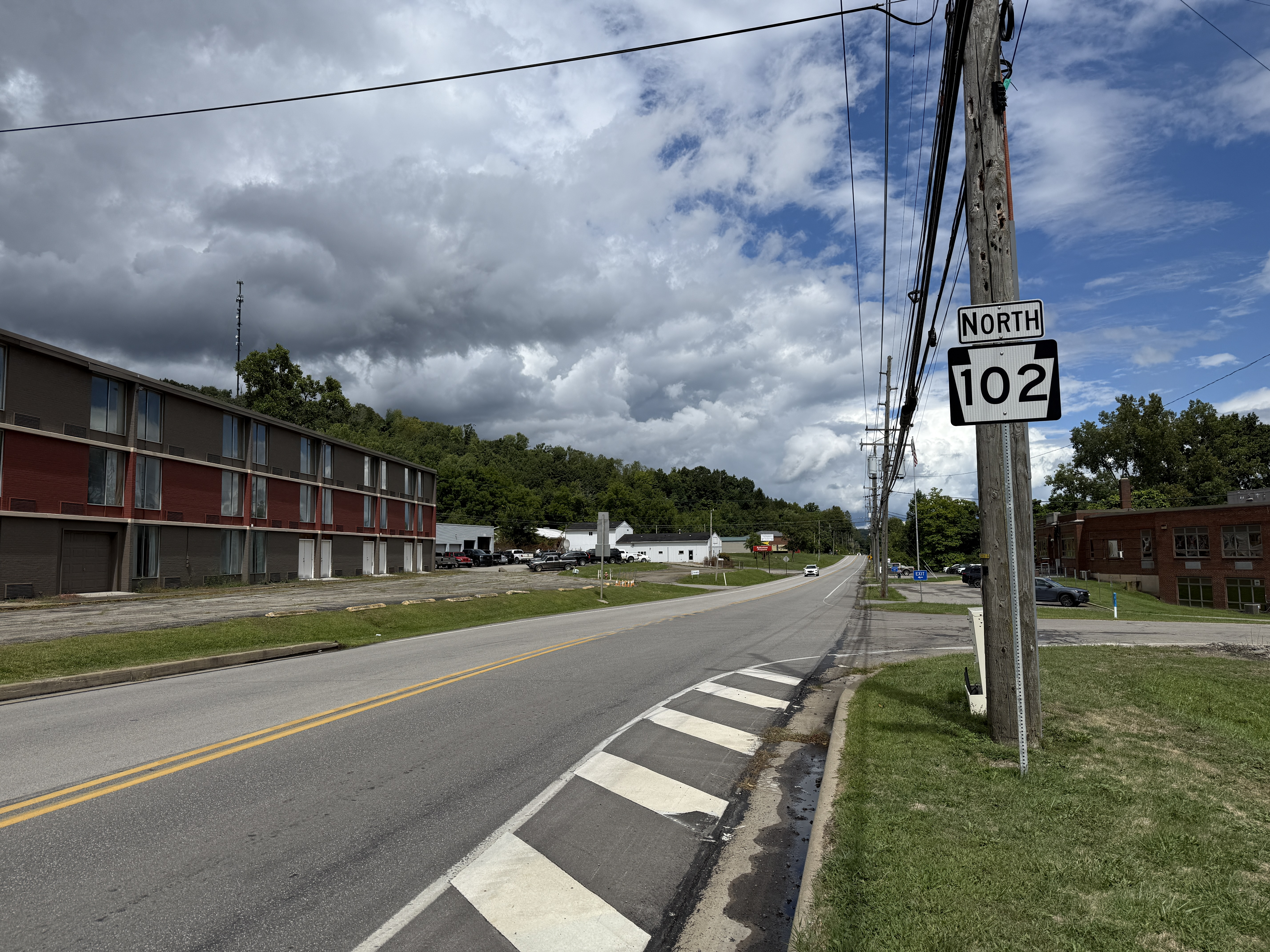
PA 102 northbound past US 6/US 19/US 322 in Vernon Township

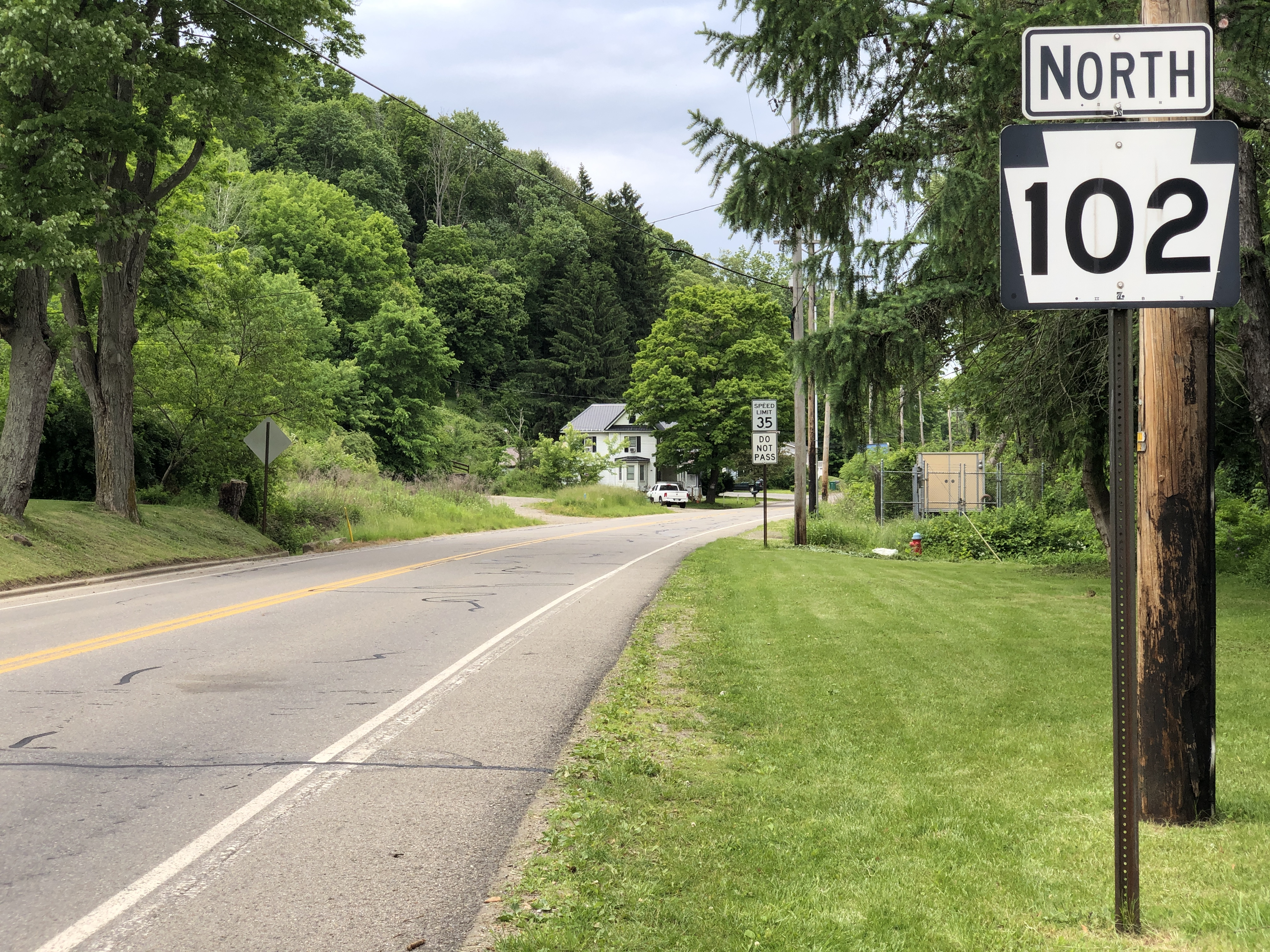
PA 102 northbound in Vernon Township

PA 102 begins at an intersection of US 6/US 19/US 322 southwest of the city of Meadville in Vernon Township. The route heads north-northeast as two-lane undivided Mercer Pike, running along the west side of Meadville through commercial areas. The road soon becomes Pennsylvania Avenue and passes woods to the west and homes to the east in the community of Kerrtown. PA 102 curves north and becomes Cussewago Road as it runs along the west bank of the French Creek through forested areas. As the road begins to turn northwest, it passes near some industrial areas before turning west in the residential village of Fredericksburg. The route continues through wooded areas of homes as it passes under I-79 just before its terminus at PA 98 in the village of Onspaugh Corners.

== History ==
PA 102 was originally signed in Northampton County that went from the town of Stockertown to Easton. The route then in 1941 was moved to its current area in Crawford County, though for the next 10–20 years, its exact location was moved around the area west of Meadville.

== Major intersections ==
The entire route is in Vernon Township, Crawford County.

mi	km	Destinations	Notes
0.00	0.00	US 6 / US 19 / US 322 (Conneaut Lake Road) to I-79	Southern terminus; to I-79 via US 6/322 west/US 19 south
4.291	6.906	PA 98 (Perry Highway)	Northern terminus
1.000 mi = 1.609 km; 1.000 km = 0.621 mi
