= Kip Young =

American baseball player (born 1954)

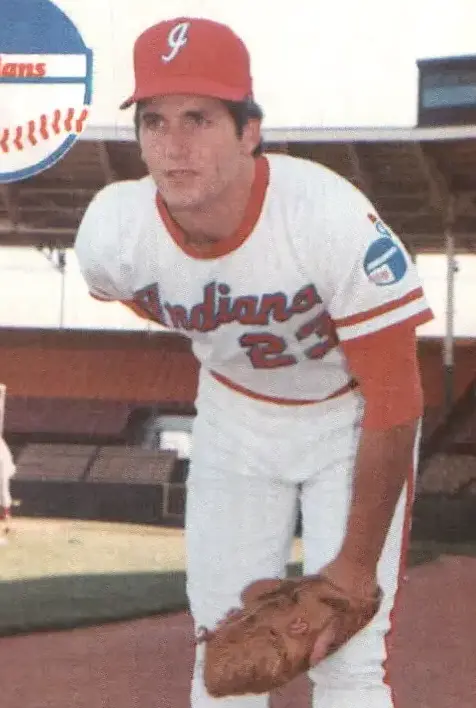
- Young with the Indianapolis Indians c. 1982
- Pitcher
- Born: October 29, 1954 (age 71); Georgetown, Ohio, U.S.
- Batted: Right Threw: Right

MLB debut
- July 21, 1978, for the Detroit Tigers

Last MLB appearance
- September 26, 1979, for the Detroit Tigers

MLB statistics
- Win–loss record: 8–9
- Earned run average: 3.86
- Strikeouts: 71
- Stats at Baseball Reference

Teams
- Detroit Tigers (1978–1979)

Kip Lane Young (born October 29, 1954) is an American former baseball player. A right-handed pitcher, Young played Major League Baseball with the Detroit Tigers in 1978 and 1979. As a rookie in 1978, he pitched complete-game victories in his first four starts and compiled a 2.81 earned run average (ERA) for the season.

Before his professional career began, Young played college baseball at Bowling Green State University where he won 37 games to set a Mid-American Conference record.

== Early years ==
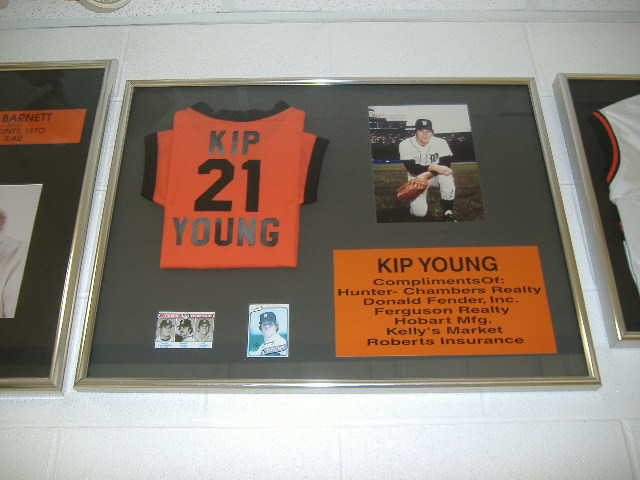
Young's retired number and jersey at Whiteoak High School

Young was born in Georgetown, Ohio, in 1954. He attended Whiteoak High School in Mowrystown, Ohio, graduating in 1972. He then enrolled at Bowling Green State University and was named to the All-Mid-American Conference baseball team for three consecutive years. He twice won 11 games in a season, and his 37 career wins established a MAC record. He compiled a 1.02 ERA in 1974. His 232 strikeouts and 295 innings pitched are also Bowling Green records. He was inducted to the Bowling Green Athletic Hall of Fame in 1976.

== Professional baseball ==
=== 1976 and 1977 seasons ===
Young was drafted by the Tigers in the 23rd round of the 1976 Major League Baseball June Amateur Draft. He spent the 1976 season with the Lakeland Tigers where he compiled a 4–2 record and 2.78 earned run average (ERA). He began the 1977 with the Double-A Montgomery Rebels where he compiled a 5–2 record and 3.20 ERA. He was promoted to the Triple-A Evansville Triplets in the middle of the 1977 season and went 4-4 with a 4.03 ERA.

=== 1978 season ===
Young began the 1978 season in Evansville. By July, he had an 11–3 record in 20 starts with 3.02 ERA.

Young's strong showing at Evansville led to a call from the Tigers, and he made his major league debut in July 1978. In his first four starts, he pitched four complete games: a 4-1 victory over the Oakland As on July 24 in which he retired the last 12 batters he faced; a four-hit, 9-1 victory over the Seattle Mariners on July 29; a 7-1 victory over the Chicago White Sox on August 4; and a 4-2 victory over the Texas Rangers on August 9.

After the fourth victory, the crowd of 30,515 demanded a curtain call from Young who obliged and noted, "I can't 100 per cent believe what's happening." Young was billed as the Tigers' third rookie pitching prodigy in three years, following Mark Fidrych in 1976 and Dave Rozema in 1977. Interviewed in mid-August, he noted: "Staying consistent, that's the thing. . . . I don't want to be remembered as a guy who pitched three or four good games, then didn't pitch well the rest of the year."

In his fifth start, Young gave up three runs in seven innings and lost to the Royals. His strong pitching continued with eight consecutive quality starts, at that time tied for the second longest streak in Tigers' history—trailing only Tommy Bridges' nine-game streak in 1942. Young finished the 1978 season with a 6–7 record and a 2.81 ERA in 14 games.

=== 1979 season ===
Young started the 1979 season pitching well during spring training. He had a string of 12 scoreless innings in March and was the team's "most impressive starter." After a strong showing in spring training, Young began the season as part of the Tigers' four-man starting rotation along with Dave Rozema, Jack Billingham, and Milt Wilcox. In four starts, however, Young struggled to a 9.60 ERA. On May 9, the Tigers sent him back to Evansville to make room for yet another promising rookie Jack Morris. At the time, Young took responsibility for pitching himself out of a job, noting, "My changeup is not there like it was last year. I never threw so many high changeups in my life. . . . I'm just thoroughly disgusted with what's been happening."

In his first start after being sent to Evansville, Young pitched a one-hitter. In mid-June, Tiger starter Dave Rozema was put on the disabled list, and Young was recalled to the Tigers having won three of six decisions with a 3.60 ERA. However, with Sparky Anderson now the Tigers' new manager, Young never figured prominently in the club's plans. He was demoted again to Evansville on July 25 and before being recalled for a final stint in the majors in September.

Young pitched in his final major league game on September 26, 1979. He finished the season with a 2–2 record and a 6.39 in 43-2/3 inning pitched. On November 21, 1979, the Tigers sold Young to the Spokane Indians, the Triple-A farm club of the Seattle Mariners.

=== 1980 to 1982 seasons ===
Young did not make the Mariners' major league roster, and appeared in only four games for Spokane, compiling a 7.07 ERA in 14 innings pitched. He was acquired by the Triple-A Indianapolis Indians in late May 1980. He remained with Indianapolis through the 1981 season and at the start of the 1981 season. He started 26 games for Indianapolis in 1981, compiling a 10–12 record and 4.04 ERA.

At the start of the 1982 season, Young, at age 27, acknowledged he had been close to giving up on his pitching career, but was still not ready to quit: "First of all, I still love the game of baseball and if I didn't think I could still pitch I wouldn't be in the game. Second of all, I still think I can pitch in the big leagues if given a chance."

Young finished the 1982 season, and his professional baseball career, with the Toledo Mud Hens in the Minnesota Twins farm system. He started 15 games for Toledo and compiled a 6–5 record and 4.61 ERA. In the spring of 1983, Toledo did not offer Young a contract. He noted at the time: "It's amazing. Not too long ago, I was supposed to be one of the top young pitchers in Detroit, then the next year I'm nobody. But that's baseball, worth a million one day and a dime the next."

== Later years ==
After his retirement from baseball, Young became a physical education teacher for the Eastern-Local School District in Brown County, Ohio. Young has since retired from this position, as well.
