= Whiteoak High School =

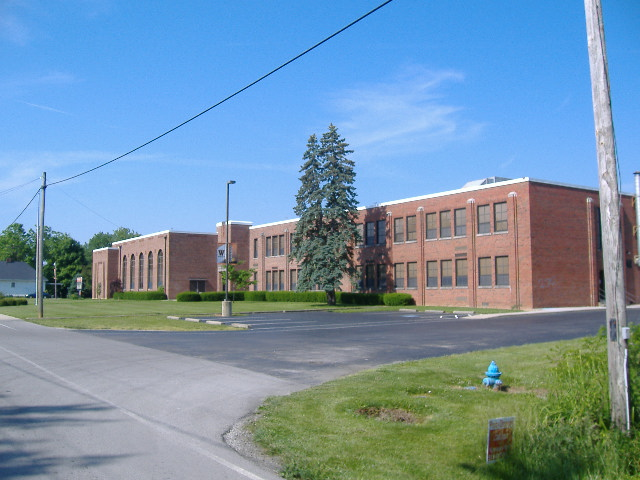

Location
- 44 North High Street; Mowrystown; Mowrystown, Highland County, Ohio 45155; United States
- Coordinates: 39°02′31.38″N 83°44′53.85″W

Information
- Type: Public, Coeducational High School
- Opened: 1938-39 (Present High School - expanded in 1986 and 2000.)
- School district: Bright Local Schools
- Superintendent: Jason Iles
- Principal: Mr. Gauche
- Grades: 7-12
- Enrollment: 166 (2023-2024)
- Average class size: 43
- Colors: Orange and Black
- Song: On, Wisconsin!
- Athletics conference: Southern Hills Athletic Conference
- Sports: Cross Country, Golf, Volleyball, Basketball, Bowling, Cheerleading, Track & Field, Baseball and Softball
- Mascot: Wildcat
- Team name: Wildcats
- Newspaper: Weekly Wildcat
- Yearbook: Prowler
- Website: www.blsd.us

Whiteoak High School is a public high school in Mowrystown, Ohio, USA, and the only high school in the Bright Local Schools district. The student-teacher ratio is 15:1. The school mascot is the Wildcat. The high school and junior high are in the same building.

== Athletics ==
Whiteoak competes in the Southern Hills Athletic Conference and is a member of the Ohio High School Athletic Association. Whiteoak offers a variety of sports, such as cross country, golf, volleyball, basketball, bowling, cheerleading, baseball, softball, and track & field.

- 2018 Baseball team reached Final Four, 1st in state coaches poll, won gold ball
- 2013 Baseball team reached Sweet 16 ranked, 9th in state, won gold ball
- 2002 Boys Basketball team reached final four

== Notable alumni ==
- Kip Young, Former MLB player Detroit Tigers, Class of 1972
