= Fredericksburg, Crawford County, Pennsylvania =

Unincorporated community in Pennsylvania, US

- Census-designated place
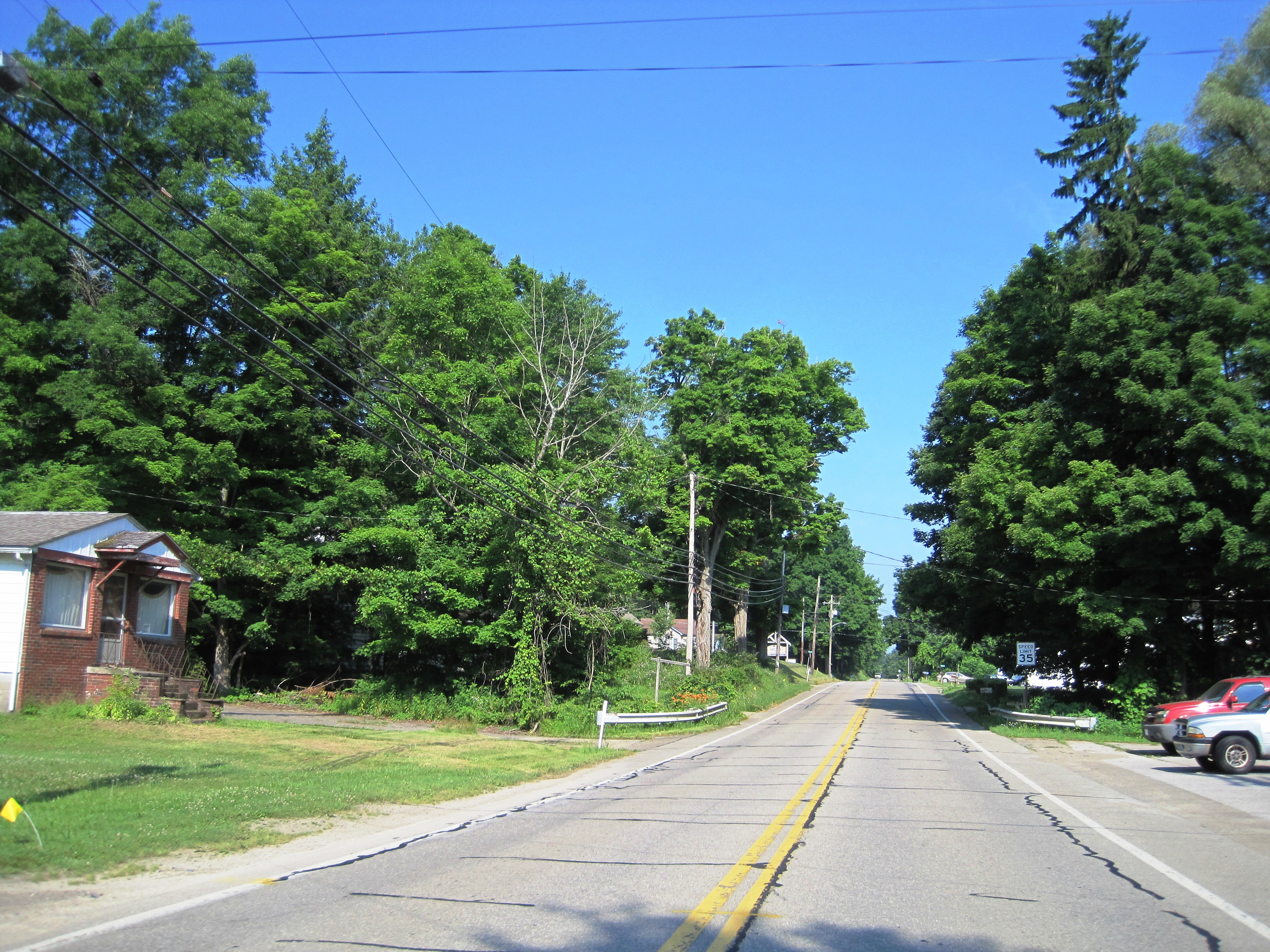
- Along PA 102 northbound

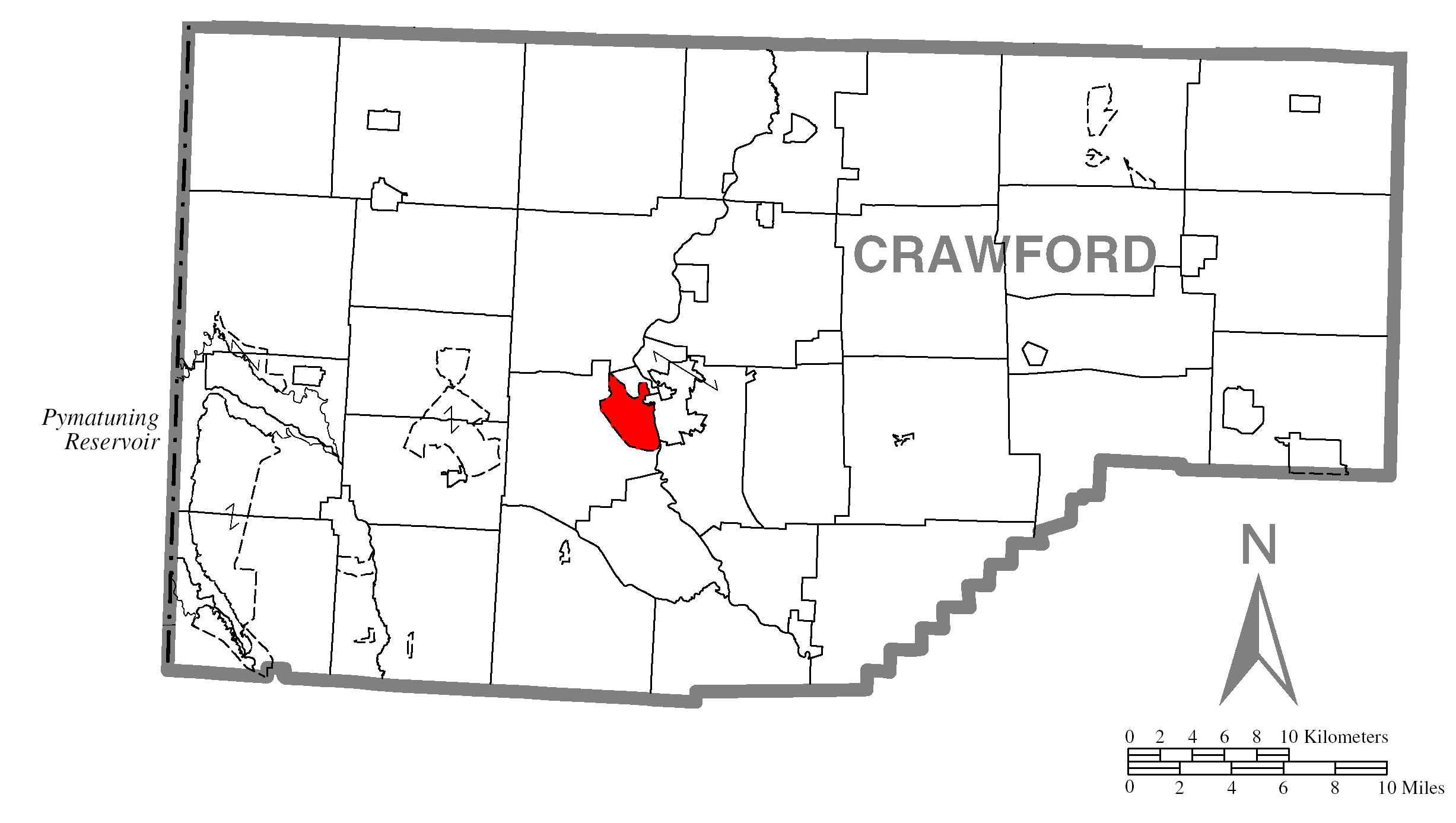
- Location of Fredericksburg in Crawford County

- Location of Crawford County in Pennsylvania
- Coordinates: 41°38′34″N 80°10′12″W
- Country: United States
- State: Pennsylvania
- County: Crawford County
- Township: Vernon

Area
  - Total: 1.7 sq mi (4.5 km^{2})
  - Land: 1.7 sq mi (4.5 km^{2})
  - Water: 0 sq mi (0.0 km^{2})
- Elevation: 1,130 ft (340 m)

Population (2010)
  - Total: 733
  - Density: 419/sq mi (161.6/km^{2})
- Time zone: UTC-4 (EST)
  - Summer (DST): UTC-5 (EDT)
- Area code: 814

Fredericksburg is a census-designated place (CDP) in Crawford County, Pennsylvania, United States. The population was 733 at the 2010 census, down from 1,140 in 2000, when the CDP included the area that is now listed as Kerrtown.

== Geography ==
Fredericksburg is located near the center of Crawford County at 41°38′34″N 80°10′12″W, in northeastern Vernon Township. It is bordered to the east by the city of Meadville, the county seat, and to the south by the Kerrtown CDP. French Creek, a tributary of the Allegheny River, forms part of the boundary with Meadville. Cussewago Creek, a tributary of French Creek, flows from west to east through the CDP, north of the center of town, which extends along Pennsylvania Route 102 (Cussewago Road).

According to the United States Census Bureau, the Fredericksburg CDP has a total area of 1.7 square miles (4.5 km^{2}), all land.

== Demographics ==
As of the census of 2000, there were 1,140 people, 507 households, and 318 families residing in the CDP. The population density was 292.3 inhabitants per square mile (112.9/km^{2}). There were 553 housing units at an average density of 141.8 per square mile (54.7/km^{2}). The racial makeup of the CDP was 96.58% White, 2.02% African American, 0.09% Native American, 0.35% Asian, 0.09% Pacific Islander, and 0.88% from two or more races. Hispanic or Latino of any race were 0.26% of the population.

There were 507 households, out of which 26.8% had children under the age of 18 living with them, 47.1% were married couples living together, 10.1% had a female householder with no husband present, and 37.1% were non-families. 32.3% of all households were made up of individuals, and 13.4% had someone living alone who was 65 years of age or older. The average household size was 2.25 and the average family size was 2.82.

In the CDP, the population was spread out, with 20.4% under the age of 18, 7.9% from 18 to 24, 28.9% from 25 to 44, 25.0% from 45 to 64, and 17.8% who were 65 years of age or older. The median age was 40 years. For every 100 females, there were 92.2 males. For every 100 females age 18 and over, there were 89.2 males.

The median income for a household in the CDP was $30,313, and the median income for a family was $41,250. Males had a median income of $30,769 versus $21,900 for females. The per capita income for the CDP was $18,021. About 10.1% of families and 14.4% of the population were below the poverty line, including 21.9% of those under age 18 and 15.8% of those age 65 or over.
