= Vernon Township, Pennsylvania =

Township in Pennsylvania, US

Coordinates: 41°36′00″N 80°15′59″W

Vernon Township, Crawford County, Pennsylvania
- Township
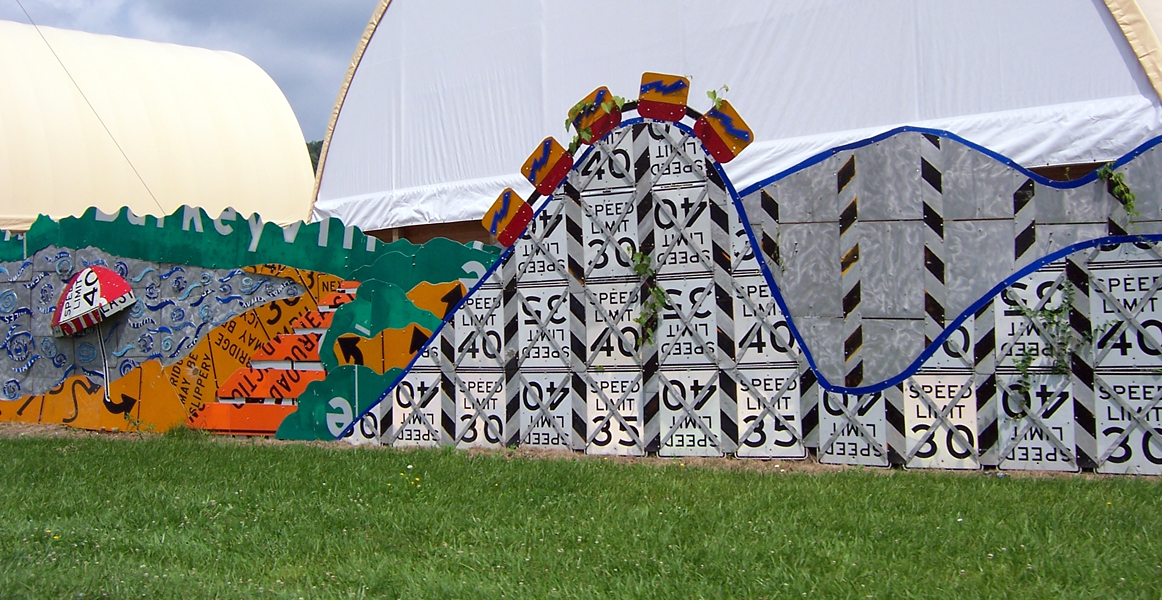
- PennDOT facility
- Nickname: The Golden Link
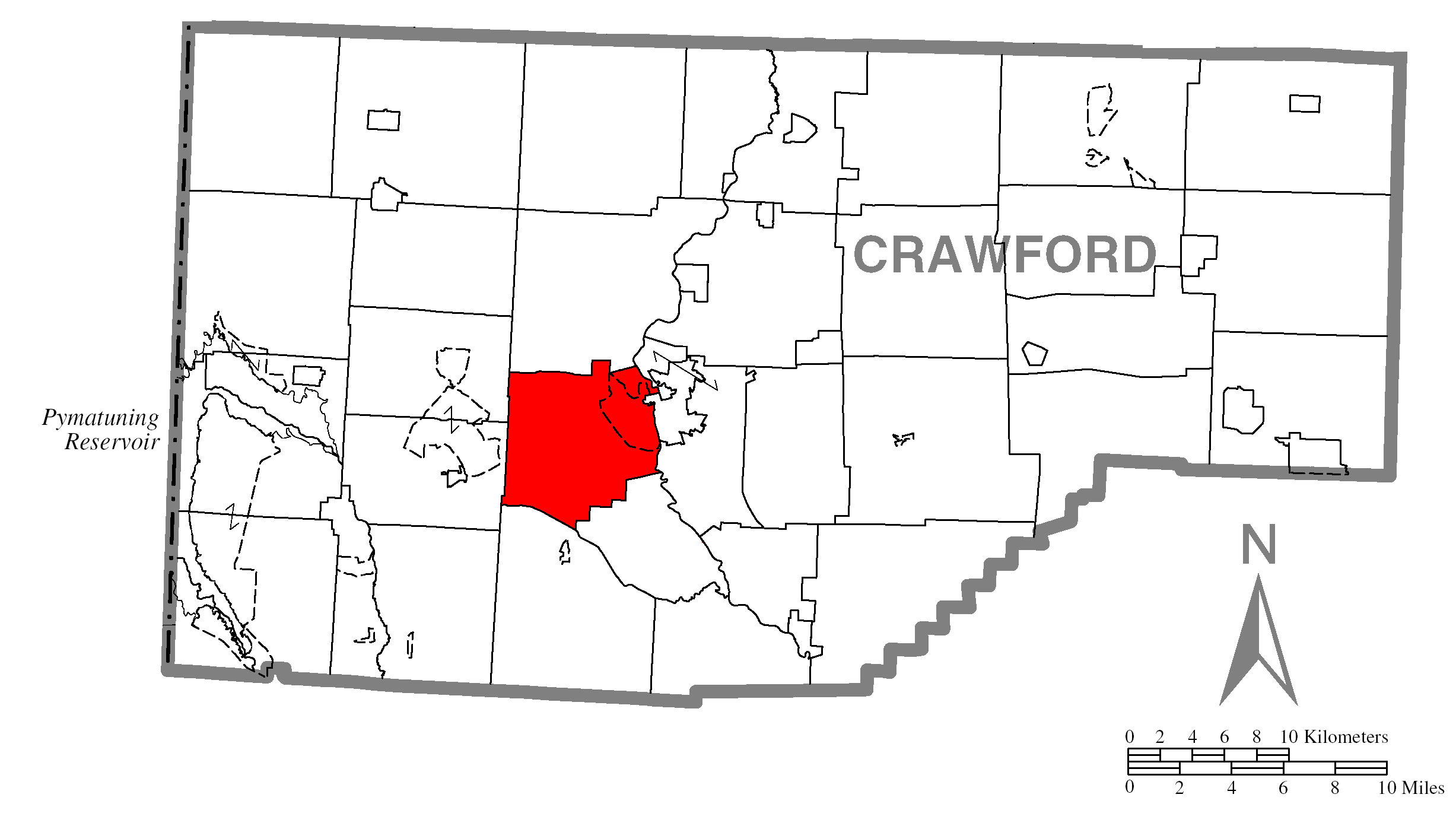
- Location of Vernon Township in Crawford County

- Location of Crawford County in Pennsylvania
- Country: United States
- State: Pennsylvania
- County: Crawford

Area
  - Total: 29.57 sq mi (76.58 km^{2})
  - Land: 29.56 sq mi (76.56 km^{2})
  - Water: 0.0077 sq mi (0.02 km^{2})
- Highest elevation (Top of Round Top): 1,512 ft (461 m)
- Lowest elevation (French Creek): 1,060 ft (320 m)

Population (2020)
  - Total: 5,310 ▼
  - Estimate (2024): 5,243
  - Density: 184.8/sq mi (71.37/km^{2})
- Time zone: UTC-4 (EST)
  - Summer (DST): UTC-5 (EDT)
- Area code: 814
- FIPS code: 42-039-80000
- Website: www.vernontwp-pa.gov

Vernon Township is a township in Crawford County, Pennsylvania, United States. The population was 5,310 at the 2020 census, down from 5,630 at the 2010 census.

According to the township's website, Vernon Township is nicknamed the "Golden Link" due to its location between the county seat (Meadville) and the largest natural lake in the state (Conneaut Lake), as well as being the self-described business center of Crawford County.

== Geography ==
The township is southwest of the geographic center of Crawford County and is bordered to the east by Meadville, the county seat. French Creek, a southward-flowing tributary of the Allegheny River, forms most of the boundary with Meadville, as well as the eastern boundary of the township north and south of Meadville. The township includes the unincorporated communities of Fredericksburg and Kerrtown, both in the east along the Meadville border.

Interstate 79 crosses the township, with access from Exit 147 (U.S. Route 6 and 322). From this exit it is 40 miles (64 km) north to Erie and 88 miles (142 km) south to Pittsburgh. US 6 and 322 lead northeast into Meadville and west 7 miles (11 km) to Conneaut Lake.

According to the United States Census Bureau, the township has a total area of 29.6 square miles (76.6 km^{2}), of which 0.01 square miles (0.02 km^{2}), or 0.03%, is water.

== Demographics ==
Historical population
Census	Pop.	Note	%±
2000	5,499		—
2010	5,630		2.4%
2020	5,310		−5.7%
2024 (est.)	5,243		−1.3%
U.S. Decennial Census

As of the census of 2000, there were 5,499 people, 2,395 households, and 1,599 families residing in the township. The population density was 186.1 inhabitants per square mile (71.9/km^{2}). There were 2,599 housing units at an average density of 87.9 per square mile (33.9/km^{2}). The racial makeup of the township was 97.45% White, 1.00% African American, 0.29% Native American, 0.45% Asian, 0.02% Pacific Islander, 0.18% from other races, and 0.60% from two or more races. Hispanic or Latino of any race were 0.56% of the population.

There were 2,395 households, out of which 25.8% had children under the age of 18 living with them, 55.0% were married couples living together, 8.0% had a female householder with no husband present, and 33.2% were non-families. 28.7% of all households were made up of individuals, and 12.3% had someone living alone who was 65 years of age or older. The average household size was 2.30 and the average family size was 2.80.

In the township the population was spread out, with 20.8% under the age of 18, 6.1% from 18 to 24, 27.0% from 25 to 44, 28.0% from 45 to 64, and 18.1% who were 65 years of age or older. The median age was 42 years. For every 100 females, there were 92.5 males. For every 100 females age 18 and over, there were 89.1 males.

The median income for a household in the township was $38,264, and the median income for a family was $46,420. Males had a median income of $36,272 versus $22,095 for females. The per capita income for the township was $21,808. About 3.7% of families and 6.1% of the population were below the poverty line, including 7.9% of those under age 18 and 7.2% of those age 65 or over.

== Government ==
The township has an elected board of supervisors consisting of five elected supervisors and a professional management staff that handles the day-to-day operations of the township consisting of a township manager, currently Robert Horvat, and a secretary/treasurer Amie Steadman, along with other administrative staff. Township government agencies include a road department, planning board and zoning office, water authority, sanitation authority. Police services are contracted with the City of Meadville to handle all calls for law enforcement. As of October 2024, the residents of the township are represented in the state legislature by State Senator Michele Brooks and State Representative Brad Roae.
