= Kerrtown, Pennsylvania =

Unincorporated community in Pennsylvania, US

- Census-designated place
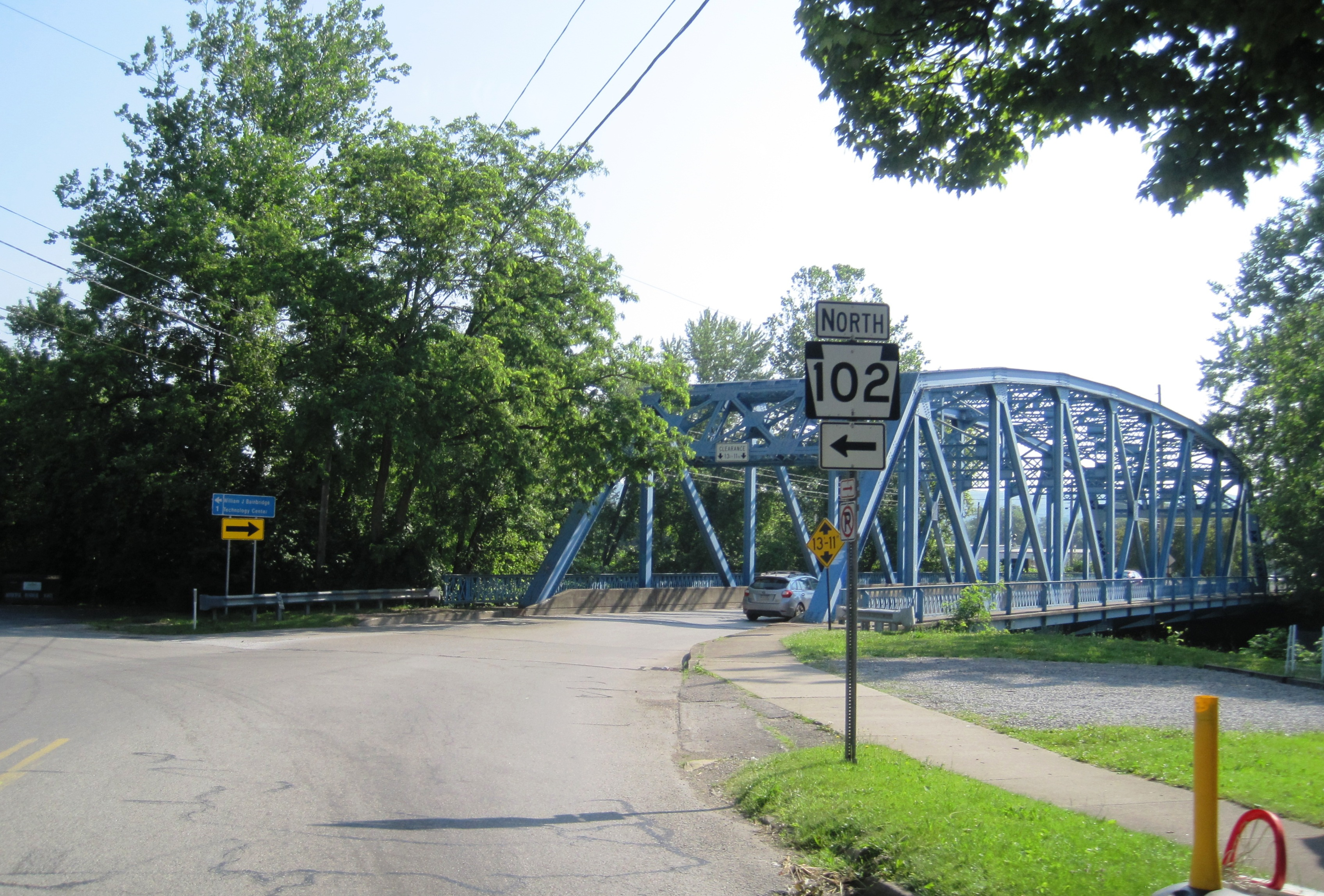
- PA 102 at Mercer Street in Kerrtown

- Location within Pennsylvania Location within the United States
- Coordinates: 41°37′45″N 80°9′47″W
- Country: United States
- State: Pennsylvania
- County: Crawford
- Township: Vernon

Area
  - Total: 0.85 sq mi (2.20 km^{2})
  - Land: 0.85 sq mi (2.20 km^{2})
  - Water: 0 sq mi (0.00 km^{2})
- Elevation: 1,100 ft (340 m)

Population (2020)
  - Total: 258
  - Density: 304.3/sq mi (117.49/km^{2})
- Time zone: UTC-5 (Eastern (EST))
  - Summer (DST): UTC-4 (EDT)
- ZIP code: 16335
- FIPS code: 42-39504
- GNIS feature ID: 2633702

Kerrtown is a census-designated place in Vernon Township, Crawford County, Pennsylvania, United States, at the intersection of U.S. Routes 6/19/322 and Pennsylvania Route 102, just west of the city of Meadville. At the 2010 census, the population was 305.

== Demographics ==
Historical population
Census	Pop.	Note	%±
2010	305		—
2020	258		−15.4%
U.S. Decennial Census
