= Lynchburg Covered Bridge =

- U.S. National Register of Historic Places
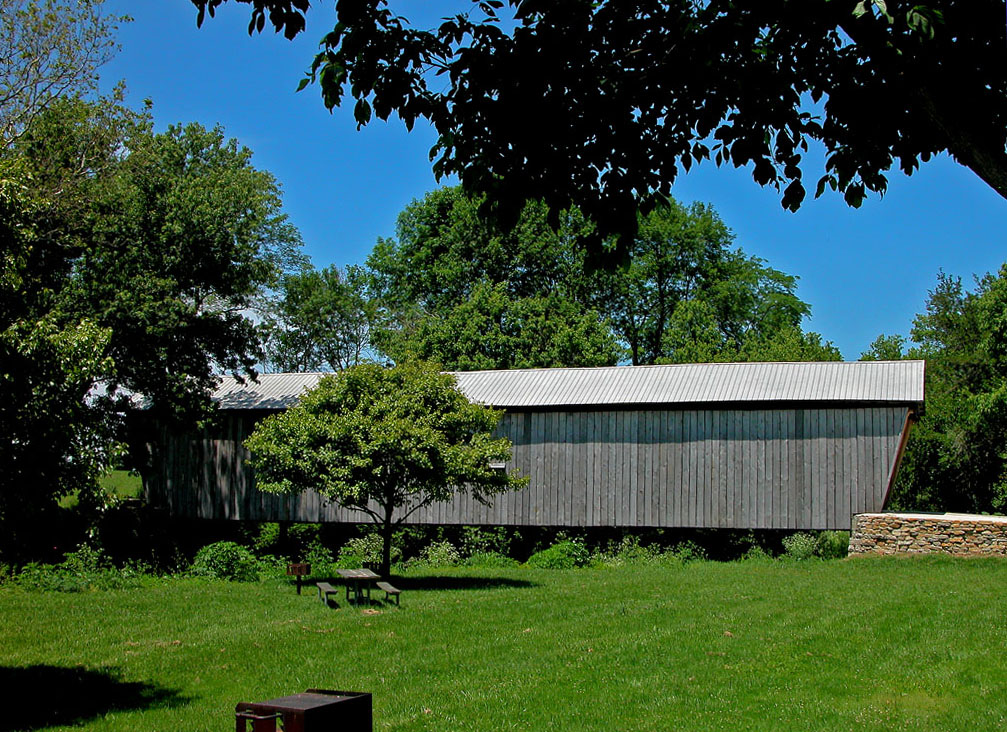
- Lynchburg Covered Bridge

- Location within Ohio Location within the United States
- Location: Lynchburg, Ohio
- Coordinates: 39°14′42″N 83°47′40″W
- Built: 1870
- Architect: John C. Gregg
- Architectural style: Long Truss
- NRHP reference No.: 76001456
- Added to NRHP: March 16, 1976

The Lynchburg Covered Bridge is a historic wooden covered bridge that spans the east fork of the Little Miami River in Lynchburg, Ohio. It also has the distinction, following a recent repair and restoration project, of being the only such covered bridge in North America to have been converted to a pseudo-suspension infrastructure. The bridge was built in 1870 as a Long truss.

== Gallery ==
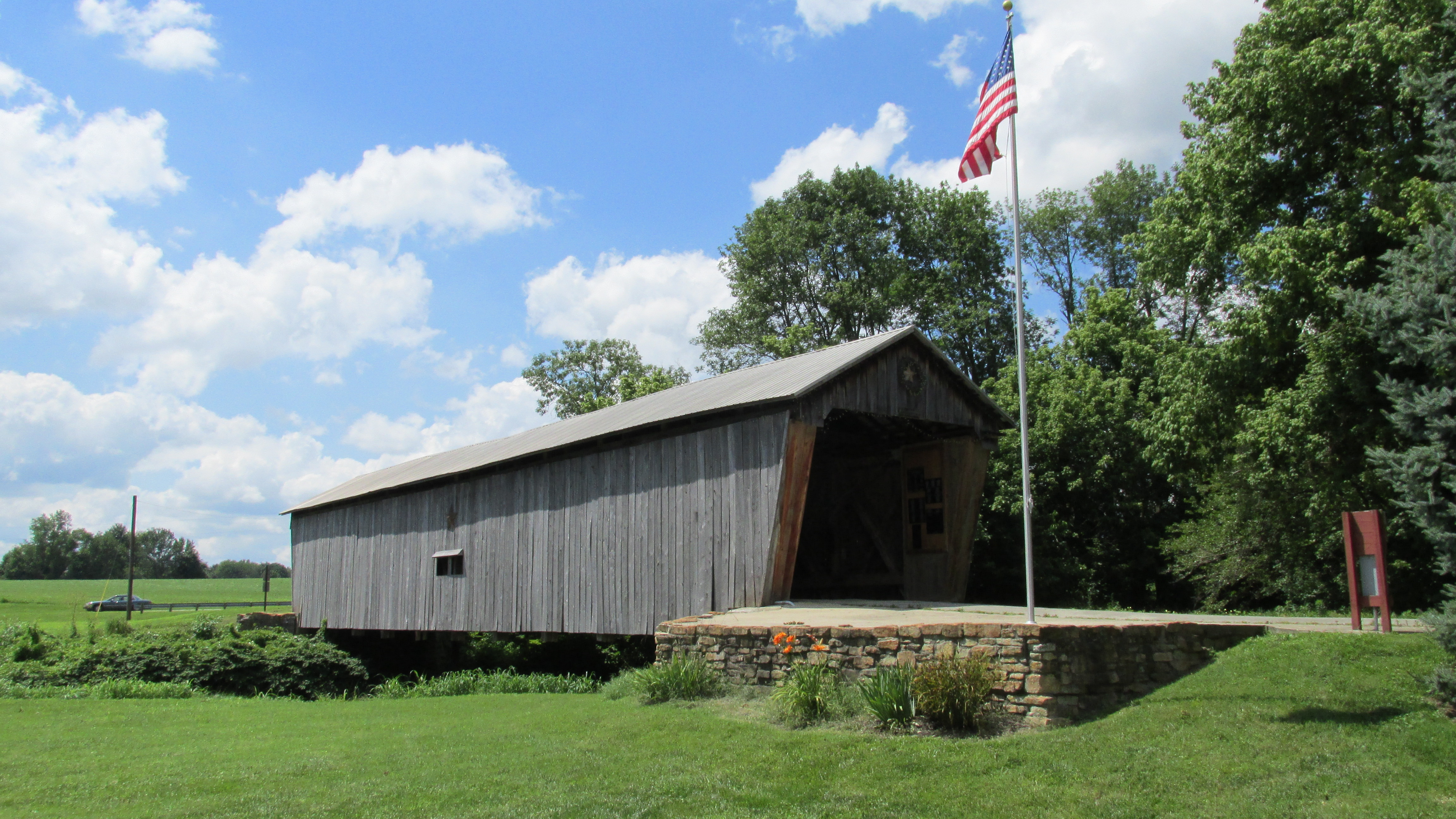

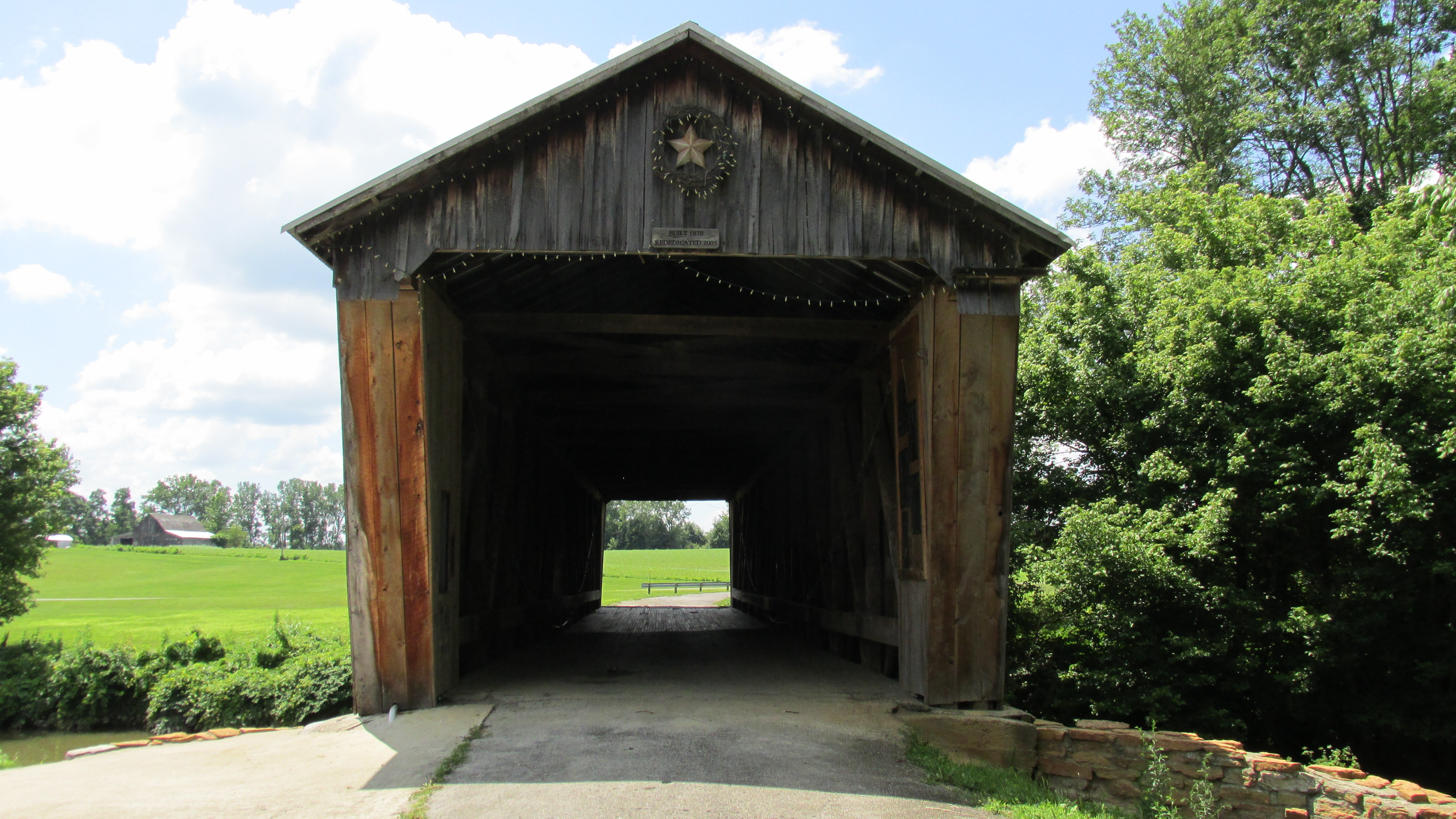

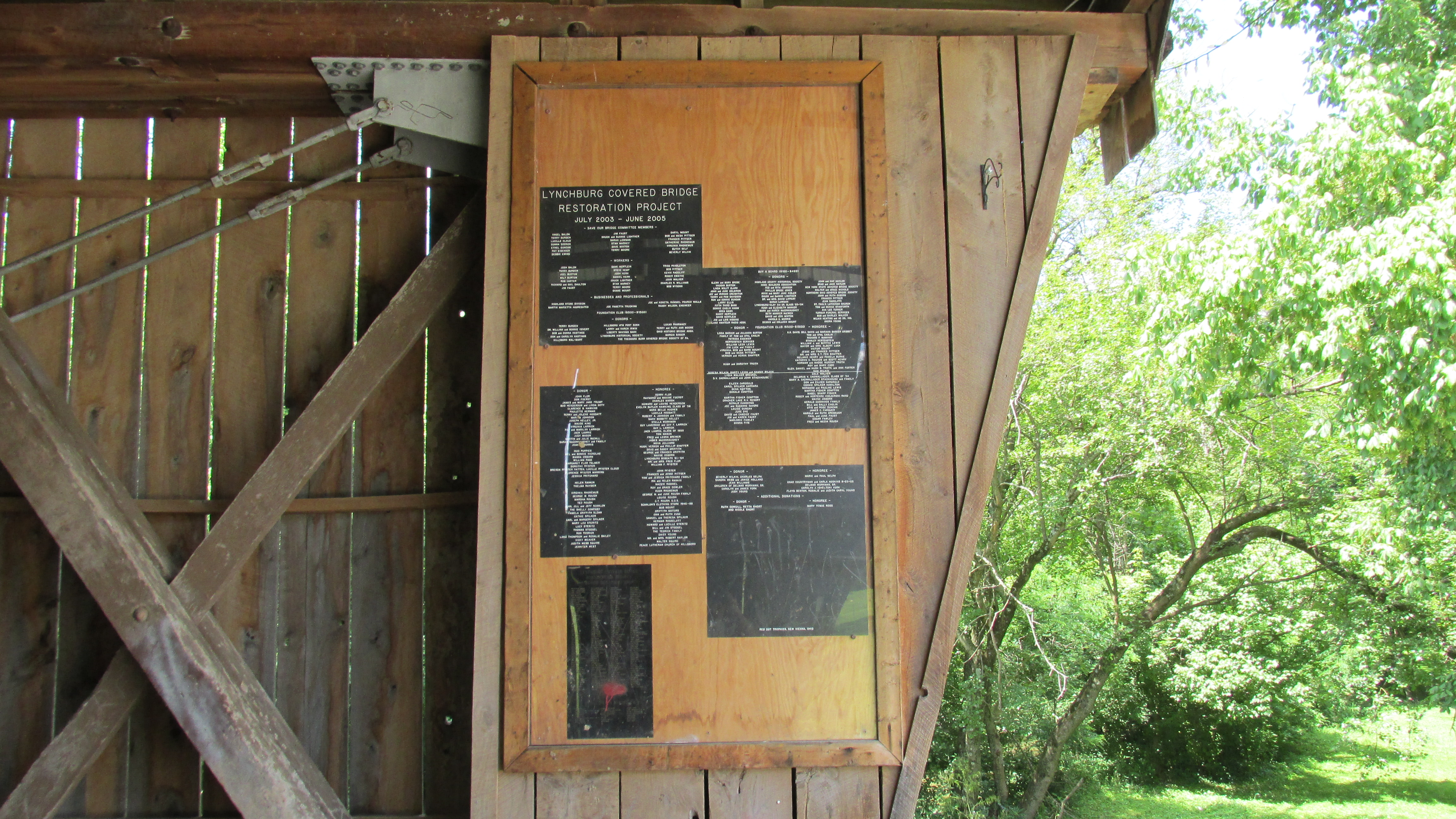

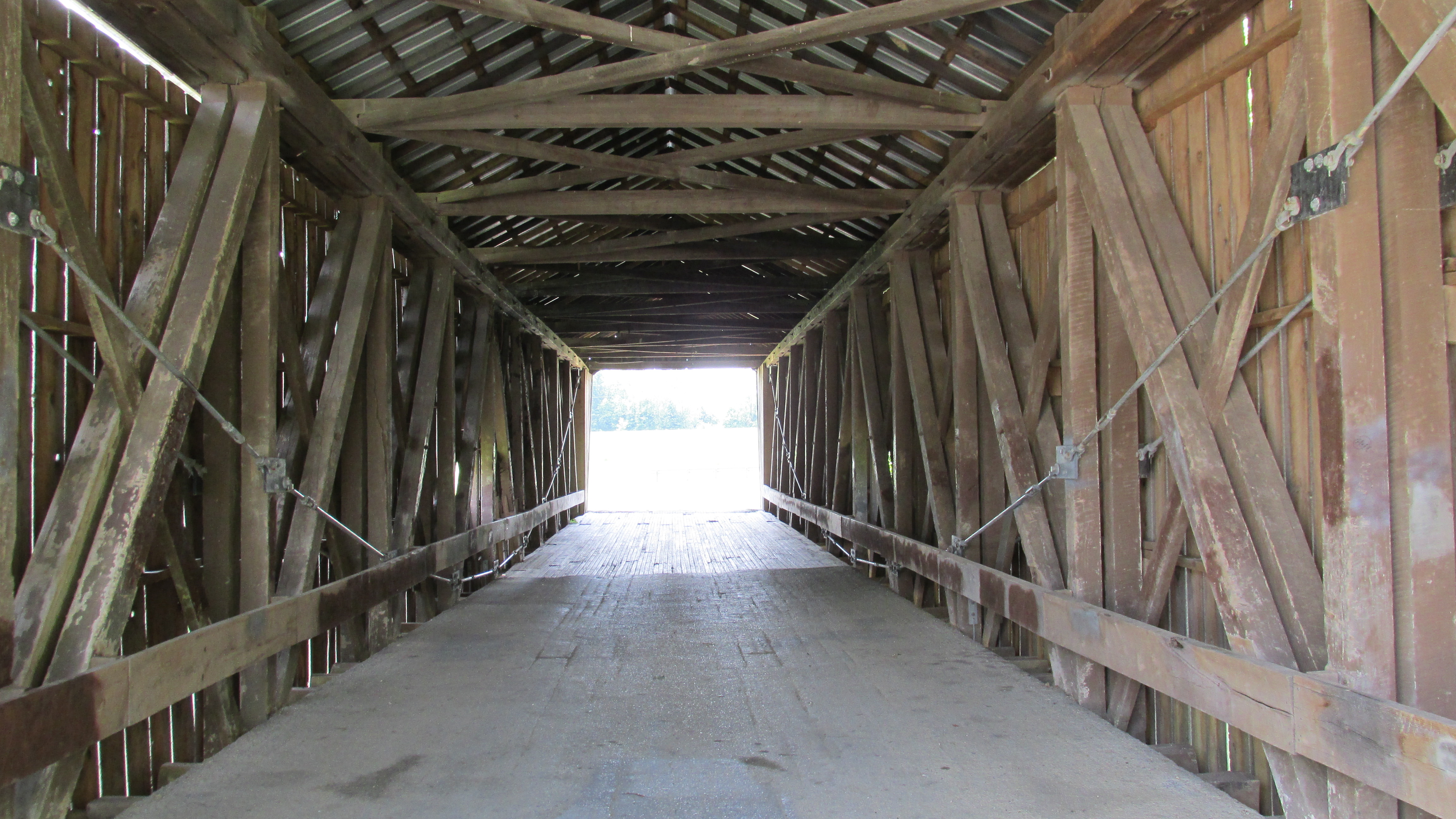

== History ==
On October 11, 1869, a Notice to Contractors was posted by the Highland County Auditor's Office calling for sealed bids for the construction of the Lynchburg Covered Bridge. In 1870 the bridge was constructed for a cost of $3138.66 by local bridge builder John C. Gregg of Hillsboro, who had built a number of bridges in the area. The bridge was completed in December 1870. It occupies a site at which a gristmill and sawmill once operated by the power of the Little Miami.

Following the 1963 announcement of plans to demolish the bridge, a community-wide debate arose and a letter writing campaign for its preservation was begun. Ohio Governor James A. Rhodes agreed to assist in saving the landmark, but it was ultimately decided that the state had no jurisdiction in the matter, since the bridge did not exist on a state highway. The Highland County Board of Commissioners eventually agreed, after strong community input, to allow the bridge to remain in place.

In 1969 a new bridge was constructed over the Little Miami River, allowing access to Lynchburg from Clinton County. The Lynchburg Covered Bridge was retired from active service and closed to traffic and Clinton County relinquished rights to the bridge. Five years later, the bridge sustained severe storm damage when high winds blew most of the roof into the Little Miami River. Materials were donated for repairs, and the Lynchburg Historical Foundation launched a fund raising campaign, which raised a further $6000 for repairs. The restoration and renovation was eventually carried out by volunteers.

The Ohio Historic Bridge Society applied to have the bridge designated as an historic landmark, and the bridge was so designated on March 16, 1976, with its addition to the National Register of Historic Places. Ohio's only covered bridge spanning a county line, it was one of eight surviving Long truss covered bridges at the time of its designation.

== Social impact on the local community ==
The Lynchburg Covered Bridge, and the surrounding Ruth Cramton Memorial Park, has become a center for social gatherings and activities for the greater Lynchburg community. Since the 1980s several major seasonal events have called the historic bridge home, including several annual covered bridge festivals, civil war reenactments, car shows, motor cycle gatherings, and many local social bazaars. In the 1980s the Highland County/Clinton County rivalry culminated in both counties gathering at the bridge, which covers the boundary between the two at its center, for a tug of war contest that became quite the local community event. Since the time of the park's establishment, it has also become a highly utilized place for organizations and families to hold private events, as well, more so than any other community venue.
