= Ohio State Route 321 =

State highway in Highland County, Ohio, US

State Route 321

Route information
- Maintained by ODOT
- Length: 9.07 mi (14.60 km)
- Existed: 1932–present

Major junctions
- West end: SR 134 in Buford
- East end: US 62 near Mowrystown

Location
- Country: United States
- State: Ohio
- Counties: Highland

Highway system
- Ohio State Highway System; Interstate; US; State; Scenic
← SR 320	→ US 322

State Route 321 (SR 321) is a short 9.07-mile (14.60 km) long state highway in southwestern Highland County, Ohio. The route connects SR 134 in Buford and US 62 with the village of Mowrystown.

== Route description ==
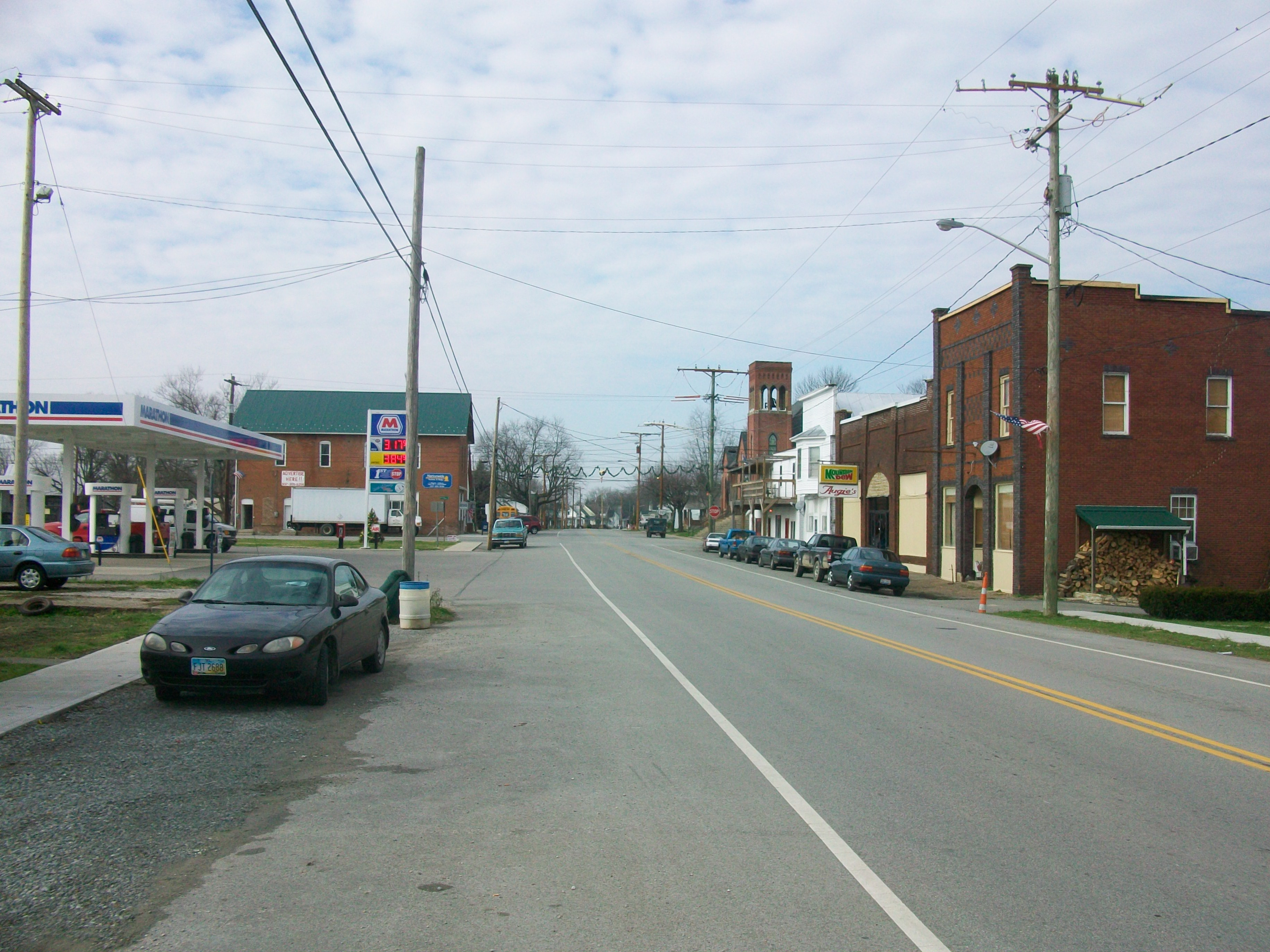
SR 321 (Main Street) in Mowrystown

The state route begins at a T-intersection with SR 134 in Buford, an unincorporated community within Clay Township. This intersection is located about 0.1 miles (0.16 km) south of the southern terminus of SR 138. SR 321 heads southeast through Clay and White Oak Township through a mix of single-family homes and farmland. Five miles (8 km) into the route, the road reaches the village limits of Mowrystown where the route is also known as Main Street. The route exits the village and crosses the White Oak Creek before curving to the northeast through more farmland. The road ends at a skewed T-intersection with US 62 on the border of White Oak and Concord Townships.

No part of the route is included within the National Highway System.

== History ==
The first part of SR 321 brought into the state highway system was a gravel-paved spur from US 62 to Mowrystown circa 1932. By 1935, the route was extended to its present western terminus at SR 134. The entire route was paved by 1941 and since then, no major changes have occurred to the routing.

== Major intersections ==
The entire route is in Highland County.

Location	mi	km	Destinations	Notes
Clay Township	0.00	0.00	SR 134	
White Oak–Concord township line	9.07	14.60	US 62 – Hillsboro, Russellville	
1.000 mi = 1.609 km; 1.000 km = 0.621 mi
