= Lynchburg, Ohio =

- Village
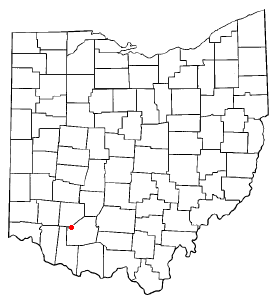
- Location of Lynchburg, Ohio

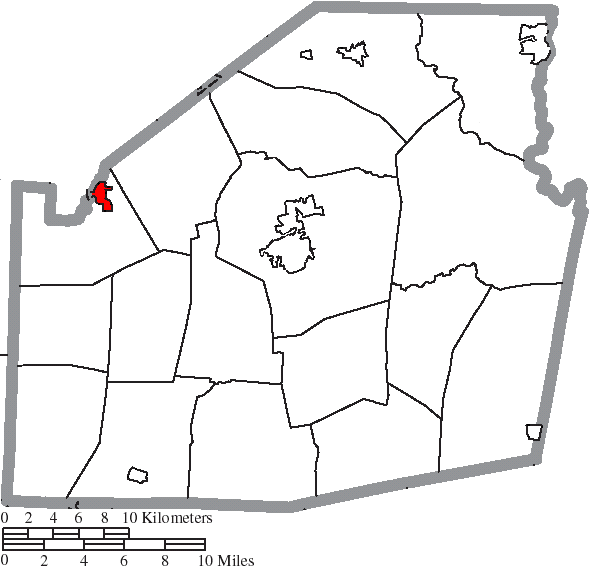
- Location of Lynchburg in Highland County
- Coordinates: 39°14′40″N 83°47′16″W
- Country: United States
- State: Ohio
- Counties: Highland, Clinton

Area
  - Total: 0.93 sq mi (2.41 km^{2})
  - Land: 0.92 sq mi (2.39 km^{2})
  - Water: 0.0077 sq mi (0.02 km^{2})
- Elevation: 1,024 ft (312 m)

Population (2020)
  - Total: 1,510
  - Density: 1,635.8/sq mi (631.58/km^{2})
- Time zone: UTC-5 (Eastern (EST))
  - Summer (DST): UTC-4 (EDT)
- ZIP code: 45142
- Area codes: 937, 326
- FIPS code: 39-45542
- GNIS feature ID: 2399207
- Website: https://www.lynchburgohio.org/

Lynchburg is a village in Clinton and Highland counties in the U.S. state of Ohio. The population was 1,510 at the 2020 census.

== History ==
Lynchburg was platted in 1830, and named after Lynchburg, Virginia, the birthplace of a first settler.

Lynchburg Covered Bridge was added in 1976 to the National Register of Historic Places.

== Geography ==
According to the United States Census Bureau, the village has a total area of 0.95 square miles (2.46 km^{2}), of which 0.94 square miles (2.43 km^{2}) is land and 0.01 square miles (0.03 km^{2}) is water.

== Demographics ==
Historical population
Census	Pop.	Note	%±
1870	476		—
1880	664		39.5%
1890	763		14.9%
1900	907		18.9%
1910	923		1.8%
1920	898		−2.7%
1930	792		−11.8%
1940	833		5.2%
1950	972		16.7%
1960	1,022		5.1%
1970	1,186		16.0%
1980	1,205		1.6%
1990	1,212		0.6%
2000	1,350		11.4%
2010	1,499		11.0%
2020	1,510		0.7%
U.S. Decennial Census

=== 2010 census ===
As of the census of 2010, there were 1,499 people, 575 households, and 397 families living in the village. The population density was 1,594.7 inhabitants per square mile (615.7/km^{2}). There were 654 housing units at an average density of 695.7 per square mile (268.6/km^{2}). The racial makeup of the village was 98.8% White, 0.3% from other races, and 0.9% from two or more races. Hispanic or Latino of any race were 0.8% of the population.

There were 575 households, of which 38.8% had children under the age of 18 living with them, 48.3% were married couples living together, 15.1% had a female householder with no husband present, 5.6% had a male householder with no wife present, and 31.0% were non-families. 24.9% of all households were made up of individuals, and 13.6% had someone living alone who was 65 years of age or older. The average household size was 2.61 and the average family size was 3.12.

The median age in the village was 35.5 years. 27.4% of residents were under the age of 18; 7.8% were between the ages of 18 and 24; 28% were from 25 to 44; 22.6% were from 45 to 64; and 14% were 65 years of age or older. The gender makeup of the village was 47.4% male and 52.6% female.

=== 2000 census ===
As of the census of 2000, there were 1,350 people, 518 households, and 365 families living in the village. The population density was 1,538.4 inhabitants per square mile (594.0/km^{2}). There were 557 housing units at an average density of 634.7 per square mile (245.1/km^{2}). The racial makeup of the village was 98.67% White, 0.30% African American, 0.22% Native American, 0.15% Asian, and 0.67% from two or more races. Hispanic or Latino of any race were 0.07% of the population.

There were 518 households, out of which 36.9% had children under the age of 18 living with them, 55.4% were married couples living together, 11.6% had a female householder with no husband present, and 29.5% were non-families. 26.3% of all households were made up of individuals, and 12.5% had someone living alone who was 65 years of age or older. The average household size was 2.61 and the average family size was 3.14.

In the village, the population was spread out, with 29.9% under the age of 18, 7.2% from 18 to 24, 31.9% from 25 to 44, 18.5% from 45 to 64, and 12.5% who were 65 years of age or older. The median age was 33 years. For every 100 females there were 90.4 males. For every 100 females age 18 and over, there were 88.6 males.

The median income for a household in the village was $34,792, and the median income for a family was $41,375. Males had a median income of $30,337 versus $22,422 for females. The per capita income for the village was $16,315. About 6.0% of families and 9.1% of the population were below the poverty line, including 10.4% of those under age 18 and 12.3% of those age 65 or over.

== Education ==
Lynchburg-Clay Local School District operates one elementary school, one middle school, and Lynchburg-Clay High School.

Lynchburg has a public library, a branch of the Highland County District Library.
