= U.S. Route 322 =

Highway in the United States

U.S. Route 322
- US 322 highlighted in red

Route information
- Auxiliary route of US 22
- Length: 494 mi (795 km)
- Existed: 1926–present

Major junctions
- West end: US 6 / US 20 at Public Square in Cleveland, OH
- I-90 in Cleveland, OH; I-271 in Mayfield Heights, OH; I-79 in Meadville, PA; I-80 near Clarion, PA; I-99 / US 220 from Port Matilda to State College, PA; I-81 / I-83 in Harrisburg, PA; I-95 in Chester, PA; I-295 in Logan Township, NJ; N.J. Turnpike near Swedesboro, NJ; G.S. Parkway in Egg Harbor Township, NJ
- East end: US 40 / Atlantic Avenue / Pacific Avenue in Atlantic City, NJ

Location
- Country: United States
- States: Ohio, Pennsylvania, New Jersey

Highway system
- United States Numbered Highway System; List; Special; Divided
← SR 321	OH	→ SR 323

U.S. Route 322 (US 322) is a 494-mile-long (795 km), east–west United States Highway, traversing Ohio, Pennsylvania, and New Jersey. The road is a spur of US 22 and one of the original highways from 1926. A portion of it was at one time concurrent with the Lakes-to-Sea Highway.

== Route description ==
Lengths
	mi	km
OH	62	99
PA	370	595
NJ	62	99

=== Ohio ===
US 322 begins at the intersection of Superior Avenue and East Roadway at Public Square in Downtown Cleveland, just northeast of the junction of U.S. Routes US 6, US 42, and State Route 3 (Superior Avenue) with US 422 and State Route 8, State Route 14, State Route 43, and State Route 87 (Ontario Street). East of Public Square, the route runs eastward through midtown Cleveland conjoined with US 6 along Superior Avenue. Northwest of Cleveland State University, US 322 turns south onto 13th Street and runs eastward (as Chester Avenue) through Playhouse Square. Exiting the commercial district, US 322 interchanges Interstate 90, at exit 173. In University Circle, US 322 is briefly concurrent with U.S. Route 20 (Euclid Avenue), running through the campus of Case Western Reserve University. The overlap terminates at the eastern edge of University Circle, where US 322 splits off to the south by southwest, becoming Mayfield Road as it enters Little Italy, and through the eastern suburbs of Cleveland Heights, South Euclid, Lyndhurst, Mayfield Heights, and Gates Mills, continuing on as Mayfield until the Geauga County/Ashtabula County line.

In Geauga County, US 322 passes through suburban Chester Township and into Ohio's second largest Amish community, which includes the rural townships of Claridon, Huntsburg, Windsor Township and the west side of Orwell Township. In Ashtabula County, US 322 crosses through Windsor Township, Orwell Township, the village of Orwell, Colebrook Township, Wayne Township and Williamsfield Township before crossing the Ohio-Pennsylvania state line south of Pymatuning Reservoir.

=== Pennsylvania ===
US 322 enters Pennsylvania from Ohio in West Shenango Township. From this point, the road continues east, forming a concurrency with U.S. Route 6 between Conneaut Lake and Meadville, interchanging with Interstate 79 and intersecting U.S. Route 19 in Meadville. In Franklin, the route crosses U.S. Route 62. Continuing east, US 322 interchanges with Interstate 80 near Clarion before meeting U.S. Route 119 and U.S. Route 219 south of DuBois. US 322 heads southeast as a surface road before merging onto the Interstate 99/U.S. Route 220 freeway in Port Matilda, following that east to State College. The US 322 freeway continues past I-99 before ending to the east of State College. Near Potters Mills, US 322 becomes a freeway again and intersects U.S. Route 22 and U.S. Route 522 in Lewistown, forming a long concurrency with the former.

The US 22/US 322 freeway continues across the Appalachian Mountains, meeting U.S. Route 11/U.S. Route 15 prior to crossing the Susquehanna River by way of the Clarks Ferry Bridge. The road continues south along the east bank of the river to Harrisburg, where US 322 splits from US 22 by heading east onto Interstate 81 and then south onto Interstate 83. At the interchange between I-83 and the northern terminus of Interstate 283, US 322 turns east and heads to Hershey, intersecting U.S. Route 422. From this point, US 322 heads southeast through the Pennsylvania Dutch Country, intersecting U.S. Route 222 at a diverging diamond interchange near Ephrata. In Downingtown, the route crosses U.S. Route 30 before heading to West Chester. Here, US 322 bypasses the town and merges onto a freeway alignment along with U.S. Route 202 that ends to the south of West Chester. US 322 follows US 202 until Painters Crossing, where it turns east onto U.S. Route 1. In Concordville, US 322 splits from US 1 and heads southeast to Chester. In Chester, the route forms a brief concurrency with Interstate 95 before heading southeast and interchanging with U.S. Route 13 prior to the Commodore Barry Bridge over the Delaware River.

=== New Jersey ===
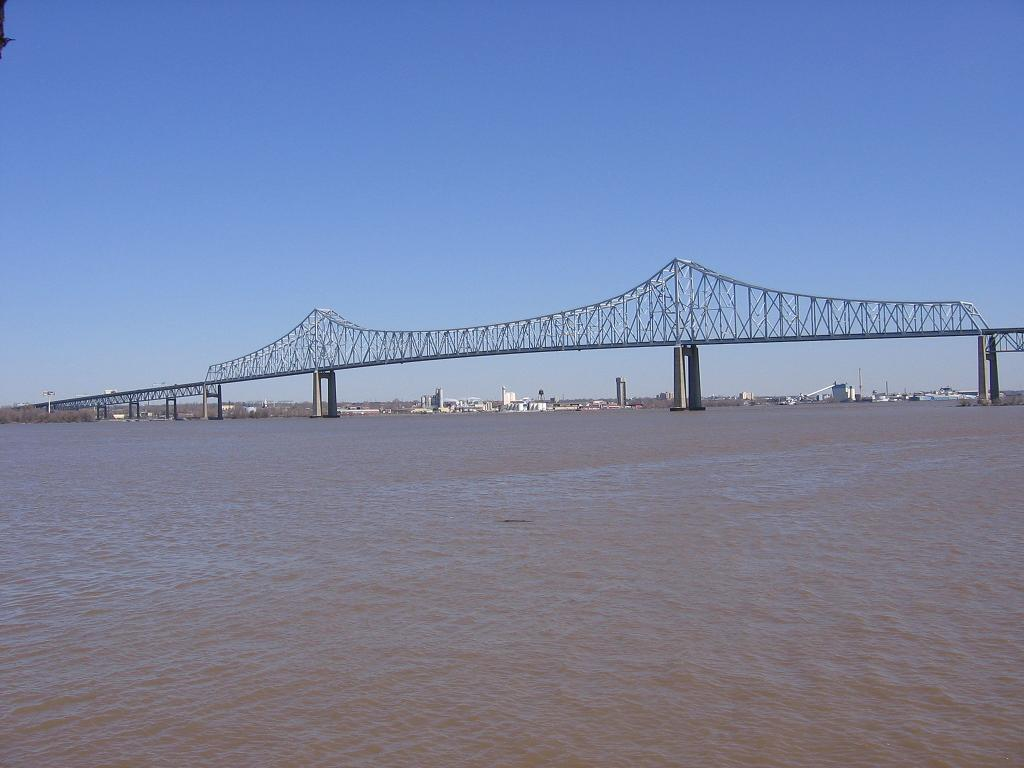
US 322 crossing the Delaware River on the Commodore Barry Bridge.

US 322 enters New Jersey via the Commodore Barry Bridge just north of Delaware and interchanges with Interstate 295 and the New Jersey Turnpike before entering historic Mullica Hill. In Glassboro, it bisects Rowan University. At Williamstown, US 322 goes onto the Black Horse Pike (picking up where Route 42 ends) and follows it the rest of the way to Atlantic City, being concurrent with U.S. Route 40 from Mays Landing on east. In the 1960s and 1970s, the New Jersey Department of Transportation (NJDOT) had planned for a freeway bypass of U.S. Route 322 around Glassboro. Later it was planned as a New Jersey Turnpike extension, but all plans were dropped due to budget cuts and mounting opposition.

== Major intersections ==
Ohio
US 6 / US 20 / Public Square in Cleveland. US 6/US 322 travels concurrently through Cleveland.
I-90 in Cleveland
US 20 in Cleveland. The highways travel concurrently through Cleveland.
I-271 in Mayfield Heights
Pennsylvania
US 6 in Conneaut Lake. The highways travel concurrently to Meadville.
US 19 south-southwest of Fredericksburg. The highways travel concurrently to Meadville.
I-79 in Fredericksburg
US 62 in Franklin. The highways travel concurrently through Franklin.
I-80 west of Corsica
US 119 south-southwest of Sandy
US 219 south-southeast of Sandy. The highways travel concurrently to Luthersburg.
I-99 / US 220 north-northwest of Port Matilda. The highways travel concurrently to Pennsylvania State University west of Houserville.
US 22 / US 522 in Highland Park. US 22/US 322 travels concurrently to Harrisburg. US 322/US 522 travels concurrently to Lewistown as well.
US 11 / US 15 north-northeast of Duncannon
I-81 in Harrisburg. I-81/US 322 travels concurrently to the Progress–Colonial Park CDP line.
I-83 on the Progress–Colonial Park CDP line. I-83/US 322 travels concurrently to west of Lawnton.
US 22 on the Progress–Colonial Park CDP line
US 422 in Hershey
US 222 southeast of Ephrata
US 30 west-northwest of Downingtown
US 202 northeast of West Chester. The highways travel concurrently to west-southwest of Concordville.
US 1 / US 202 west-southwest of Concordville. US 1/US 322 travels concurrently to Concordville.
I-95 in Chester. The highways travel concurrently through Chester.
US 13 in Chester
New Jersey
US 130 in Bridgeport
I-295 south-southeast of Bridgeport
US 40 in McKee City. The highways travel concurrently to Atlantic City.
US 9 in Pleasantville
Atlantic Avenue / Pacific Avenue in Atlantic City

== See also ==
Browse numbered routes
← SR 321	OH	→ SR 323
