= Mowrystown, Ohio =

- Village
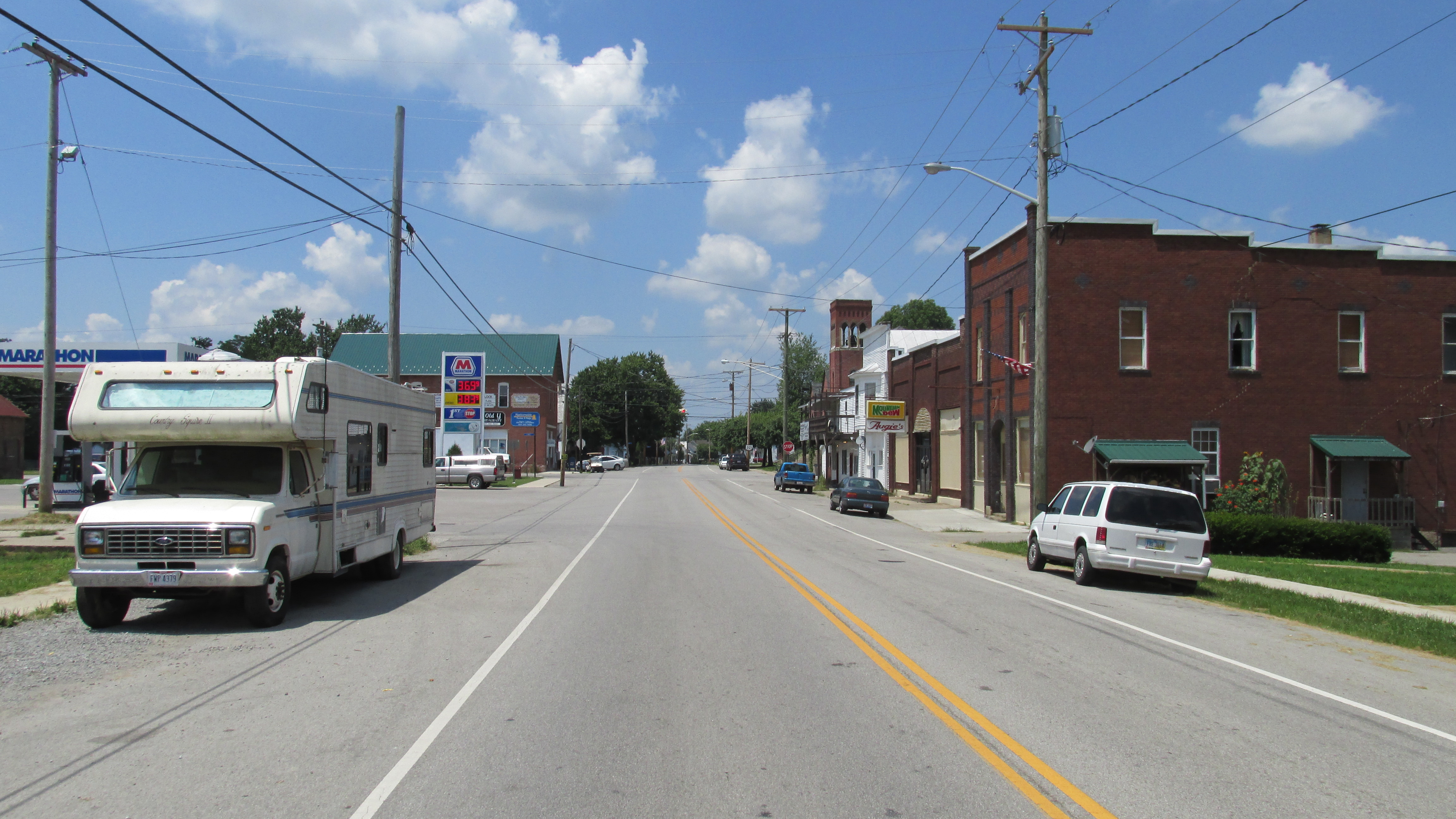
- Looking west on Main Street

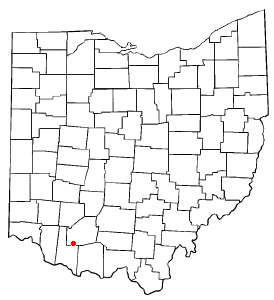
- Location of Mowrystown, Ohio

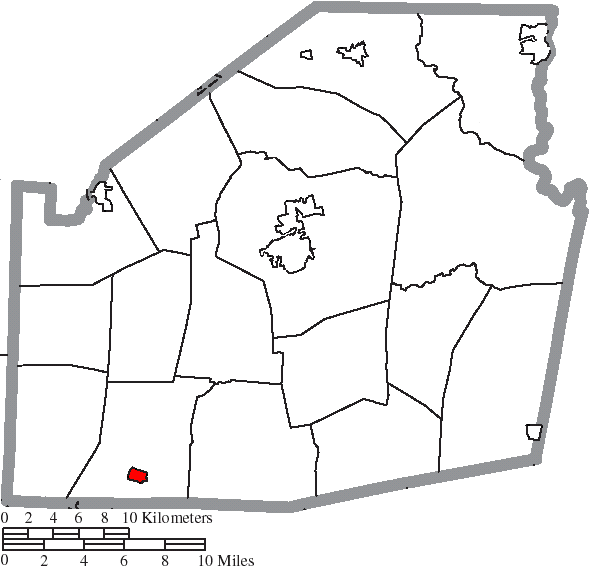
- Location of Mowrystown in Highland County
- Coordinates: 39°02′25″N 83°45′00″W
- Country: United States
- State: Ohio
- County: Highland

Area
  - Total: 0.49 sq mi (1.27 km^{2})
  - Land: 0.48 sq mi (1.25 km^{2})
  - Water: 0.0077 sq mi (0.02 km^{2})
- Elevation: 991 ft (302 m)

Population (2020)
  - Total: 385
  - Density: 798.4/sq mi (308.28/km^{2})
- Time zone: UTC-5 (Eastern (EST))
  - Summer (DST): UTC-4 (EDT)
- ZIP code: 45155
- Area codes: 937, 326
- FIPS code: 39-53186
- GNIS feature ID: 2399421

Mowrystown is a village in Highland County, Ohio, United States. The population was 385 at the 2020 census.

== Geography ==
According to the United States Census Bureau, the village has a total area of 0.49 square miles (1.27 km^{2}), of which 0.48 square miles (1.24 km^{2}) is land and 0.01 square miles (0.03 km^{2}) is water.

== Demographics ==
Historical population
Census	Pop.	Note	%±
1870	414		—
1880	120		−71.0%
1910	326		—
1920	350		7.4%
1930	372		6.3%
1940	427		14.8%
1950	394		−7.7%
1960	416		5.6%
1970	465		11.8%
1980	475		2.2%
1990	460		−3.2%
2000	373		−18.9%
2010	360		−3.5%
2020	385		6.9%
U.S. Decennial Census

=== 2010 census ===
As of the census of 2010, there were 360 people, 129 households, and 92 families living in the village. The population density was 750.0 inhabitants per square mile (289.6/km^{2}). There were 152 housing units at an average density of 316.7 per square mile (122.3/km^{2}). The racial makeup of the village was 99.7% White and 0.3% from two or more races.

There were 129 households, of which 38.0% had children under the age of 18 living with them, 46.5% were married couples living together, 17.8% had a female householder with no husband present, 7.0% had a male householder with no wife present, and 28.7% were non-families. 23.3% of all households were made up of individuals, and 12.4% had someone living alone who was 65 years of age or older. The average household size was 2.79 and the average family size was 3.27.

The median age in the village was 34.8 years. 28.1% of residents were under the age of 18; 7.5% were between the ages of 18 and 24; 27.6% were from 25 to 44; 21.9% were from 45 to 64; and 15% were 65 years of age or older. The gender makeup of the village was 50.6% male and 49.4% female.

=== 2000 census ===
As of the census of 2000, there were 373 people, 143 households, and 103 families living in the village. The population density was 772.8 inhabitants per square mile (298.4/km^{2}). There were 162 housing units at an average density of 335.6 per square mile (129.6/km^{2}). The racial makeup of the village was 98.66% White, 0.80% Pacific Islander, and 0.54% from two or more races.

There were 143 households, out of which 37.8% had children under the age of 18 living with them, 55.2% were married couples living together, 11.9% had a female householder with no husband present, and 27.3% were non-families. 23.1% of all households were made up of individuals, and 8.4% had someone living alone who was 65 years of age or older. The average household size was 2.61 and the average family size was 3.12.

In the village, the population was spread out, with 28.2% under the age of 18, 10.5% from 18 to 24, 27.9% from 25 to 44, 22.5% from 45 to 64, and 11.0% who were 65 years of age or older. The median age was 34 years. For every 100 females there were 107.2 males. For every 100 females age 18 and over, there were 104.6 males.

The median income for a household in the village was $35,956, and the median income for a family was $37,917. Males had a median income of $31,250 versus $20,938 for females. The per capita income for the village was $13,884. About 11.6% of families and 10.1% of the population were below the poverty line, including 17.5% of those under age 18 and 18.8% of those age 65 or over.

== Education ==
Mowrystown is the home of Whiteoak High School, home of the Whiteoak Wildcats.
