= Penn Township, Ohio =

Penn Township, Ohio may refer to:

- Penn Township, Highland County, Ohio
- Penn Township, Morgan County, Ohio
