= Jackson Township, Highland County, Ohio =

Township in Ohio, US

- Township
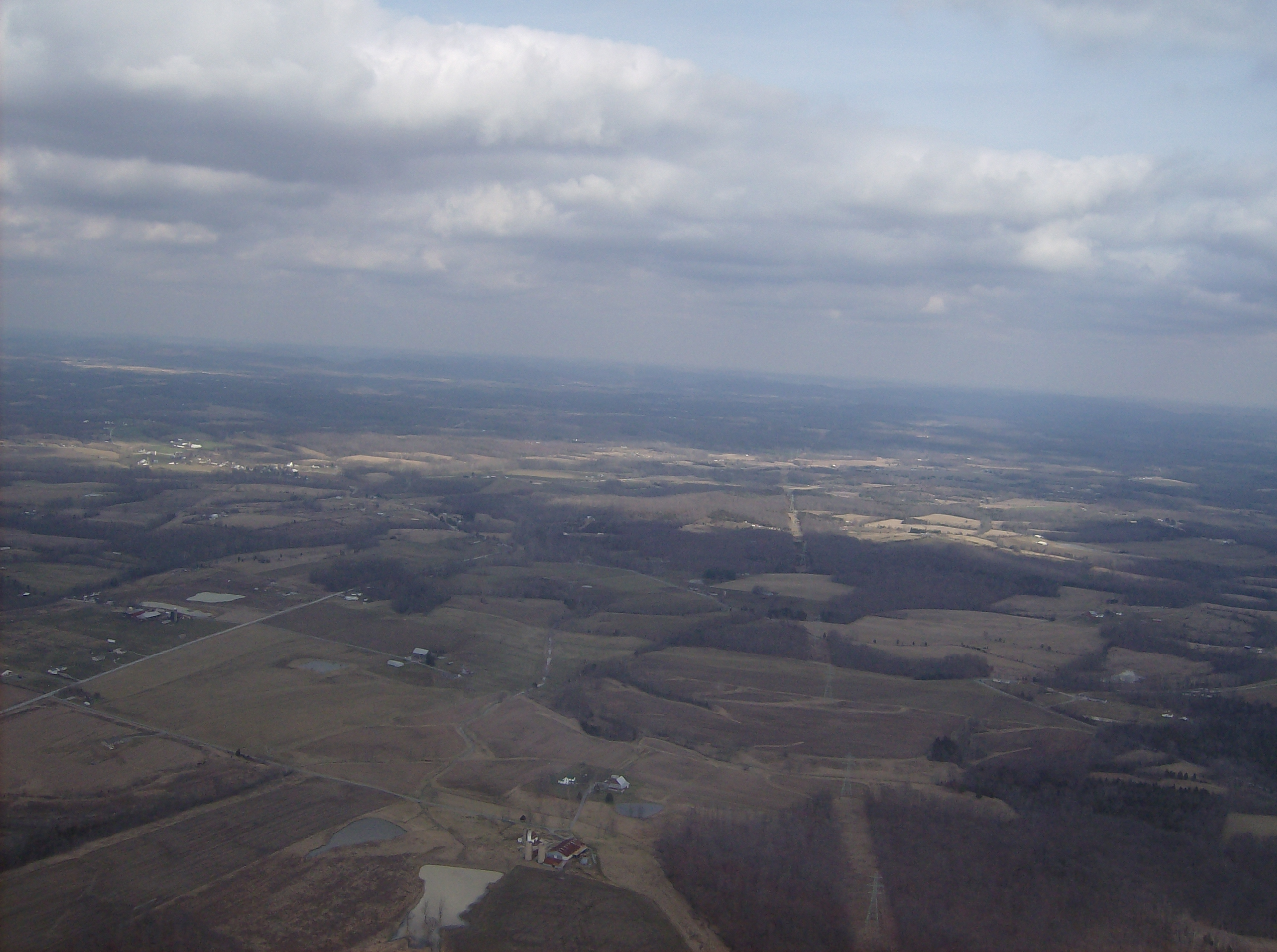
- Countryside in southern Jackson Township

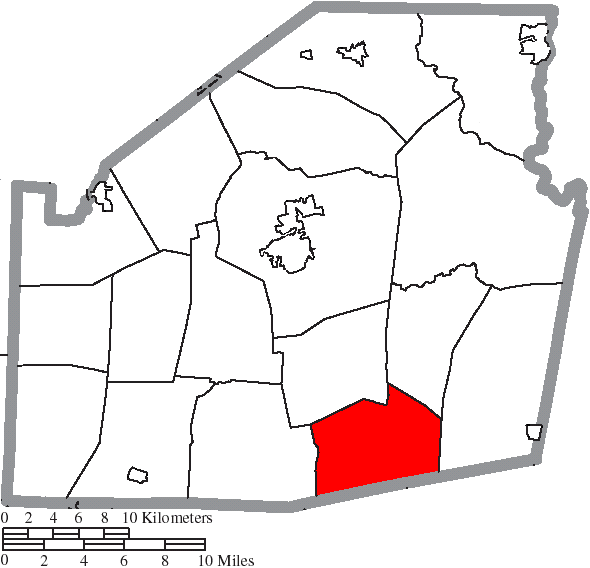
- Location of Jackson Township in Highland County
- Coordinates: 39°3′54″N 83°30′59″W
- Country: United States
- State: Ohio
- County: Highland

Area
  - Total: 25.8 sq mi (66.9 km^{2})
  - Land: 25.8 sq mi (66.9 km^{2})
  - Water: 0 sq mi (0.0 km^{2})
- Elevation: 860 ft (262 m)

Population (2020)
  - Total: 1,053
  - Density: 40.8/sq mi (15.7/km^{2})
- Time zone: UTC-5 (Eastern (EST))
  - Summer (DST): UTC-4 (EDT)
- FIPS code: 39-37828
- GNIS feature ID: 1086305

Jackson Township is one of the seventeen townships of Highland County, Ohio, United States. As of the 2020 census the population was 1,053.

== Geography ==
Located in the southern part of the county, it borders the following townships:

- Marshall Township - northeast
- Brushcreek Township - east
- Bratton Township, Adams County - southeast
- Scott Township, Adams County - south
- Concord Township - west
- Washington Township - northwest

No municipalities are located in Jackson Township.

== Name and history ==
It is one of thirty-seven Jackson Townships statewide.

== Government ==
The township is governed by a three-member board of trustees, who are elected in November of odd-numbered years to a four-year term beginning on the following January 1. Two are elected in the year after the presidential election and one is elected in the year before it. There is also an elected township fiscal officer, who serves a four-year term beginning on April 1 of the year after the election, which is held in November of the year before the presidential election. Vacancies in the fiscal officership or on the board of trustees are filled by the remaining trustees.
