= Hamer Township, Highland County, Ohio =

Township in Ohio, US

- Township
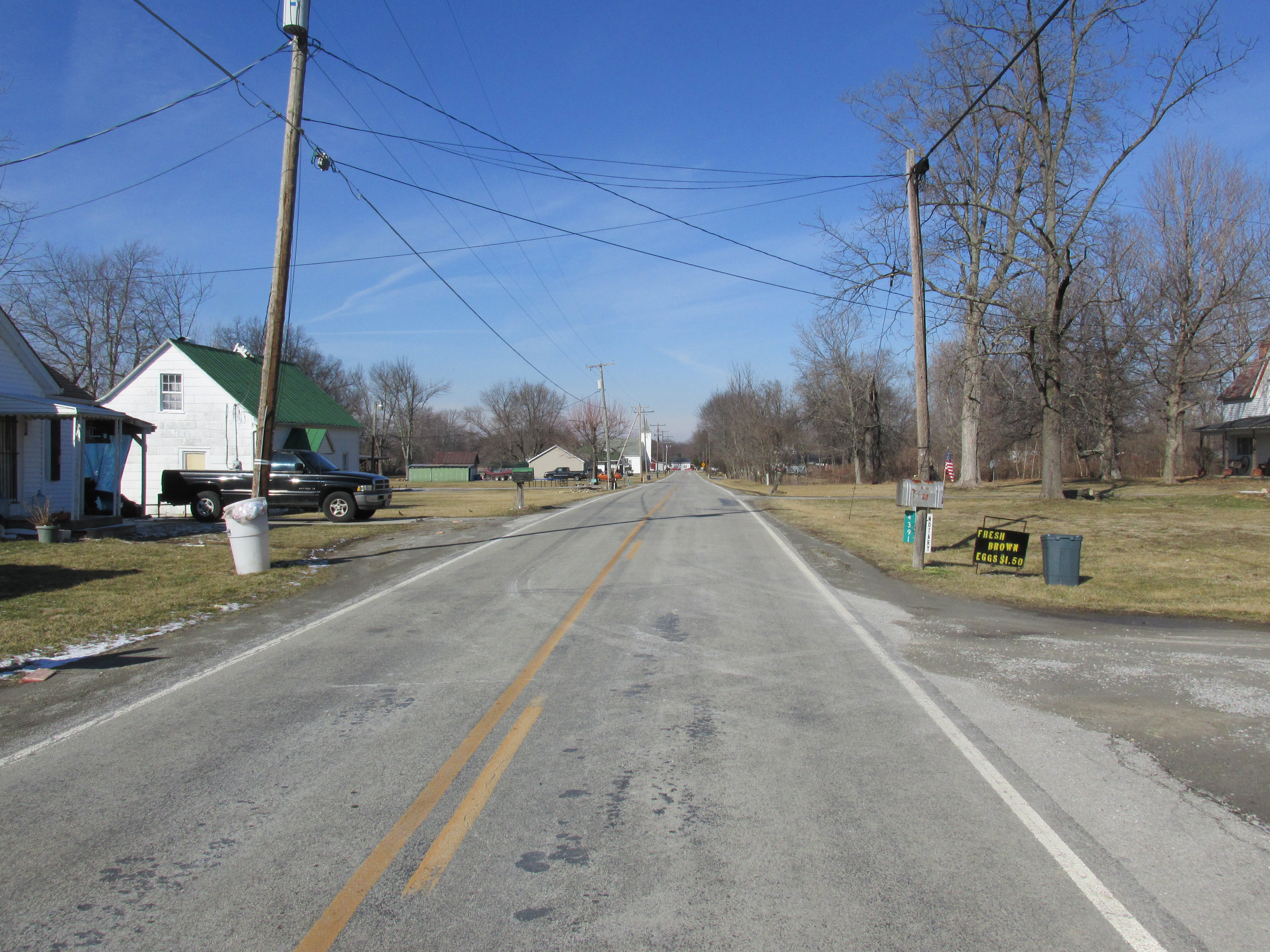
- Road scene in East Danville

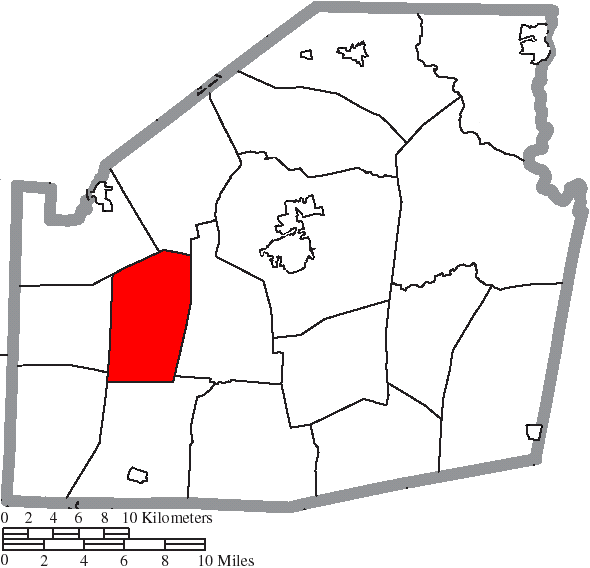
- Location of Hamer Township in Highland County
- Coordinates: 39°8′44″N 83°44′5″W
- Country: United States
- State: Ohio
- County: Highland

Area
  - Total: 22.6 sq mi (58.6 km^{2})
  - Land: 22.5 sq mi (58.4 km^{2})
  - Water: 0.077 sq mi (0.2 km^{2})
- Elevation: 1,070 ft (326 m)

Population (2020)
  - Total: 679
  - Density: 30.1/sq mi (11.6/km^{2})
- Time zone: UTC-5 (Eastern (EST))
  - Summer (DST): UTC-4 (EDT)
- FIPS code: 39-32970
- GNIS feature ID: 1086304

Hamer Township is one of the seventeen townships of Highland County, Ohio, United States. As of the 2020 census the population was 679.

== Geography ==
Located in the western part of the county, it borders the following townships:

- Union Township - north
- New Market Township - east
- Whiteoak Township - south
- Clay Township - southwest
- Salem Township - west
- Dodson Township - northwest

No municipalities are located in Hamer Township, although the unincorporated community of East Danville lies in the township's southeast.

== Name and history ==
It is the only Hamer Township statewide.

== Government ==
The township is governed by a three-member board of trustees, who are elected in November of odd-numbered years to a four-year term beginning on the following January 1. Two are elected in the year after the presidential election and one is elected in the year before it. There is also an elected township fiscal officer, who serves a four-year term beginning on April 1 of the year after the election, which is held in November of the year before the presidential election. Vacancies in the fiscal officership or on the board of trustees are filled by the remaining trustees.
