= Concord Township, Highland County, Ohio =

Township in Ohio, US

- Township
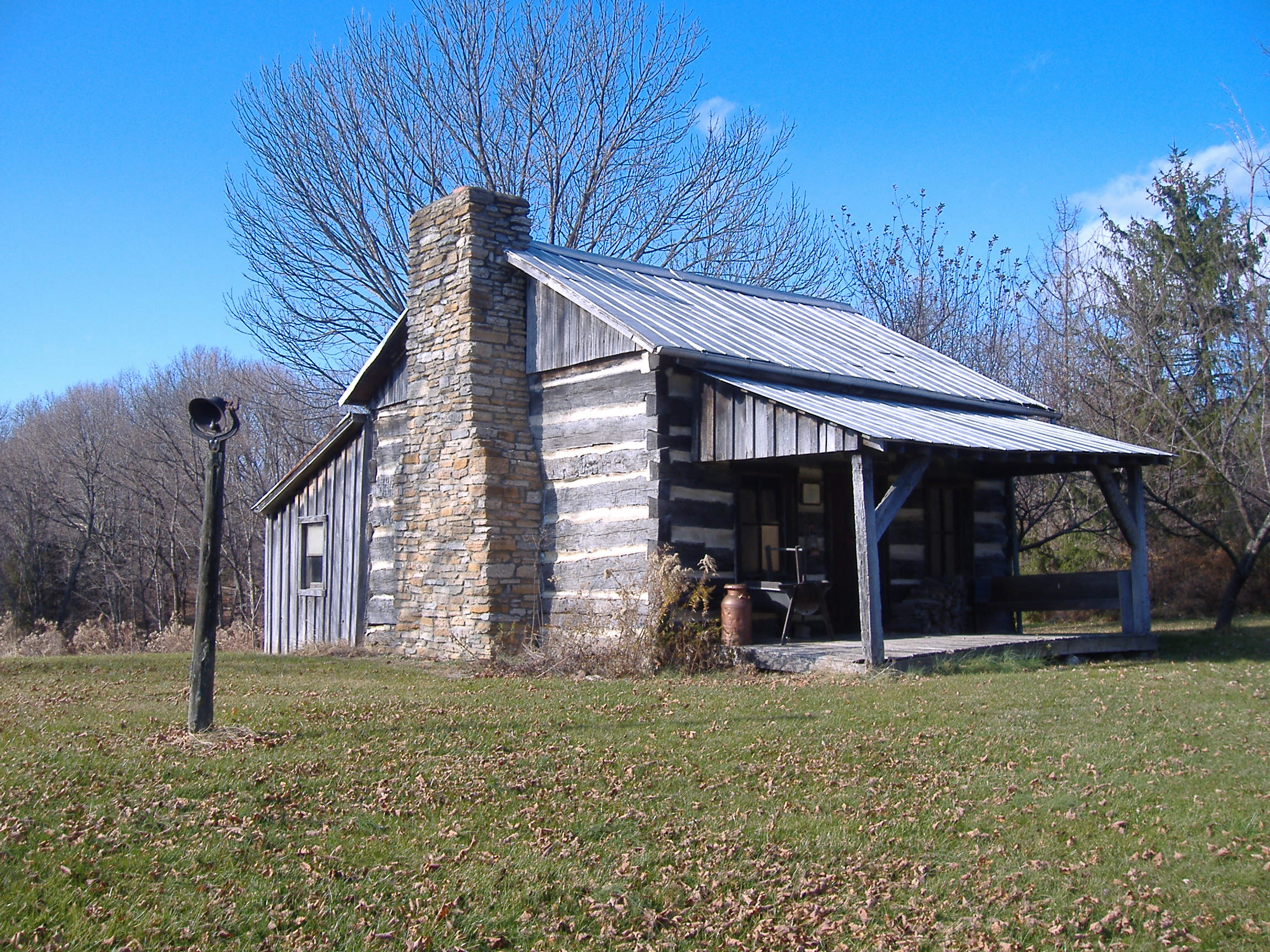
- The Samuel Lyle Log House on Pondlick Road

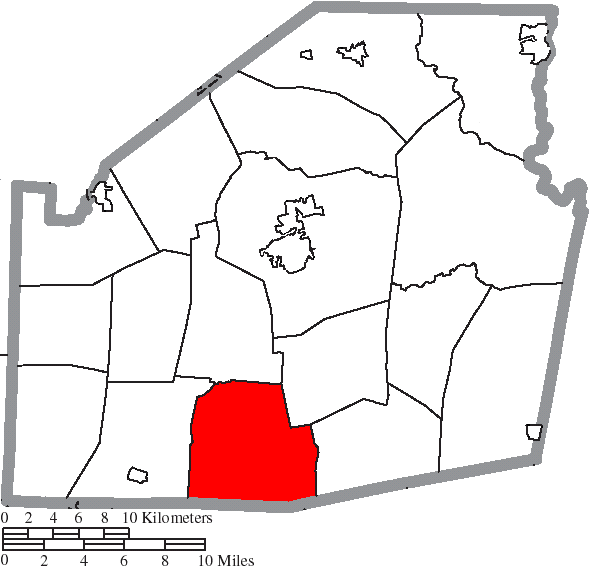
- Location of Concord Township in Highland County
- Coordinates: 39°3′26″N 83°39′34″W
- Country: United States
- State: Ohio
- County: Highland

Area
  - Total: 33.7 sq mi (87.2 km^{2})
  - Land: 33.7 sq mi (87.2 km^{2})
  - Water: 0 sq mi (0.0 km^{2})
- Elevation: 1,053 ft (321 m)

Population (2020)
  - Total: 1,361
  - Density: 40.4/sq mi (15.6/km^{2})
- Time zone: UTC-5 (Eastern (EST))
  - Summer (DST): UTC-4 (EDT)
- FIPS code: 39-18168
- GNIS feature ID: 1086301

Concord Township is one of the seventeen townships of Highland County, Ohio, United States. As of the 2020 census the population was 1,361.

== Geography ==
Located in the southern part of the county, it borders the following townships:

- New Market Township - north
- Washington Township - northeast
- Jackson Township - east
- Scott Township, Adams County - southeast
- Winchester Township, Adams County - south
- Eagle Township, Brown County - southwest
- Whiteoak Township - west

No municipalities are located in Concord Township.

== Name and history ==
It is one of seven Concord Townships statewide.

== Government ==
The township is governed by a three-member board of trustees, who are elected in November of odd-numbered years to a four-year term beginning on the following January 1. Two are elected in the year after the presidential election and one is elected in the year before it. There is also an elected township fiscal officer, who serves a four-year term beginning on April 1 of the year after the election, which is held in November of the year before the presidential election. Vacancies in the fiscal officership or on the board of trustees are filled by the remaining trustees.
