= Washington Township, Highland County, Ohio =

Township in Ohio, US

- Township
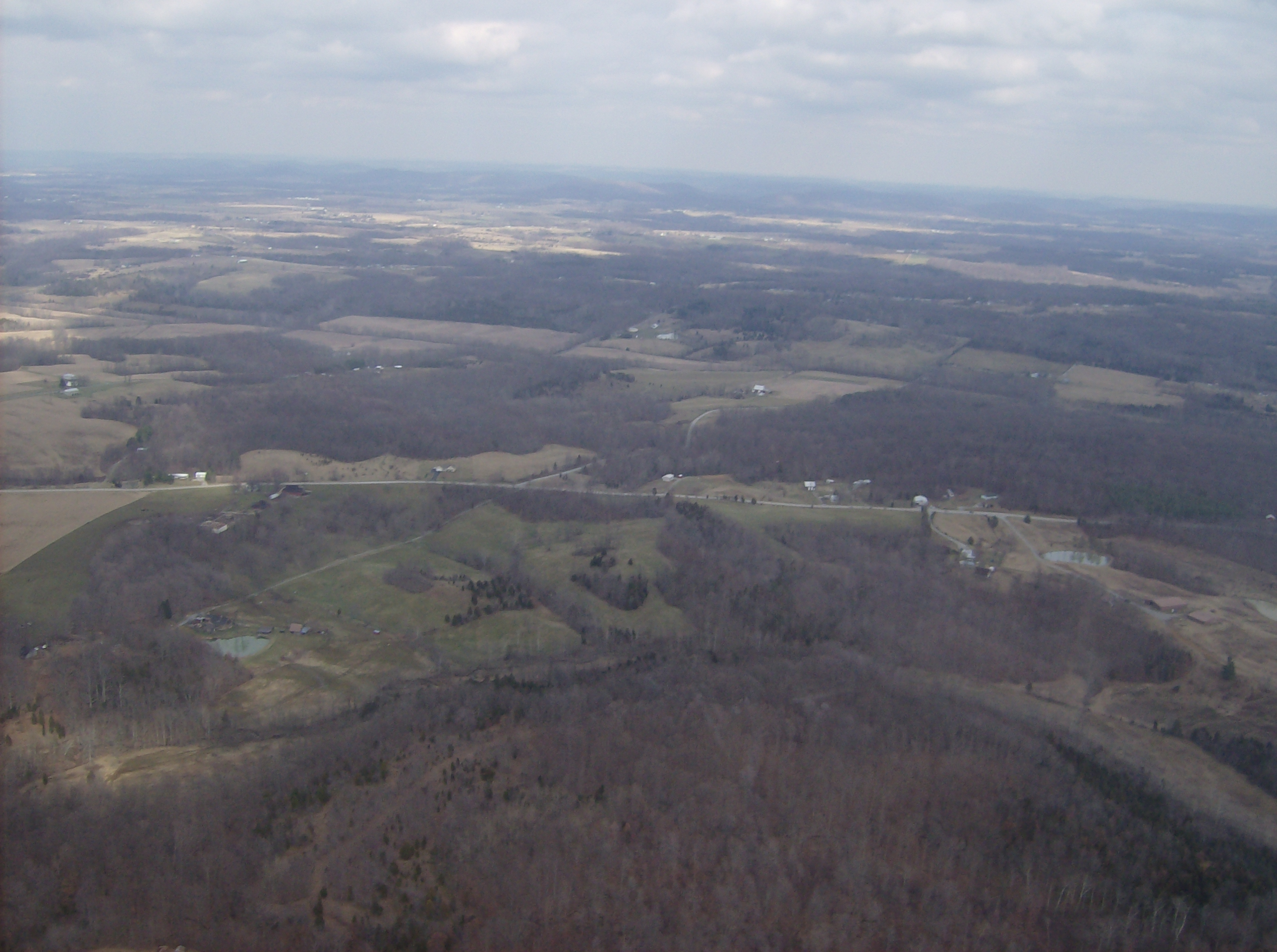
- Forests in southeastern Washington Township

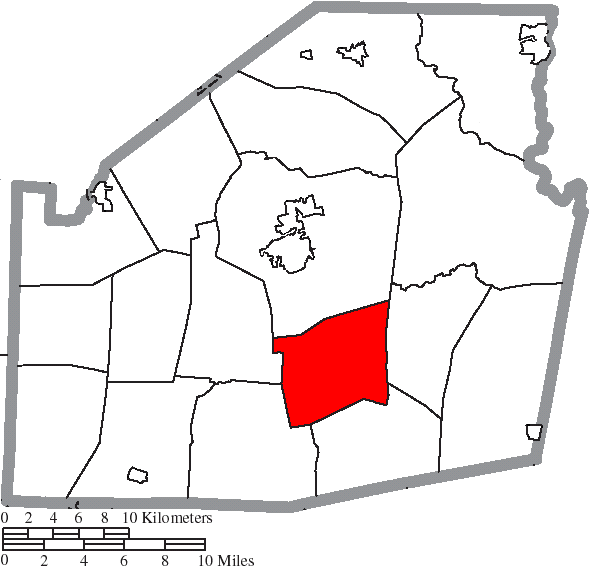
- Location of Washington Township in Highland County
- Coordinates: 39°6′40″N 83°34′9″W
- Country: United States
- State: Ohio
- County: Highland

Area
  - Total: 24.44 sq mi (63.31 km^{2})
  - Land: 24.43 sq mi (63.28 km^{2})
  - Water: 0.012 sq mi (0.03 km^{2})
- Elevation: 1,063 ft (324 m)

Population (2020)
  - Total: 1,096
  - Density: 44.86/sq mi (17.32/km^{2})
- Time zone: UTC-5 (Eastern (EST))
  - Summer (DST): UTC-4 (EDT)
- FIPS code: 39-81340
- GNIS feature ID: 1086314

Washington Township is one of the seventeen townships of Highland County, Ohio, United States. As of the 2020 census the population was 1,096.

== Geography ==
Located in the southern part of the county, it borders the following townships:

- Liberty Township - north
- Marshall Township - east
- Jackson Township - southeast
- Concord Township - southwest
- New Market Township - west

No municipalities are located in Washington Township.

== Name and history ==
It is one of forty-three Washington Townships statewide.

== Government ==
The township is governed by a three-member board of trustees, who are elected in November of odd-numbered years to a four-year term beginning on the following January 1. Two are elected in the year after the presidential election and one is elected in the year before it. There is also an elected township fiscal officer, who serves a four-year term beginning on April 1 of the year after the election, which is held in November of the year before the presidential election. Vacancies in the fiscal officership or on the board of trustees are filled by the remaining trustees.
