= Union Township, Highland County, Ohio =

Township in Ohio, US

- Township
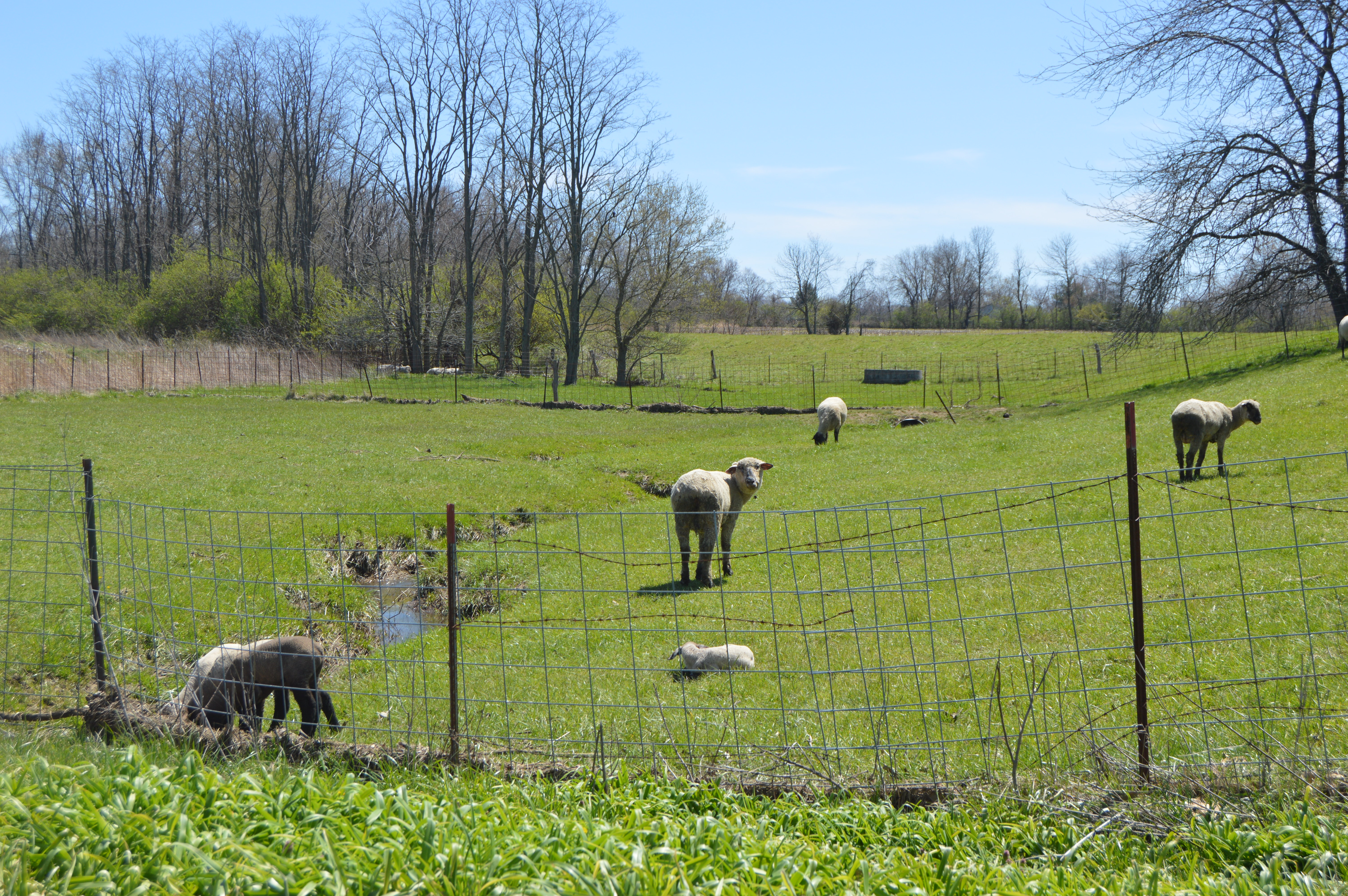
- Sheep pasture on Fisher Road

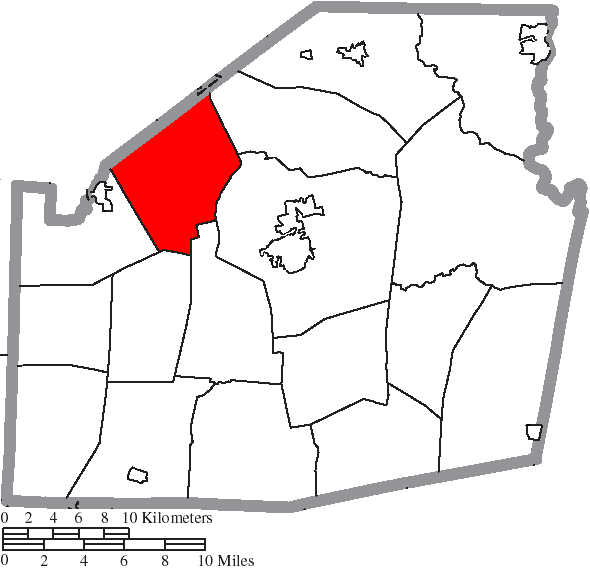
- Location of Union Township in Highland County
- Coordinates: 39°14′59″N 83°43′15″W
- Country: United States
- State: Ohio
- County: Highland

Area
  - Total: 30.10 sq mi (77.95 km^{2})
  - Land: 30.04 sq mi (77.80 km^{2})
  - Water: 0.054 sq mi (0.14 km^{2})
- Elevation: 1,053 ft (321 m)

Population (2020)
  - Total: 1,969
  - Density: 65.55/sq mi (25.31/km^{2})
- Time zone: UTC-5 (Eastern (EST))
  - Summer (DST): UTC-4 (EDT)
- FIPS code: 39-78344
- GNIS feature ID: 1086313

Union Township is one of the seventeen townships of Highland County, Ohio, United States. As of the 2020 census the population was 1,969.

== Geography ==
Located in the northwestern part of the county, it borders the following townships:

- Green Township, Clinton County - north
- Penn Township - northeast
- Liberty Township - southeast
- New Market Township - south, east of Hamer Township
- Hamer Township - south, west of New Market Township
- Dodson Township - southwest
- Clark Township, Clinton County - northwest

No municipalities are located in Union Township.

== Name and history ==
It is one of twenty-seven Union Townships statewide.

== Government ==
The township is governed by a three-member board of trustees, who are elected in November of odd-numbered years to a four-year term beginning on the following January 1. Two are elected in the year after the presidential election and one is elected in the year before it. There is also an elected township fiscal officer, who serves a four-year term beginning on April 1 of the year after the election, which is held in November of the year before the presidential election. Vacancies in the fiscal officership or on the board of trustees are filled by the remaining trustees.
