= Liberty Township, Highland County, Ohio =

Township in Ohio, US

- Township
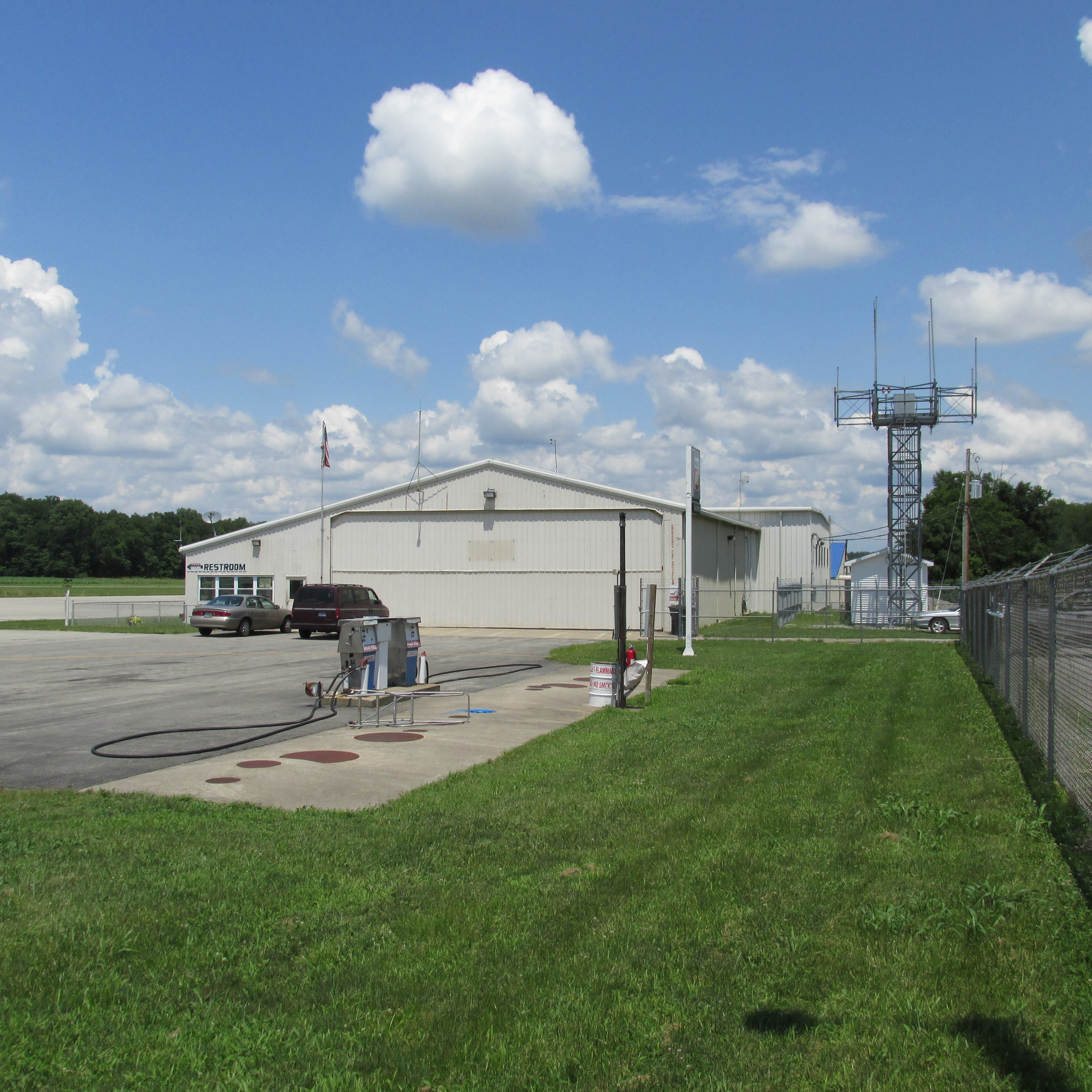
- Scene at the Highland County Airport

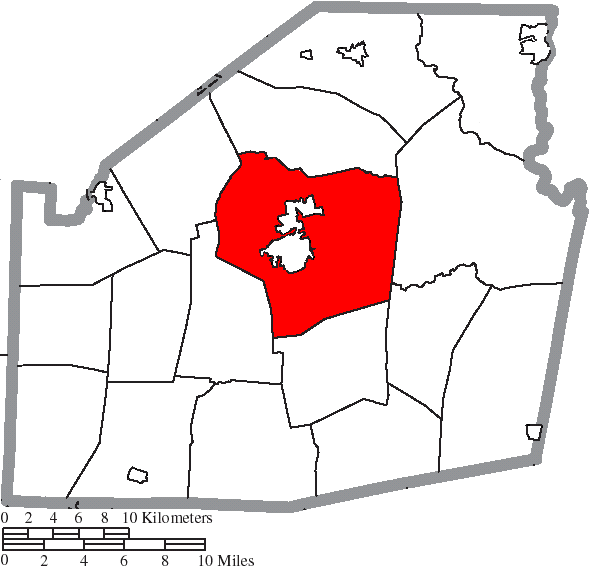
- Location of Liberty Township in Highland County
- Coordinates: 39°12′23″N 83°36′25″W
- Country: United States
- State: Ohio
- County: Highland

Area
  - Total: 59.4 sq mi (153.8 km^{2})
  - Land: 58.8 sq mi (152.4 km^{2})
  - Water: 0.54 sq mi (1.4 km^{2})
- Elevation: 1,076 ft (328 m)

Population (2020)
  - Total: 10,201
  - Density: 173.4/sq mi (66.94/km^{2})
- Time zone: UTC-5 (Eastern (EST))
  - Summer (DST): UTC-4 (EDT)
- FIPS code: 39-43190
- GNIS feature ID: 1086306

Liberty Township is one of the seventeen townships of Highland County, Ohio, United States. As of the 2020 census the population was 10,201.

== Geography ==
Located in the center of the county, it borders the following townships:

- Penn Township - north
- Paint Township - east
- Marshall Township - southeast
- Washington Township - south
- New Market Township - southwest
- Union Township - northwest

The city of Hillsboro, the county seat of Highland County, is located in Liberty Township.

== Name and history ==
It is one of twenty-five Liberty Townships statewide.

== Government ==
The township is governed by a three-member board of trustees, who are elected in November of odd-numbered years to a four-year term beginning on the following January 1. Two are elected in the year after the presidential election and one is elected in the year before it. There is also an elected township fiscal officer, who serves a four-year term beginning on April 1 of the year after the election, which is held in November of the year before the presidential election. Vacancies in the fiscal officership or on the board of trustees are filled by the remaining trustees.
