= Brushcreek Township, Ohio =

Township in Ohio, US

- Township
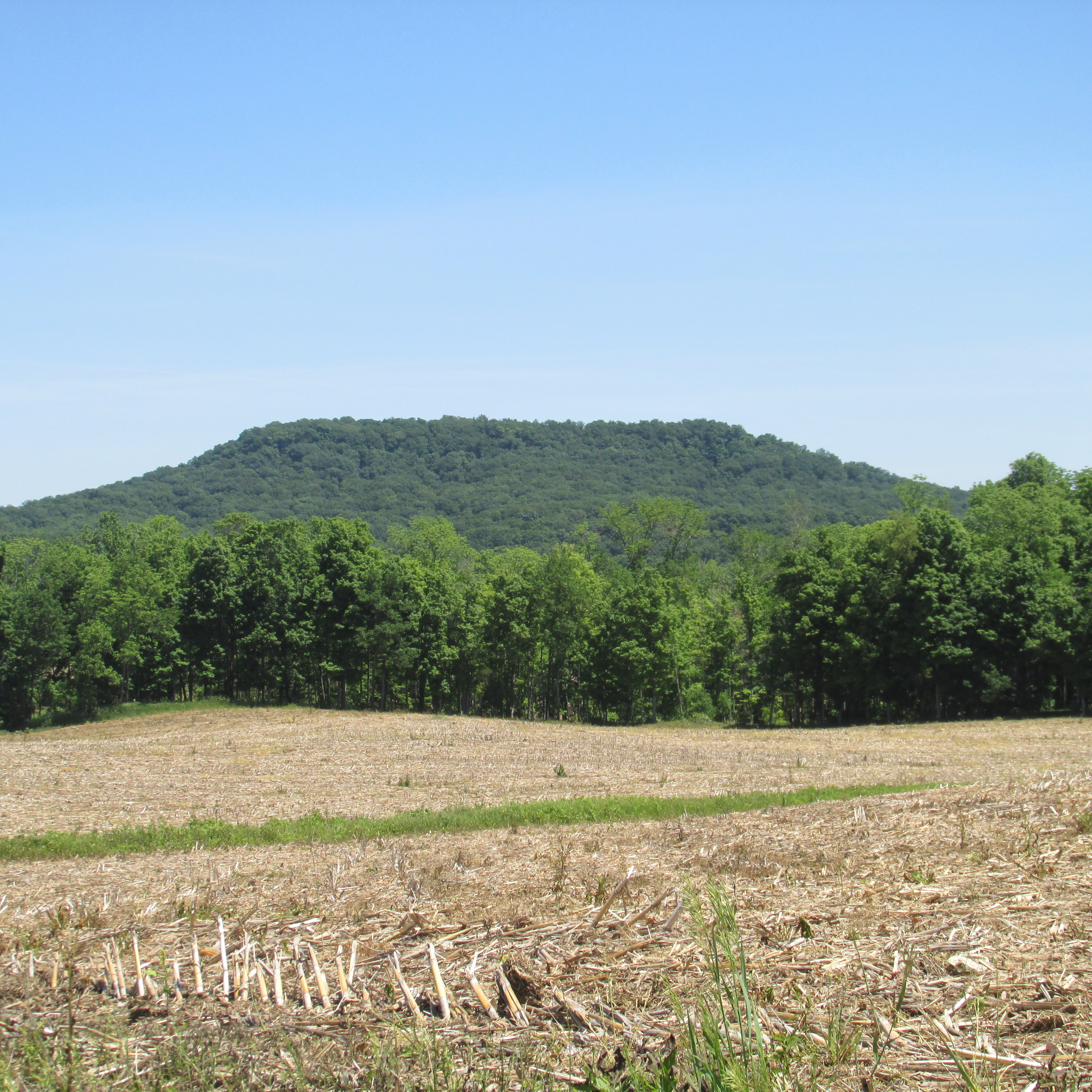
- Distant view of Fort Hill State Memorial

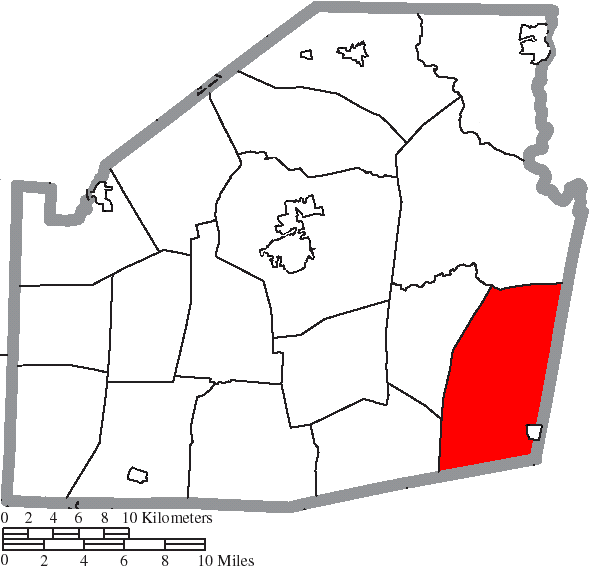
- Location of Brushcreek Township in Highland County
- Coordinates: 39°6′21″N 83°25′30″W
- Country: United States
- State: Ohio
- County: Highland

Area
  - Total: 43.4 sq mi (112.3 km^{2})
  - Land: 43.3 sq mi (112.1 km^{2})
  - Water: 0.039 sq mi (0.1 km^{2})
- Elevation: 873 ft (266 m)

Population (2020)
  - Total: 1,418
  - Density: 32.76/sq mi (12.65/km^{2})
- Time zone: UTC-5 (Eastern (EST))
  - Summer (DST): UTC-4 (EDT)
- FIPS code: 39-09736
- GNIS feature ID: 1086299

Brushcreek Township is one of the seventeen townships of Highland County, Ohio, United States. As of the 2020 census the population was 1,418.

== Geography ==
Located in the southeastern corner of the county, it borders the following townships:

- Paint Township – north
- Perry Township, Pike County – northeast
- Mifflin Township, Pike County – east
- Franklin Township, Adams County – southeast corner
- Bratton Township, Adams County – south
- Jackson Township – southwest
- Marshall Township – northwest

The village of Sinking Spring is located in southeastern Brushcreek Township. The unincorporated community of Carmel is also located in the township.

== Name and history ==
It is the only Brushcreek Township statewide, although Brush Creek Townships are located in Adams, Jefferson, Muskingum, and Scioto counties.

== Government ==
The township is governed by a three-member board of trustees, who are elected in November of odd-numbered years to a four-year term beginning on the following January 1. Two are elected in the year after the presidential election and one is elected in the year before it. There is also an elected township fiscal officer, who serves a four-year term beginning on April 1 of the year after the election, which is held in November of the year before the presidential election. Vacancies in the fiscal officership or on the board of trustees are filled by the remaining trustees.
