= East Danville, Ohio =

- Unincorporated community
- Location within Ohio Location within the United States
- Coordinates: 39°06′57″N 83°43′09″W
- Country: United States
- State: Ohio
- County: Highland
- Township: Hamer
- Elevation: 1,050 ft (320 m)
- Time zone: UTC-5 (Eastern (EST))
  - Summer (DST): UTC-4 (EDT)
- Area codes: 937, 326
- GNIS feature ID: 1064578

East Danville (also known as Winkle) is an unincorporated community in Highland County, Ohio, United States.

== History ==
The post office at East Danville was called Winkle. This post office was established in 1880, and remained in operation until 1969.

== Gallery ==
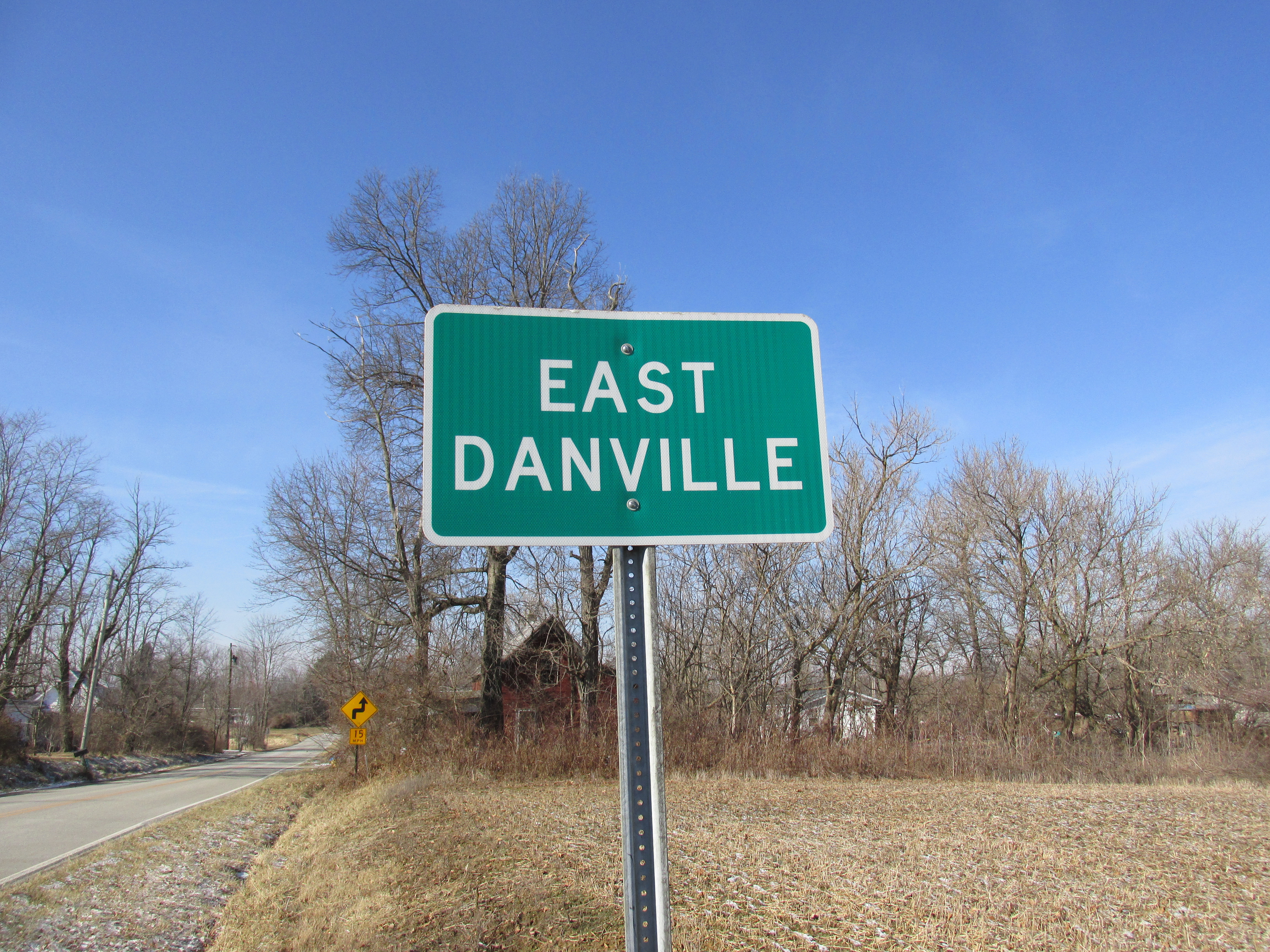
East Danville community sign

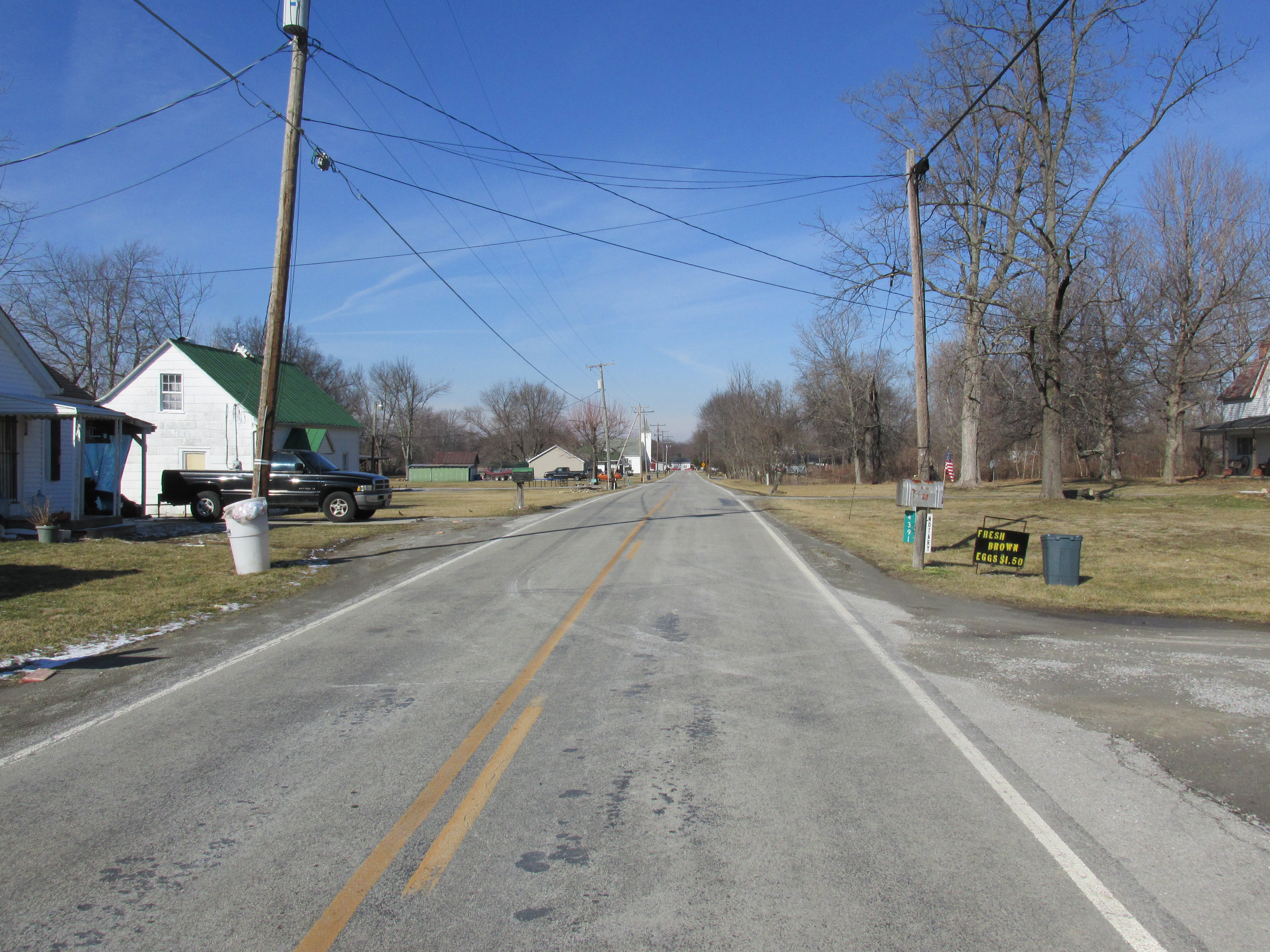
Looking northwest on Sorg Road in East Danville
