= New Market Township, Highland County, Ohio =

Township in Ohio, US

- Township
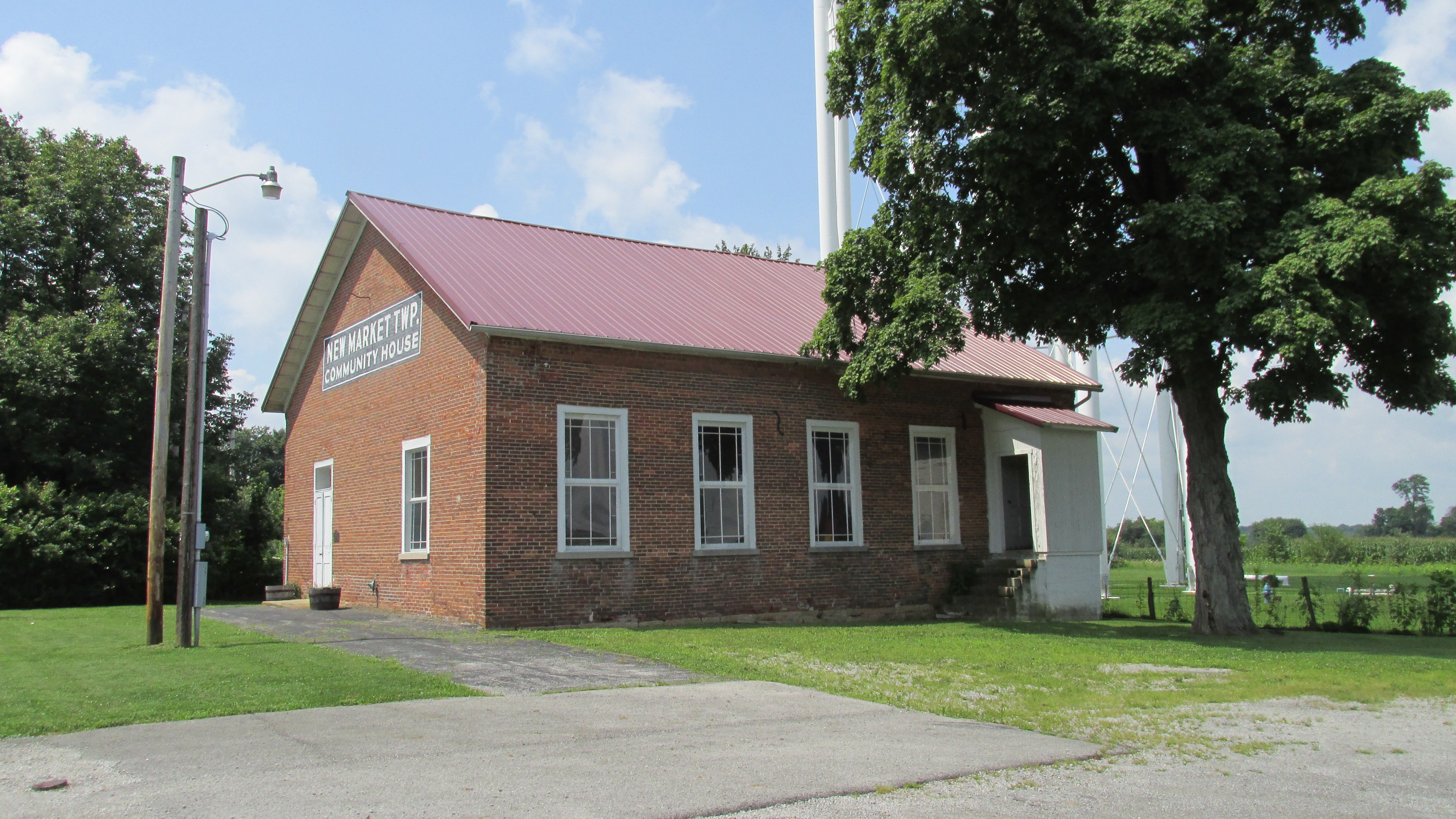
- Township community building

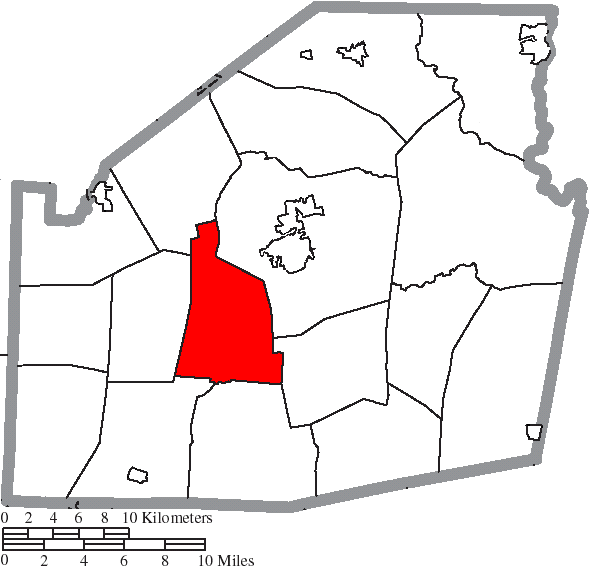
- Location of New Market Township in Highland County
- Coordinates: 39°9′24″N 83°40′17″W
- Country: United States
- State: Ohio
- County: Highland

Area
  - Total: 26.73 sq mi (69.24 km^{2})
  - Land: 26.72 sq mi (69.21 km^{2})
  - Water: 0.012 sq mi (0.03 km^{2})
- Elevation: 1,142 ft (348 m)

Population (2020)
  - Total: 1,874
  - Density: 70.13/sq mi (27.08/km^{2})
- Time zone: UTC-5 (Eastern (EST))
  - Summer (DST): UTC-4 (EDT)
- ZIP code: 45133
- Area codes: 937, 326
- FIPS code: 39-55048
- GNIS feature ID: 1086309

New Market Township is one of the seventeen townships of Highland County, Ohio, United States. As of the 2020 census the population was 1,874.

== Geography ==
Located in the central part of the county, it borders the following townships:

- Liberty Township - northeast
- Washington Township - southeast
- Concord Township - south
- Whiteoak Township - southwest
- Hamer Township - west
- Union Township - northwest

No municipalities are located in New Market Township.

== Name and history ==
It is the only New Market Township statewide.

== Government ==
The township is governed by a three-member board of trustees, who are elected in November of odd-numbered years to a four-year term beginning on the following January 1. Two are elected in the year after the presidential election and one is elected in the year before it. There is also an elected township fiscal officer, who serves a four-year term beginning on April 1 of the year after the election, which is held in November of the year before the presidential election. Vacancies in the fiscal officership or on the board of trustees are filled by the remaining trustees.
