= Bratton Township, Ohio =

Township in Ohio, US

- Township
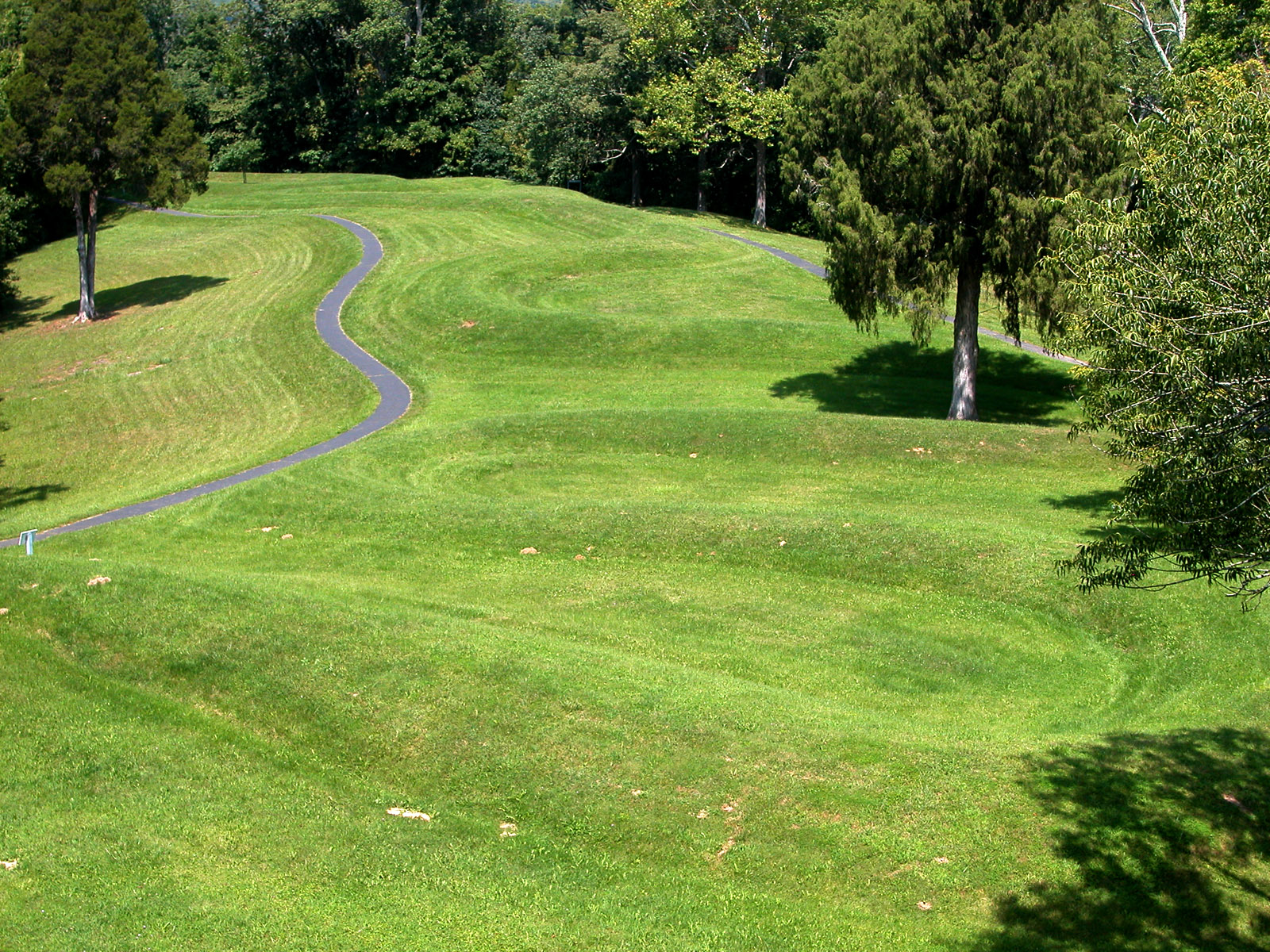
- Serpent Mound, located in the township

- Location in Adams County and the state of Ohio.
- Coordinates: 39°0′14″N 83°26′36″W
- Country: United States
- State: Ohio
- County: Adams
- Organized: 1877

Area
  - Total: 32.14 sq mi (83.23 km^{2})
  - Land: 32.12 sq mi (83.18 km^{2})
  - Water: 0.019 sq mi (0.05 km^{2})
- Elevation: 915 ft (279 m)

Population (2020)
  - Total: 1,380
  - Density: 46/sq mi (17.6/km^{2})
- Time zone: UTC-5 (Eastern (EST))
  - Summer (DST): UTC-4 (EDT)
- ZIP codes: 45660 (Peebles); 45679 (Seaman)
- Area code: 937
- FIPS code: 39-08350
- GNIS feature ID: 1085674

Bratton Township is one of the fifteen townships of Adams County, Ohio, United States. The population was 1,380 at the 2020 census.

The Great Serpent Mound, a serpent-shaped effigy mound of the Fort Ancient culture, is located within Bratton Township, along with much of the Serpent Mound crater.

== Geography ==
Located in the northern part of the county, it borders the following townships:

- Brushcreek Township, Highland County - north
- Mifflin Township, Pike County - northeast corner
- Franklin Township - east
- Meigs Township - south
- Scott Township - west
- Jackson Township, Highland County - northwest

No municipalities are located in Bratton Township.

== History ==
Bratton Township was organized in 1877. It is named for John Bratton, an early and prominent settler.

It is the only Bratton Township statewide.

== Government ==
The township is governed by a three-member board of trustees, who are elected in November of odd-numbered years to a four-year term beginning on the following January 1. Two are elected in the year after the presidential election and one is elected in the year before it. There is also an elected township fiscal officer, who serves a four-year term beginning on April 1 of the year after the election, which is held in November of the year before the presidential election. Vacancies in the fiscal officership or on the board of trustees are filled by the remaining trustees.
