= Penn Township, Morgan County, Ohio =

Township in Ohio, US

- Township
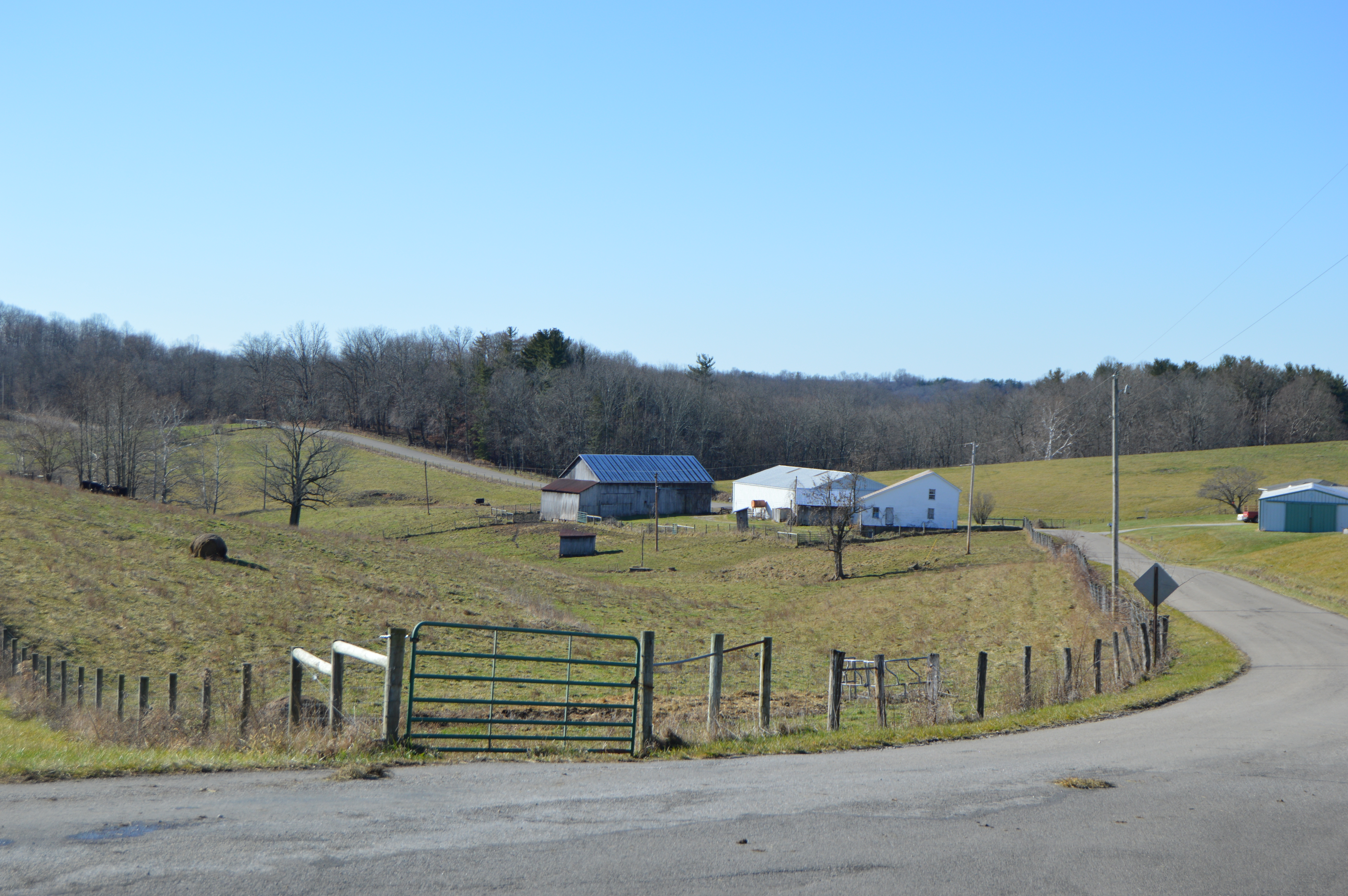
- Elliott Road in the township's northwestern corner

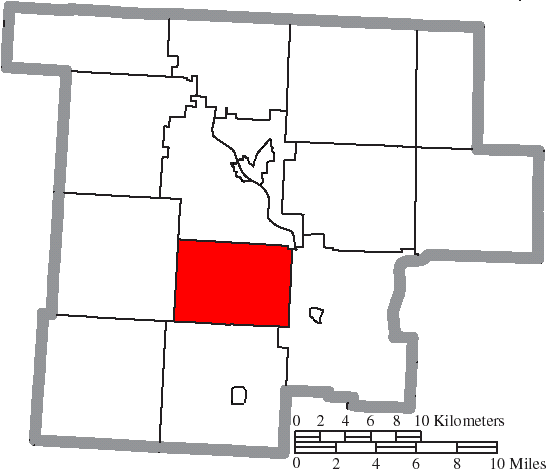
- Location of Penn Township in Morgan County
- Coordinates: 39°34′21″N 81°52′16″W
- Country: United States
- State: Ohio
- County: Morgan

Area
  - Total: 22.9 sq mi (59.4 km^{2})
  - Land: 22.9 sq mi (59.3 km^{2})
  - Water: 0.039 sq mi (0.1 km^{2})
- Elevation: 830 ft (253 m)

Population (2020)
  - Total: 656
  - Density: 28.7/sq mi (11.1/km^{2})
- Time zone: UTC-5 (Eastern (EST))
  - Summer (DST): UTC-4 (EDT)
- FIPS code: 39-61602
- GNIS feature ID: 1086693

Penn Township is one of the fourteen townships of Morgan County, Ohio, United States. The 2020 census found 656 people in the township.

== Geography ==
Located in the southern part of the county, it borders the following townships:

- Malta Township - north
- Windsor Township - east
- Marion Township - south
- Union Township - west

No municipalities are located in Penn Township.

== Name and history ==
Statewide, the only other Penn Township is located in Highland County.

== Government ==
The township is governed by a three-member board of trustees, who are elected in November of odd-numbered years to a four-year term beginning on the following January 1. Two are elected in the year after the presidential election and one is elected in the year before it. There is also an elected township fiscal officer, who serves a four-year term beginning on April 1 of the year after the election, which is held in November of the year before the presidential election. Vacancies in the fiscal officership or on the board of trustees are filled by the remaining trustees.
