= Penn Township, Highland County, Ohio =

Township in Ohio, US

- Township
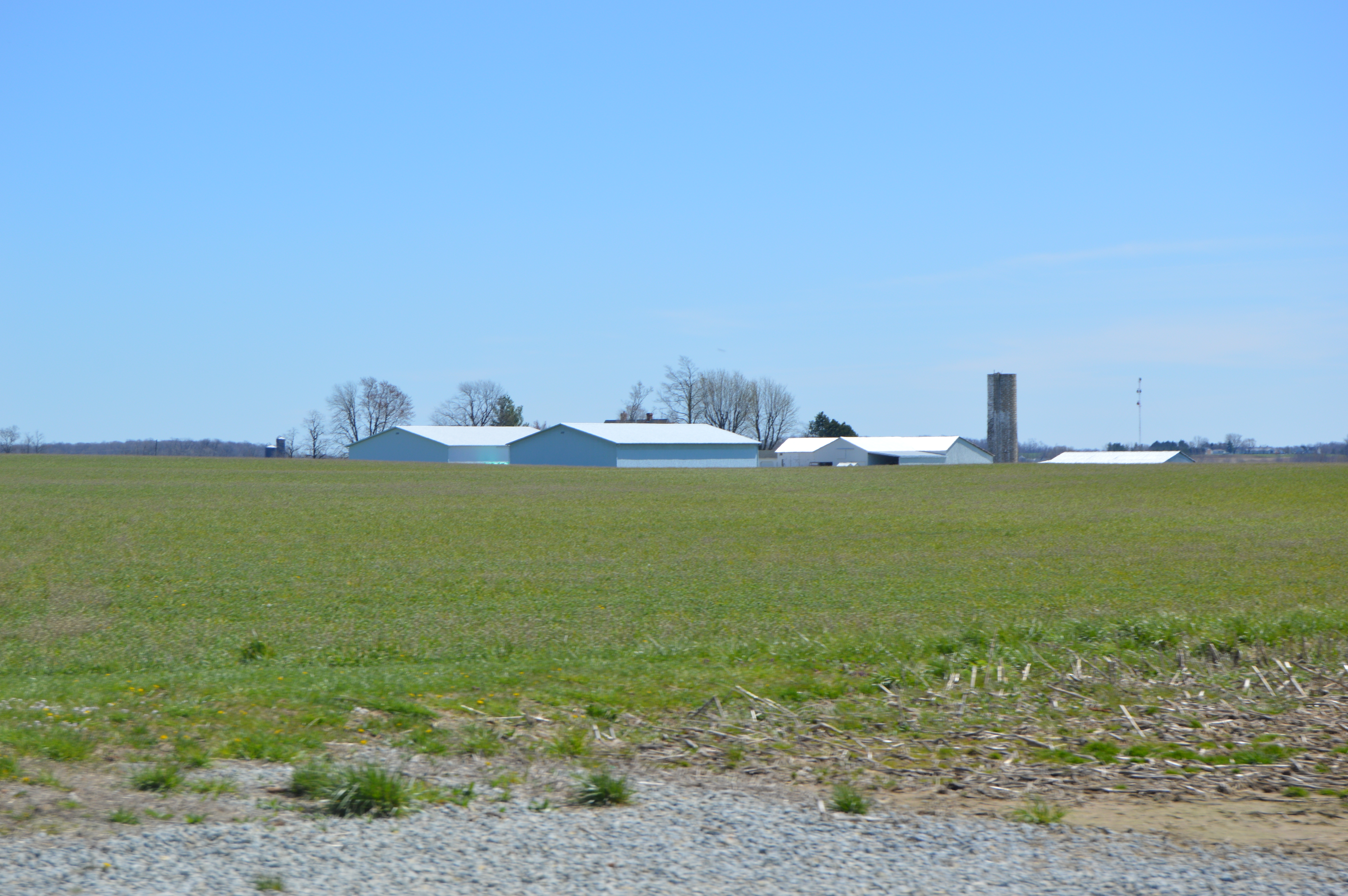
- Fields southwest of Leesburg

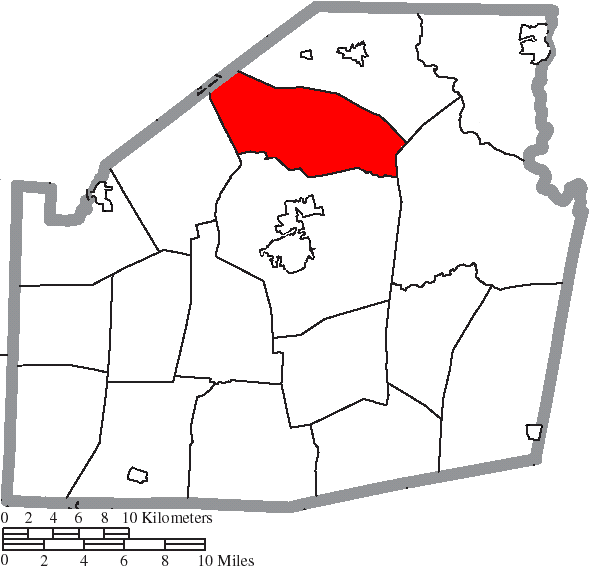
- Location of Penn Township in Highland County
- Coordinates: 39°17′49″N 83°35′16″W
- Country: United States
- State: Ohio
- County: Highland

Area
  - Total: 32.1 sq mi (83.1 km^{2})
  - Land: 32.1 sq mi (83.1 km^{2})
  - Water: 0 sq mi (0.0 km^{2})
- Elevation: 1,161 ft (354 m)

Population (2020)
  - Total: 1,542
  - Density: 48.1/sq mi (18.6/km^{2})
- Time zone: UTC-5 (Eastern (EST))
  - Summer (DST): UTC-4 (EDT)
- FIPS code: 39-61588
- GNIS feature ID: 1086311

Penn Township is one of the seventeen townships of Highland County, Ohio, United States. As of the 2020 census the population was 1,542.

== Geography ==
Located in the northern part of the county, it borders the following townships:

- Fairfield Township - northeast
- Paint Township - southeast
- Liberty Township - south
- Union Township - southwest
- Green Township, Clinton County - northwest

No municipalities are located in Penn Township.

== Name and history ==
Statewide, the only other Penn Township is located in Morgan County.

== Government ==
The township is governed by a three-member board of trustees, who are elected in November of odd-numbered years to a four-year term beginning on the following January 1. Two are elected in the year after the presidential election and one is elected in the year before it. There is also an elected township fiscal officer, who serves a four-year term beginning on April 1 of the year after the election, which is held in November of the year before the presidential election. Vacancies in the fiscal officership or on the board of trustees are filled by the remaining trustees.
