= USS Congress (1868) =

Sloop-of-war of the United States Navy

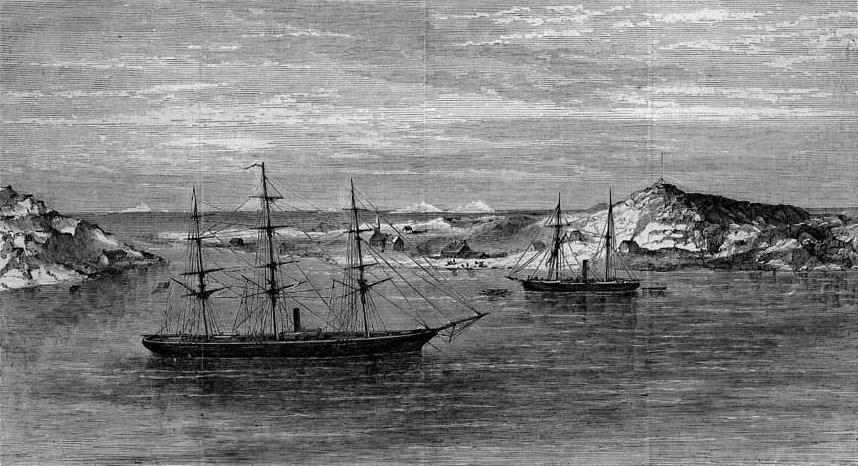
- USS Congress (left) and USS Polaris (right) moored off Disco Island in 1871

History

United States
- Name: Pushmataha (1869); Cambridge (1869); Congress (1869-1876)
- Builder: Philadelphia Navy Yard
- Laid down: 1864
- Launched: 17 July 1868
- Commissioned: 4 March 1870
- Decommissioned: 26 July 1876
- Stricken: c. 20 September 1883
- Fate: Destroyed by fire, 21 August 1885

General characteristics
- Class & type: Contoocook-class sloop
- Displacement: 3,003 short tons (2,681 long tons)
- Length: 290 feet (88 m)
- Beam: 41 feet (12 m)
- Depth: 15 feet 6 inches (4.72 m)
- Propulsion: 5 × boilers; 2 × expansion steam engines; 1 × screw
- Speed: 13 knots (24 km/h; 15 mph) maintained
- Complement: 350
- Armament: 14 × 9 in (23 cm) Dahlgren guns; 1 × 60 lb (27 kg) Parrott rifle

USS Congress was a Contoocook-class sloop of the United States Navy. She was laid down during the American Civil War to deter British intervention in 1864, although timber shortages and a rushed construction delayed progress. The sloop was initially planned to be named Pushmataha, but several changes to naming policies renamed her first to Cambridge and later Congress. Launched in 1868, her commissioning was delayed until 1870 in an attempt to season the wood.

Between 1870 and 1871, Congress served as the flagship of the South Atlantic Squadron. In 1871, she carried supplies to USS Polaris at Greenland in preparation for the Polaris expedition. Later that year, she served as the flagship during a visit by the Russian Navy to the US. Between 1872 and 1876, she made two tours with the Mediterranean Squadron and visited both Africa and Europe. She was decommissioned after a visit to the Centennial Exposition in 1876 and laid up. She was sold off in 1883 to be broken up and moored off New York alongside several other decommissioned ships. On 21 August 1885, a fire on an adjacent vessel broke out; Congress sank after catching fire and another ship's mast collapsed on top of her.

== Development ==
During the American Civil War, the Confederate States used British-built privateers to hamper Union trade; one such privateer, CSS Alabama, was responsible for destroying 65 merchant vessels. The disruption of Union trade routes drove up domestic prices, damaged the economy, and forced the reassignment of ships from blockade duties against the South. The United States feared that the United Kingdom would directly intervene to support the Confederacy—a scenario that would have left the Union Navy outmatched by the Royal Navy. In response, the Union Navy began planning for a possible war. While the American fleet could not match the British in conventional battles, the plan called for employing tactics similar to those used by the Confederacy: commerce raiding. By using cruisers to launch hit-and-run attacks on British ports and merchant shipping, the Union hoped to make a war too costly for Britain to justify, ultimately forcing it back into neutrality.

For the new role, the Navy developed "commerce destroyers" that had the range and speed to intercept enemy ships at sea. Twenty-seven such ships were ordered by Congress in 1863, split into three classes varying in size, speed, and armament. The smallest of these designs became known as the Contoocook-class sloop. By 1864, the new ships were built according to a new doctrine of the Navy for the post-war era. Congress was only interested in a Navy that could directly protect the United States, not one that could rival the Royal or French Navies. Instead of large, costly, ocean-going ironclads such as USS Dunderburg, the legislator wanted the Navy to only consist of coastal ironclads that would protect the shoreline and the commerce destroyers to operate out at sea and deter aggression from foreign nations.

== Design ==
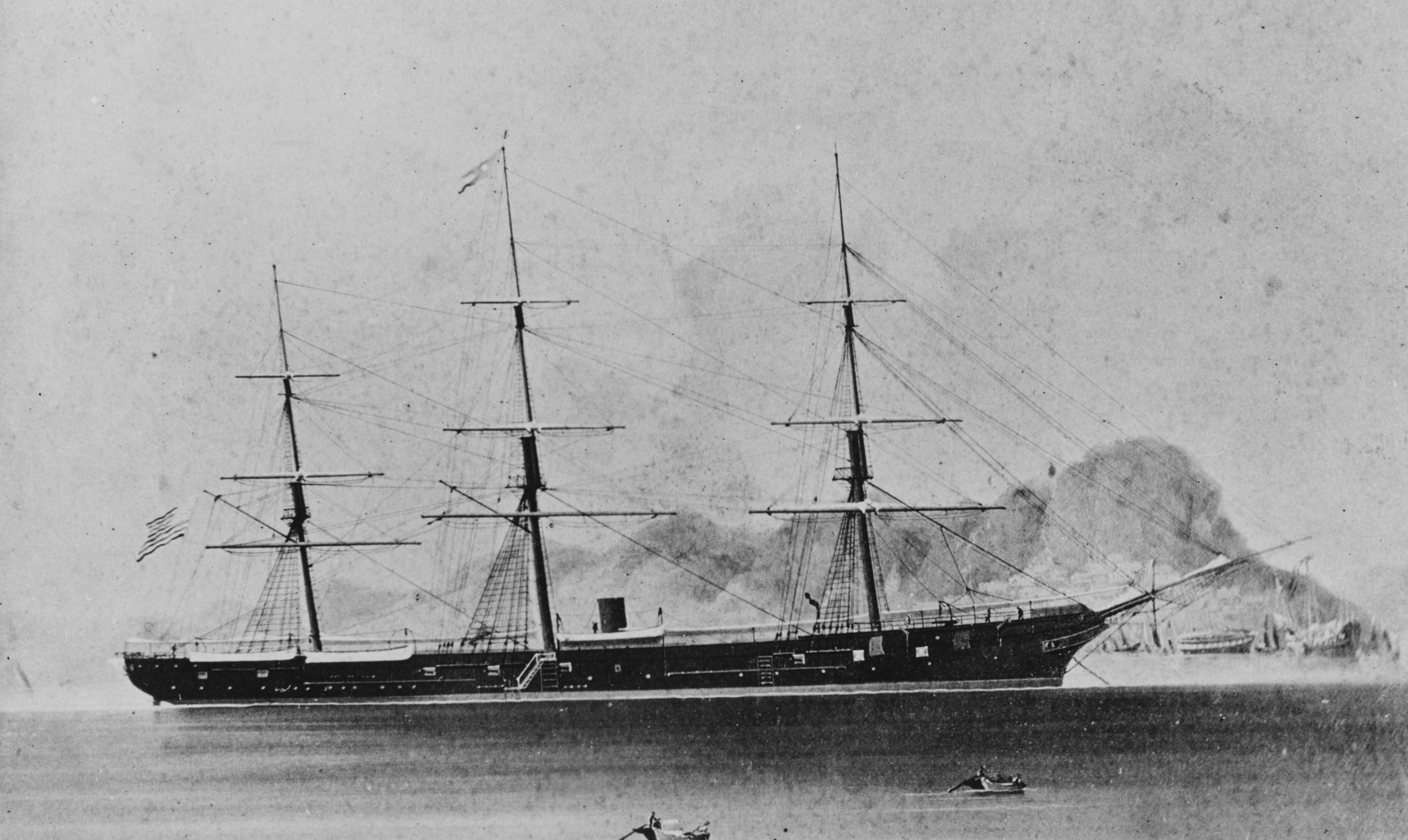
Congress's sister ship Severn, another Contoocook-class sloop

The Contoocook-class hulls were long, narrow, and shallow in an attempt to achieve high speeds. The class had a beam of 41 feet (12 m), depth of 15 feet 6 inches (4.72 m), a length along the waterline of 290 feet (88 m), had a displacement of 3,003 short tons (2,681 long tons), and a complement of 350. Congress was equipped with four main boilers and one superheating boiler, which provided steam to two horizontal back action steam 36 in (91 cm) stroke engines, which turned a single propeller. During sea trials, her captain claimed the ship could maintain 13 knots (24 km/h; 15 mph) with both her engines and ship-rigged sails. Armament consisted of a broadside of fourteen 9 in (23 cm) Dahlgren cannons and a 60 lb (27 kg) Parrott rifled muzzle-loading gun on the foredeck at her commissioning.

== Service history ==
In 1864, her keel was laid down at the Philadelphia Navy Yard, and she was launched on 17 July 1868. Like many other shipbuilding projects during the war, construction was rushed to get ships into service as soon as possible. A shortage of seasoned timber led to the class built out of heterogeneous green timber, which shortened the ships' service lives. As shortages continued after the war ended, ships were left half-built in the yards for years in an attempt to season the wood. Green, or undried, timber was undesirable as it had a tendency to rapidly shrink, rot, and leave a ship in need of uneconomic repair.

While the sloop was initially named Pushmataha, Secretary of the Navy Adolph Borie disapproved of warships with Native American-sounding names and the unclear conventions used across the fleet. As a result, he ordered a systematic renaming of vessels. The ship was renamed Cambridge on 15 May 1869. When Borie left office after three months, his predecessor reversed many of the changes and continued to rename vessels. On 10 August 1869, the sloop was renamed Congress. That year, a post-war audit inspected her sister ship Severn; the design was criticized as being too narrow and having an unnecessary amount of machinery. While a spar deck was added and the rigging altered on each ship, neither issue was ultimately addressed. The addition of the spar deck allowed an additional six cannons added to the broadside, as the design was initially only to feature nine.

She was finally commissioned on 4 March 1870, and her first assignment was to serve as the flagship of the South Atlantic Squadron. Congress operated with the squadron for a year before arriving in Boston in May 1871. During the summer, she carried supplies to USS Polaris at Disco Island in preparation for the Polaris expedition. Back in the United States, the sloop served as the flagship of Stephen Rowan for formalities during a Russian squadron's visit. In early 1872, she briefly visited Haiti before leaving Norfolk, Virginia, in February to join the Mediterranean Squadron. She visited many European ports during the tour, and briefly returned to the US in early 1874. She returned to the Mediterranean in April for a second tour throughout Northern Africa and Southern Europe before arriving in Philadelphia for the Centennial Exposition in 1876. On 26 July, she was decommissioned at Portsmouth, New Hampshire. The sloop was laid up until she was sold on 20 September 1883.

Her new owners were Stannard & Co, a firm that bought old ships to dismantle for old iron and planks. In 1885, Congress was moored off Plumb Beach, New York reportedly (Note: Initial reporting claimed USS Minnesota was among the ships affected, and that her mast is the one which crashed onto Congress. Later coverage clarified that Minnesota was moored elsewhere in the city and unaffected. The former USS South Carolina was also claimed to have been affected, although by 1885 she was a merchant ship named Juniata.) alongside the former warships Colorado, Susquehanna, Iowa, and civilian schooners Lotta Grant and Fairplay. On the evening of 21 August 1885, workmen onboard Colorado were burning boards in an attempt to remove nails when the fire got out of control. The flames quickly spread, glowing bright enough to attract onlookers from shore and hot enough to prevent crews from approaching. Each ship was engulfed in flames, and as Colorado sank, a burning mast from another ship collapsed onto Congress and both hulls sank together. Within three hours, all seven ships were sunk. Each hull was burned to the waterline and rested near each other on the seabed. Soon after the incident, an official from Stannard & Co stated the fire cost the company more than $100,000 and that the wrecks would be salvaged.

== Sources ==
=== Print ===
- Canney, Donald L. (1990). The Old Steam Navy Volume 1: Frigates, Sloops and Gunboats, 1815–1885. Naval Institute Press. ISBN 978-0870210044.
- Caiella, J.M. (April 2016). "The Wampanoag: 'Germ Idea' of the Battlecruiser". Naval History. 30 (2). ISSN 1042-1920.
- Campbell, N. J. M. (1979). "United States". In Chesneau, Roger; Kolesnik, Eugene M. (eds.). Conway's All the World's Fighting Ships, 1860–1905. New York City: Mayflower Books. pp. 114–169. ISBN 978-0-8317-0302-8.
- Kinnaman, Stephen Chapin (2022). John Lenthall: The Life of a Naval Constructor. Vernon Press. ISBN 978-1-64889-437-4.
- Official Records of the Union and Confederate Navies in the War of the Rebellion. United States Naval War Records. U.S. Government Printing Office. 1921.
- LaGrone, Sam (3 June 2025). "SECNAV Tasked to Rename USNS Harvey Milk; Report Says Other Ship Renamings Under Consideration". USNI News.
- Sloan, III, Edward W. (1965). "Isherwood's Masterpiece". Proceedings of the United States Naval Institute. 91 (12).
- Small, Stephen C. (August 2002). "The Wampanoag Goes on Trial". Naval History. 16 (4). United States Naval Institute. ISSN 1042-1920.
- "Old Government Ships Burned" (PDF). The New York Times. New York, New York. 22 August 1885.
- "War Vessels Burned". The Critic and Record. 22 August 1885. p. 1.

=== Online ===
- "Congress V". www.history.navy.mil. Dictionary of American Fighting Ships.
- "Pushmataha". www.history.navy.mil. Dictionary of American Fighting Ships.
- "South Carolina III (Scr Slp)". www.history.navy.mil. Dictionary of American Fighting Ships.
- Quarstein, John V. (2021-08-21). "Roll, Alabama, Roll! - Sinking of CSS Alabama". Mariners' Museum and Park. Archived from the original on June 23, 2024.
- "Supplying Warships · Liverpool's Abercromby Square and the Confederacy During the U.S. Civil War ·". ldhi.library.cofc.edu. Lowcountry Digital History Initiative. Archived from the original on July 19, 2024.
- "The Evolution of Ship Naming in the U.S. Navy". Naval History and Heritage Command. Archived from the original on 10 Feb 2025.
