= USS Contoocook (1864) =

Steam sloop of the US Navy

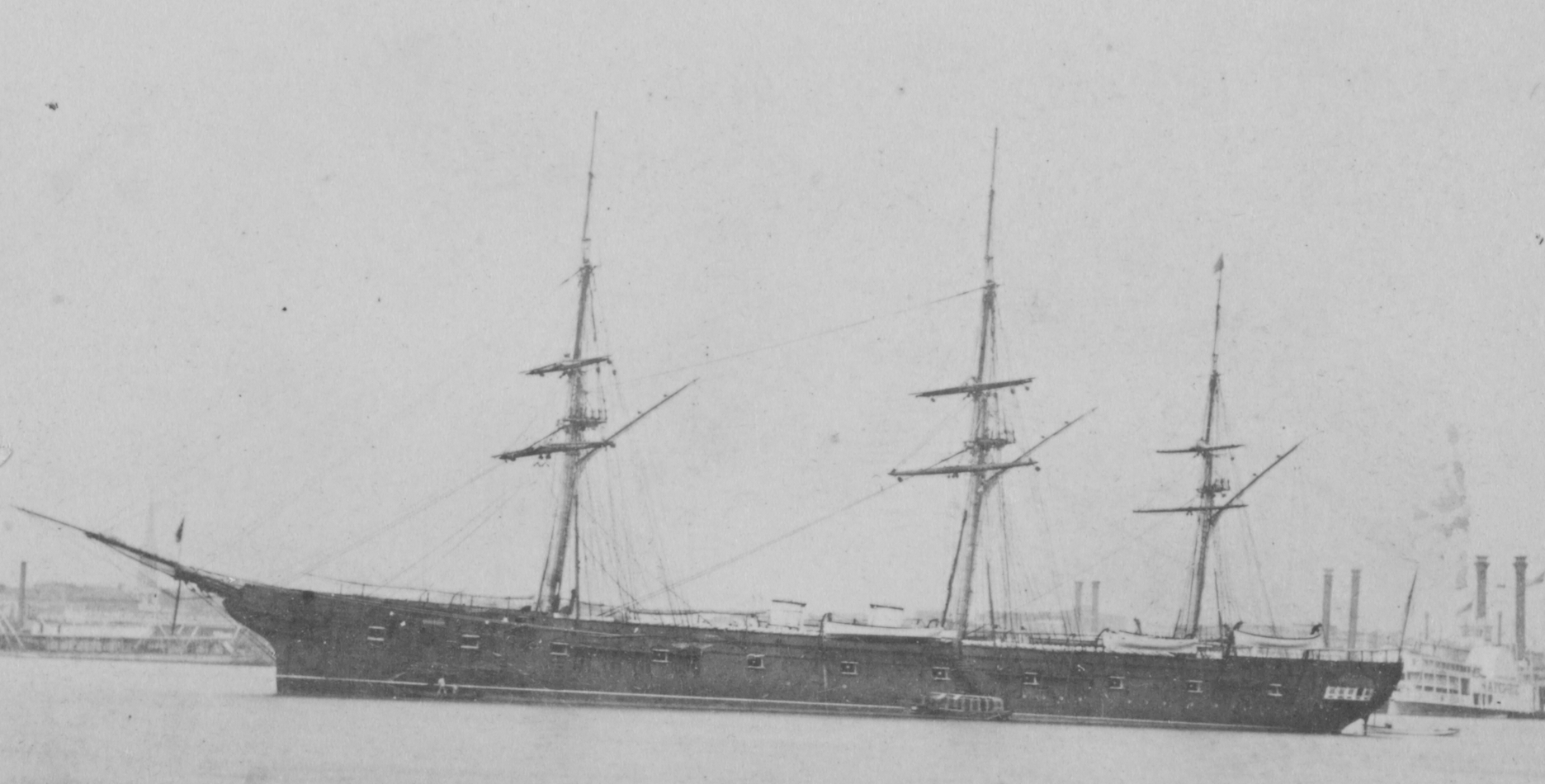
- USS Worcester, one of Contoocook's sister ships, in 1875 after she was converted into a frigate

History

United States
- Name: Contoocook (1864-1869); Albany (1869-1870)
- Builder: New York Navy Yard
- Laid down: 1863
- Launched: 3 December 1864
- Commissioned: 14 March 1868
- Decommissioned: 7 January 1870
- Fate: Sold off, 12 December 1872

General characteristics
- Class & type: Contoocook-class frigate
- Displacement: 3,003 short tons (2,681 long tons)
- Length: 290 feet (88 m)
- Beam: 41 feet (12 m)
- Depth: 15 feet 6 inches (4.72 m)
- Propulsion: 6 × boilers; 2 × expansion steam engine; 1 × screw
- Speed: 12 knots (22 km/h; 14 mph)
- Complement: 350
- Armament: 14 × 9 in (23 cm) Dahlgren guns; 1 × 60 lb (27 kg) Parrott rifle

USS Contoocook was the lead Contoocook-class sloop of the United States Navy. She was laid down during the American Civil War to deter British intervention in 1864, although timber shortages and a rushed construction delayed progress. Launched in 1864 and commissioned in 1868, her design was criticized and green wood limited her service life. While built as a sloop, modifications in 1869 enlarged her armament and converted her into a frigate. That year, she was renamed Albany as part of a new Navy-wide naming standard. She performed two sailings to the East Indies between 1868 and 1869 as part of a mission to protect American interests. In 1870, she was decommissioned and used as a quarantine ship in New York City. Redundant after new quarantine sites were finished, she was sold off in late 1872.

== Development ==
During the American Civil War, the Confederate States used British-built privateers to hamper Union trade; one such privateer, CSS Alabama, was responsible for destroying 65 merchant vessels. The disruption of Union trade routes drove up domestic prices, damaged the economy, and forced the reassignment of ships from blockade duties against the South. The United States feared that the United Kingdom would directly intervene to support the Confederacy—a scenario that would have left the Union Navy outmatched by the Royal Navy. In response, the Union Navy began planning for a possible war. While the American fleet could not match the British in conventional battles, the plan called for employing tactics similar to those used by the Confederacy: commerce raiding. By using cruisers to launch hit-and-run attacks on British ports and merchant shipping, the Union hoped to make a war too costly for Britain to justify, ultimately forcing it back into neutrality.

For the new role, the Navy developed "commerce destroyers" that had the range and speed to intercept enemy ships at sea. Twenty-seven such ships were ordered by Congress in 1863, split into three classes varying in size, speed, and armament. The smallest of these designs became known as the Contoocook-class sloop. By 1864, the new ships were built according to a new doctrine of the Navy for the post-war era. Congress was only interested in a Navy that could directly protect the United States, not one that could rival the Royal or French Navies. Instead of large, costly, ocean-going ironclads such as USS Dunderburg, the legislature wanted the Navy to only consist of coastal ironclads that would protect the shoreline and the commerce destroyers to operate out at sea and deter aggression from foreign nations.

== Design ==
The Contoocook-class hulls were long, narrow, and shallow in an attempt to achieve high speeds. The class had a beam of 41 feet (12 m), depth of 15 feet 6 inches (4.72 m), a length along the waterline of 290 feet (88 m), had a displacement of 3,003 short tons (2,681 long tons), and a complement of 350. Contoocook was equipped with four main boilers and two superheating boilers, which provided steam to two horizontal back action steam 36 in (91 cm) stroke engines, which turned a single propeller. The ship was considered a sloop by the US Navy and a corvette by foreign standards. Her armament consisted of a broadside of eight 9 in (23 cm) Dahlgren cannons and a 60 lb (27 kg) Parrott rifled muzzle-loading gun on the foredeck at her commissioning. During her sea trials, Contoocook reached a speed of 12 knots (22 km/h; 14 mph) before breaking down and was praised for her stability.

== Service history ==
In 1863, her keel was laid down at the Portsmouth Navy Yard, and she was launched on 3 December 1864. Like many other shipbuilding projects during the war, construction was rushed to get ships into service as soon as possible. A shortage of seasoned timber led to the class built out of heterogeneous green timber, which shortened the ships' service lives. As shortages continued after the war ended in 1865, ships were left half-built in the yards for years in an attempt to season the wood. Green, or undried, timber was undesirable as it had a tendency to shrink, rot, and leave a ship in need of uneconomic repair.

She was finally commissioned on 14 March 1868, and her first assignment was to serve as the flagship of the North Atlantic Squadron. Throughout 1868 and 1869, she patrolled the West Indies to protect American interests. The sloop was initially named Contoocook, after the river and town in New Hampshire. However, Adolph Borie, the Secretary of the Navy, disapproved of warships with Native American-sounding names and the unclear conventions used across the fleet. As a result, he ordered a systematic renaming of vessels. The ship was renamed Albany, after Albany, New York, on 15 May 1869. That year, a post-war audit inspected USS Severn; the Contoocook-class design was criticized as being too narrow and having an unnecessary amount of machinery. While a spar deck was added and the rigging altered on each ship, neither issue was ultimately addressed. The addition of the deck allowed an additional six Dahlgren cannons added to the broadside. After the modifications, Albany was considered a frigate by the Navy.

She again operated in the West Indies later that year, and was decommissioned on 7 January 1870. Back in the United States, the vessel was used as a quarantine ship in New York. After a mob burned down the New York Marine Hospital in 1858, ships in New York Bay were used as an interim replacement. She was sold off 12 December 1872, after dedicated quarantine facilities on Swinburne and Hoffman Island opened.

== Sources ==
=== Print ===
- Canney, Donald L. (1990). The Old Steam Navy Volume 1: Frigates, Sloops and Gunboats, 1815–1885. Naval Institute Press. ISBN 978-0870210044.
- Caiella, J.M. (April 2016). "The Wampanoag: 'Germ Idea' of the Battlecruiser". Naval History. 30 (2). ISSN 1042-1920.
- Campbell, N. J. M. (1979). "United States". In Chesneau, Roger; Kolesnik, Eugene M. (eds.). Conway's All the World's Fighting Ships, 1860–1905. New York City: Mayflower Books. pp. 114–169. ISBN 978-0-8317-0302-8.
- Kinnaman, Stephen Chapin (2022). John Lenthall: The Life of a Naval Constructor. Vernon Press. ISBN 978-1-64889-437-4.
- Official Records of the Union and Confederate Navies in the War of the Rebellion. United States Naval War Records. II. Vol. 1. U.S. Government Printing Office. 1921.
- LaGrone, Sam (3 June 2025). "SECNAV Tasked to Rename USNS Harvey Milk; Report Says Other Ship Renamings Under Consideration". USNI News.
- Sloan, III, Edward W. (1965). "Isherwood's Masterpiece". Proceedings of the United States Naval Institute. 91 (12).
- Small, Stephen C. (August 2002). "The Wampanoag Goes on Trial". Naval History. 16 (4). United States Naval Institute. ISSN 1042-1920.

=== Online ===
- "Albany II (Screw Sloop of War)". www.history.navy.mil. Dictionary of American Naval Fighting Ships. 4 November 2015.
- "Contoocook". www.history.navy.mil. Dictionary of American Naval Fighting Ships. 4 November 2015.
- French, Mary (31 July 2018). "Quarantine Cemeteries". New York City Cemetery Project.
- Quarstein, John V. (2021-08-21). "Roll, Alabama, Roll! - Sinking of CSS Alabama". Mariners' Museum and Park. Archived from the original on June 23, 2024.
- "Supplying Warships · Liverpool's Abercromby Square and the Confederacy During the U.S. Civil War ·". ldhi.library.cofc.edu. Lowcountry Digital History Initiative. Archived from the original on July 19, 2024.
- "The Evolution of Ship Naming in the U.S. Navy". Naval History and Heritage Command. Archived from the original on 10 Feb 2025.
- "The History of Quarantine in New York Harbor and Long Island". The Whaling Museum.
