= USS Worcester (1866) =

Contoocook-class frigate

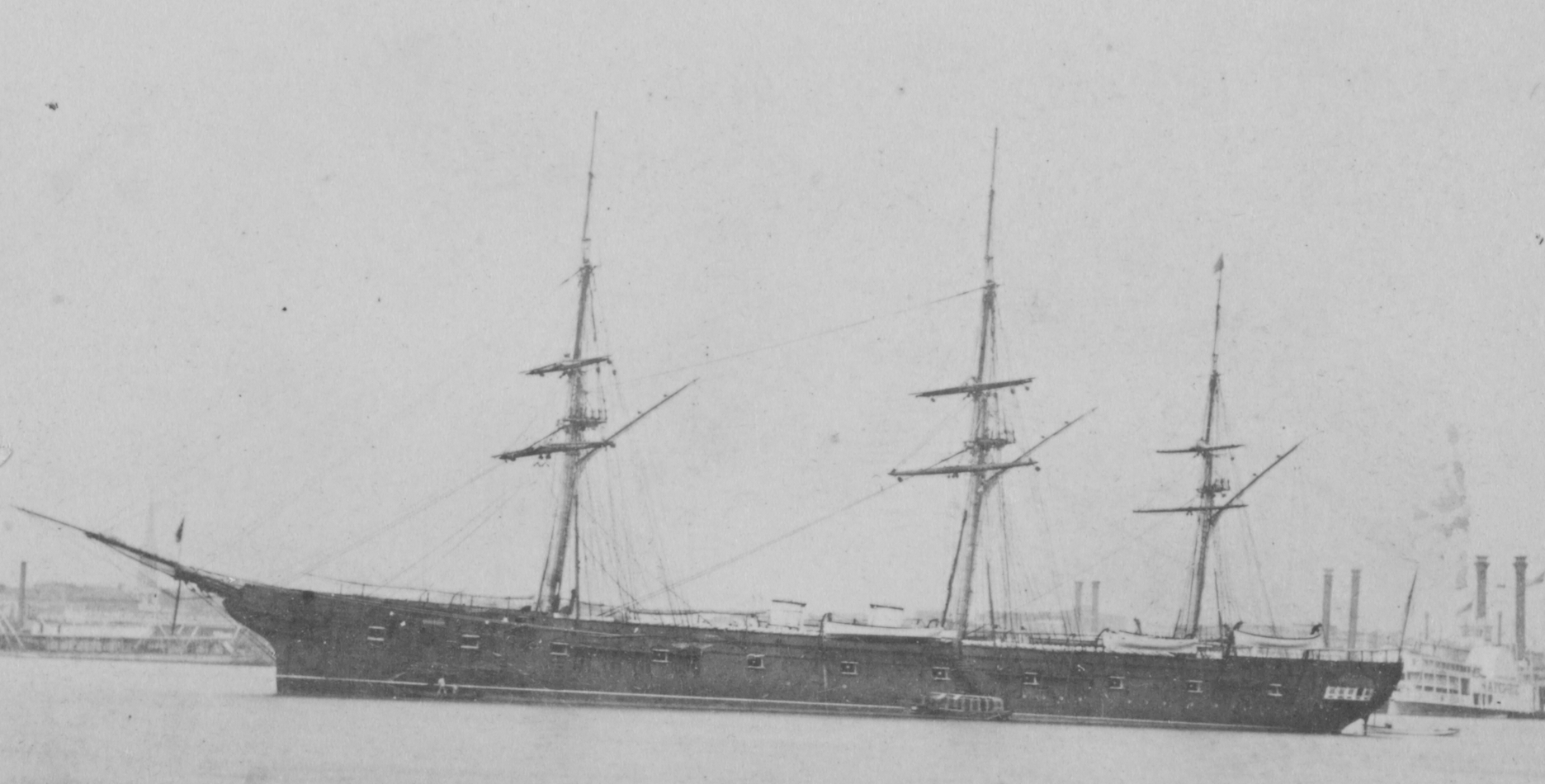
- Abeam view of USS Worcester in 1875

History

United States
- Name: Manitou (1863-1869); Worcester (1869-1876)
- Builder: Boston Navy Yard
- Laid down: October 1863
- Launched: August 25, 1866
- Commissioned: February 27, 1871
- Decommissioned: 1876
- Fate: Sold off, 1883

General characteristics
- Class & type: Contoocook-class sloop
- Displacement: 3,003 short tons (2,681 long tons)
- Length: 290 feet (88 m)
- Beam: 41 feet (12 m)
- Depth: 15 feet 6 inches (4.72 m)
- Propulsion: 5 × boilers; 2 × expansion steam engines; 1 × screw
- Complement: 350
- Armament: 14 × 9 in (23 cm) Dahlgren guns; 1 × 60 lb (27 kg) Parrott rifle

USS Worcester was a Contoocook-class frigate of the United States Navy. She was laid down as Manitou during the American Civil War to deter British intervention in 1864, although timber shortages and a rushed construction delayed progress. Her first name, after a Native American term, was replaced by the more Anglo-sounding one as part of a new naming system. Renamed and launched in 1869, her design was criticized and unseasoned wood limited her service life. While intended as a sloop, modifications while under construction enlarged her armament and converted her into a frigate. She was rushed into service to carry humanitarian aid to France during the Franco-Prussian War, although most of the food did not reach where it was needed most. After the voyage, she served as the flagship of the North Atlantic Squadron between 1872 and 1875 before she was decommissioned the next year. By 1881, she was reduced to a hulk and condemned due to a rotted hull and sold off in 1883.

== Development ==
During the American Civil War, the Confederate States used British-built privateers to hamper Union trade instead of directly challenging the Union Navy. One such privateer, CSS Alabama, was responsible for destroying 65 merchant vessels. The disruption of Union trade routes drove up domestic prices, damaged the economy, and forced the reassignment of ships from blockade duties against the South. The United States feared that the United Kingdom would directly intervene to support the Confederacy—a scenario that would have left the Union Navy outmatched by the Royal Navy. In response, the Union Navy began planning for a possible war. While the American fleet could not match the British in conventional battles, the plan called for employing tactics similar to those used by the Confederacy: commerce raiding. By using cruisers to launch hit-and-run attacks on British ports and merchant shipping, the Union hoped to make a war too costly for Britain to justify, ultimately forcing it back into neutrality.

For the new role, the Navy developed "commerce destroyers" that had the range and speed to intercept enemy ships at sea. Twenty-seven such ships were ordered by Congress in 1863, split into three classes varying in size, speed, and armament. The smallest of these designs became known as the Contoocook-class sloop. By 1864, the new ships were built according to a new doctrine of the Navy for the post-war era. Congress was only interested in a Navy that could directly protect the United States, not one that could rival the Royal or French Navies. Instead of large, costly, ocean-going ironclads such as USS Dunderburg, the legislator wanted the Navy to only consist of coastal ironclads that would protect the shoreline and the commerce destroyers to operate out at sea and deter aggression from foreign nations.

== Design ==
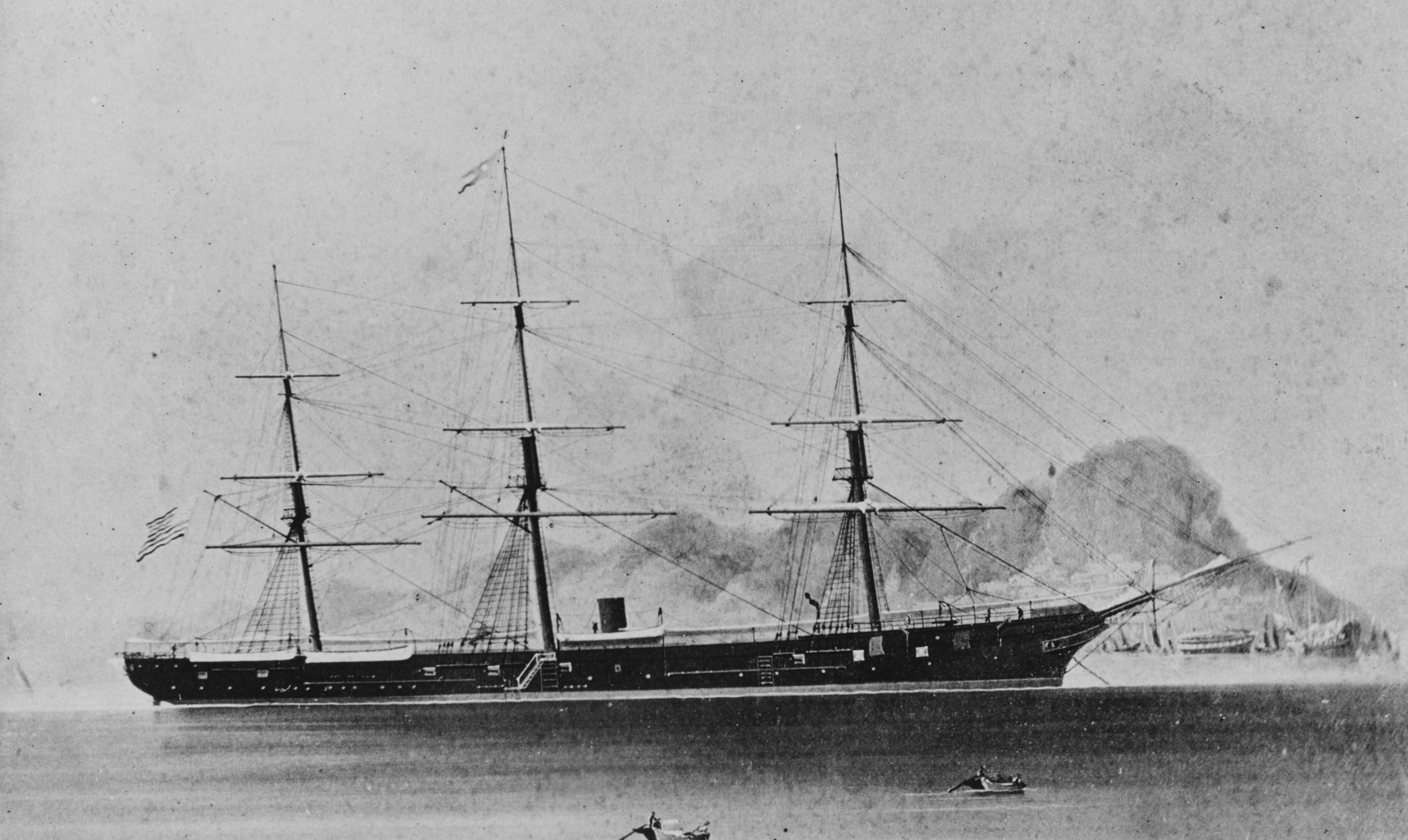
Worcester's sister ship Severn, another Contoocook-class frigate

The Contoocook-class hulls were long, shallow, and narrow in an attempt to achieve high speeds. The class had a beam of 41 feet (12 m), depth of 15 feet 6 inches (4.72 m), a length along the waterline of 290 feet (88 m), had a displacement of 3,003 short tons (2,681 long tons), and a complement of 350. Worcester was equipped with four main boilers and two superheating boilers, which provided steam to two horizontal back action steam engines, which turned a single propeller. Combined with ship-rigged sails, she could reach a speed of about 13 knots (24 km/h; 15 mph). Armament consisted of a broadside of fourteen 9 in (23 cm) Dahlgren cannons and a 60 lb (27 kg) Parrott rifle on the foredeck when she was commissioned.

== Service history ==
In October 1863, her keel was laid down at the Boston Navy Yard, and she was launched on August 25, 1866. Like many other shipbuilding projects during the war, construction was rushed to get ships into service as soon as possible. A shortage of seasoned timber led to the class built out of unseasoned white oak, which shortened the ships' service lives. As shortages continued after the war ended, the ships were left half-built in the yards for years in an attempt to season the wood. Unseasoned, or undried, timber was undesirable as it had a tendency to rapidly shrink, rot, and leave a ship in need of uneconomic repair.

The ship was named Manitou on November 5, 1863, after the Algonquian term for spirit. However, Adolph Borie, the Secretary of the Navy, disapproved of warships with Native American-sounding names and the unclear conventions used across the fleet. As a result, he ordered a systematic renaming of vessels. The ship was renamed Worcester on May 15, 1869, after Worcester, Massachusetts. That year, a post-war audit inspected USS Severn; the Contoocook-class design was criticized as being too narrow and having an unnecessary amount of machinery. While a spar deck was added and the rigging altered on each ship, neither issue was ultimately addressed. The addition of the spar deck allowed an additional six cannons added to the broadside, as the design was initially only to feature nine. After the modifications, the ship was considered a frigate by the Navy.

She was finally commissioned on February 27, 1871, and rushed into service. Instead of sea trials, the ship was ordered to carry food to France during the Franco-Prussian War. Several groups had raised money for humanitarian supplies throughout the US, and Congress ordered the Navy to transport the items. Worcester was loaded with 10,000 barrels of food and ordered to sail to France along with USS Supply. She left Boston on March 5, 1871, and soon encountered poor weather. Three days into the maiden voyage, a boiler bust, which fatally scalded four crewmembers and injured six; a later investigation blamed the incident on defective tubing. Progress was slow, and she arrived at Plymouth, England on April 4. The plan to distribute the aid had fallen through, and the cargo was instead unloaded at London. The US had overestimated the need for aid, and while some it reached the French coast, most of the material was never transported inland to where it was needed.

Worcester returned to Boston, and operated as flagship of the North Atlantic Squadron between 1872 and 1875. In 1876, she was decommissioned and laid up at the Norfolk Navy Yard the next year. The ship was then used as a receiving ship until 1881. That year, she was found "unfit for repair" due to a rotted hull and sold off in 1883. The Dictionary of American Naval Fighting Ships speculates she was broken up soon after.

== Sources ==
=== Print ===
- Canney, Donald L. (1990). The Old Steam Navy Volume 1: Frigates, Sloops and Gunboats, 1815–1885. Naval Institute Press. ISBN 978-0870210044.
- Caiella, J.M. (April 2016). "The Wampanoag: 'Germ Idea' of the Battlecruiser". Naval History. 30 (2). ISSN 1042-1920.
- Campbell, N. J. M. (1979). "United States". In Chesneau, Roger; Kolesnik, Eugene M. (eds.). Conway's All the World's Fighting Ships, 1860–1905. New York City: Mayflower Books. pp. 114–169. ISBN 978-0-8317-0302-8.
- Kinnaman, Stephen Chapin (2022). John Lenthall: The Life of a Naval Constructor. Vernon Press. ISBN 978-1-64889-437-4.
- LaGrone, Sam (June 3, 2025). "SECNAV Tasked to Rename USNS Harvey Milk; Report Says Other Ship Renamings Under Consideration". USNI News.
- "Miscellaneous War News". The New York Times. February 15, 1871. ISSN 0362-4331.
- Sloan, III, Edward W. (1965). "Isherwood's Masterpiece". Proceedings of the United States Naval Institute. 91 (12).
- Small, Stephen C. (August 2002). "The Wampanoag Goes on Trial". Naval History. 16 (4). United States Naval Institute. ISSN 1042-1920.
- "The Boston Cargo of Food Nearly Ready". The New York Times. February 14, 1871. ISSN 0362-4331.

=== Online ===
- "Manitou". Naval History and Heritage Command. Dictionary of American Naval Fighting Ships. August 5, 2015.
- Quarstein, John V. (August 21, 2021). "Roll, Alabama, Roll! - Sinking of CSS Alabama". Mariners' Museum and Park. Archived from the original on June 23, 2024.
- "Supplying Warships · Liverpool's Abercromby Square and the Confederacy During the U.S. Civil War ·". ldhi.library.cofc.edu. Lowcountry Digital History Initiative. Archived from the original on July 19, 2024.
- "The Evolution of Ship Naming in the U.S. Navy". Naval History and Heritage Command. Archived from the original on February 10, 2025.
- "Worcester I (Sloop-of-War)". Naval History and Heritage Command. Dictionary of American Naval Fighting Ships. November 4, 2015.
