= List of shipwrecks in March 1871 =

The list of shipwrecks in March 1871 includes ships sunk, foundered, grounded, or otherwise lost during March 1871.

== 1 March ==
List of shipwrecks: 1 March 1871
Ship	State	Description
Geraint	United Kingdom	The ship departed from Cardiff, Glamorgan for Shanghai, China. No further trace, presumed foundered with the loss of all hands.
Girondine	France	The schooner collided with a steamship and sank off Sandown Castle, Kent, United Kingdom. She was on a voyage from Marans, Charente-Inférieure to London, United Kingdom. She was refloated on 18 March and beached at Deal, Kent before being towed in to Ramsgate, Kent
John and James	United Kingdom	The schooner ran aground on the Blacktail Sand, in the Thames Estuary. She was on a voyage from Granton, Lothian to London. She was refloated the next day with the assistance of a tug.
John Vaughan	United Kingdom	The steamship ran aground off Borkum, Denmark and was wrecked. She was on a voyage from Memel, Germany to Schiedam, South Holland, Netherlands.
Jupiter	Germany	The barque was abandoned in ice off the west coast of Sweden.
Leontine	France	The barque was wrecked on the Juan de Nova Reefs, in the Mozambique Channel. She was on a voyage from Rio de Janeiro, Brazil to Zanzibar.
Margaret and Mary	United Kingdom	The ship was driven ashore and wrecked 4 nautical miles (7.4 km) west of Findhorn, Moray. She was on a voyage from London to Burghead, Moray.
Marie Leonie	France	The ship was driven ashore at Dunkirk, Nord. She was on a voyage from Sunderland, County Durham, United Kingdom to Bayonne, Basses-Pyrénées.
Mary Ida	Flag unknown	The ship ran aground on the Sud, near the mouth of the Oste. She was refloated.
Minerva	United Kingdom	The brig was driven ashore at Kilroot, County Antrim. She was on a voyage from Belfast, County Antrim to Maryport, Cumberland.
Nancy	United Kingdom	The brig was driven ashore in the Belfast Lough. She was on a voyage from Troon, Ayrshire to Belfast.
Storm King	United States	The ship was driven ashore in the Berry Islands, Bahamas. She was on a voyage from New York to Mobile, Alabama. She was refloated with assistance from the schooners Advance and Scent (both Bahamas) and taken in to Nassau, Bahamas for repairs.
Sutherland	United Kingdom	The steamship was driven ashore on Heligoland. She was on a voyage from Liverpool, Lancashire to Hamburg, Germany. She was refloated with assistance from another steamship.
William	United Kingdom	The schooner was abandoned off Annalong, County Down. Her five crew were rescued by the Newcastle Lifeboat Reigate ( Royal National Lifeboat Institution) before she sank. William was on a voyage from Troon, Ayrshire to Dublin.
William	United States	The ship ran aground on the Brake Sand. She was on a voyage from Antwerp, Belgium to New York. She was refloated and taken in to The Downs.
Unnamed	France	The fishing vessel was driven ashore and wrecked 3 nautical miles (5.6 km) east of Littlehampton, Sussex, United Kingdom.

== 2 March ==
List of shipwrecks: 2 March 1871
Ship	State	Description
Emilie	Denmark	The ship sprang a leak and sank in the Kattegat off Domsten, Sweden. Her crew were rescued. She was on a voyage from Newcastle upon Tyne, Northumberland, United Kingdom to Præstø.
Evangelistra	Greece	The ship was wrecked on "Long Island", in the Gulf of Smyrna with the loss of all hands. She was on a voyage from Smyrna, Ottoman Empire to Falmouth, Cornwall or Queenstown, County Cork, United Kingdom.
Louisa Ann Fanny	United Kingdom	The steamship ran aground off Hellevoetsluis, Zeeland, Netherlands. She was on a voyage from London to Rotterdam, South Holland, Netherlands. She was refloated.

== 3 March ==
List of shipwrecks: 3 March 1871
Ship	State	Description
Albania	United Kingdom	The ship was sighted in the Atlantic Ocean whilst on a voyage from Tayport, Fife to Berbice, British Guiana. No further trace, presumed foundered with the loss of all hands.
Blairmore	United Kingdom	The ship was wrecked near Probolinggo, Netherlands East Indies. She was on a voyage from Surabaya, Netherlands East Indies to London.
Maria Junge	Germany	The ship was wrecked on Amrum. Her crew survived. She was on a voyage from Liverpool, Lancashire, United Kingdom to Bremen.
Palanyandaven	(United Kingdom of Great Britain and Ireland) Burma	The ship was abandoned at sea in a sinking condition.

== 4 March ==
List of shipwrecks: 4 March 1871
Ship	State	Description
Fairy King	United Kingdom	The steamship was run into by the steamship Knapton Hall (United Kingdom) and was beached in the River Thames at Blackwall, Middlesex.
Tribune	United Kingdom	The ship ran aground on the Flat Island Shoal, off the coast of Burma. She was on a voyage from Akyab, Burma to Queenstown, County Cork. She was refloated on 8 March and resumed her voyage on 11 March.

== 5 March ==
List of shipwrecks: 5 March 1871
Ship	State	Description
Charles	United Kingdom	The brig was driven ashore at Crookhaven, County Cork. She was refloated and found to be leaky.
Elizabeth	(Dominion of Newfoundland) Newfoundland Colony	The brig was abandoned in the Atlantic Ocean. Her crew were rescued. She was on a voyage from Saint John's to Barbados.
Lapwing	United Kingdom	The schooner was run down and sunk in the North Sea off the Dudgeon Lightship ( Trinity House) by the steamship John Wells (United Kingdom). Her crew were rescued by John Wells.
Wolfville	Canada	The ship was wrecked off St Anthony Head, Cornwall, United Kingdom. She was on a voyage from Liverpool, Lancashire, United Kingdom to Bombay, India.

== 6 March ==
List of shipwrecks: 6 March 1871
Ship	State	Description
Figlio d'Italia	Italy	The ship ran aground at St Mawes, Cornwall, United Kingdom. She was on a voyage from Odesa, Russia to Falmouth, Cornwall. She was refloated and towed in to Falmouth.
Grisi	Austria-Hungary	The barque was driven ashore and wrecked in Mount's Bay. Her crew were rescued. She was on a voyage from London, United Kingdom to Odesa.
Helena	United Kingdom	The barque was driven ashore at Padstow, Cornwall. She was on a voyage from Cardiff, Glamorgan to Maranhão, Brazil. She was refloated.

== 7 March ==
List of shipwrecks: 7 March 1871
Ship	State	Description
Cornish Lass	United Kingdom	The brig ran aground at Waterford. She was on a voyage from Runcorn, Cheshire to Plymouth, Devon. She was refloated and taken in to Waterford.
Eagle	United Kingdom	The ship departed from Hartlepool, County Durham for Dunkirk, Nord. No further trace, presumed foundered with the loss of all hands.
Friends	United Kingdom	The schooner was driven ashore near Donaghadee, County Down. She was on a voyage from Troon, Ayrshire to Portaferry, County Down. She was refloated and resumed her voyage.
Margaret Menear	United Kingdom	The ship was driven ashore near "Fort Cacella", Spain.
Maria Emma	Portugal	The schooner was wrecked at Mazagan, Morocco.
New North Star	(United Kingdom of Great Britain and Ireland) Gibraltar	The brig was wrecked at Mazagan.
Oscar	Russia	The schooner was driven ashore near Thisted, Denmark. Her crew were rescued. She was on a voyage from Dysart, Fife, United Kingdom to Rostock, Germany.
Solthum	Flag unknown	The ship was wrecked on the Jadder Sandbank, in the North Sea.
St. Philomene	United Kingdom	The ship was driven ashore at Bournemouth, Hampshire. She was refloated.
William	United Kingdom	The smack ran aground and sank in the River Avon. She was on a voyage from Waterford to Bristol, Gloucestershire.

== 8 March ==
List of shipwrecks: 8 March 1871
Ship	State	Description
Camel	United Kingdom	The ship was driven ashore near Irvine, Ayrshire. She was on a voyage from Bangor to Irvine. She was refloated on 22 March.
Emanuel	Germany	The schooner was driven ashore at Barna, County Galway, United Kingdom. She was declared a total loss.
Great Britain	United Kingdom	The schooner foundered at Penarth, Glamorgan. Her crew were rescued. She was on a voyage from Greenock, Renfrewshire to Cardiff, Glamorgan. She was later refloated and taken in to Cardiff.
Hope	(United Kingdom of Great Britain and Ireland) Isle of Man	The ship foundered off Garwick with the loss of all three crew. She was on a voyage from Laxey to Port Dundas, Renfrewshire.
John Bell	United Kingdom	The schooner was abandoned off Cape Finisterre, Spain. Her crew were rescued by the barque Victory (United Kingdom). John Bell was on a voyage from Newport, Monmouthshire to Gibraltar.
Northern Star	United Kingdom	The ship was wrecked at Wexford with the loss of all hands.
W. H. Moody	United States	The ship was abandoned in the Atlantic Ocean. Her crew were rescued by Cremona (United Kingdom). W. H. Moody was on a voyage from Liverpool, Lancashire, United Kingdom to Pensacola, Florida.
USS Worcester	United States Navy	The Contoocook-class sloop suffered a boiler explosion in the Atlantic Ocean, killing four and severely injuring six of her crew. She was on her maiden voyage, from Boston, Massachusetts to London, United Kingdom.

== 9 March ==
List of shipwrecks: 9 March 1871
Ship	State	Description
Daring	United Kingdom	The full-rigged ship was driven ashore and wrecked at Pwlldu Bay, Glamorgan, Wales, with the loss of all six crew. She was being towed from Swansea to Cardiff, Wales.
Echo	United Kingdom	The fishing lugger ran into the schooner Elizabeth (United Kingdom) off Great Yarmouth, Norfolk and was abandoned by her crew. She was subsequently taken in to Great Yarmouth by the Great Yarmouth Lifeboat.
Isabella	United Kingdom	The schooner was driven ashore at Blackrock, County Dublin. Her crew were rescued. She was on a voyage from Dublin to Portaferry, County Down.
Mermaid	(United Kingdom of Great Britain and Ireland) Jersey	The ship sank at Haverfordwest, Pembrokeshire. She was on a voyage from London to Haverfordwest.
North Branch	United Kingdom	The ship was driven ashore and wrecked near Maryport, Cumberland. Her crew were rescued.
Shooting Star	United Kingdom	The ship was driven ashore and wrecked at Allonby, Cumberland. Her crew were rescued.
Verbena	United Kingdom	The ship ran aground on the Knowl Sand, in the North Sea off the coast of Norfolk. Her crew were rescued. She was on a voyage from Goole, Yorkshire to King's Lynn, Norfolk.
Vine	United Kingdom	The schooner ran aground on the Scroby Sands, Norfolk. She was refloated and assisted in to Great Yarmouth, Norfolk in a leaky condition.
Wave	United Kingdom	The ship collided with the steamship Charles Mitchell (United Kingdom) and sank off Lowestoft, Suffolk. Her crew were rescued by Charles Mitchell. Wave was on a voyage from Leith, Lothian to London.
Zenobia	United Kingdom	The ship was driven ashore and wrecked at "Anse-au-Beurre", between Berck and Étaples, Pas-de-Calais, France with the loss of all hands. She was on a voyage from Agrigento, Sicily, Italy to Harburg, Germany.
Zephyr	United Kingdom	The ship was driven ashore and wrecked at Allonby. Her crew were rescued. She was on a voyage from Belfast, County Antrim to Maryport, Cumberland.

== 10 March ==
List of shipwrecks: 10 March 1871
Ship	State	Description
Dido	United Kingdom	The steamship put in to A Coruña, Spain on fire. She was on a voyage from Hull, Yorkshire to Trieste.
Euroclydon	United Kingdom	The brig foundered in the North Sea 50 nautical miles (93 km) off Heligoland. Her crew were rescued. She was on a voyage from Sunderland, County Durham to Hamburg, Germany.
Fortuneteller	United Kingdom	The ship was driven ashore and wrecked at Spurn Point, Yorkshire. Her crew were rescued. She was on a voyage from Clackmannan to Plymouth, Devon.

== 11 March ==
List of shipwrecks: 11 March 1871
Ship	State	Description
Canova	United States	The full-rigged ship was abandoned in the Atlantic Ocean. Her crew were rescued by the schooner Equator (Bahamas). Canova was on a voyage from Liverpool, Lancashire, United Kingdom to Charleston, South Carolina.
Charles Albert	United Kingdom	The brig was wrecked on Ragged Island, Bahamas. Her crew survived. She was on a voyage from Liverpool, Lancashire to Baltimore, Maryland, United States.
Desire	United Kingdom	The fishing lugger was run down by the steamship Corlic (United Kingdom) off The Lizard, Cornwall with the loss of seven of her eight crew. The survivor was rescued by Corlic. The wreck was towed in to Porthleven by the fishing boat Warder (United Kingdom).
Ettore	Italy	The brig ran aground on the Shipwash Sand, in the North Sea off the coast of Suffolk, United Kingdom. She was refloated and assisted in to Harwich, Essex, United Kingdom in a severely leaky condition.
Sancta Maria	Norway	The ship was driven ashore on Læsø, Denmark. She was on a voyage from Riga, Russia to Randers. She was refloated and taken in to Fredrikshavn Denmark in a leaky condition.

== 12 March ==
List of shipwrecks: 12 March 1871
Ship	State	Description
Diamant	(United Kingdom of Great Britain and Ireland) Jersey	The smack collided with the tug Prudhoe and sank off Dimlington, Yorkshire. She was on a voyage from Arbroath, Forfarshire to Jersey.
Hope	United Kingdom	The schooner was driven ashore and wrecked on "Point Holme Island", Anglesey. Her crew were rescued. She was on a voyage from Dublin to Bangor, Caernarfonshire.
Johanne	Germany	The ship was driven ashore and wrecked on Læsø, Denmark. She was on a voyage from Fowey, Cornwall, United Kingdom to Stettin. She was later refloated and assisted in to Fredrikshavn, Denmark.

== 13 March ==
List of shipwrecks: 13 March 1871
Ship	State	Description
Dagma	Netherlands	The ship was wrecked on the Nidingen Reef, in the Baltic Sea. She was on a voyage from Saint Petersburg, Russia to Schiedam, South Holland.
Dinorure	United Kingdom	The ship ran aground on the Longsand, in the North Sea off the coast of Essex. She was on a voyage from Caernarfon to Calais, France. She was refloated and assisted in to Harwich, Essex.
Elizabeth	Germany	The ship was driven ashore in the Elbe. She was on a voyage from Hartlepool, County Durham, United Kingdom to Hamburg.
Hannah	United Kingdom	The schooner foundered off St. Abbs Head, Berwickshire. Her crew were rescued by Velocipede (United Kingdom).
Improvement	United Kingdom	The ship was driven ashore at Lindisfarne, Northumberland. She was on a voyage from Berwick upon Tweed to Newcastle upon Tyne. She was refloated and found to be leaky.
Martin Luther	Germany	The ship was wrecked on the Nidingen Reef. Her crew were rescued. She was on a voyage from Memel to Cardiff, Glamorgan, United Kingdom. Martin Luther was later refloated and taken in to Onsala, Sweden in a severely damaged condition.
Provanhall	United Kingdom	The steam lighter sank. Her crew were rescued. She was on a voyage from Greenock, Renfrewshire to Shandon, Argyllshire.
Spindrift	United Kingdom	The tug collided with the steamship City of Exeter (United Kingdom) off Fairlight, Sussex. She was towed in to Dover, Kent in a waterlogged condition by the tug Rescue (United Kingdom).
Venus	Germany	The galiot sank in the Elbe. Her crew were rescued by a pilot galiot.

== 14 March ==
List of shipwrecks: 14 March 1871
Ship	State	Description
Fern	United Kingdom	The ship ran aground at Milford Haven, Pembrokeshire. She was on a voyage from Liverpool, Lancashire to Barbados.
Tilly	India	The coaster, a steamship was driven ashore at Quilandy. She was on a voyage from Karaikal to Bombay. She subsequently became a wreck.
Veronica	United Kingdom	The barque was destroyed by fire in the Bay of Bengal. Her crew were rescued by Planet (United Kingdom). Veronica was on a voyage from Madras, India to London.

== 15 March ==
List of shipwrecks: 15 March 1871
Ship	State	Description
Aquila	United Kingdom	The ship ran aground on the Pickles Reef, off the coast of Florida, United States. She was on a voyage from Havana, Cuba to Queenstown, County Cork.
Burgermeister von Satten	Netherlands	The ship ran aground off Wieringen, North Holland. She was on a voyage from Harlingen, Friesland to Aberdeen, United Kingdom. She was refloated and taken in to Texel, North Holland.
Collingwood	United Kingdom	The ship was driven ashore and wrecked at Lyme Regis, Dorset.
Dacca	United Kingdom	The steamship ran aground on the College Sand, in the Hooghly River. She was refloated and resumed her voyage.
Emma	United Kingdom	The ship foundered off Portishead, Somerset. Her crew were rescued. She was on a voyage from Lydney, Gloucestershire to Newport, Monmouthshire.
Igoma	United Kingdom	The ship was wrecked on the No Name Cay, in the Abaco Islands. She was on a voyage from New York to Galveston, Texas, United States.
Navette	France	The ship collided with the steamship Vigilant (United Kingdom) and sank with the loss of five of her seven crew.
Princess	United Kingdom	The schooner ran aground at Wexford. She was on a voyage from Ayr to Wexford.
Venus	United Kingdom	The brig collided with the steamship Shepperton (United Kingdom) and sank off the Dudgeon Sandbank, in the North Sea with the loss of two of her seven crew. Survivors were rescued by Shepperton. Venus was on a voyage from South Shields to Delfshaven, South Holland, Netherlands.
Versailles	United Kingdom	The barque was driven ashore and wrecked at Galveston, Texas, United States. Her crew were rescued. She was on a voyage from Galveston to Liverpool, Lancashire.
Unnamed	Flag unknown	The brigantine ran aground on the Goodwin Sands, Kent, United Kingdom.

== 16 March ==
List of shipwrecks: 16 March 1871
Ship	State	Description
Bliss	(United Kingdom of Great Britain and Ireland) Jersey	The smack collided with the steamship Ossian (United Kingdom) and sank in the English Channel off the Isle of Wight. Her crew were rescued by Ossian. Bliss was on a voyage from Southampton, Hampshire to Guernsey, Channel Islands.
Duchess of Sutherland	United Kingdom	The ship was driven ashore in the River Fal.
Ebenezer	United Kingdom	The schooner foundered in The Wold. Her four crew took to a boat; they were rescued the next day by Why Not (United Kingdom). Ebenezer was on a voyage from London to Aberdeen.
Equestrian	United Kingdom	The ketch ran aground on Scroby Sands, Norfolk. She was refloated with the assistance of a tug and towed in to Great Yarmouth in a leaky condition.
Ethel	United Kingdom	The schooner collided with a steamship in the North Sea off the coast of Yorkshire. Her crew were rescued by Star (United Kingdom). Ethel was on a voyage from Dordrecht, South Holland, Netherlands to South Shields. She was taken in to Middlesbrough, Yorkshire in a derelict condition.
Fortuna	Germany	The ship ran aground at Malmö, Sweden. She was on a voyage from Memel to Exmouth, Devon, United Kingdom.
Giulietta	Austria-Hungary	The brig was destroyed by fire at Penarth, Glamorgan, United Kingdom. She was on a voyage from Swansea, Glamorgan to Trieste.
Greatham	United Kingdom	The ship was wrecked on the Cork Sand, in the North Sea off the coast of Essex. Her crew were rescued. She was on a voyage from Hartlepool, County Durham to London.
Louisa	United Kingdom	The smack was driven ashore at Penarth. Her crew were rescued. She was on a voyage from Cardiff, Glamorgan to Newport, Monmouthshire.
Lucie Antoinette	France	The schooner was wrecked on the Goodwin Sands. Her five crew were rescued but her captain refused to abandon ship. She was on a voyage from Nantes, Loire-Inférieure to Middlesbrough or vice versa. Her captain was rescued in an intoxicated state the next day by the lugger Buffalo Gal (United Kingdom), he had freely imbibed of a cask of brandy.
Majestic	United Kingdom	The Thames barge was driven ashore near Southwold, Suffolk. Her crew were rescued. She was on a voyage from Beccles, Suffolk to Woolwich, Kent.
Mayflower	United Kingdom	The barque was wrecked on the Kentish Knock. Six of her seventeen crew were reported missing. She was on a voyage from Newcastle upon Tyne, Northumberland to "Agasteria".
Panope	United Kingdom	The ship was wrecked on the Gunfleet Sand, in the North Sea off the coast of Essex. Her crew were rescued. She was on a voyage from Hartlepool to London.
Patriot	Norway	The brig was wrecked on the Haisborough Sands, in the North Sea off the coast of Norfolk. Two of her nine crew took to a boat; they reached shore. The rest of her crew were rescued by the steamship Leeds (United Kingdom). Patriot was on a voyage from South Shields, County Durham to Galaţi, Ottoman Empire.
Protector	United Kingdom	The lugger collided with the sailing barge Antelope (United Kingdom) and was abandoned in the English Channel between Dover and Folkestone, Kent. Her ten crew were rescued by Antelope. Protector was on a voyage from Lowestoft, Suffolk to Plymouth, Devon.
Ruby	United Kingdom	The lighter stuck a sunken rock and sank. Her crew survived. She was on a voyage from Glasgow, Renfrewshire to Cove, Dunbartonshire.
Stephenson	United Kingdom	The steamship ran aground on the Fultah Sand, in the Hooghly River. She was on a voyage from London to Calcutta, India. She was refloated the next day with the assistance of a tug and completed her voyage.
Unnamed	United Kingdom	The Thames barge foundered off Walmer, Kent. Her crew were rescued.
Unnamed	Flag unknown	The ship ran aground off Bray, County Wicklow, United Kingdom.
Unnamed	Flag unknown	The ship ran aground on the Codding Bank, off the coast of County Wicklow.
Unknown	United Kingdom	The smack was driven ashore in Brandon Bay with the loss of all hands.

== 17 March ==
List of shipwrecks: March 1871
Ship	State	Description
Ann Mitchel	United Kingdom	The schooner was driven ashore at Goodwick, Pembrokeshire. Her crew were rescued by the Goodwick Lifeboat Sir Edward Perrot ( Royal National Lifeboat Institution).
Britannia	United Kingdom	The ship ran aground on the Spaniard Sand. She was on a voyage from Jersey to Chatham, Kent. She was refloated with assistance and taken in to The Swale in a leaky condition.
Carnsew	United Kingdom	The schooner was driven ashore at Goodwick. Her crew were rescued by the Goodwick Lifeboat Sir Edward Perrot ( Royal National Lifeboat Institution).
Coral Queen	United Kingdom	The barque ran aground off Anholt, Denmark. She was refloated on 22 March and taken in to Helsingør, Denmark.
John Bright	United Kingdom	The brigantine was wrecked on the Folly Reef, off Aux Cayes, Haiti. Her crew were rescued by the steamship American (United Kingdom). John Bright was on a voyage from Sunderland, County Durham to St. Jago de Cuba, Cuba.
Liberty	United Kingdom	The schooner ran aground on the Spaniard Sand. She was on a voyage from South Shields, County Durham to Portland, Dorset.
Moses Parry	United Kingdom	The schooner was driven ashore at Fishguard, Pembrokeshire. Her crew were rescued.
Nil Desperandum	United Kingdom	The ship ran aground on the Galloper Sandbank. She was on a voyage from Goole, Yorkshire to Leuven (Louvain), Flemish Brabant, Belgium. She was refloated and assisted in to Ramsgate, Kent.
Norval	Netherlands	The ship was driven ashore near Brielle, South Holland. She was refloated.
Phœnix	France	The cutter sank off Jersey, Channel Islands with the loss of all hands.
Queen of the Thames	United Kingdom	The steamship was wrecked east of Struys Point, Cape Colony with the loss of four lives. There were more than 350 survivors. She was on the return leg of her maiden voyage, from Melbourne, Victoria to London.

== 18 March ==
List of shipwrecks: 18 March 1871
Ship	State	Description
Emperor	United Kingdom	The brig ran aground on the Corton Sand, in the North Sea off the coast of Suffolk. She was refloated. She was on a voyage from South Shields, County Durham to Woolwich, Kent. She was refloated the next day and resumed her voyage.
Queen of the Thames	United Kingdom	The steamship was driven ashore at Struys Point, Cape Colony with the loss of four of the 350 people on board. She was on a voyage from Melbourne Victoria to London.

== 19 March ==
List of shipwrecks: 19 March 1871
Ship	State	Description
Anna Aldrup	Germany	The ship ran aground on the Lentsmuir Sands, in the North Sea off the coast of Fife, United Kingdom. She was on a voyage from Emden to Dysart, Fife. She was refloated and resumed her voyage.
Falken	Norway	The ship ran aground on the Nidingen Reef, in the Baltic Sea and was wrecked.
Hesperus	Germany	The schooner collided with the steamship Gnome (United Kingdom) and was abandoned in the North Sea. Her crew were rescued. Hesperus was on a voyage from Bremen to Leith, Lothian, United Kingdom. She was presumed to have sunk
Limerick	United Kingdom	The steamship was driven ashore and wrecked at Greystones, County Wicklow. She was on a voyage from Huelva, Spain to Grangemouth, Stirlingshire. She was refloated on 10 June and towed in to Kingstown, County Dublin.
Lizard	United Kingdom	The ship was wrecked at "Colonna Point". Her crew were rescued. She was on a voyage from Lagos, Africa to Marseille, Bouches-du-Rhône, France.
Thomas Hope	United Kingdom	The sloop was destroyed by fire in the Scheldt. She was on a voyage from Antwerp, Belgium to Caen, Calvados, France.

== 20 March ==
List of shipwrecks: 20 March 1871
Ship	State	Description
Anna	Canada	The schooner was wrecked on Wood Island, New Brunswick with the loss of two of her crew. She was on a voyage from Saint John, New Brunswick to Boston, Massachusetts, United States.
Betty	United Kingdom	The ship collided with the schooner Tiger (United Kingdom) at Waterford and was beached. She was on a voyage from Waterford to Saint-Malo, Ille-et-Vilaine, France.
Captain	United Kingdom	The brig was wrecked on a reef off Norderney, Germany. She was on a voyage from Sunderland, County Durham to Hamburg, Germany
Cornwall	United Kingdom	The barque collided with the steamship Himalaya (United Kingdom) and sank off Lundy Island, Devon with the loss of eleven of the seventeen people on board. Cornwall was on a voyage from Navassa, North Carolina, United States to Gloucester.
Hesperus	Germany	The ship collided with a steamship in the North Sea and was abandoned by her crew, who were rescued by the steamship. Hesperus was on a voyage from Bremerhaven to Leith, Lothian, United Kingdom. She was subsequently discovered by the yawl No. 40 (United Kingdom) and towed in to Yorkshire, United Kingdom, where she arrived on 25 March.
Markwell	United Kingdom	The ship was driven ashore at Kandestederne, Denmark. She was on a voyage from Hartlepool, County Durham to Danzig, Germany. She was refloated and taken in to Fredrikshavn, Denmark.
Orient	United Kingdom	The ship collided with another vessel in the Bristol Channel 30 nautical miles (56 km) off Minehead, Somerset. She was on a voyage from Liverpool, Lancashire to Africa. She consequently foundered the next day. Her crew were rescued.
Star of Hope	United Kingdom	The ship ran aground on the Codling Bank, in the Irish Sea. She was on a voyage from Liverpool to San Francisco, California, United States. She was refloated and put back to Liverpool in a leaky condition.
Yangtze	United Kingdom	The steamship was wrecked 12 nautical miles (22 km) from Nagasaki, Japan. Her crew survived.

== 21 March ==
List of shipwrecks: 21 March 1871
Ship	State	Description
Carrie M. L.	United Kingdom	The brig was driven ashore and wrecked at Opobo, Africa. She was on a voyage from Glasgow, Renfrewshire to Opobo.
Evelina	United Kingdom	The ship was abandoned in the Pacific Ocean. Her crew were rescued. She was on a voyage from a British port to Valparaíso, Chile.
John and Charles	United Kingdom	The schooner ran aground on the Salthouse Bank, in the Irish Sea off the coast of Lancashire, and sank. Her crew survived. She was on a voyage from Preston, Lancashire to New York, United States.
King Jaja	United Kingdom	The steamship ran aground at Opobo. She was refloated.
Niobe	United Kingdom	The steamship was driven ashore and wrecked at Hullo, Russia. She was on a voyage from Hull, Yorkshire to Reval, Russia.

== 22 March ==
List of shipwrecks: 22 March 1871
Ship	State	Description
Pacific	United Kingdom	The steamship ran aground near "Beregat".
Rover	United Kingdom	The yacht ran aground on the Salthouse Bank, in the Irish Sea off the coast of Lancashire. She was refloated the next day.

== 23 March ==
List of shipwrecks: 23 March 1871
Ship	State	Description
Acapulco	France	The barque was run down and sunk in the English Channel 37 nautical miles (69 km) south east of Portland, Dorset, United Kingdom by the full-rigged ship County of Forfar (United Kingdom). All on board were rescued by County of Forfar. Acapulco was on a voyage from Mexico to Havre de Grâce, Seine-Inférieure.
Grietje	Netherlands	The ship departed from Vlissingen, Zeeland for Königsberg, Germany. No further trace, presumed foundered with the loss of all hands.
Isabella	United Kingdom	The brigantine ran aground on the Cockle Sand, in the North Sea off the coast of Norfolk. She was on a voyage from Hartlepool, County Durham to Folkestone, Kent. She was refloated and put in to Lowestoft, Suffolk.
Kirkconnel	United Kingdom	The ship was driven ashore. She was on a voyage from Glencaple, Dumfriesshire to Miramichi, New Brunswick, Canada. She was refloated on 5 April and taken in to Maryport, Cumberland.
Lilias	(United Kingdom of Great Britain and Ireland) Isle of Man	The schooner was driven ashore "on the Briggs". She was on a voyage from the Clyde to Dublin. She was refloated and taken in to Belfast, County Antrim for repairs.
Mary	Canada	The barque foundered in the Atlantic Ocean. Her crew took to two boats, but did not expect to survive, according to a message in a bottle washed up at Ballyhire, County Wexford, United Kingdom in mid-May.
Phœbie	Canada	The schooner capsized at Halifax, Nova Scotia.
Scorpia	United Kingdom	The steamship ran aground at Sunderland, County Durham. She was on a voyage from Sunderland to the Charente. She was refloated and resumed her voyage.

== 24 March ==
List of shipwrecks: 24 March 1871
Ship	State	Description
Anastasie	France	The schooner ran aground on the Goodwin Sands, Kent, United Kingdom. She was refloated and taken in to The Downs.
Cadzandria	Netherlands	The brigantine ran aground on the Goodwin Sands. She was on a voyage from Antwerp, Belgium to Runcorn, Cheshire, United Kingdom. She was refloated and taken in to The Downs in a leaky condition.
Clara Wheeler	United Kingdom	The barque was wrecked on the west coast of Uist, Outer Hebrides. Her 23 crew were rescued. She was on a voyage from Águilas, Spain to Leith, Lothian. She was refloated on 22 August and beached on Barra, Outer Hebrides, where she was broken up.
Fanny Hilberry	United Kingdom	The ship was driven ashore on Sherbro Island, Sierra Leone. She was later refloated.
Glastry	United Kingdom	The brig was run ashore on Lady Isle, in the Firth of Clyde. She was on a voyage from Troon, Ayrshire to Dublin. She was refloated and resumed her voyage.
Johanna	Netherlands	The schooner ran aground on the Outer Bank, off Terschelling, Friesland, and sank. She was on a voyage from Hamburg, Germany to Amsterdam, North Holland.
Maury	Norway	The barque was driven ashore at Dungeness, Kent. She was on a voyage from South Shields, County Durham, United Kingdom to New York. She was refloated and towed in to Dover, Kent by two tugs.
Nina	United Kingdom	The brig was wrecked in the Elbe 5 nautical miles (9.3 km) upstream of Glückstadt, Germany. She was on a voyage from South Shields, County Durham to Hamburg, Germany.

== 25 March ==
List of shipwrecks: 25 March 1871
Ship	State	Description
Archimedes	United Kingdom	The steamship was driven ashore at Ballyferris Point, County Down. She was on a voyage from the Clyde to Buenos Aires, Argentina. She was refloated and resumed her voyage.
Triton	Sweden	The ship was wrecked on the Lillegrunden, in the Baltic Sea. Her crew were rescued. She was on a voyage from Newcastle upon Tyne, Northumberland, United Kingdom to Lübeck, Germany.
Twilight	New Zealand	The 55-ton schooner was wrecked near Cape Maria van Diemen, New Zealand during a gale, with the loss of two crew. She was on a voyage from Kaipara Harbour to Auckland.

== 26 March ==
List of shipwrecks: 26 March 1871
Ship	State	Description
Mary Ann	United Kingdom	The ship was driven ashore at Portaferry, County Down. She was on a voyage from Portsmouth, Hampshire to Glasgow, Renfrewshire. She was refloated.
Nestor	United Kingdom	The ship ran aground in the River Moy. She was on a voyage from Liverpool, Lancashire to Ballina, County Mayo.

== 27 March ==
List of shipwrecks: 27 March 1871
Ship	State	Description
Annie Rosetta	United Kingdom	The schooner ran aground and heeled over at Shoreham-by-Sea, Sussex. She was righted with assistance from the Thames barge Hardy (United Kingdom).
Diadem	United Kingdom	The ship ran aground at Garston, Lancashire and broke her back. She was refloated on 4 April and taken in to Liverpool.
Hindu	Norway	The 255-ton brig hit rocks in Foveaux Strait while on a voyage from Fuzhou, China to Dunedin, New Zealand. Her crew were rescued. Attempts at refloating the vessel failed and she broke up in a heavy surf. All 15 crew survived.
Rose	United Kingdom	The sloop sank 12 nautical miles (22 km) north north east of Blakeney, Norfolk. Her crew survived.

== 28 March ==
List of shipwrecks: 28 March 1871
Ship	State	Description
Daniel O'Connell	United Kingdom	The schooner was driven ashore near "Voel Nant". She was later refloated.
Hibernia	United Kingdom	The brig was driven ashore near Dublin. She was on a voyage from Maryport, Cumberland to Dublin.
Minna	Germany	The ship was driven ashore near Rügenwalde. Her crew were rescued.
Penelope	United Kingdom	The brig ran aground on the Blackwater Bank, in the Irish Sea. She was on a voyage from Newport, Monmouthshire to Dublin. She was refloated and beached at Dunmore East, County Waterford.
Ydun	Norway	The barque was wrecked on the Goodwin Sands, Kent, United Kingdom. Her crew were rescued by the Broadstairs and Ramsgate Lifeboats. She was on a voyage from Newcastle upon Tyne, Northumberland, United Kingdom to Venice, Italy.

== 29 March ==
List of shipwrecks: 29 March 1871
Ship	State	Description
Diadem	United Kingdom	The ship ran aground off Garston, Lancashire. She was on a voyage from Santander, Spain to Liverpool Lancashire. She was refloated on 3 April and taken in to Liverpool.
Jane Leech	United Kingdom	The ship was abandoned off El Hierro, Canary Islands and foundered. Her crew were rescued. She was on a voyage from Glasgow, Renfrewshire to Madras, India.
Mary J. Wilson	United States	The ship ran aground on a reef off the Abaco Islands. She was on a voyage from Newport, Monmouthshire, United Kingdom to Galveston, Texas. She was refloated and taken in to Nassau, Bahamas.
Weardale	United Kingdom	The brig sprang a leak and was abandoned. Her crew were rescued by the schooner Aurora Opeica (Flag unknown). Weardale was on a voyage from Blyth, Northumberland to Cartagena, Spain.

== 30 March ==
List of shipwrecks: 30 March 1871
Ship	State	Description
Eliza	United Kingdom	The ship was lost in Brandon Bay. She was on a voyage from Kilrush, County Clare to Castletown, Isle of Man.
Lucy H. Gibson	United States	The schooner collided with the full-rigged ship Clifford (United Kingdom) and sank in the Bay of Biscay. A crew member was reported missing; survivors were rescued by the brig Angelina (Netherlands). Lucy H. Gibson was on a voyage from Liverpool, Lancashire, United Kingdom to Boston, Massachusetts.
Mary Wilson	United Kingdom	The brig ran aground at Bayonne, Basses-Pyrénées. She was on a voyage from Ardrossan, Ayrshire to Bayonne. She was refloated in early April.

== 31 March ==
List of shipwrecks: 31 March 1871
Ship	State	Description
Allan	United Kingdom	The lighter sank at Port Glasgow, Renfrewshire. She was being towed from Paisley to Greenock.
Sunbeam	United States	The barque sprang a leak and sank at Rangoon, Burma.
Wilhelmine	Germany	The ship was wrecked on the Grote Vogelsand, in the North Sea. Her crew were rescued. She was on a voyage from Sunderland, County Durham, United Kingdom to Hamburg.
Wynyard	United Kingdom	The ship was wrecked north of the Kullen Lighthouse, Sweden. She was on a voyage from Blyth, Northumberland to Copenhagen, Denmark.

== Unknown date ==
List of shipwrecks: Unknown date in March 1871
Ship	State	Description
Aberdeenshire	United Kingdom	The ship was driven ashore. She was on a voyage from Rochester, Kent to South Shields, County Durham. She was refloated and found to be leaky.
Albert	United Kingdom	The ship was driven ashore near Dungeness, Kent. Her crew were rescued by the Coastguard.
Alida	Germany	The ship was driven ashore west of Burntisland, Fife, United Kingdom. She was refloated.
Ameral	(United Kingdom of Great Britain and Ireland) Straits Settlements	The ship ran aground on the Britto Shoal. She was on a voyage from Saigon, French Indo-China to Hong Kong. She was refloated and put back to Saigon, where she was condemned.
Andrea Danovaro	Italy	The ship ran aground in the Dardanelles. She was on a voyage from Genoa to the Danube.
Andromeda	United Kingdom	The ship was lost before 8 March.
Anna	Flag unknown	The ship was driven ashore on Öland, Sweden. She was on a voyage from "Colbjarnsen" to an English port. She was refloated and resumed her voyage.
Anne Beer	United Kingdom	The ship ran aground on the Shipwash Sand, in the North Sea off the coast of Suffolk. She was on a voyage from Liverpool, Lancashire to Newcastle upon Tyne, Northumberland. She was refloated and put in to Dover, Kent.
Annie	United Kingdom	The ship was wrecked. She was on a voyage from Tobago to Barbados.
Aporlo	Denmark	The ship was holed by ice and beached on the Krautsand.
Atlas	United Kingdom	The steamship ran aground on the Romer Shoals. She was on a voyage from New York to New Orleans, Louisiana, United states. She was refloated and resumed her voyage.
Bengal	United Kingdom	The steamship ran aground in the Suez Canal after 8 March. She was on a voyage from China to London.
Bride	United Kingdom	The ship ran aground at Barber's Point, in the Dardanelles. She was on a voyage from Newcastle upon Tyne to Constantinople, Ottoman Empire. She was refloated but ran aground at Nugara Point. Again refloated, she ran aground a third time. She was refloated and towed in to Gallipoli, Ottoman Empire.
Brothers	United Kingdom	The ship was abandoned off "Canta", Spain. She was subsequently taken in to Canta by Spanish fishermen.
Busy Bee	United Kingdom	The Thames barge foundered off Lydd, Kent.
Candia	Spain	The barque caught fire at Manila, Spanish East Indies.
Caroline	United Kingdom	The ship ran aground at Berwick upon Tweed, Northumberland. She was on a voyage from Alexandria, Egypt to Berwick upon Tweed.
Charlotte	France	The ship was abandoned. She was on a voyage from Dieppe, Seine-Inférieure to Seville, Spain.
Chevreuil	France	The barque was driven ashore in Gibraltar Bay. She was on a voyage from Santos, Brazil to Gibraltar. She was refloated with the assistance of a number of tugs.
Clara Novello	United Kingdom	The ship ran aground. She was on a voyage from Llanelly to Neath, Glamorgan.
Collingwood	United Kingdom	The ship was driven ashore and wrecked at Lyme Regis, Dorset. She was on a voyage from Plymouth, Devon to Lyme Regis.
Colon	Flag unknown	The steamship was wrecked on Pomègues Island, Bouches-du-Rhône, France with the loss of a crew member. She was on a voyage from Barcelona, Spain to Marseille, Bouches-du-Rhône.
Cyberning	Netherlands	The ship ran aground at Brouwershaven, Zeeland. She was refloated and taken in to Hellevoetsluis, Zeeland.
Dædalus	United Kingdom	The ship was abandoned. Her crew were rescued by May Queen (United Kingdom). Dædalus was on a voyage from Doboy, Queensland to Swansea, Glamorgan.
Despatch	United Kingdom	The schooner was driven ashore at "Voel Nant". She was refloated.
Dunrobin Castle	United Kingdom	The ship was wrecked at Helmsdale, Sutherland.
Eaglescliffe	United Kingdom	The steamship foundered off the Longstone Lighthouse, Northumberland. Eight of her crew were rescued. She was on a voyage from Burntisland, Fife to Middlesbrough, Yorkshire.
E. F. Dunbar	United States	The barque was abandoned in the Atlantic Ocean.
Eglantine Esther	France	The ship was driven ashore at Koksijde, West Flanders, Belgium. She was on a voyage from Antwerp, Belgium to Dunkirk, Nord. She was later refloated.
Express	United Kingdom	The ship was driven ashore at Ryde, Isle of Wight. She was later refloated and resumed her voyage.
Germany	United Kingdom	The steamship ran aground in the Strait of Magellan before 11 March. She was refloated with assistance from the steamship Patagonia (United Kingdom) and continued her voyage to Valparaíso, Chile.
Gipsy Queen	United Kingdom	The ship was abandoned in the Atlantic Ocean. Her crew were rescued. She was on a voyage from Darien, Georgia, United States to Dublin.
Grace Redpath	United Kingdom	The barque ran aground on a reef. She was on a voyage from Sagua La Grande, Cuba to Portland, Maine United States. She was refloated and taken in to Key West, Florida, United States.
Grand Duchess	United Kingdom	The ship was wrecked in the Sunda Strait before 18 March. Her crew were rescued. She was on a voyage from London to Singapore, Straits Settlements.
Gussie Trueman	United States	The ship was driven ashore at Aspinwall, United States of Colombia. She was on a voyage from Baltimore, Maryland to Asinwall.
Helios	Netherlands	The ship was driven ashore at New Romney, Kent. She was on a voyage from Rotterdam, South Holland to Boston, Massachusetts, United States. She was refloated and taken in tow for Dover.
Herald	United Kingdom	The ship was driven ashore in the Belfast Lough. She was on a voyage from Bangor, County Down to "Beleneve".
Holyrood	United Kingdom	The steamship collided with the steamship Avebury (United Kingdom). she was beached near Vlissingen, Zeeland, Netherlands and sank.
Hope	United Kingdom	The ship ran aground at Malmö, Sweden. She was on a voyage from Malmö to London. She was refloated and resumed her voyage.
Ida	United Kingdom	The steamship collided with the steamship Vesta (United Kingdom) and was beached at Check Point, County Waterford. All on board were rescued.
Isabella	United Kingdom	The ship was driven ashore at Minorstown, County Down.
Isdahl	United Kingdom	The ship was wrecked on the Haisborough Sands, in the North Sea off the coast of Norfolk. She was on a voyage from South Shields to Galaţi, Ottoman Empire.
Johann White	United States	The ship was wrecked on Nashawena Island, Massachusetts. She was on a voyage from the Cape Verde Islands to Boston, Massachusetts.
Karikail	Flag unknown	The ship ran aground on the Salivedera Rocks. She was on a voyage from Nantes, Loire-Inférieure to Cádiz, Spain.
Leader	United Kingdom	The ship was abandoned in the Atlantic Ocean (44°20′N 8°15′W). Her crew were rescued by the steamship Adria (Italy). Leader was on a voyage from Sunderland, County Durham to Venice, Italy.
Leverington	Canada	The steamship foundered in the Atlantic Ocean. Wreckage came ashore on the Cornish coast.
Lina	Belgium	The ship was driven ashore at Snekkesten, Denmark. She was on a voyage from Riga, Russia to Ghent, East Flanders. She was condemned.
Lindisfarne	United Kingdom	The steamship ran aground in the Sea of Marmara. She was on a voyage from Port Said, Egypt to Constantinople. She was refloated and taken in to Constantinople, where she arrived on 27 March in a severely damaged condition.
Lizzie A. Watson	United States	The ship was wrecked on the Joeflogger. She was on a voyage from Cárdenas, Cuba to Philadelphia, Pennsylvania.
Marie Dickow	Germany	The ship ran aground at Swinemünde.
Maroc, or St. Maroc	France	The steamship struck rocks off Cape Blanco, Morocco and was beached at Mazagan.
Mary and Ann	United Kingdom	The ship foundered. She was on a voyage from Saint John's, Newfoundland Colony to a French port.
Mary Ann Williams	United Kingdom	The ship was driven ashore at Zakynthos, Greece. She was refloated.
Mary Tatham	United Kingdom	The ship struck a rock in the Caramata Passage. She was on a voyage from Cardiff, Glamorgan to Singapore. She completed her voyage on 14 March and was placed under repair.
Mayflower	United Kingdom	The barque was wrecked on the Longsand, in the North Sea off the coast of Essex. Her eleven crew were rescued.
Milan	Flag unknown	The steamship ran aground at Galaţi. She was refloated, ran aground again. Refloated a second time, she ran aground again. She was later refloated and taken in to Galaţi.
Minna	United States	The ship ran aground on the Flindengrund, in the Baltic Sea. She was on a voyage from New York to Danzig, Germany. She was refloated and taken in to Copenhagen, Denmark.
Montrose	United Kingdom	The ship collided with another vessel and sank. She was on a voyage from Ponce, Puerto Rico to New York.
Nations	United Kingdom	The ship was driven ashore in Luggan Bay. She was on a voyage from Londonderry to Irvine, Ayrshire.
Nereide	United Kingdom	The ship was driven ashore near Rixhöft, Germany. She was on a voyage from Danzig to Sunderland. She was refloated and taken in to Gothenburg, Sweden.
Orion	United Kingdom	The barque was abandoned in the Irish Sea 30 nautical miles (56 km) east south east of the Hook Lighthouse, County Wexford before 21 February.
Ormesby	United Kingdom	The schooner was run into by the steamship Cromwell (United Kingdom) and sank 3 nautical miles (5.6 km) off Lowestoft, Suffolk. Her crew were rescued.
Palmerston	United Kingdom	The ship was driven ashore "on Tinicum". She was on a voyage from Philadelphia to Hamburg, Germany.
Phoenix	United Kingdom	The ship struck the Cofar Rock, off the coast of Cornwall and sank. Her crew were rescued. She was on a voyage from Swansea to Portsmouth, Hampshire.
Pola	Austria-Hungary	The ship was driven ashore and wrecked at St. Catherine's, Brazil. She was on a voyage from Cardiff to St. Catherine's.
Prospero	United Kingdom	The ship was wrecked at Nassau, Bahamas. She was on a voyage from London to Nassau.
Rhyddlan Trader	United Kingdom	The ship was driven ashore at Porthdinllaen, Caernarfonshire.
Rona	Netherlands	The ship was driven ashore between South Shields and Sunderland.
Ruby	United Kingdom	The ship ran aground on Navy Island, Ontario, Canada. She was on a voyage from Liverpool to Saint John, New Brunswick, Canada.
San Nicolo	Italy	The ship was wrecked at "Petola". She was on a voyage from Çeşme, Ottoman Empire to Trieste.
Stad Goer	Netherlands	The steamship sprang a leak and sank at Antwerp.
Staffa	United Kingdom	The ship ran aground at "St. Ane". She was refloated and taken in to Guadeloupe, where she was condemned.
St. Svithin	Norway	The ship was wrecked on the Jadder Sandbank, in the North Sea. Her crew were rescued. She was on a voyage from a Dutch port to Norway.
Surprise	United Kingdom	The ship was driven ashore. She was on a voyage from Surinam to Liverpool. She was refloated and put back to Surinam, where she arrived on 21 March in a leaky condition. She was consequently condemned.
Thule	Norway	The ship was abandoned in ice off Grimstad. She was on a voyage from Antwerp to Arendal.
Tuscarora	United States	The ship ran aground on the Turtle Shoal. She was on a voyage from Liverpool to Mobile, Alabama. She was refloated with assistance from the steamship Resolute (United States)and completed her voyage, arriving on 16 March.
Unity	United Kingdom	The schooner struck rocks near the South Bishop Lighthouse, Pembrokeshire and sank. Her crew were rescued. She was on a voyage from Shoreham-by-Sea, Sussex to Western Point, near Liverpool.
Vampyr	Germany	The ship was wrecked in Low Bay. She was on a voyage from London, United Kingdom to Guayaquil, Ecuador.
Vernailles	United States	The ship was driven ashore at Galveston. She was on a voyage from Galveston to Liverpool.
Victoria	United Kingdom	The ship ran aground at Teignmouth, Devon. She was on a voyage from Newcastle upon Tyne to Teignmouth. She was refloated.
Virginie	France	The ship was driven ashore in Algoa Bay. She was later refloated.
Viscount Canning	United Kingdom	The ship was driven ashore at the North Foreland, Kent. She was refloated and towed in to The Downs.
Wilhelmina Helburg	Netherlands	The ship was driven ashore near Molde, Norway. She was on a voyage from Tromsø, Norway to Vlaardingen, South Holland.
Woodman	United Kingdom	The ship was abandoned at sea. She was on a voyage from Pensacola, Florida, United States to Maryport, Cumberland.
Unnamed	United Kingdom	The whaler foundered off Dartmouth, Devon with the loss of all hands.
