= Reigart Bolivar Lowry =

Reigert Bolivar Lowry
- Born: July 14, 1826; La Guaira, Gran Colombia
- Died: November 25, 1880 (aged 54); New York City
- Military career
- Allegiance: United States of America
- Branch: United States Navy
- Service years: 1840–1880
- Rank: Commodore
- Commands: SS George Peabody; USS Underwriter; USS Sciota; USS Severn; New London Naval Station
- Conflicts: Mexican–American War; American Civil War

Commodore Reigert Bolivar Lowry (July 14, 1826 – November 25, 1880) was an officer of the United States Navy.

== Biography ==
Lowry was born La Guaira, Gran Colombia, the son of the U.S. Consul Robert K. Lowry. He was appointed a midshipman on January 21, 1840, (or on January 31), and was promoted to passed midshipman on July 11, 1846. He then served in the Mexican War, and later also took part in Commodore Matthew C. Perry's expedition to Japan in the mid-1850s.

Lowry was promoted to Master on March 1, 1855, and then to lieutenant on September 14 the same year.

At the very start of the Civil War, Lowry was serving aboard the sloop Pawnee, moored in the Potomac River, off Alexandria, Virginia. Early on May 24, 1861, as a force of federal troops from Washington, D.C., approached by land and by gunboat, the captain of Pawnee, Stephen C. Rowan, acting without orders, dispatched Lieutenant Lowry to find the Confederate commander Colonel George H. Terrett and to demand his surrender. Terrett, aware of the hopelessness of his position, promptly ordered his troops to abandon the town, leaving it in Union hands. The only casualty was Elmer E. Ellsworth, colonel of the 11th New York Volunteer Infantry Regiment, who after taking down a Confederate flag flying over the Marshall House Inn, was shot by the owner James W. Jackson.

Lowry commanded the army transport steamship George Peabody, landing troops during the Battle of Hatteras Inlet Batteries in August 1861. He then commanded the gunboat Underwriter from October 1861 until February 1862, and as part of the North Atlantic Blockading Squadron, took part in operations off North Carolina, in November sinking three blockships at the entrance to Ocracoke Inlet, and then in February 1862 capturing enemy fortifications on Roanoke Island, and then taking part in the subsequent capture of Elizabeth City.

Lowry then served as the executive officer of the sloop Brooklyn during the capture of New Orleans in April 1862, and during the first attack on Vicksburg in June. He was promoted to lieutenant commander on July 16, 1862. He then commanded the gunboat Sciota in extensive river operations.

On May 19, 1863, Lowry wrote to the Secretary of the Navy Gideon Welles urging that naval officers and seamen not employed at sea be used to man forts and seacoast defenses, stating that: The most successful defenses made against us – at various points of the Mississippi and the seacoast have been made by ex-naval officers and seamen; in the last defense of Port Hudson the guns were worked by seamen and naval men, so at Vicksburg, at Galveston, and Charleston. The defenses of Sebastopol were entirely defended by Russian seamen for many months, while from the fort guarding that port they beat back the combined fleets of England and France.

After the war, on July 25, 1866, Lowry was promoted to the rank of commander.

On August 27, 1869, Lowry commissioned the wooden screw sloop of war Severn at the New York Navy Yard. In December 1869, Severn was assigned as flagship of the North Atlantic Squadron under Rear Admiral Charles H. Poor. Severn called at Key West in January 1871 before cruising in the West Indies. In April, she investigated alleged mistreatment of the United States consul at Santiago de Cuba, subsequently sailing to Hampton Roads at the end of July. Leaving Hampton Roads in December, Severn sailed to the Boston Navy Yard, decommissioning there on December 31, 1871. Lowry having received another promotion on November 2, 1871, to the rank of captain.

Lowry's last command was the New London Naval Station, having been promoted to commodore on April 1, he shortly thereafter died at the Brooklyn Naval Hospital on November 25, 1880.

The USS Lowry (DD-770), launched on February 6, 1944, was named in his honor. USS Lowry received four battle stars for World War II service and two for Korean War service, and was deployed during the Vietnam War. She was decommissioned in October 1973 and sold to Brazil.
