= Contoocook-class sloop =

American screw sloops

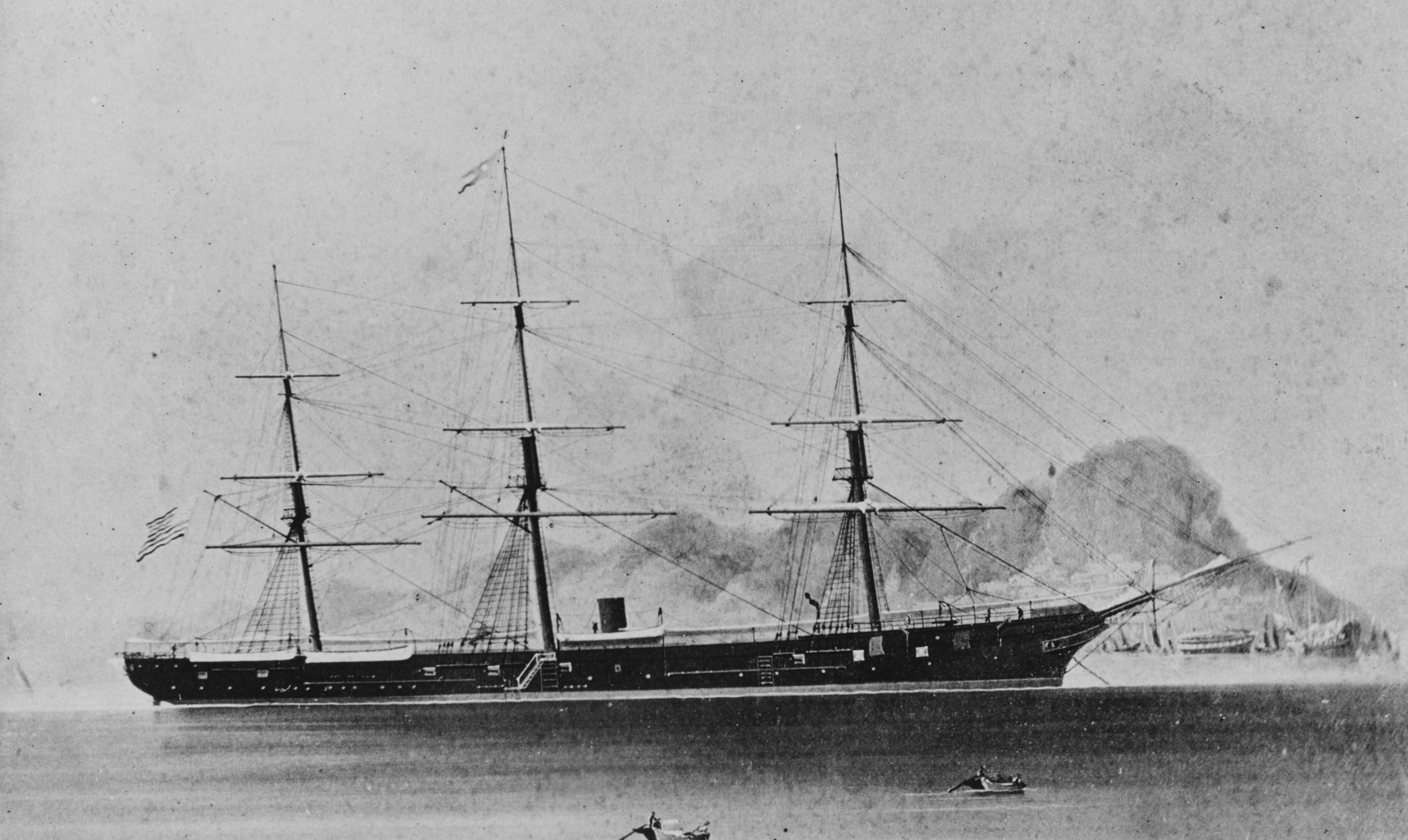
- USS Severn after she was completed as a frigate

Class overview
- Name: Contoocook class
- Builders: Portsmouth Navy Yard; Philadelphia Navy Yard; Brooklyn Navy Yard; Boston Navy Yard
- Operators: United States Navy
- Built: 1863–1868
- In commission: 1868–1879
- Planned: 10
- Completed: 4
- Canceled: 6
- Retired: 4

General characteristics
- Class & type: Screw sloop
- Displacement: 3,100 short tons (2,800 long tons)
- Length: 290 feet (88 m)
- Beam: 41 feet (12 m)
- Draft: 16.7 feet (5.1 m)
- Propulsion: 4 × boilers; 1 × engine; 1 × propeller
- Sail plan: ship rigged
- Speed: 13 knots (24 km/h; 15 mph)
- Complement: 350
- Armament: As planned: 1 × 5.3-inch (13 cm) Parrott rifle; 3 × 12 lb (5.4 kg) howitzers; 14 × 9 in (23 cm) Dahlgren guns

The Contoocook-class was a series of screw sloops operated by the United States Navy following the American Civil War. The ships were designed during the war to serve in a post-war Navy, and were intended to operate as commerce raiders as an economic disincentive to European powers planning a future war. However, they suffered from poor construction quality and had a brief service life during peacetime as the Navy lost funding. Despite an initial ten ships planned, only four were launched and were all decommissioned after a decade in service.

== Development ==
Despite the United Kingdom's official stance of neutrality during the American Civil War, British assets were used to support the rebelling Confederacy, particularly in the development of its navy. Shipyards in Liverpool indiscreetly constructed blockade runners and privateers for the Confederates, exploiting a legal loophole by ensuring the vessels were not armed until they reached Portugal. Among these ships were CSS Alabama, Florida, and Alexandra, which wreaked havoc on Union shipping; Alabama alone was responsible for destroying 65 merchant vessels.

The Union Navy was alarmed by these developments, as the disruption of American trade routes drove up domestic prices, damaged the economy, and forced the reassignment of ships from blockade duties against the South. By 1863, the Union, already provoked by these developments, feared that Britain might intervene to support the Confederates directly - a scenario that would have left the Union Navy hopelessly outmatched by the Royal Navy. Faced with that prospect, the Union Navy began planning for a possible war with the United Kingdom. While the Union fleet could not match the Royal Navy in conventional battles, the plan called for employing tactics similar to those used by the Confederacy: commerce raiding. By using cruisers to launch hit-and-run attacks on British ports and merchant shipping, the Union hoped to make a war too costly for Britain to justify, ultimately forcing it back into neutrality.

For the new role, the Navy developed a breed of warship known as "commerce destroyers" that had the range and speed to intercept enemy ships at sea. Twenty-seven such ships were ordered by Congress in 1863, split into three classes varying in size, speed, and armament. Largest and fastest was the Wampanoag-class frigate, most well armed was the Java-class frigate, and the smallest was the Contoocook-class sloop. The new ships were built according to a new doctrine of the Navy planned for the post-war era. Congress was only interested in a Navy that could directly protect the United States, not one that could rival the Royal or French Navies. Instead of large, costly, ocean-going ironclads such as USS Dunderburg, the legislator wanted the Navy to only consist of coastal ironclads that would protect the shoreline and the commerce destroyers to operate out at sea and deter aggression from said navies.

== Design ==
The Contoocook-class was envisioned as "clipper screw sloops," and featured hulls that were long, narrow, and shallow in an attempt to achieve high speeds. The hulls were designed by John Lenthall and featured a shape similar to the earlier sloops USS Swatara and Quinnebaug. The ships had a length of 290 feet (88 m), beam of 41 feet (12 m), draft of 18 feet (5.5 m), and a displacement of 3,100 short tons (2,800 long tons). The design also featured either one or two funnels and a complement of 350.

The initial design included a cast-metal ram mounted on the stem, although the feature was removed at the end of the Civil War. The main armament initially comprised a broadside of eight 9 in (23 cm) Dahlgren cannons and a 60 pounds (27 kg) Parrott rifled muzzle-loading gun mounted on the foredeck. The engines was designed by Benjamin Isherwood; the power plants featured four main boilers and two superheating boilers that provided steam to two horizontal back action steam 36 in (91 cm) stroke engines, which turned a single propeller. While initially planned to be rigged as barques, the rigging plans on the ships were later altered. The engines alone could produce 12.5 knots (23.2 km/h; 14.4 mph), and speeds up to 14 knots (26 km/h; 16 mph) could be reached with ideal circumstances under both steam and sail. Contoocook's sea trials was a success, and she was praised for stability and handling. In 1875, David Porter described the ships as, "The most efficient kind of ships we have had in the navy, and the model of which for steaming and sailing cannot be surpassed."

== Service history ==
Following the end of the Civil War in 1865, the Navy faced severe funding cuts, which left many projects stalled; the next year, the last six ships of the class were cancelled. Four years later, the Secretary of the Navy disapproved of the large number of warships named after Native American tribes and the incoherent naming conventions used across the fleet. As a result, he ordered a systematic renaming of vessels, which included Contoocook becoming Albany; Mosholu named Severn; and Pushmataha being renamed first to Cambridge and later Congress. The class's wartime construction meant the ships were built out of green wood, which limited their lifespan and usefulness. A post-war commission reviewed the class in 1869, and found that the design was unsatisfactory due to overengineering of the engines and a high length-to-beam ratio; by the next year, both the newly renamed Severn and Albany were decommissioned despite only having recently been completed. The last two ships were out of service by the end of the decade.

== Ships in class ==
Data
Name	Old name	Builder	Laid down	Launched	Commissioned	Decommissioned
Albany	Contoocook	Portsmouth Navy Yard	1863	3 December 1864	14 March 1868	7 January 1870
Congress	Pushmataha, Cambridge	Philadelphia Navy Yard	1863	17 July 1868	4 March 1870	26 July 1876
Severn	Mosholu	Brooklyn Navy Yard	Oct 1864	22 December 1867	27 August 1869	31 December 1871
Worcester	Manitou	Boston Navy Yard	1863	25 August 1865	27 February 1871	1879
Arapaho, Keosauqua, Mondamin, Tahgayuta, Wanalosett and Willamette cancelled in 1866
