= USS Lowry =

Allen M. Sumner-class destroyer

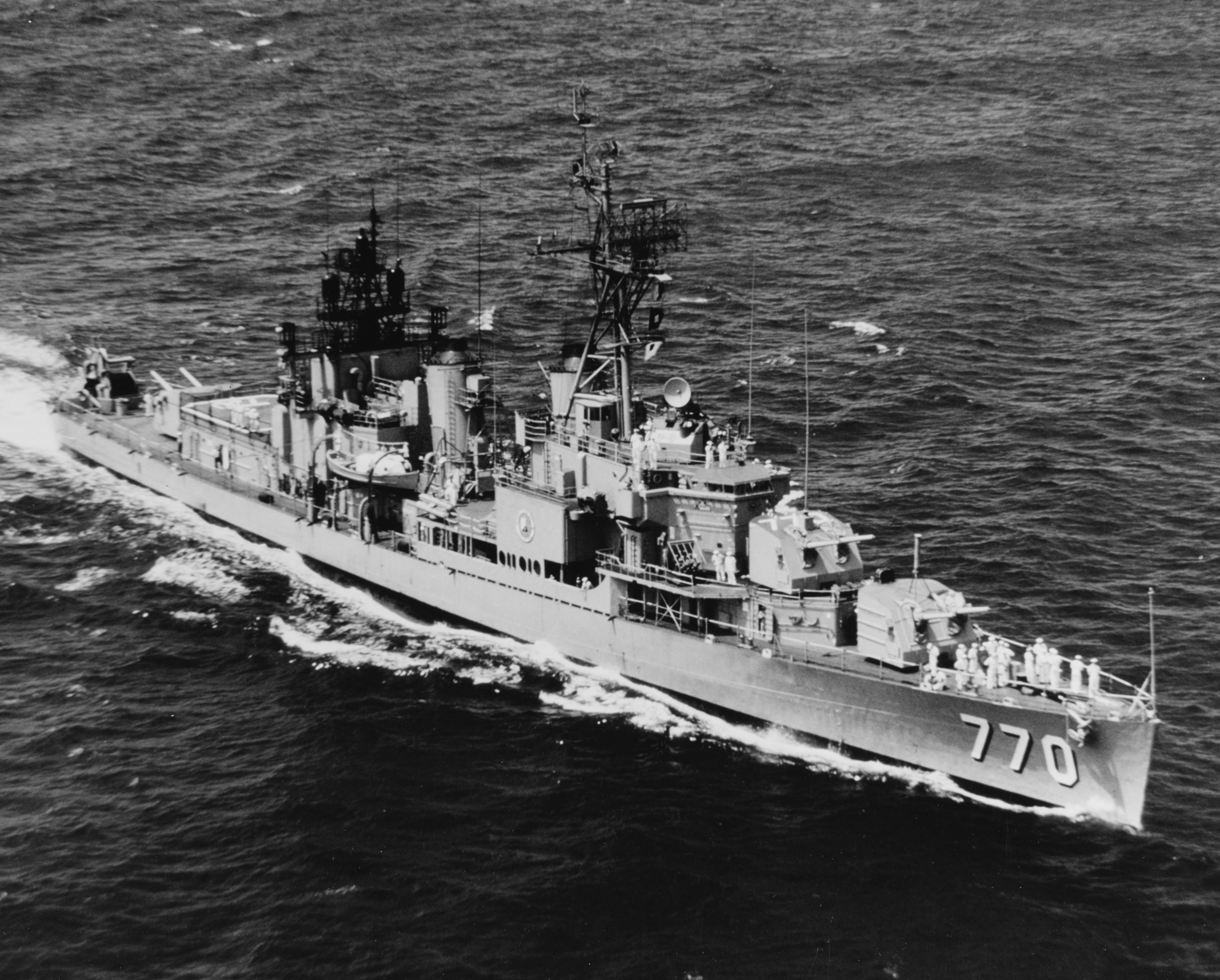
- USS Lowry

History

United States
- Name: Lowry
- Namesake: Reigart Bolivar Lowry
- Builder: Bethlehem Shipbuilding, San Pedro
- Laid down: 1 August 1943
- Launched: 6 February 1944
- Commissioned: 23 July 1944
- Decommissioned: c.1973
- Stricken: 31 October 1973
- Fate: To Brazil 31 October 1973

Brazil
- Name: Espirito Santo
- Stricken: 2 February 1996
- Fate: Scrapped October 1996

General characteristics
- Class & type: Allen M. Sumner-class destroyer
- Displacement: 2,200 tons
- Length: 376 ft 6 in (114.76 m)
- Beam: 40 ft (12 m)
- Draft: 15 ft 8 in (4.78 m)
- Propulsion: 60,000 shp (45,000 kW); 2 propellers
- Speed: 34 knots (63 km/h; 39 mph)
- Range: 6,500 nmi (12,000 km; 7,500 mi) at 15 kn (28 km/h; 17 mph)
- Complement: 336
- Armament: 6 × 5 in (127 mm)/38 cal. guns, 12 × 40 mm AA guns, 11 × 20 mm AA guns, 10 × 21 inch (533 mm) torpedo tubes, 6 × depth charge projectors, 2 × depth charge tracks

USS Lowry (DD-770), an Allen M. Sumner-class destroyer, is the only ship of the United States Navy to be named for Reigart Bolivar Lowry, who served in the Mexican–American War and was a member of Commodore Matthew C. Perry's expedition to Japan in 1855. He served with distinction in the American Civil War, capturing New Orleans and in the first attack on Vicksburg (April–June 1862).

Lowry was laid down on 1 August 1943 by Bethlehem Shipbuilding, San Pedro, California and launched on 6 February 1944; sponsored by Miss Ann Lowry. The ship was commissioned on 23 July 1944.

== Service history ==
=== World War II ===
Lowry cleared San Pedro 26 October 1944 for training at Pearl Harbor and arrived San Pedro Bay on 14 December. From 19 to 29 December she escorted convoys between Leyte and the Mindoro Island beachhead, and was also part of a special striking force that helped protect Mindoro from enemy attack. From 2 to 10 January 1945 she operated as an effective task force screen and gunfire support ship in the invasion of Luzon, then patrolled the approaches to Lingayen Gulf guarding the newly won beachhead until sailing for Ulithi on 22 January.

The destroyer departed Ulithi on 10 February to screen fast carrier Task Force (TF) 58 for air strikes against Honshū in support of the Invasion of Iwo Jima. The force returned to Ulithi on 1 March, from which Lowry sailed on 21 March for Okinawa to screen the support carrier group for the invasion until 29 April. Lowry then served as a radar picket off Okinawa. During this assignment, the ship engaged in numerous actions with enemy aircraft. The heaviest of these occurred on 28 May, when accompanying picket destroyer Drexler was hit by two kamikazes and sank with heavy loss of life. Lowry, after fighting to prevent the loss of her companion, stood by to rescue survivors despite the continued presence of enemy aircraft in the area. From 29 June she covered minesweeping operations in the South China Sea, then arrived San Pedro Bay on 27 July. For her work as radar picket she was awarded the Navy Unit Commendation.

Lowry joined fast carrier TF 38 off Tokyo 24 August for occupation duty during which she furnished food to Allied prisoners of war until 1 October, when she sailed for Okinawa to embark passengers for the United States. Arrived at San Diego on 21 October for overhaul and west coast training.

Lowry left San Francisco 14 July 1946 for Kwajalein to patrol during Operation Crossroads, the Bikini atomic bomb tests. She was on station from 24 July to 10 August, when she sailed for San Diego, arriving 22 August.

Training off the west coast and in the Hawaiian Islands was broken in May 1947 when she visited Sydney, Australia, for the anniversary of the Battle of the Coral Sea. Returning to San Diego 14 June, she decommissioned 30 June 1947 and entered the Pacific Reserve Fleet.

=== Korea ===
Lowry recommissioned on 27 December 1950. Assigned to the Atlantic Fleet, she arrived New York on 30 April 1951, was overhauled at Norfolk, and in August began training exercises in the Caribbean, returning to Norfolk 15 November. On 22 January 1952, Lowry sailed, via the Panama Canal, to join the 7th Fleet, arriving at Yokosuka on 27 February. With TF 77, Lowry served off the east coast of Korea on shore bombardment, plane guard, and screening duty until early April, then had similar duty off the west coast of Korea with TF 95, the United Nations Blockading and Escort Force, through May. On 8 June, she sailed to rejoin TF 77 for gunstrike missions. Sailing via the Suez Canal and the principal Mediterranean ports, Lowry arrived at Norfolk, Virginia on 19 August.

Between 19 August 1952 and 1 February 1954, Lowry made training cruises to the Caribbean and off Florida, engaging in intensive exercises to increase her combat efficiency. She departed Norfolk on 1 February for her second world cruise, arriving at Naval Base Yokosuka, Japan from the Panama Canal on 9 March. After a number of simulated combat exercises, including a full‑scale mock invasion of Iwo Jima, she left Yokosuka on 29 June for Suez, completing her second circumnavigation at Naval Station Norfolk, Virginia on 25 August.

Training along the coast and in the Caribbean prepared Lowry for her first deployment with the 6th Fleet in the Mediterranean, for which she left Norfolk 7 November 1956, returning to Norfolk 28 February 1957 for renewed training and overhaul. She again left Norfolk 3 September for NATO "Strikeback" exercises in the North Atlantic, continuing on to the Mediterranean from which she returned to Norfolk 22 December.

Her third tour with the 6th Fleet, 7 August 1959 to 26 February 1960, was followed by a FRAM II overhaul at Portsmouth Naval Shipyard, completed 14 January 1961.

In June 1961, Lowry joined Antisubmarine Warfare Task Group Alpha, a special force engaged in research and development. She served in this force for the major part of the next 4 years, which included such operations as the recovery of NASA Astronaut Virgil Grissom successfully completing the second American crewed space flight on 21 July 1961 (Mercury-Redstone 4 / Liberty Bell 7), and the Naval Quarantine of Cuba which played the major role in ending the Cuban Missile Crisis of October–November 1962.

=== Vietnam ===
After her fourth Mediterranean deployment, 18 February 1965 to 12 July, Lowry had the DASH system installed, then participated in a large Atlantic Fleet operational exercise. Her 1966 6th Fleet deployment, 4 March to 12 August, was followed by duty as schoolship for the Fleet Sonar School, Key West. Through most of January and February 1967, Lowry embarked several Peruvian midshipmen for training under the Midshipmen Exchange Program. From 8 May through 22 September she underwent regular overhaul at Norfolk Naval Shipyard, followed by refresher training out of the Fleet Training Center, Naval Station Guantanamo Bay, Cuba.

Lowry departed Norfolk early in April 1968, passing thru the Panama Canal on Easter Sunday, then continuing for the Far East on her first 7th Fleet deployment of the Vietnam War. Serving off the coast, she performed plane guard, naval gunfire support, and other duties for which the versatile destroyer was well suited. Highlights of port visits were visits to: Bangkok, Thailand; Sasebo and Yokosuka Japan; Hong Kong; Pusan, Korea; and the Philippines. Lowlights included a collision at sea while highlining, and monsoon seas with one of two screws non-functional. She arrived back at Norfolk on 27 November, then continued Atlantic coast operations into 1969.

On 29 May 1969 a forward gun turret exploded during regular sea operations near Puerto Rico. During gunnery practice, a shell detonated inside the barrel, blowing most of the barrel over the side and into the ocean. One man inside the gun mount was killed and several were injured.

Lowry received four battle stars for World War II service and two for Korean service.

== Brazilian service ==
Lowry was struck from the Naval Registry on 31 October 1973 and transferred to the Brazilian Navy on the same day. She was renamed Espirito Santo (Holy Spirit) and remained in Brazilian service until she was struck from service on 2 February 1996, used as target practice, and ultimately sunk in 1998. Other sources indicate the ship was scrapped October 1996.
