= CSS Alexandra =

Very strong british wooden steamer built in the late 19th century

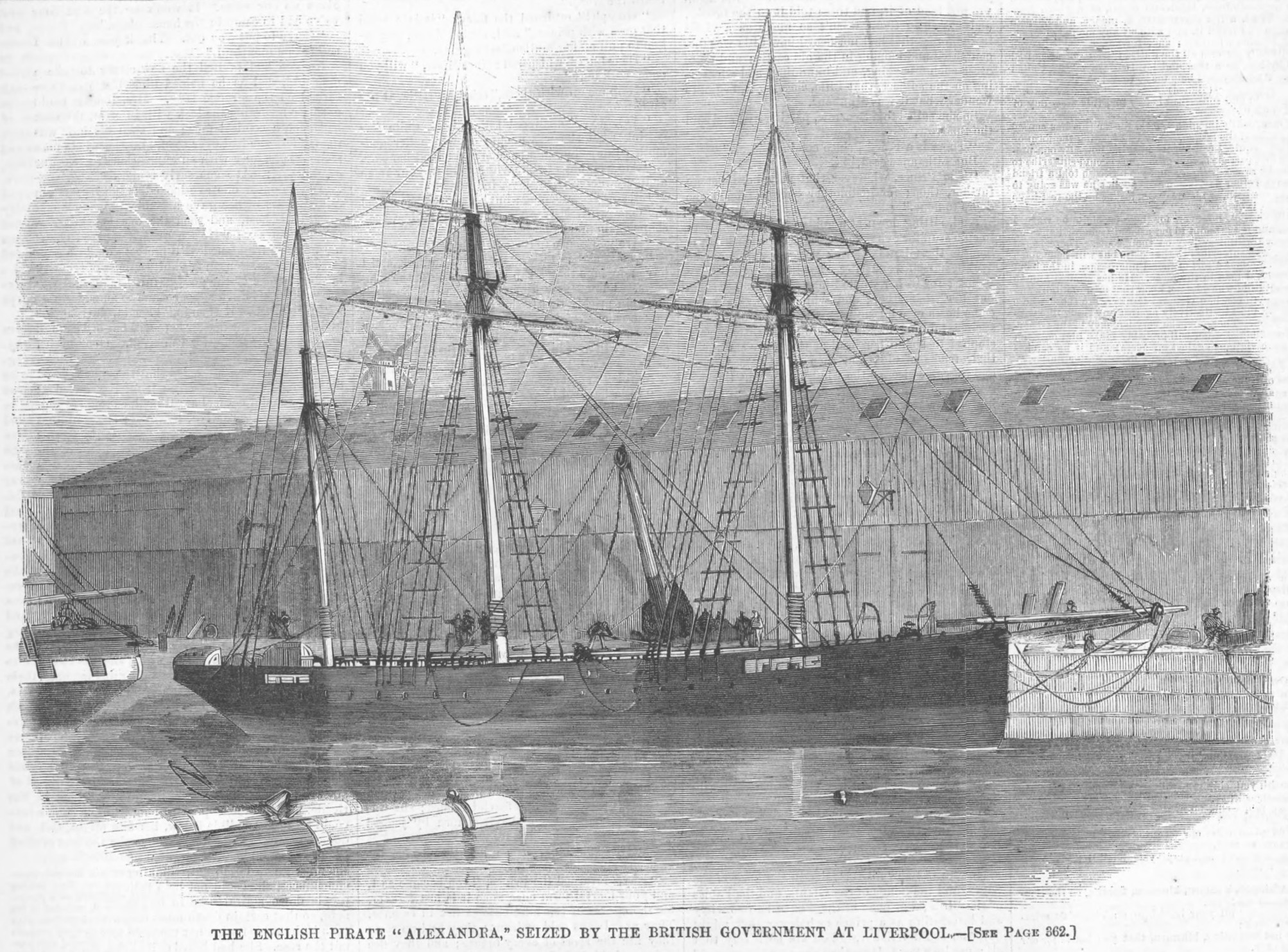
- CSS Alexandra seized by the British government at Liverpool.

History

Confederate States
- Name: CSS Alexandra
- Fate: Seized by British government at Liverpool.

General characteristics
- Type: Cruiser
- Displacement: 124 tons.
- Propulsion: Steam engine

CSS Alexandra, a prospective cruiser, was a barque-rigged, very strong, wooden steamer with "rakish masts, round stern, very straight stem." Built in the United Kingdom by William C. Miller & Sons, Liverpool, to the order of Charles K. Prioleau of Fraser, Trenholm & Co., the Liverpool firm with Charleston roots whose partner, George A. Trenholm, was the able Confederate Secretary of the Treasury, Alexandra was built through the agency of Fawcett, Preston & Co. She quickly became a cause celebre in testing British policy toward Confederate building in British shipyards to fight the United States at sea.

== History ==
Alexandra was intended to be a gift from the Trenholm firm to the Confederacy. Commander Bulloch to Secretary Mallory, 30 June 1863, explains: "The gunboat presented to the Confederate Government by Messrs. Fraser, Trenholm & Co. happened to be launched on the day, the present Princess of Wales entered London, and in compliment or in commemoration of that event, was named Alexandra . . . while the Alexandra was fitting in the Toxtetle dock, the customs officer of this port seized her in obedience to orders from London" on 5 April under the "Foreign Enlistment Act." Bulloch continues bitterly, "-such was the apparent haste of the British authorities to carry out the wishes of the American minister that the seizure was effected on Sunday. The Alexandra . . . was still the actual property of the contractors, Messrs. Fawcett, Preston & Co-.but the British authorities showed a further disposition to favor the United States through its officials here by causing the ship to be 'exchequered,' a proceeding by which there would be indefinite delay in obtaining the release of the ship, even if she should not be condemned, and by which the Government, even though it failed to prove its case, would debar the defendants from any right or claim for damages or costs. The trial resulted in favor of the defendants . . . but this ship is still held pending the issue of the attorney-general's 'bill of exceptions,' which cannot be argued until November." Meanwhile the Russians had made overtures to buy her at a bargain from Comdr. James H. North, CSN, in Britain. That the Confederacy still had friends in high places is shown by North to Mallory, 3 July: "Judging from the speech of Sir Hugh Cairns and the charge of the Lord Chief Baron to the jury, anyone has a right to buy arms and build ships." Litigation dragged on while all Confederate shipbuilding in Britain marked time awaiting the decision. Agents such as Bulloch, North et al. shifted their sights increasingly to France not only as a source of ships but of new "owners" and "fences" for the hulls building in Britain "as a probable and very plausible means of security." Alexandra was not released for a full year; by May 1864 seizure of the Laird rams the previous October was ancient history and a scapegoat had been discovered in Clarence R. Yonge, a deserter from CSS Alabama who had turned informer. The new political climate must have ended hope of using Alexandra as a commerce destroyer. In the meantime, she had become Mary of Liverpool, ostensibly a peaceful merchant vessel owned by Henry Lafone, another secret agent of the Confederacy. U.S. Consul Thomas H. Dudley, not deceived, reported to London, 10 July: "Alexandra has had her insides taken out and houses put up on her decks and has sailed." He thought she would be armed in Bermuda or Nassau, but there is no evidence she ever was. Consul M. M. Jackson at Halifax telegraphed Secretary Seward, 9 September: "Steamer Mary, formerly Alexandra ... is now at Liverpool, Nova Scotia, and carries, as is reported, 4 guns." She had arrived that night in ballast from Bermuda with a crew of 24. The U.S. Consul in Nassau on 16 November remarked she was a "very slow boat," 8 days Halifax-Nassau. But her slow passage did not deter the United States from arranging to have her libeled at Nassau, 13 December 1864, and Mary was not released again until after war's end, 30 May 1865.
