= USS Severn (1867) =

American steam frigate

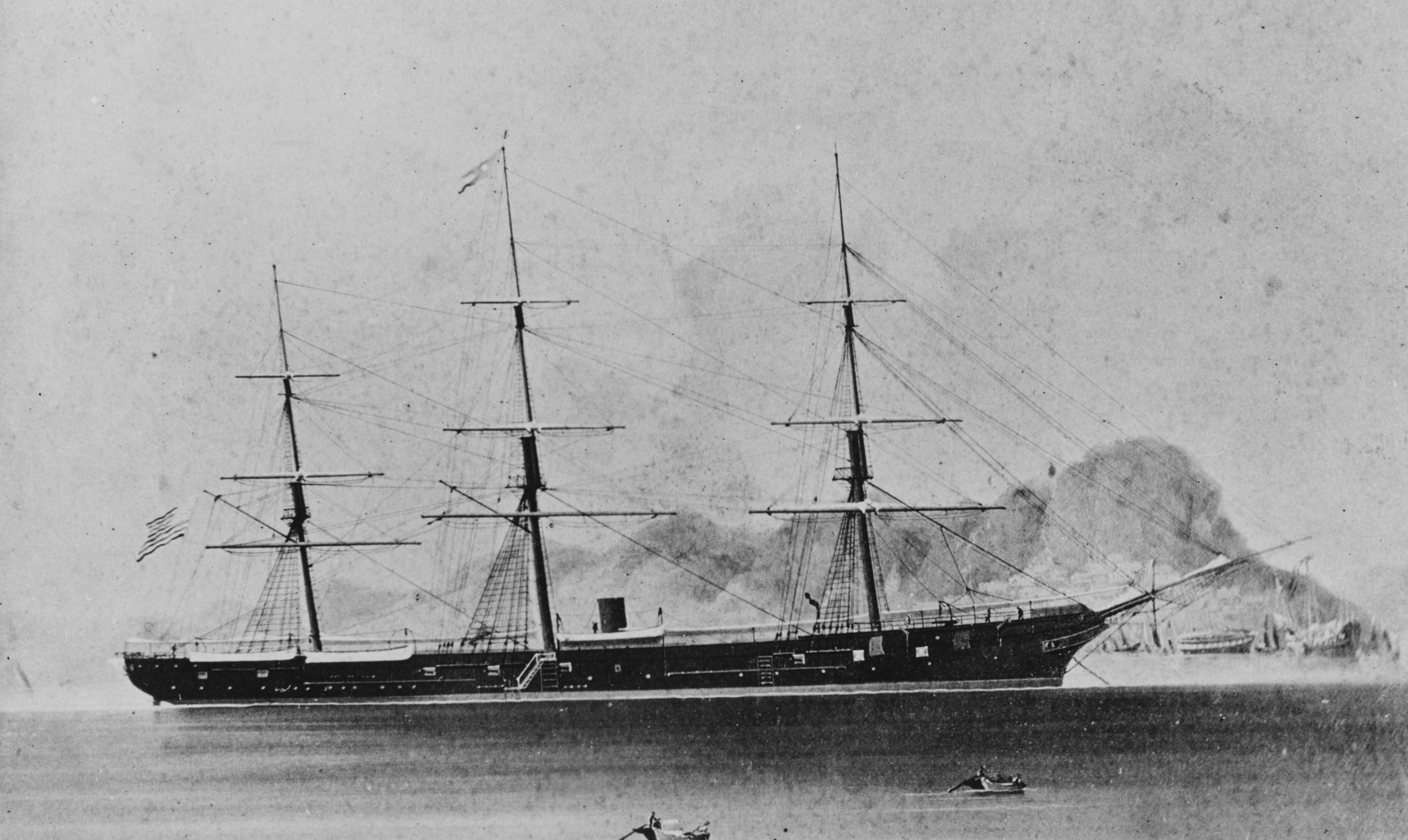
- Abeam view of USS Severn at an unknown date

History

United States
- Name: Mosholu (1869); Severn (1869-1877)
- Builder: New York Navy Yard
- Laid down: October 1864
- Launched: 22 December 1867
- Commissioned: 27 August 1869
- Decommissioned: 31 December 1871
- Fate: Sold for breaking, 1877

General characteristics
- Class & type: Contoocook-class frigate
- Displacement: 3,003 short tons (2,681 long tons)
- Length: 296 feet 10 inches (90.47 m)
- Beam: 41 feet (12 m)
- Depth: 13 feet 3 inches (4.04 m)
- Propulsion: 6 × boilers; 2 × expansion steam engine; 1 × screw
- Complement: 250
- Armament: 14 × 9 in (23 cm) Dahlgren guns; 1 × 60 lb (27 kg) Parrott rifle

USS Severn was a Contoocook-class frigate of the United States Navy. She was laid down as Mosholu during the American Civil War to deter British intervention in 1864, although timber shortages and a rushed construction delayed progress. While intended as a sloop, modifications while under construction enlarged her armament and converted her into a frigate. Renamed and launched in 1869, her design was criticized and green wood limited her service life. After a brief two-year stint in the Atlantic and Caribbean, she was decommissioned in 1871. In 1877, she was sold and broken up as part of a scheme to fund the construction of USS Puritan.

== Development ==
During the American Civil War, the Confederate States used British-built privateers to hamper Union trade instead of directly challenging the Union Navy. One such privateer, CSS Alabama, was responsible for destroying 65 merchant vessels. The disruption of Union trade routes drove up domestic prices, damaged the economy, and forced the reassignment of ships from blockade duties against the South. The United States feared that the United Kingdom would directly intervene to support the Confederacy—a scenario that would have left the Union Navy outmatched by the Royal Navy. In response, the Union Navy began planning for a possible war. While the American fleet could not match the British in conventional battles, the plan called for employing tactics similar to those used by the Confederacy: commerce raiding. By using cruisers to launch hit-and-run attacks on British ports and merchant shipping, the Union hoped to make a war too costly for Britain to justify, ultimately forcing it back into neutrality.

For the new role, the Navy developed "commerce destroyers" that had the range and speed to intercept enemy ships at sea. Twenty-seven such ships were ordered by Congress in 1863, split into three classes varying in size, speed, and armament. The smallest of these designs became known as the Contoocook-class sloop. By 1864, the new ships were built according to a new doctrine of the Navy for the post-war era. Congress was only interested in a navy that could directly protect the United States, not one that could rival the Royal or French Navies. Instead of large, costly, ocean-going ironclads such as USS Dunderburg, the legislators wanted the Navy to only consist of coastal ironclads that would protect the shoreline and commerce destroyers to operate out at sea and deter aggression from foreign nations.

== Design ==
The Contoocook-class hulls were long, narrow, and shallow in an attempt to achieve high speeds. Severn had a beam of 41 feet (12 m), depth of 13 feet 3 inches (4.04 m), was 296 feet 10 inches (90.47 m) long at the gun deck, had a displacement of 3,003 short tons (2,681 long tons), and a crew of 250. Severn was equipped with four main boilers and two superheating boilers that provided steam to two horizontal back action steam 36 in (91 cm) stroke engines, which turned a single propeller. Combined with ship-rigged sails, she could reach a speed of about 13 knots (24 km/h; 15 mph). Armament consisted of a broadside of fourteen 9 in (23 cm) Dahlgren cannons and a 60 lb (27 kg) Parrott rifled muzzle-loading gun on the foredeck when she was commissioned.

== Service history ==
In October 1864, her keel was laid down at the New York Navy Yard, and she was launched on 22 December 1867. Like many other shipbuilding projects during the war, construction was rushed to get ships into service as soon as possible. A shortage of seasoned timber led to the class built out of heterogeneous green timber, which shortened the ships' service lives. As shortages continued after the war ended, ships were left half-built in the yards for years in an attempt to season the wood. Green, or undried, timber was undesirable as it had a tendency to rapidly shrink, rot, and leave a ship in need of uneconomic repair.

The sloop was initially named Mosholu, after a town in New York. However, Secretary of the Navy Adolph Borie disapproved of warships with Native American-sounding names and the unclear conventions used across the fleet. As a result, he ordered a systematic renaming of vessels. On 15 May 1869, she was renamed Severn, after the Severn River in Maryland, before she was commissioned on 27 August 1869. That year, a post-war audit inspected the ship; she was criticized as being too narrow and having an unnecessary amount of machinery. While a spar deck was added and the rigging altered, neither issue was ultimately addressed. The addition of the spar deck allowed an additional six cannons added to the broadside, as the design was initially only to be armed with nine. After the modifications, the ship was considered a frigate.

Severn was finally completed in December 1869, and her first assignment was to serve as the flagship of the North Atlantic Squadron. In early 1871, she was reassigned to the Caribbean and investigated concerns that the US consul to Santiago de Cuba was mistreated. On 31 December, she arrived in Boston for repairs and was decommissioned. Work was complete by 1875, but she was never recommissioned. Two years later, she was brought to New York City and sold to John Roach on 2 March 1877 to partially compensate him for work on the ironclad USS Puritan. The exchange was a part of a scheme to pay for a new Puritan without Congressional knowledge. The old monitor was neglected and Congress was only willing to fund repairs, not a new ship. Roach had the old frigate broken up, and proceeds along with intended congressional funds financed the new Puritan.

== Sources ==
=== Print ===
- Canney, Donald L. (1990). The Old Steam Navy Volume 1: Frigates, Sloops and Gunboats, 1815–1885. Naval Institute Press. ISBN 978-0870210044.
- Caiella, J.M. (April 2016). "The Wampanoag: 'Germ Idea' of the Battlecruiser". Naval History. 30 (2). ISSN 1042-1920.
- Campbell, N. J. M. (1979). "United States". In Chesneau, Roger; Kolesnik, Eugene M. (eds.). Conway's All the World's Fighting Ships, 1860–1905. New York City: Mayflower Books. pp. 114–169. ISBN 978-0-8317-0302-8.
- Kinnaman, Stephen Chapin (2022). John Lenthall: The Life of a Naval Constructor. Vernon Press. ISBN 978-1-64889-437-4.
- Official Records of the Union and Confederate Navies in the War of the Rebellion. United States Naval War Records. U.S. Government Printing Office. 1921.
- Sloan, III, Edward W. (1965). "Isherwood's Masterpiece". Proceedings of the United States Naval Institute. 91 (12).
- Small, Stephen C. (August 2002). "The Wampanoag Goes on Trial". Naval History. 16 (4). United States Naval Institute. ISSN 1042-1920.

=== Online ===
- "Mosholu". www.history.navy.mil. Dictionary of American Fighting Ships.
- "Puritan I (Mon)". www.history.navy.mil. Dictionary of American Fighting Ships.
- Quarstein, John V. (2021-08-21). "Roll, Alabama, Roll! - Sinking of CSS Alabama". Mariners' Museum and Park. Archived from the original on June 23, 2024.
- Evans, Mark L (21 September 2017). "Severn I (Screw Sloop)". www.history.navy.mil. Dictionary of American Fighting Ships. Archived from the original on 2024-05-25.
- "Supplying Warships · Liverpool's Abercromby Square and the Confederacy During the U.S. Civil War ·". ldhi.library.cofc.edu. Lowcountry Digital History Initiative. Archived from the original on July 19, 2024.
- "The Evolution of Ship Naming in the U.S. Navy". Naval History and Heritage Command. Archived from the original on 10 Feb 2025.
- LaGrone, Sam (3 June 2025). "SECNAV Tasked to Rename USNS Harvey Milk; Report Says Other Ship Renamings Under Consideration". USNI News.
