= Proceedings (magazine) =

American sea services magazine

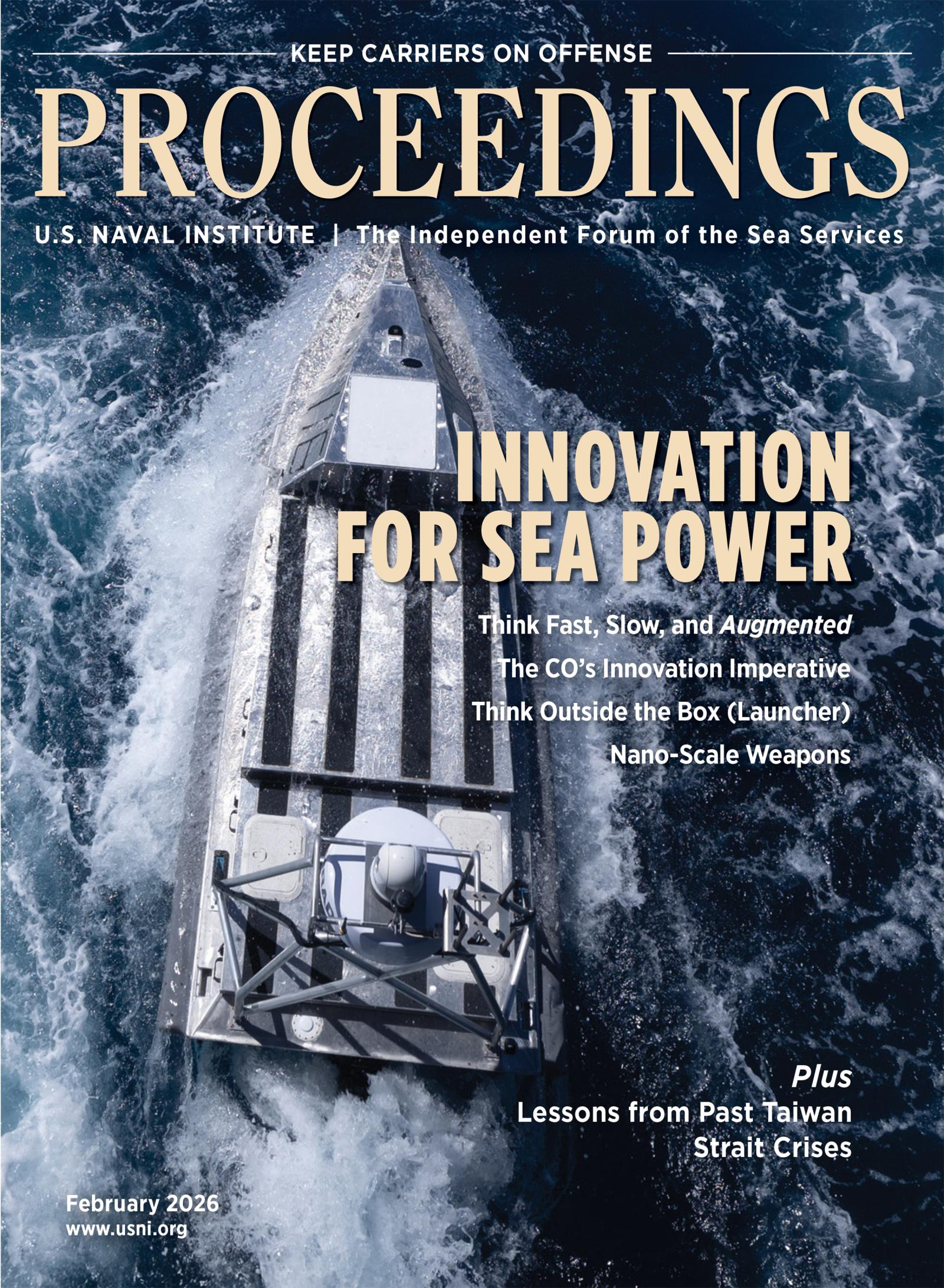
- Proceedings February 2026 Vol. 152/2/1,476
- Editor-in-Chief: Capt. Bill Hamblet, USN (Ret.)
- Frequency: Monthly
- Publisher: Rear Admiral Ray Spicer, USN (Ret.)
- First issue: 1874
- Company: U.S. Naval Institute
- Country: United States
- Based in: U.S. Naval Academy, Annapolis, Maryland
- Language: English
- Website: www.usni.org/magazines/proceedings/
- ISSN: 0041-798X

Proceedings is a monthly print magazine published by the U.S. Naval Institute. Most issues are 96 pages in print and are also published online, along with regular online-only content. Launched in 1874, it is one of the oldest continuously published magazines in the United States. In accordance with the Naval Institute's mission, Proceedings exists to advance the professional, literary, and scientific understanding of sea power and other issues critical to global security. Most Proceedings content focuses on the U.S. Navy, Marine Corps, and Coast Guard, but there are contributions from allied navies and the broader joint force. Most articles are contributed by military professionals and civilian experts. Topics range from strategy to tactics to leadership and technology. Proceedings frequently carries feature articles top leaders of the Navy, Marine Corps and Coast Guard.

== Notable contributors ==
Over the decades many notable names have contributed articles to Proceedings either early in their careers or when they reached the upper echelons of leadership, and in many cases, both.

- Tom Clancy, best-selling author of techno-thrillers such as The Hunt for Red October
- George Dewey, only officer in U.S. history to attain the rank of Admiral of the Navy
- Ernest King, Chief of Naval Operations (CNO) during World War II
- Alfred Thayer Mahan, U.S. Navy flag officer, geostrategist and historian
- Chester W. Nimitz, Commander in Chief, Pacific Ocean Areas (CinCPOA), for U.S. and Allied air, land, and sea forces during World War II
- Theodore Roosevelt, 26th President of the United States
- James G. Stavridis, NATO's 16th Supreme Allied Commander Europe
- Yates Stirling Jr., U.S. Navy flag officer, author, submarine pioneer and first commander of Naval Submarine Base New London and Submarine School
- James A. Winnefeld Jr., Navy admiral and former Vice Chairman of the Joint Chiefs of Staff

== See also ==
- American Political Science Review
- Naval War College Review
- Naval Review (magazine)
