= Green wood =

Wood that still retains internal moisture

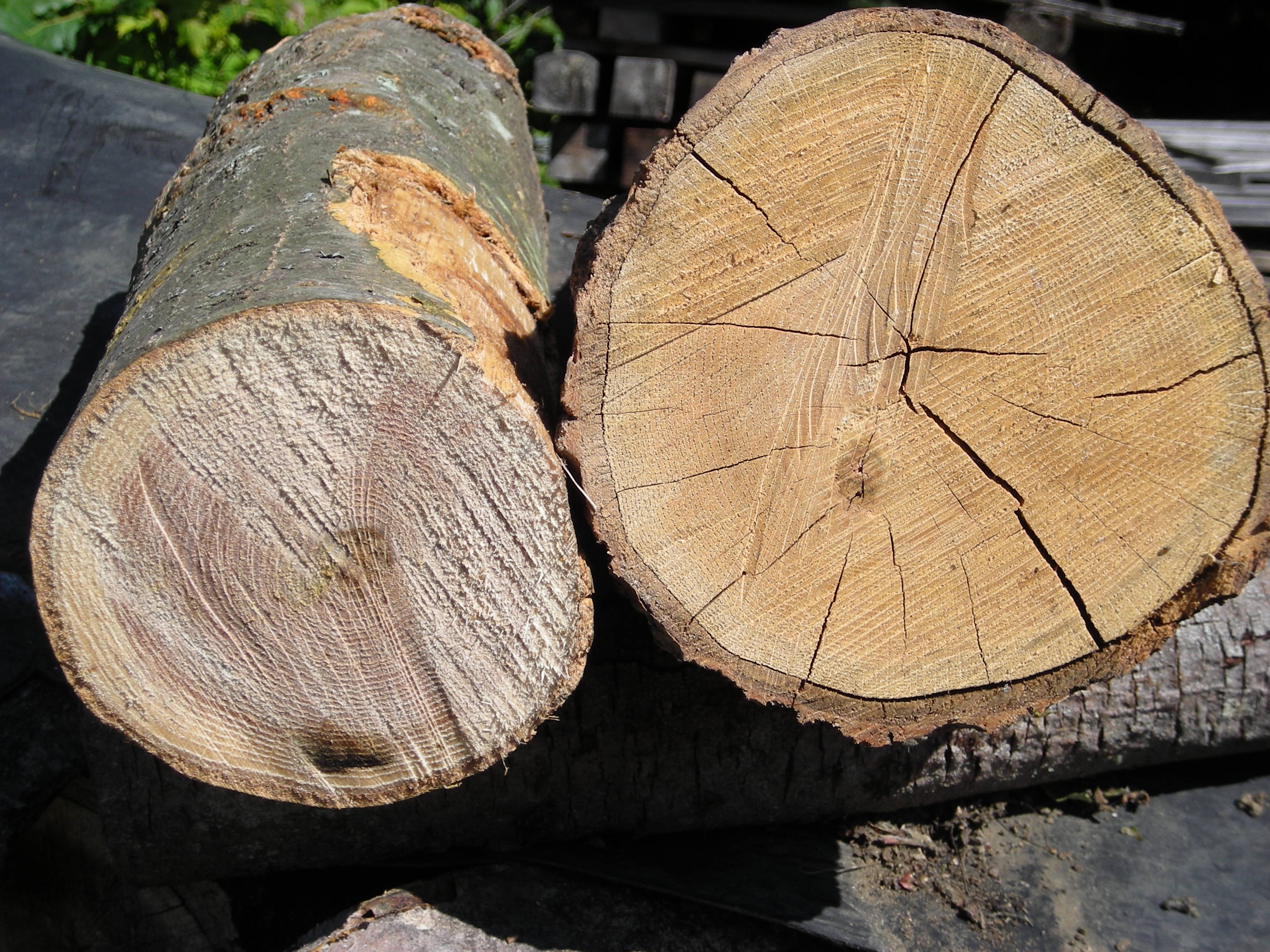
Green on left, seasoned on right

Green wood is wood that has been recently cut and therefore has not had an opportunity to season (dry) by evaporation of the internal moisture. Green wood contains more moisture than seasoned wood, which has been dried through passage of time or by forced drying in kilns. Green wood is considered to have 100% moisture content relative to air-dried or seasoned wood, which is considered to be 20%.

Energy density charts for wood fuels tend to use air dried wood as their reference, thus oven dried or 0% moisture content can reflect 103.4% energy content.

== Combustion ==
When green wood is used as fuel in appliances it releases less heat per unit of measure (usually cords or tons) because of the heat consumed to evaporate the moisture. Used for grilling and smoking meat, it can impart the meat with an unpleasant flavor. The lower temperatures that result can lead to more creosote being created which is later deposited in exhaust flues. These deposits can later be ignited when sufficient heat and oxygen are present to cause a chimney fire, which can be destructive and dangerous.

== Green lumber ==
Green lumber presents its own characteristics as well. Some species of wood are better assembled green because wood splits less when nailed green. Other species shrink excessively, leaving voids between the individual pieces when allowed to dry. Often wood to be used for fine products, such as furniture, is kiln dried to stabilize it and minimise the shrinkage of the finished product.

== See also ==
- Green woodworking
- Bodging
