= Lee Creek =

Lee Creek, Lee's Creek and Lees Creek may refer to:

== Streams ==
In the United States

- Lee Creek (Arkansas), a creek in Arkansas and Oklahoma
- Lee Creek (Nevada), a stream in Nevada
- Lees Creek (Ohio), a creek in Ohio
- Lees Creek (Lackawanna River tributary), in Lackawanna County, Pennsylvania
- historical name of Nanticoke Creek, Pennsylvania
- Lee Creek (Ohio River), a stream in West Virginia

Elsewhere

- Lee Creek (New South Wales), a creek in Australia

== Populated places ==
In the United States

- Lee Creek, Arkansas, an unincorporated community
- Lee's Creek Township, Washington County, Arkansas
- Lees Creek, Ohio, an unincorporated community
- Lee Creek, West Virginia, an unincorporated community

== Other ==
- Lee Creek Bridge (disambiguation)
- Lee's Creek Covered Bridge, near Dover, Kentucky, USA
- Lee Creek Snowshoe Cabin, in Glacier National Park, Montana, USA
