= List of shipwrecks in 1896 =

The list of shipwrecks in 1896 includes ships sunk, foundered, grounded, or otherwise lost during 1896.

table of contents
1896
Jan	Feb	Mar	Apr
May	Jun	Jul	Aug
Sep	Oct	Nov	Dec
Unknown date

== January ==
=== 1 January ===
List of shipwrecks: 1 January 1896
Ship	State	Description
Ealing	United Kingdom	The ship ran aground off Isaacs Harbour, Nova Scotia, Canada, with the loss of eighteen of her 27 crew. She was on a voyage from Pelley Island, Newfoundland to New York, United States.
Salina	United States	The steamer caught fire in the St. Clair River three miles (4.8 km) below Marine City, Michigan and burned to the water's edge.

=== 3 January ===
List of shipwrecks: 3 January 1896
Ship	State	Description
O. R. Whitney	United States	The steamer was sunk in a collision with Emily A. Foote at Norfolk, Virginia.

=== 4 January ===
List of shipwrecks: 4 January 1896
Ship	State	Description
Chevy Chase	United Kingdom	The ship was in collision with Rathlin (United Kingdom) in the River Thames at Woolwich, London and was damaged. She was on a voyage from Christiania, Norway to London. She was consequently condemned and scrapped.

=== 5 January ===
List of shipwrecks: 5 January 1896
Ship	State	Description
Chesapeake	United States	The laid up steamer was destroyed by fire at dock in Bordentown, New Jersey.
Mary Blue	United States	The steamer struck a snag and sank near Liverpool, Florida. Later raised.

=== 6 January ===
List of shipwrecks: 6 January 1896
Ship	State	Description
Emperor of St. John	Canada	The ship was driven ashore and severely damaged south of Cape George, Nova Scotia. She was on a voyage from Montreal, Quebec, to Guysborough, Nova Scotia.

=== 8 January ===
List of shipwrecks: 8 January 1896
Ship	State	Description
William H. Cowper	United States	The canal boat sank between Jersey City, New Jersey and New York City, possibly by ice.

=== 10 January ===
List of shipwrecks: 10 January 1896
Ship	State	Description
Josie	United States	The steamer was sunk in a collision with L. E. Patton (United States) in the Mississippi River 40 miles (64 km) below Memphis, Tennessee. Later raised. A fireman on L. E. Patton was fatally scalded f

=== 12 January ===
List of shipwrecks: 12 January 1896
Ship	State	Description
Congo	United States	The steamer was sunk in a collision with a barge in the Mississippi River while backing out of a dock at Caruthersville, Missouri, a total loss. Four crewmen killed.
Royal	United States	The passenger steamer laid up by the bank caught fire, burned to the waterline and sank one mile (1.6 km) above Evansville, Indiana.

=== 13 January ===
List of shipwrecks: 13 January 1896
Ship	State	Description
Fortuna	United States	The fishing schooner was run down and sunk off Cape Cod by Barnstable. Nine crewmen killed.

=== 15 January ===
List of shipwrecks: 15 January 1896
Ship	State	Description
Danube	United States	The steamer was blown ashore in a gale, probably in the New Orleans, Louisiana area, sprung a leak but saved from sinking by throwing cargo overboard.

=== 16 January ===
List of shipwrecks: 16 January 1896
Ship	State	Description
General Hancock	United States	The schooner was sunk in a collision with Chesapeake (United States) in Chesapeake Bay near Smith's Point Light.

=== 24 January ===
List of shipwrecks: 24 January 1896
Ship	State	Description
Blanks Cornwell	United States	The steamer struck a snag and sank in the Tallahatchie River, a total loss.

=== 26 January ===
List of shipwrecks: 26 January 1896
Ship	State	Description
Ellen	Queensland	The vessel was wrecked in the harbour of Townsville, Australia.

== February ==
=== 1 February ===
List of shipwrecks: 1 February 1896
Ship	State	Description
New Crescent	United States	The passenger steamer struck an obstruction and sank in the Cumberland River in six feet (1.8 m) of water, a total loss.

=== 5 February ===
List of shipwrecks: 5 February 1896
Ship	State	Description
Cricket	United States	The steamer broke loose from her moorings at Everett, Washington and went on the beach. Two hours later she burned, a total loss.
Mary Potter	United States	The schooner was beached six miles (9.7 km) east of the East Pass of St. Andrew's Bay, Florida.

=== 6 February ===
List of shipwrecks: 6 February 1896
Ship	State	Description
City of Norwich	United States	The barge, after being cut loose in a gale by her tow boat Thomas J. Scully (United States), was able to anchor near the Cornfield Lightship, but sank the next day.
Cornelia	United States	The laid up tugboat sunk overnight at dock in Perth Amboy, New Jersey during a storm.
Greenwich	United States	The steamer was sunk in a collision with Gypsum (United States) off Sailor's Snug Harbor, New York due to poor visibility from heavy smoke blowing from the New Jersey shore.
Wamsutta	United States	The barge, after being cut loose in a gale by her tow boat Thomas J. Scully (United States), drifted onto the Saybrook, Connecticut breakwater and broke up.

=== 7 February ===
List of shipwrecks: 7 February 1896
Ship	State	Description
Arthur Lambert	United States	The steamer was destroyed by fire at Gretna, Louisiana while tied up alongside J. P. Jackson (United States) that had caught fire and spread.
Jim Montgomery	United States	The steamer was swamped and sunk at dock at Louisville, Kentucky by the wake of a passing steamer. Later raised.
J. P. Jackson	United States	The steamer was destroyed by fire while lying at Gretna, Louisiana.

=== 8 February ===
List of shipwrecks: 8 February 1896
Ship	State	Description
Claudia	United States	The steamer caught fire off Beverly, New Jersey and was beached, she burned to the waterline.

=== 9 February ===
List of shipwrecks: 9 February 1896
Ship	State	Description
Resolute	United States	The schooner was wrecked on Little Lorraine Island near Louisbourg, Nova Scotia. One crewman killed.

=== 10 February ===
List of shipwrecks: 10 February 1896
Ship	State	Description
Walter R. Love	United States	The steamer filled and sank while lying at Chattanooga, Tennessee.

=== 11 February ===
List of shipwrecks: 11 February 1896
Ship	State	Description
Alfred Lister	United States	The lighter struck the bar at the Rockaway Bell Buoy and sprung a leak. She blew off the bar in high wind, filled and sank.

=== 12 February ===
List of shipwrecks: 12 February 1896
Ship	State	Description
Ewo	United Kingdom	The steam oil tanker exploded when a crewman used a naked light near the petroleum tanks, while loading at Zorritos, Peru; the crew survived. The resulting fire continued for several weeks.

=== 14 February ===
List of shipwrecks: 14 February 1896
Ship	State	Description
Paulina Wilbur	United States	The steamer caught fire while loading oil at Gibson's Point on the Schuylkill River and was beached and sank.

=== 15 February ===
List of shipwrecks: 15 February 1896
Ship	State	Description
Rescue	United States	The tug sprung a leak off Red Hook Flats, Brooklyn, New York. She ran to German American Stores, Brooklyn where she sank in 17 feet (5.2 m) of water. Raised on 16 February.

=== 18 February ===
List of shipwrecks: 18 February 1896
Ship	State	Description
City of Lynn	United States	The tug caught fire off Glenwood, New York and was beached.

=== 20 February ===
List of shipwrecks: 20 February 1896
Ship	State	Description
Edwin J. Wood	United States	The laid up steamer was destroyed by fire at Darraghville, Louisiana.

=== 21 February ===
List of shipwrecks: 21 February 1896
Ship	State	Description
James	United States	The steamer sank at dock at the foot of Hanover Street, Philadelphia, Pennsylvania.
Thomas Newton	United States	The steamer was damaged in a collision with the barge Beaufort, being towed by J. Alvah Clark, at Norfolk, Virginia. She was beached to prevent sinking, but burned to the water's edge when lime in her cargo ignited.

=== 22 February ===
List of shipwrecks: 22 February 1896
Ship	State	Description
Jim Watson	United States	The laid up steamer was destroyed by fire at New Orleans, Louisiana.

=== 24 February ===
List of shipwrecks: 24 February 1896
Ship	State	Description
New York Central Lighterage Co. No. 6	United States	The tug keeled over onto her port side due to ice buildup, filled and sank off Sixty-Eighth Street, New York City in the North River.

=== 25 February ===
List of shipwrecks: 25 February 1896
Ship	State	Description
Samuel H. Paul	United States	The steamer struck a log and sank opposite Martinsburg, Kentucky in three feet (0.91 m) of water in the Cumberland River. Raised and repaired.

=== 27 February ===
List of shipwrecks: 27 February 1896
Ship	State	Description
Mabel Taylor	Canada	The vessel was wrecked on Santa Rosa Island, Florida.

=== 28 February ===
List of shipwrecks: 28 February 1896
Ship	State	Description
Point Loma	United States	The steam schooner sprang a leak in a heavy gale. The rising water put out her fires and she was wrecked near McKenzie Head, Washington, a total loss.

=== 29 February ===
List of shipwrecks: 29 February 1896
Ship	State	Description
Ailsa	United Kingdom	The steamer was rammed and sunk by the French liner La Bourgogne while anchored at the entrance to New York Harbor in fog. All on board were rescued.

== March ==
=== 2 March ===
List of shipwrecks: 2 March 1896
Ship	State	Description
Rosstrevor	United Kingdom	The passenger-cargo ship grounded at Carlingford Lough. Refloated on 7 March, repaired and returned to service.
Sunshine	United States	The steamer sank at dock in a gale at the Government Wharf, Broadwater, Virginia.

=== 4 March ===
List of shipwrecks: 4 March 1896
Ship	State	Description
John L. Hasbrouck	United States	The passenger steamer was crowded by ice and struck a reef in the Hudson River off New Hamburg, New York and sank.

=== 5 March ===
List of shipwrecks: 5 March 1896
Ship	State	Description
Kate	United States	The tug sank at dock in East Boston, Massachusetts due to ice and high winds. Later raised.

=== 6 March ===
List of shipwrecks: 6 March 1896
Ship	State	Description
Volanta	United States	The steamer burned to the waterline overnight at Newport, Oregon.
Volo	Norway	During a voyage from Goteburg, Sweden, to Lourenço Marques, Portuguese East Africa, with a cargo of Baltic pine timber, the barque was wrecked without loss of life on the coast of South Africa near the mouth of the Bushman River.

=== 7 March ===
List of shipwrecks: 7 March 1896
Ship	State	Description
Lincoln	United States	The two-masted schooner departed Seattle, Washington, bound for Cook Inlet on the south-central coast of the District of Alaska with 37 people on board and was never heard from again. She probably sank in a severe storm that struck the Gulf of Alaska during the first week of April.
Silver Wave	United States	The steamer struck a snag and sank at Morten's Landing, Kentucky in three feet (0.91 m) of water. Raised, taken to Cincinnati, Ohio and repaired.

=== 9 March ===
List of shipwrecks: 9 March 1896
Ship	State	Description
Monohansett	United States	The steamer struck a rock and sank at Woods Hole, Massachusetts.

=== 11 March ===
List of shipwrecks: 11 March 1896
Ship	State	Description
R. B. Kendall	United States	The steamer sprung a leak and sank over night at dock in Charleston, West Virginia. Raised and repaired.
T. K. Green	United States	The steamer foundered in a gale on Catahoula Lake. Later raised.

=== 13 March ===
List of shipwrecks: 13 March 1896
Ship	State	Description
Morse & Showdy	United States	The canal boat was sunk in a collision with the tug Pottsville (United States) off The Battery, New York.

=== 16 March ===
List of shipwrecks: 16 March 1896
Ship	State	Description
Hawk	United States	The steamer struck a snag and sank at Knob Coal Works on the Monongahela River. Raised, repaired, and returned to service.

=== 18 March ===
List of shipwrecks: 18 March 1896
Ship	State	Description
Volusia	United States	The steamer sprung a leak and sank in the Atlantic Ocean (32°00′N 74°00′W). The crew were rescued by the bark Linda Mordenrogen (Russia).

=== 25 March ===
List of shipwrecks: 25 March 1896
Ship	State	Description
Willie	United States	The tug was damaged in a collision with Express (United States) off Pier 39, New York in the East River. She made a run for her dock but sank off Pier 11.

=== 26 March ===
List of shipwrecks: 26 March 1896
Ship	State	Description
Sam Brown	United States	The tow steamer caught fire, burned to the waterline, and sank a short distance below New Albany, Indiana in the Ohio River, a total loss.

=== 27 March ===
List of shipwrecks: 27 March 1896
Ship	State	Description
Ellen	United States	The steamer was destroyed by fire while lying at Hog Island, Florida.

=== 28 March ===
List of shipwrecks: 28 March 1896
Ship	State	Description
D. Roughan	United States	The tug sprang a leak and sank at dock over night in Chelsea, Massachusetts. Later raised.

=== 30 March ===
List of shipwrecks: 30 March 1896
Ship	State	Description
Isabel L.	United States	The steamer was destroyed in the Pascagoula River when her boiler exploded.

== April ==
=== 5 April ===
List of shipwrecks: 5 April 1896
Ship	State	Description
Hustler	United States	The steamer was wrecked when she struck a pier of the Eleventh Street Bridge, Pittsburgh, Pennsylvania on the Alleghany River.

=== 10 April ===
List of shipwrecks: 10 April 1896
Ship	State	Description
City of Dallas	United States	On a trip from New Orleans, Louisiana, to Central America the steamer broke the crank pin in her engine causing a leak that caused her to sink. Three crew killed.

=== 11 April ===
List of shipwrecks: 11 April 1896
Ship	State	Description
Peter Dalton	United States	The tow steamer was destroyed by fire in Lake Michigan near Chicago, Illinois.
SMS S48	Imperial German Navy	The S43-class torpedo boat sank with the loss of five lives after colliding during a storm with the torpedo boat SMS S46 (Imperial German Navy) in the Jade in Germany.

=== 12 April ===
List of shipwrecks: 12 April 1896
Ship	State	Description
Dave Wood	United States	The steamer sank at Tremont Coal Works on the Monongahela River. Raised, repaired, and returned to service. One crewman killed, one injured.
Emma Lee	United States	The steamer was destroyed by fire at Campbell's Landing, 125 miles (201 km) above Memphis, Tennessee.

=== 17 April ===
List of shipwrecks: 17 April 1896
Ship	State	Description
William J. Booth	United States	The tug burned off One Hundred Fifty-Second Street, New York City in the North River, a total loss.

=== 18 April ===
List of shipwrecks: 18 April 1896
Ship	State	Description
Alex Perry	United States	The steamer was destroyed by fire at Evansville, Indiana when an unidentified large wharf boat caught fire and the fire spread.
Unknown wharf boat	United States	A large wharf boat caught fire and was destroyed at Evansville, Indiana. Four other vessels were destroyed when the fire spread.
Unknown wharf boats	United States	Two small wharf boats were destroyed by fire at Evansville, Indiana when a large wharf boat caught fire and the fire spread.
W. L. Norton	United States	The steamer was destroyed by fire at Evansville, Indiana when an unidentified large wharf boat caught fire and the fire spread.

=== 20 April ===
List of shipwrecks: 20 April 1896
Ship	State	Description
C. C. Martin	United States	The steamer struck a snag near Newark, West Virginia on the Little Kanawha River and sank.

=== 22 April ===
List of shipwrecks: 22 April 1896
Ship	State	Description
Mermaid	United States	The tow steamer was turning two lighters around, but caught on her tow line amidships, she capsized and sank in the St. Johns River nine miles (14 km) below Jacksonville, Florida. Later raised.

=== 25 April ===
List of shipwrecks: 25 April 1896
Ship	State	Description
Edward E. Webster	United States	The 98.8-gross register ton, 83.5-foot (25.5 m) sealing schooner departed Kodiak, District of Alaska, with a crew of 29 aboard and was never heard from again. She was last seen near the Trinity Islands (56.5500°N 154.3333°W) by the sealing schooner Herman (United States), with which she was hunting. Herman reported her lost at San Francisco, California, on 26 September.

=== 26 April ===
List of shipwrecks: 26 April 1896
Ship	State	Description
Corona	United States	The tug caught fire at Ward's Shipyard, Astoria, New York. The city's fire department filled her with water until she sank.

=== 28 April ===
List of shipwrecks: 28 April 1896
Ship	State	Description
Wyanoke	United States	The passenger steamer was sunk in a collision with the anchored USS Columbia at Newport News, Virginia. She had 107 passengers and 42 crew onboard, of which two passengers and one crewman drowned, and one crewman died of injuries in the hospital.

=== 29 April ===
List of shipwrecks: 29 April 1896
Ship	State	Description
Louise	United States	The steamer was damaged in a collision with Rose Hite (United States) six miles (9.7 km) above Evansville, Indiana. She proceeded to the bank, where she sank later.

== May ==
=== 2 May ===
List of shipwrecks: 2 May 1896
Ship	State	Description
Billy Kilby	United States	The steamer struck a snag and sank at Plaquemine, Louisiana. Later raised.

=== 3 May ===
List of shipwrecks: 3 May 1896
Ship	State	Description
Robert Robinson	United States	The tug caught fire off South Amboy, New Jersey. She was beached and burned to the water's edge.

=== 5 May ===
List of shipwrecks: 5 May 1896
Ship	State	Description
Fountain City	United States	The steamer caught fire at dock in Sturgeon Bay, Wisconsin. Her mooring lines burned through and she drifted onto a mud bank near the Leathem and Smith dock, a total loss.

=== 6 May ===
List of shipwrecks: 6 May 1896
Ship	State	Description
Columbia	United States	The lighter caught fire at Pier 14, New York City in the North River. She was towed to mid-stream where she burned to the waterline and sank.

=== 7 May ===
List of shipwrecks: 7 May 1896
Ship	State	Description
Jennie Gilchrist	United States	The steamer filled and sank while lying at the bank two miles (3.2 km) above Danville in the Tennessee River when she lost a plug in her hull. Later raised.

=== 10 May ===
List of shipwrecks: 10 May 1896
Ship	State	Description
Harry Brown	United States	The steamer was sunk when her boiler exploded at Ursina Landing in the Mississippi River. Ten crew lost.

=== 11 May ===
List of shipwrecks: 11 May 1896
Ship	State	Description
Sentinel	United States	The steamer sprung a leak and sank at dock at New Orleans, Louisiana a total loss.

=== 17 May ===
List of shipwrecks: 17 May 1896
Ship	State	Description
Mary D. Ayer	United States	The lumber schooner was damaged in a collision with Onoko (United States) in dense fog and rain in Lake Michigan off Gross Point, Evanston, Illinois. Several hours later she was taken under tow by City of Duluth (United States), but sank shortly after that off Chicago. Her captain William Williamson and four crew were killed (Charles Matson, mate, Henry Shira, seaman, Tom, deckhand, and Fitz, cook), two (William Grell, Alexander Sturen) were rescued by City of Duluth.

=== 18 May ===
List of shipwrecks: 18 May 1896
Ship	State	Description
Decatur H. Miller	United States	The steamer was sunk in a collision with Bowden (United States) in Baltimore Harbor.

=== 20 May ===
List of shipwrecks: 20 May 1896
Ship	State	Description
Choctaw	United States	The steamer was sunk in a collision with L. C. Waldo (United States) in the Ste. Marie River. Refloated on 1 June and taken to Cleveland, Ohio for repairs.
Delaware	United States	The laid up steamer was destroyed by fire at the Wilmington and Northern Railroad Dock, Wilmington, Delaware.

=== 21 May ===
List of shipwrecks: 21 May 1896
Ship	State	Description
Queen City	United States	The steamer struck a snag and sank at Crabapple Bluff on the Chattahoochee River, later raised.

=== 22 May ===
List of shipwrecks: 22 May 1896
Ship	State	Description
Andrew Jackson	United States	The coal barge (and former full-rigged ship), in tow from Norfolk, Virginia, was run into by steam tanker Vedra (United Kingdom) and sank. The wreck was removed June–August 1896.
Belgravia	United Kingdom	The ocean liner ran aground in heavy fog on Saints Rest Beach shortly after departing Saint John, New Brunswick, Canada, without loss of life. She was declared a total loss.

=== 24 May ===
List of shipwrecks: 24 May 1896
Ship	State	Description
Mermaid	United States	The tow steamer burned while lying at Palatka, Florida, a total loss.

=== 26 May ===
List of shipwrecks: 26 May 1896
Ship	State	Description
Katherine	United States	The steamer was capsized by a tornado at Cairo, Illinois. Raised and repaired. 11 lives lost.

=== 27 May ===
List of shipwrecks: 27 May 1896
Ship	State	Description
Andrew Christy	United States	1896 St. Louis–East St. Louis tornado: The steamer was sunk at St. Louis in a tornado.
Arkansas City	United States	1896 St. Louis–East St. Louis tornado: The steamer was sunk/wrecked at St. Louis in a tornado.
Bald Eagle	United States	1896 St. Louis–East St. Louis tornado: The steamer was sunk at St. Louis in a tornado.
City of Cairo	United States	1896 St. Louis–East St. Louis tornado: The steamer was sunk/wrecked at St. Louis in a tornado.
City of Monroe	United States	1896 St. Louis–East St. Louis tornado: The steamer was sunk/wrecked at St. Louis in a tornado.
City of Quincy	United States	1896 St. Louis–East St. Louis tornado: The steamer was sunk at St. Louis in a tornado.
Dolphin No. 2	United States	1896 St. Louis–East St. Louis tornado: The steamer was sunk at St. Louis during a tornado when the steamer Pittsburgh (United States) and an unknown wharf boat that had broken free of their moorings struck her causing her to capsize, they passed over her hull.
Gazelle	United States	1896 St. Louis–East St. Louis tornado: The steamer was sunk at St. Louis in a tornado.
Isabella	United States	1896 St. Louis–East St. Louis tornado: The steamer was sunk at St. Louis in a tornado.
J. J. Odil	United States	1896 St. Louis–East St. Louis tornado: The steamer was sunk at St. Louis in a tornado.
Jay Gould	United States	1896 St. Louis–East St. Louis tornado: The steamer was sunk at St. Louis in a tornado.
Libbie Conger	United States	1896 St. Louis–East St. Louis tornado: The steamer was moored at the foot of Biddle Street, St. Louis when a tornado broke her loose from her moorings. She drifted one mile (1.6 km) down river before sinking. Her captain, his wife and two children were lost.

=== 28 May ===
List of shipwrecks: 28 May 1896
Ship	State	Description
Transfer	United States	The sand dredge sprung a leak and sank in Lake Erie at Lorain, Ohio and was abandoned as a total loss.
Unknown schooner		The schooner was sunk in a collision with the steamer Nutmeg State (United States) off Catherine Street, New York City in the East River.

=== 30 May ===
List of shipwrecks: 30 May 1896
Ship	State	Description
Ben Franklin	United States	The pleasure launch was sunk when she struck Car Float No. 4 (United States) at the Harlem River Bridge, Harlem, New York in the Harlem River. Three women on board drowned.
Ironsides	United States	The steamer struck Lee Creek bar in the Ohio River and sank up to the main deck. Raised 18 hours later and repaired in Pittsburgh, Pennsylvania.

=== 31 May ===
List of shipwrecks: 31 May 1896
Ship	State	Description
Wm. F. Munroe	United States	The steamer struck a pier of the Great Northern Railroad on the Skagit River and sank.

== June ==
=== 5 June ===
List of shipwrecks: 5 June 1896
Ship	State	Description
Princesse Clementine	Belgium	The steamship collided with the sailing ship Axel Wästfelt (Sweden) in the Bay of Biscay (45°50′N 9°30′E.

=== 11 June ===
List of shipwrecks: 11 June 1896
Ship	State	Description
C. A. Warfield	United States	The canal boat was sunk when she struck the yacht Corsair (United States) off Thirty-Forth Street, New York City in the North River.

=== 12 June ===
List of shipwrecks: 12 June 1896
Ship	State	Description
Henrietta	United States	The steamer sank from being overloaded at Big Eddy in the St. Francis River.

=== 16 June ===
List of shipwrecks: 16 June 1896
Ship	State	Description
Corrine No. 2	United States	The tug burned to the waterline and sank in the Mississippi River near Cairo, Illinois, a total loss.
Drummond Castle	United Kingdom	The ocean liner ran aground at Ushant, France, and sank with the loss of 242 lives.
Rosebud	United States	The steamer settled on a submerged piling when the river level dropped at Bismarck, North Dakota and sank, a total loss.

=== 19 June ===
List of shipwrecks: 19 June 1896
Ship	State	Description
J. W. Campbell	United States	The schooner was sunk in a squall off Long Island, New York. Lost with all nine hands.

=== 21 June ===
List of shipwrecks: 21 June 1896
Ship	State	Description
Buckeye Boy	United States	The steamer burned to the water's edge at South Point, Ohio, a total loss.

=== 23 June ===
List of shipwrecks: 23 June 1896
Ship	State	Description
Commerce	United States	The barge was destroyed by fire at dock at Taylor's Bridge, Delaware.
Lancaster	United States	The passenger steamer was destroyed by fire while lying at the bank in the Ohio River at Golconda, Illinois, a total loss.

=== 26 June ===
List of shipwrecks: 26 June 1896
Ship	State	Description
May Queen	United States	The steamer was destroyed by fire in the Merrimac River.

=== Unknown date ===
List of shipwrecks: Unknown June 1896
Ship	State	Description
City of Oshkosh	United States	The steamer caught fire on 17 or 19 June in Lake Poygan, near Oshkosh, Wisconsin and drifted ashore, burning to the waterline, a total loss.

== July ==
=== 1 July ===
List of shipwrecks: 1 July 1896
Ship	State	Description
John C. Munro	United Kingdom	The ship was wrecked on the east coast of Eastern Fields, British New Guinea, just east of the entrance to Torres Straits. The crew of the captain's boat was picked up by a steamer while the mate's boat managed to reach the coast of New Guinea.
Pearl Hedges	United States	The tug was sunk when Josie (United States) blew into her in a severe gale at Paducah, Kentucky. Later raised.

=== 7 July ===
List of shipwrecks: 7 July 1896
Ship	State	Description
Eagle	United States	The schooner sank in a storm off Pensacola, Florida in Pensacola Bay.
Florence	United States	The schooner sank in a storm in Pensacola Bay, Florida.
Leroy	United States	The schooner was beached on the west shore of Pensacola Bay, Florida, in a storm and broke up.
Nelley Keyser	United States	The steamer struck a railroad bridge in a gale and sank in Escambia Bay, later raised.

=== 10 July ===
List of shipwrecks: 10 July 1896
Ship	State	Description
Audacieux	French Navy	The torpedo boat sank after a collision.
Jessie Wilson	United States	The ferry filled and sank over night at dock in the Ohio River at Shawneetown, Illinois. Raised, repaired and returned to service.
Pentagoet	United States	The steamer struck a rock near Pasque Island in Vineyard Sound and was leaking badly enough that she was beached on the island to prevent sinking. Refloated and taken to New York City for repairs.

=== 12 July ===
List of shipwrecks: 12 July 1896
Ship	State	Description
Bella Mac	United States	The steamer struck an obstruction and sank in five feet (1.5 m) of water in the Mississippi River near Fishers Island. Raised and repaired.
Rustler	United States	The steamer struck a rock and broke in two in Box Canyon on the Kootenay River, a total loss.

=== 13 July ===
List of shipwrecks: 13 July 1896
Ship	State	Description
Immanuel	United Kingdom	The ship was wrecked in the Teifi Estuary.

=== 14 July ===
List of shipwrecks: 14 July 1896
Ship	State	Description
Colombia	United States	The steamer was wrecked in thick fog off the Pigeon Point Lighthouse, California, a total loss.
Colorado	United States	The steamship was damaged in a collision with a barge towed by Charles Runyon (United States) in the Swash Channel tearing a hole in her side. She was beached where she filled with water. The next day she was patched and pulled off and taken to Erie Basin, Brooklyn.
Daniel McCaffrey	United States	The canal boat was sunk in a collision with the ferry Plainfield (United States) in the North River.
Lulu G.	United States	The yacht got caught in a wave trough while answering a distress call on Lake Winnebago and sank near shore.

=== 17 July ===
List of shipwrecks: 17 July 1896
Ship	State	Description
L. B. Johnson	United States	The tow steamer was sunk in a collision with Mary Mills (United States) in Chicago Harbor in 30 feet (9.1 m) of water. Raised and repaired.
Sadie L.	United States	The steamer struck a snag and sank in the Pascagoula River, a total loss.

=== 19 July ===
List of shipwrecks: 19 July 1896
Ship	State	Description
Anna Pepina	Austria-Hungary	The barque was wrecked on Santa Rosa Island, Florida (30°19′N 87°18′W).
Comrade	United States	The steamer caught fire at dock at Erie, Pennsylvania and was destroyed.

=== 20 July ===
List of shipwrecks: 20 July 1896
Ship	State	Description
Blue Jay	United States	The fishing schooner was sunk near Point Judith, Rhode Island. The crew were rescued.
Ella Andrews	United States	The laid up steamer foundered at dock in New Orleans, Louisiana. Later raised.

=== 22 July ===
List of shipwrecks: 22 July 1896
Ship	State	Description
Paul Tulane	United States	The steamer struck a snag and sank in the Mississippi River at Cora Plantation, above Donaldsonville, Louisiana, a total loss.

=== 23 July ===
List of shipwrecks: 23 July 1896
Ship	State	Description
SMS Iltis	Imperial German Navy	The gunboat sank in the East China Sea off China′s Shandong Peninsula near Qingdao during a typhoon with the loss of 77 lives. There were 11 survivors.

=== 24 July ===
List of shipwrecks: 24 July 1896
Ship	State	Description
Hidalgo	United States	After being forced ashore by ice about eight nautical miles (15 km; 9.2 mi) west of Cape Thompson on the Chukchi Sea coast of the District of Alaska on 21 July, the 175-ton, 101-foot (30.8 m) brigantine broke up when the ice washed away. The revenue cutter USRC Bear ( United States Revenue Cutter Service) rescued her entire crew of 27.
Messenger	United States	The steamer burned to the waterline at St. Helens, Oregon, a total loss.

=== 25 July ===
List of shipwrecks: 25 July 1896
Ship	State	Description
A. J. Hoole	United States	The tug was towing the schooner J. S. Lamprey (United States). When she stopped at Riker's Island to pick up a second tow she was run down, rolled, and sunk by Lamprey. Raised the next day.
Irene D.	United States	The steamer struck a rock near Shoemaker's Chain, she ran to Government Island where she sank in four feet (1.2 m) of water. Raised and repaired.

=== 28 July ===
List of shipwrecks: 28 July 1896
Ship	State	Description
Birdie Bailey	United States	The steamer struck a snag and sank in the Yazoo River at Bartonia, Mississippi, a total loss.

=== 29 July ===
List of shipwrecks: 29 July 1896
Ship	State	Description
Gus Genin	United States	The tow steamer filled and sank overnight lying at the bank of the Ohio River above Evansville, Indiana, a total loss.
Pin Oak	United States	The steamer struck an obstruction, capsized and sank in the Mississippi River at Wys's Landing, or sunk in the Missouri River 26 miles (42 km) above Jefferson City, Missouri.
Tillie	United States	The steamer ran aground on the south east end of Fishers Island, New York in thick fog. Refloated on 1 August.

=== 30 July ===
List of shipwrecks: 30 July 1896
Ship	State	Description
Hero	United States	During a voyage from "Wood Island" (probably Woody Island in the Kodiak Archipelago) to "Seldoria C. I." (probably Seldovia), the 8.8-gross register ton, 31-foot (9.4 m) schooner was wrecked in fog on a rock in the Barren Islands off the south-central coast of the District of Alaska, becoming a total loss. Her crew of two survived.
Rajah Brooke	Sarawak	While en route from Singapore to Kuching, the cargo ship ran aground and was wrecked on Victory Island in the South China Sea between Singapore and Borneo.
Vandalia	United States	The schooner was sunk in a collision with Massachusetts (United States) off Cornfield Shoal.

== August ==
=== 1 August ===
List of shipwrecks: 1 August 1896
Ship	State	Description
Dido	United States	The yacht broke loose from her moorings, drifted down river striking an empty barge at the Pittsburgh City Docks on the Monongahela River causing her to capsize. Her cabin was wrecked and her boiler dropped out. Her hull and boiler were recovered, repaired, and returned to service.

=== 5 August ===
List of shipwrecks: 5 August 1896
Ship	State	Description
Hawthorn	United States	The yacht was sunk in a collision with Iowa (United States) in Chicago Harbor near the government breakwater.

=== 8 August ===
List of shipwrecks: 8 August 1896
Ship	State	Description
Ceres	United States	The steam elevator was sunk in a collision with RMS Etruria (United Kingdom) in New York Bay.
Emeline	United States	During a voyage in ballast from Charlevoix, Michigan, to Kenosha, Wisconsin, with a cargo of tamarack bark, the 111.4-foot (34 m), 127.9-gross register ton three-masted schooner capsized in Lake Michigan during a squall 20 to 25 nautical miles (37 to 46 km; 23 to 29 mi) southeast of Baileys Harbor, Wisconsin. Her crew of four abandoned ship safely and rowed to Baileys Harbor in a yawl. The tug Sydney Smith (United States) and schooner Nancy Dell (United States) righted Emeline on 9 August, but she capsized again that night, and by 22 August had sunk off Anclam Pier in Baileys Harbor in 21 feet (6.4 m) of water, with only two of her masts, her spars, and her gunwales above the surface. By January 1897, the wreck had broken apart, with the stern section moving 600 feet (180 m) north of the bow section. The wreck was deemed a hazard to navigation and dynamited in September 1903. An unidentified wreck lying in an average of 18 feet (5.5 m) of water at 45°04.103′N 087°07.110′W probably is that of Emeline.
St. Paul	United States	The cargo liner steamer/barkentine was wrecked in thick fog off Point Punos Lighthouse, California, near Pebble Beach, California a total loss. The crew and much of her cargo of livestock were rescued by Gipsy.

=== 9 August ===
List of shipwrecks: 9 August 1896
Ship	State	Description
Butcher Boy	United States	The tow steamer stranded on the bar at the mouth of the Chagrin River and broke up.

=== 11 August ===
List of shipwrecks: 11 August 1896
Ship	State	Description
George S. Townsend	United States	The tug was sunk in a collision with Float No. 31 being towed by Transfer No. 6 (United States) off Palmer's Dock, Brooklyn.
Lizzie Henderson	United States	The steamer caught fire at dock at the foot of Forty-sixth Street, New York City in the North River. She was towed to mid stream by a Fire Department New York fireboat that then filled her with water, sinking her off Pier 1. Wreck removed by 19 August.

=== 14 August ===
List of shipwrecks: 14 August 1896
Ship	State	Description
Ocianica	United States	The steamer was sunk in a collision with Wm. Chisholm (United States) in the southern end of Lake St. Clair. Later raised.
Wm. Chisholm or William Chisholm	United States	The steamer was sunk in a collision with Ocianica (United States) in the southern end of Lake St. Clair. Later raised, repaired and returned to service.

=== 18 August ===
List of shipwrecks: 18 August 1896
Ship	State	Description
C. H. Woods	United States	The steamer was lying by the bank for the night, but careened, filled with water and sank at Harmar on the Ohio River when the river level dropped and she got hung up on the bank. Raised, repaired, and returned to service.

=== 21 August ===
List of shipwrecks: 21 August 1896
Ship	State	Description
Black Diamond	United States	The steamer struck an obstruction and sank at Johnson's Landing, Arkansas in the Black River. Raised and repaired.

=== 23 August ===
List of shipwrecks: 23 August 1896
Ship	State	Description
Aurelia	United States	The steamer caught on a wreck off Mispillion River, careened and filled.
City of Hickman	United States	The steamer struck an obstruction and sank at Island No. 40 in the Mississippi River, a total loss.

=== 27 August ===
List of shipwrecks: 27 August 1896
Ship	State	Description
HHS Glasgow	Zanzibar	The tips of the masts and funnel of Glasgow at Zanzibar Town harbour in 1902 Anglo-Zanzibar War: The royal yacht was sunk by the Royal Navy. All crew rescued.

=== 30 August ===
List of shipwrecks: 30 August 1896
Ship	State	Description
Florence Shank	United States	The steamer burned to the water line and sank at dock over night at Parkersburg, West Virginia in the Little Kanawha River, a total loss.

=== 31 August ===
List of shipwrecks: 31 August 1896
Ship	State	Description
State of Michigan	United States	The steamer struck a rock off Pointe aux Barques Light and was beached to prevent sinking.

== September ==
=== 3 September ===
List of shipwrecks: 3 September 1896
Ship	State	Description
Orion	United States	The ferry was sunk when wind blew her against the dock in Baltimore, Maryland.
Rosedale	United States	The steamer was sunk in a collision with the ferry Oregon (United States) in the East River off South Fifth Street, Brooklyn, or Broome Street, New York City. Raised by Chapman Derrick and Wrecking Co.

=== 6 September ===
List of shipwrecks: 6 September 1896
Ship	State	Description
Thomas Carter	United States	The steamer capsized and sank in the Niagara River off Hickory Reef. A male and a female passenger died.

=== 9 September ===
List of shipwrecks: 9 September 1896
Ship	State	Description
Elfin	United States	The schooner was wrecked near Manchester. Crew saved.

=== 10 September ===
List of shipwrecks: 10 September 1896
Ship	State	Description
James A. Borland	United States	During a voyage from Karluk, District of Alaska, to San Francisco, California, with four passengers, a crew of 13, and a cargo of 27,333 cases of canned salmon aboard, the 670-gross register ton, 145-foot (44.2 m) bark was wrecked in fog on Tugidak Island in the Kodiak Archipelago without loss of life.

=== 12 September ===
List of shipwrecks: 12 September 1896
Ship	State	Description
James Dever	United States	The fishing schooner was sunk in a collision with steamship Reading (United States) in thick fog 14 miles (23 km) south west of Gay Head.

=== 14 September ===
List of shipwrecks: 14 September 1896
Ship	State	Description
Silver Dart	United States	The fishing schooner was wrecked near highland Light, Cape Cod. The crew were saved.

=== 15 September ===
List of shipwrecks: 15 September 1896
Ship	State	Description
Fair Play	United States	The steamer struck a snag and sank up to the main deck opposite Bloch's Landing on the Ohio River. Raised, repaired, and returned to service.
Rufus Ingalls	United States	The laid up steamer sank at dock at Velasco, Texas near the mouth of the Brazos River.

=== 17 September ===
List of shipwrecks: 17 September 1896
Ship	State	Description
Occoquan	United States	The steamer was sunk when she struck a log in Occoquan Creek, Virginia.

=== 18 September ===
List of shipwrecks: 18 September 1896
Ship	State	Description
Ethel and Marion	United States	The steamer sank at dock over night at San Francisco when someone ran a hose from a fire hydrant to the ship and flooded her. Later raised.
New South	United States	The steamer was struck by a violent storm in the Mississippi River near Harrisonville, Illinois and went ashore.

=== 20 September ===
List of shipwrecks: 20 September 1896
Ship	State	Description
Evie	United States	The tug burned at the Abby Dock, Albany, New York, a total loss.
Lula Prince	United States	The steamer struck a snag and sank near Simsport, Louisiana in the Atchafalaya River. Later raised.

=== 22 September ===
List of shipwrecks: 22 September 1896
Ship	State	Description
Christiana	United Kingdom	The smack was wrecked at Poppit, Pembrokeshire. Her crew were rescued by Lizzie & Charles Leigh Clare ( Royal National Lifeboat Institution).
San Jose	Canada	The 55-ton sealing schooner was wrecked without loss of life on a rocky beach in "Akun Cove" – probably the body of water now known as Akun Bay (54°15′N 165°30′W) – on Akun Island near Unimak Pass in the Aleutian Islands during a gale. The steamer Dora (flag unknown) rescued her crew on 23 September, and before leaving San Jose her captain burned her wreck to prevent it from becoming a hazard to navigation.

=== 24 September ===
List of shipwrecks: 24 September 1896
Ship	State	Description
Hugo	Spain	The former White Star Line passenger liner ran aground on Terschelling Island in the Netherlands. She was declared a total loss. After refloating, she was auctioned for scrap on 9 December 1896 and towed to Amsterdam, where she was broken up
J. W. Hunt	United States	The canal boat, being towed by John B. Dallas (United States), struck the anchored yacht Narada (United States) in the North River and sank.

=== 25 September ===
List of shipwrecks: 26 September 1896
Ship	State	Description
"St. Columba"	United Kingdom	The fishing lugger sank. Crew rescued by trawler "Burmah" (United Kingdom) 25 miles south of Old Head of Kinsdale.

=== 26 September ===
List of shipwrecks: 26 September 1896
Ship	State	Description
Alexander James Yeats	United Kingdom	The ship ran aground at Gurnard's Head. Crew of 19 rescued.
Katie	United States	The steamer struck a snag and sank in the Savannah River.

=== 27 September ===
List of shipwrecks: 27 September 1896
Ship	State	Description
Adgar	Flag unknown	The ship was wrecked off Folkestone, Kent, United Kingdom. All crew saved by the Hythe Lifeboat.
Baron Holberg		The ship was wrecked off Folkestone, Kent, United Kingdom. All crew saved by the Hythe Lifeboat.

=== 28 September ===
List of shipwrecks: 28 September 1896
Ship	State	Description
Minnie Mees	United States	The tug was destroyed by fire at dock at Superior, Wisconsin.

=== 29 September ===
List of shipwrecks: 29 September 1896
Ship	State	Description
Robert Turner	United States	1896 Cedar Keys hurricane: The steamer was sunk in the Savannah River during a hurricane. Her master, two crewmen, and one passenger died.

=== 30 September ===
List of shipwrecks: 30 September 1896
Ship	State	Description
E. P. Shaw	United States	The steamer burned at Dighton, Massachusetts, probably destroyed.
Redfield	United States	The tow steamer was damaged in a collision with tow boat Edwin Terry (United States) in the Hudson River and was run aground to prevent sinking.
Sumatra	United States	The barge, under tow by B. W. Arnold (United States), sprung a leak in high seas on Lake Michigan and lost her hatches off South Point, Milwaukee, Wisconsin causing her to founder. Two of the crew was rescued by Simpson (United States), her captain was rescued by the United States Life Saving Service, and the rest were lost.

=== Unknown date ===
List of shipwrecks: Unknown September 1896
Ship	State	Description
Emeline	United States	The passenger steamer was sunk when she struck a rock in the Hudson River. Raised, repaired, and returned to service.
Theyetmayo	United Kingdom	The vessel was lost off Iceland sometime in September.

== October ==
=== 1 October ===
List of shipwrecks: 1 October 1896
Ship	State	Description
Clayton H. Webb	United States	The passenger steamer was destroyed by fire while lying by the bank of the Cumberland River two miles (3.2 km) above Nashville, Tennessee. She burned to the waterline and sank in ten feet (3.0 m) of water.

=== 5 October ===
List of shipwrecks: 5 October 1896
Ship	State	Description
Harry Cottrell	United States	The steamer sprung a leak and sank at the mouth of the Detroit River in 20 feet (6.1 m) of water.

=== 6 October ===
List of shipwrecks: 6 October 1896
Ship	State	Description
Columbia	United States	The steamer struck a snag and sank below Raymond City, West Virginia in the Great Kanawha River. Raised, taken to Charleston, West Virginia and repaired.

=== 7 October ===
List of shipwrecks: 7 October 1896
Ship	State	Description
Loretta	United States	Loretta After the wooden steam barge caught fire while loaded with a cargo of chains, she was towed out onto Lake Huron off the coast of Michigan, where she sank in 7 feet (2.1 m) of water at 44.81505°N 83.282583°W.

=== 8 October ===
List of shipwrecks: 8 October 1896
Ship	State	Description
Loretta	United States	The steam barge caught fire at dock in the Black River, Michigan, and burned to the water's edge.

=== 9 October ===
List of shipwrecks: 9 October 1896
Ship	State	Description
David B. Hill	United States	The steamer was destroyed by fire while anchored in the Warwick River.
Atlas		a 1,296-ton Norwegian wooden barque built in 1875 in Bath, Maine wrecked on Blouberg Beach in Table Bay on October 9, 1896

=== 10 October ===
List of shipwrecks: 10 October 1896
Ship	State	Description
Dauntless	United States	The steamer was destroyed by fire at Ladd's Island in the White River 15 miles (24 km) below Batesville, Arkansas, a total loss.
John F. Allen	United States	The steamer was destroyed by fire opposite L'Argent Landing, Mississippi at the mouth of the Big Sunflower River.

=== 11 October ===
List of shipwrecks: 11 October 1896
Ship	State	Description
Yazonia	United States	The steamer struck a snag and sank at Belzonia, Mississippi on the Yazoo River. Later raised.

=== 14 October ===
List of shipwrecks: 14 October 1896
Ship	State	Description
Smith Pettit	United States	The tow steamer caught fire in Prince's Bay, Staten Island and was run ashore where she burned to the water's edge.

=== 16 October ===
List of shipwrecks: 16 October 1896
Ship	State	Description
Grand Traverse	United States	On a trip from Green Bay, Wisconsin to Buffalo, New York the steamer was sunk in a collision with Livingstone (United States) one mile (1.6 km) north of the Colchester Shoal Light in 23 feet (7.0 m) of water. Her machinery was salvaged. The wreck was later blown up with dynamite. The crew were rescued by Livingstone.
Niagara	United States	The tow steamer was sunk in a collision with steamer Magenta (United States) off Vesey Street, New York in the North River. Four crewmen killed.

=== 17 October ===
List of shipwrecks: 17 October 1896
Ship	State	Description
Australasia	United States	The steamer caught fire in Lake Michigan eight miles (13 km) east of Cana Island and her crew abandoned her. The tug John Leatham took her under tow four hours later near Jacksonport, Wisconsin and towed her to shore and scuttled her by ramming in 15 feet (4.6 m) of water south of Cave Point, but the water was shallow enough that she continued to burn until she was a total loss.

=== 19 October ===
List of shipwrecks: 19 October 1896
Ship	State	Description
Little Bill	United States	The steamer struck a stump and sank opposite Coal Bluff on the Monongahela River. Raised and repaired.

=== 20 October ===
List of shipwrecks: 20 October 1896
Ship	State	Description
Arago	United States	The steamer sank after being damaged in high seas on an incomplete breakwater inside the bar at Coos Bay, Oregon sinking in five fathoms (30 ft; 9.1 m) of water, a total loss. Nine crew and four passengers lost. Survivors were rescued by the United States Life Saving Service.

=== 22 October ===
List of shipwrecks: 22 October 1896
Ship	State	Description
T. P. Leathers	United States	The steamer sprung a leak and sank 30 miles (48 km) above Natchez, Mississippi in the Mississippi River. Later raised.

=== 23 October ===
List of shipwrecks: 23 October 1896
Ship	State	Description
William Horre	United States	The tow steamer was sunk at dock overnight in the Gowanus Canal at the foot of Smith Street, Brooklyn in 12 feet (3.7 m) of water when her boiler blew up. Her engineer, the only one on board, was killed. The wreck was removed by the Hudson River Lighterage Company between 11–17 January 1897.

=== 25 October ===
List of shipwrecks: 25 October 1896
Ship	State	Description
Toledo	United States	The steamer struck a snag and sank in the Yamhill River. She was raised, but while waiting to be taken to Portland, Oregon for repairs she broke loose from her moorings and was wrecked, a total loss.

=== 26 October ===
List of shipwrecks: 26 October 1896
Ship	State	Description
Rossia	Imperial Russian Navy	The cruiser ran aground off Kronstadt. She was refloated on 15 December and taken in to Kronstadt.

=== 29 October ===
List of shipwrecks: 29 October 1896
Ship	State	Description
Eugene A. Galvin	United States	The yacht struck an obstruction and sank opposite Star Landing, Mississippi, a total loss. Her crew of five abandoned ship in her boat.

=== 30 October ===
List of shipwrecks: 30 October 1896
Ship	State	Description
Courier	United States	The steamer collided with the Kentucky Pier of the Central Bridge in Cincinnati, Ohio, sinking in 10 feet (3.0 m) of water. Raised and repaired.
Samuel P. Ely	United States	The wreck of Samuel P. Ely on 14 June 2008. The schooner sank in Lake Superior without loss of life after dragging her anchors and running into a breakwater during a storm at Two Harbors, Minnesota.

=== 31 October ===
List of shipwrecks: 31 October 1896
Ship	State	Description
May Queen	United States	The canal boat was sunk in a collision with the barge Enterprise (United States), under tow of Edwin Terry (United States), off Verplanck's Point in the Hudson River due to a steering problem on May Queen.

=== Unknown date ===
List of shipwrecks: unknown October 1896
Ship	State	Description
W. W. Story	United States	The fishing smack was lost in the equinoctial storms in the middle of October. Eleven crew lost.

== November ==
=== 2 November ===
List of shipwrecks: 2 November 1896
Ship	State	Description
China	United States	The steamer was sunk when she was struck at dock by Lycoming (United States) at the St. Paul elevator, Chicago, Illinois.

=== 3 November ===
List of shipwrecks: 3 November 1896
Ship	State	Description
Cape Charles	United States	The steamer burned and sank at dock at Spanish Fort, Louisiana on Lake Pontchartrain. Later raised.

=== 7 November ===
List of shipwrecks: 7 November 1896
Ship	State	Description
Commodore	United Kingdom	The steamship ran aground and sank at Sheringham, Norfolk. All seventeen people on board were rescued by the Sheringham Lifeboat. The wreck was dispersed by explosives in 1902.
Z. E. Beecham	United States	The sailing vessel was sunk in a collision with Northampton (United States) off the Bush's Bluff lightship.

=== 8 November ===
List of shipwrecks: 8 November 1896
Ship	State	Description
New Jennie	United States	The laid up steamer burned and sank at dock at New Orleans, Louisiana, a total loss.

=== 9 November ===
List of shipwrecks: 9 November 1896
Ship	State	Description
Ridgeway	United States	The canal boat was destroyed by fire in the Erie Canal at Brighton, New York.

=== 12 November ===
List of shipwrecks: 12 November 1896
Ship	State	Description
L. B. Johnson	United States	The tow steamer was sunk in a collision with V. H. Ketcham (United States) that she was towing when L. B. Johnson crossed V. H. Ketcham's bow and was hit, rolled over and sank in Lake Michigan near Chicago Harbor in smoky weather.

=== 16 November ===
List of shipwrecks: 16 November 1896
Ship	State	Description
Pathfinder	United States	The fishing schooner went ashore at Green Island near Portland, Maine. Crew saved.

=== 17 November ===
List of shipwrecks: 17 November 1896
Ship	State	Description
Memphis	United Kingdom	The cargo ship was wrecked in Dunlough Bay, County Cork with the loss of nine of her crew. She was on a voyage from Montreal, Quebec, Canada to Avonmouth, Somerset.

=== 19 November ===
List of shipwrecks: 19 November 1896
Ship	State	Description
Charles S. Many	United States	The tug was destroyed by fire between Albany, New York and Troy, New York, a total loss.

=== 21 November ===
List of shipwrecks: 21 November 1896
Ship	State	Description
B. W. Arnold	United States	The steam barge caught fire on Lake Superior 20 miles (32 km) off the Portage Lake Canal, off Ontonagon, Michigan. The crew was forced to go to the barge James Mowatt that she was towing and cut the tow line. She eventually drifted ashore near the mouth of Salmon Trout River and burned to the waterline.
City of Osceola	United States	The passenger steamer struck an obstruction and sank at Craigheads Point, Arkansas 70 miles (110 km) above Memphis, Tennessee. Raised and repaired.

=== 22 November ===
List of shipwrecks: 22 November 1896
Ship	State	Description
Red Wing	United States	The schooner sank after hitting an obstruction 60 miles (97 km) southeast of Pensacola Bay, Florida.
San Benito	United States	The collier went ashore north of Point Arena and broke in two, a total loss. Six lost. Survivors rescued by the United States Life Saving Service and boats from Point Arena and Weott, two swam to shore.

=== 25 November ===
List of shipwrecks: 25 November 1896
Ship	State	Description
Ollie Neville	United States	The steamer sprung a leak and sank over night at East Liverpool, Ohio on the Ohio River. Raised, repaired, and returned to service.

=== 27 November ===
List of shipwrecks: 27 November 1896
Ship	State	Description
Dalles City	United States	The steamer struck a rock and sank at the Mouth of the Windy River. She was raised and taken to Portland, Oregon for repairs.

=== 28 November ===
List of shipwrecks: 28 November 1896
Ship	State	Description
Levi Davis	United States	The steamer was sunk crossing the Cape Fear bar.

=== Unknown date ===
List of shipwrecks: Unknown November 1896
Ship	State	Description
Emma J. Gott	United States	The schooner was heavily damaged and beached when part of her cargo consisting of gasoline exploded at Salem, Massachusetts, fortunately the 300 cases of dynamite on board did not detonate. Her cook suffered burns.

== December ==
=== 1 December ===
List of shipwrecks: 1 December 1896
Ship	State	Description
Blesk	Russia	The steamer, one of the earliest vessels specially constructed to carry oil, hit Greystone rock near Salcombe at full speed (10 knots, 19 km/h, 12 mph). 43 crew were rescued by the Hope Cove Lifeboat, but the wreck was the first large scale ecological oil disaster on UK shores.

=== 3 December ===
List of shipwrecks: 3 December 1896
Ship	State	Description
Helen Smith	United States	The steamer struck a snag and sank in the Elizabeth River off Money Point.

=== 5 December ===
List of shipwrecks: 5 December 1896
Ship	State	Description
Nathan F. Cobb	United States	Nathan F. Cobb The three-masted schooner capsized in the Atlantic Ocean after departing Brunswick, Georgia, and drifted onto the outer sand bar off Ormond Beach, Florida, where she ran aground. Two crewmen and a civilian rescuer were killed during the incident.
Willie M. Stevens	United States	The fishing schooner went ashore at Blanche Point near Port La Tour, Nova Scotia. Crew saved.

=== 8 December ===
List of shipwrecks: 8 December 1896
Ship	State	Description
British Peer	United Kingdom	The sailing ship struck a reef off Saldanha Bay, South Africa, and was wrecked with 471 Indian indentured labourers on board. Eighteen crew were killed; there were only four survivors.

=== 11 December ===
List of shipwrecks: 11 December 1896
Ship	State	Description
Delhi	United States	The barge, under tow of Aries (United States), grounded on Blackwell's Island. She was pulled off and taken to Newtown Creek where she sank.
Marietta	United States	The steamer struck a submerged log in Rancocas Creek and was beached to prevent sinking.

=== 13 December ===
List of shipwrecks: 13 December 1896
Ship	State	Description
Champion	United States	The freighter was destroyed by fire at Preston's Landing, Kentucky on the Big Sandy River.

=== 16 December ===
List of shipwrecks: 16 December 1896
Ship	State	Description
Sarah Gibson	United Kingdom	The 170-ton brigantine was sunk in a collision with trawler Avonmouth (United Kingdom) off Hakin Point, Milford Haven, Wales.

=== 20 December ===
List of shipwrecks: 20 December 1896
Ship	State	Description
Fredonia	United States	The fishing schooner was heavily damaged by a huge sea breaking over her on 18 December drowning one crewman and fatally injuring another. She was abandoned and the survivors taken off on 20 December by the ocean liner Colorado.

=== 22 December ===
List of shipwrecks: 22 December 1896
Ship	State	Description
Ella	United States	The steamer struck a submerged obstruction in a thick snowstorm in Newcastle, Pennsylvania and sank.
Lela	United States	The steamer filled and sank over night lying at Henderson Island in six feet (1.8 m) of water. Later raised.

=== 23 December ===
List of shipwrecks: 23 December 1896
Ship	State	Description
Gen. George G. Meade	United States	The tug was sunk in a collision with the tug Herculus (United States) in the East River off Grand Street, New York.

=== 26 December ===
List of shipwrecks: 26 December 1896
Ship	State	Description
Hustler	United States	The tow steamer was destroyed by fire at Clark's Dock, Jacksonville, Florida.

=== 28 December ===
List of shipwrecks: 28 December 1896
Ship	State	Description
New Brunswick	United States	The ferry caught fire at dock in Jersey City, New Jersey. Attempts to put out the fire failed and she was towed out into the North River, sinking off Liberty Island.

=== 31 December ===
List of shipwrecks: 31 December 1896
Ship	State	Description
Warwick	United Kingdom	During a voyage from Glasgow, Scotland, to St. John, New Brunswick, Canada, carrying general cargo, the 316-foot (96 m), 2,527-gross register ton barquentine-rigged steamer was wrecked in a storm at night on Yellow Murr Ledge, a reef that is part of the Murr Ledges, in the Bay of Fundy off Grand Manan, 3 nautical miles (5.6 km; 3.5 mi) south-southeast of Southwest Head Light at 44°29.0′N 066°51.0′W. Her entire crew of 52 abandoned ship in two lifeboats and was rescued by the fishing schooner George S. Bontwell (United States), which put to sea into the storm from a nearby anchorage to render assistance.

=== Unknown date ===
List of shipwrecks: Unknown date in December 1896
Ship	State	Description
Douro	Brazil	The cargo ship foundered in the Atlantic Ocean off Ouessant, Finistère, France.

== Unknown date ==
List of shipwrecks: Unknown date in 1896
Ship	State	Description
Champion	United Kingdom	The tug was wrecked in the River Clyde sometime in 1896.
Shelter Island	United States	The paddle wheel passenger steamer struck rocks off Key Largo and sank 19 miles (31 km) off Key West, off Loggerhead Key on either 20 January or 20 February.
HMS Vixen	Royal Navy	The wreck of HMS Vixen on 12 July 2010. The accommodations vessel, a former gunboat, was scuttled as a blockship in a narrow channel off Daniel's Head, Bermuda.
