= Reesville =

Reesville may refer to:

- Reesville, Ohio, in the United States
- Reesville, Queensland, in Australia
