= East Clinton High School =

East Clinton Local High School
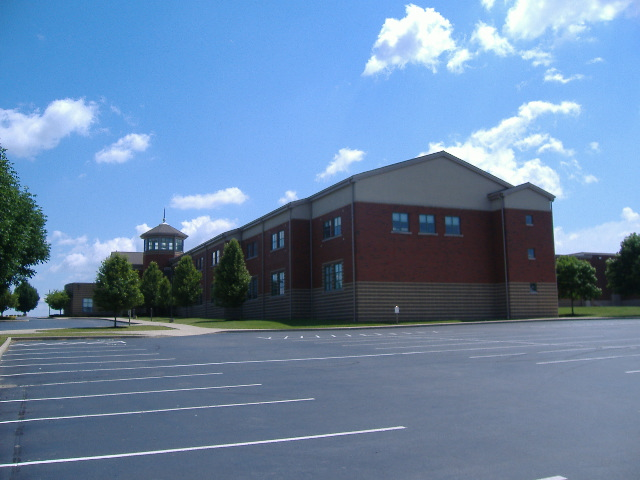
- East Clinton High School in Lees Creek, Ohio

Location
- 174 Larrick Road; Sabina, (Clinton County), Ohio 45169; United States; 39°25′5″N 83°38′54″W

Information
- Other name: East Clinton High School
- School type: Public, Secondary school
- Established: 1966; 60 years ago
- School district: East Clinton Local School District
- NCES District ID: 3904640
- Superintendent: Eric Magee
- CEEB code: 362920
- NCES School ID: 390464002543
- Principal: Kerri Matheny
- Teaching staff: 17.00 (FTE)
- Grades: 9^{th} through 12^{th}
- Gender: Coeducational
- Enrollment: 284 (2024–2025)
- Student to teacher ratio: 16.71
- Campus type: Rural
- Colors: Scarlet and Gray
- Athletics conference: Southern Buckeye Athletic/Academic Conference
- Nickname: Astros
- Rival: Clinton-Massie Falcons
- Communities served: Sabina; New Vienna; Lees Creek; Reesville
- Website: hs.eastclinton.org
- Last updated: August 28, 2019

East Clinton Local High School is a public high school in Sabina, Ohio in the United States. It is the only high school in the East Clinton Local School District. The district was formed in 1966 from two districts of New Kenton Local Schools (formed the year before by combining Simon Kenton Local Schools and New Vienna Local Schools) and Sabina Local Schools. East Clinton Local Schools cover the eastern portion of Clinton County. It serves the students in the townships of Richland, Wayne, Wilson, and Green, as well as the villages of Sabina, Reesville, Lees Creek and New Vienna. The first graduating class was in 1966. Today there are about 1,200 students district wide, averaging approximately 350 at East Clinton High School.

== Athletics ==
East Clinton's athletic teams, known as the Astros, formerly participated in the Fort Ancient Valley Conference (1974–1977) and Scioto Valley Conference. In 2012, East Clinton left the Southern Buckeye Athletic/Academic Conference (SBAAC) to join the South Central Ohio League, only to return to the SBAAC in 2017 upon the latter's closure.

== Schools in East Clinton Local School District ==
School	Nickname	Location	Colors	Year built
East Clinton High School	Astros	Sabina	Gray & Red	1999
East Clinton Middle School	Astros	Sabina	Gray & Red	1928
New Vienna Elementary School	Astros	New Vienna	Gray & Scarlet	1996
Sabina Elementary School	Astros	Sabina	Gray & Scarlet	1996

== Community events ==
On October 27, 2012, U.S. vice presidential candidate and later 54^{th} Speaker of the House Paul Ryan visited the school as part of a campaign rally for his running mate, Mitt Romney. The event was attended by over 700 local residents.
