= List of shipwrecks in August 1885 =

The list of shipwrecks in August 1885 includes ships sunk, foundered, grounded, or otherwise lost during August 1885.

== 1 August ==
List of shipwrecks: 1 August 1885
Ship	State	Description
Dunalistair	United Kingdom	The ship was driven ashore at Skegersta Ness, Isle of Lewis, Outer Hebrides. Her crew were rescued. She was on a voyage from Dundee, Forfarshire to Cardiff, Glamorgan. She had become a wreck by 5 August.

== 2 August ==
List of shipwrecks: 2 August 1885
Ship	State	Description
Unnamed	United Kingdom	A pilot cutter was run into by the steamship Clan Lamont (United Kingdom) and sank in the Clyde. All on board survived.

== 3 August ==
List of shipwrecks: 3 August 1885
Ship	State	Description
Kandy	United Kingdom	The schooner was driven ashore at Carnlough, County Antrim. She was on a voyage from Troon, Ayrshire to Carnlough.
St. Andrew's Bay	United Kingdom	The steamship ran aground in Lough Foyle. She was refloated and taken in to Londonderry.

== 4 August ==
List of shipwrecks: 4 August 1885
Ship	State	Description
Roscius	United Kingdom	The schooner was abandoned in the Irish Sea 6 nautical miles (11 km) off the Hook Lighthouse, County Waterford. Her four crew survived. She was on a voyage from Belfast, County Antrim to Newcastle upon Tyne, Northumberland.

== 5 August ==
List of shipwrecks: 5 August 1885
Ship	State	Description
Humacao	Spain	The steamship was wrecked on the Wallace Ledge, off Grand Manan, New Brunswick, Canada. Her crew were rescued. She was on a voyage from the West Indies to Saint John, New Brunswick. When twelve wreckers later went aboard Humacao to salvage her, however, her wreck broke up, slid off the reef, and sank 3 nautical miles (5.6 km; 3.5 mi) south-southeast of Southwest Head Lighthouse (44°31.9′N 066°52.5′W), killing eleven of the wreckers.
Neptune	United Kingdom	The steamship ran aground on the Holm Sands, in the Humber. She was on a voyage from Hull, Yorkshire to King's Lynn, Norfolk. She was refloated with the assistance of a tug and put back to Hull.
Unnamed	United Kingdom	A barge was run down and sunk at Limehouse, Middlesex by the steamship Anitlles (United Kingdom).

== 7 August ==
List of shipwrecks: 7 August 1885
Ship	State	Description
Hannah	United Kingdom	The brigantine was driven ashore at Yarmouth, Isle of Wight. She was on a voyage from South Shields, County Durham to Plymouth, Devon.
Mary Stewart	United Kingdom	The schooner was run into by the steamship Claymore (United Kingdom) off the Mull of Kintyre, Argyllshire and was severely damaged. She was towed in to Campbeltown, Argyllshire by Claymore.
Sardinian	United Kingdom	The steamship ran aground in the Saint Lawrence River downstream of Montreal, Quebec, Canada. She was refloated and taken in to Quebec City.

== 9 August ==
List of shipwrecks: 9 August 1885
Ship	State	Description
Hermann Friedrich	Germany	The ship was sighted whilst on a voyage from Liverpool, Lancashire, United Kingdom eo Wilmington, Delaware, United States. No further trace,. reported missing.
Oakland	United Kingdom	The steamship collided with the despatch vessel Blitz (Germany) and sank in the Kattegat with the loss of fifteen of her crew.

== 10 August ==
List of shipwrecks: 10 August 1885
Ship	State	Description
George and Susan	United States	The whaling bark dragged her anchor, collided with the whaling bark Mabel (United States), and was driven ashore and wrecked in Wainwright Inlet on the Chukchi Sea coast of the District of Alaska. The revenue cutter USRC Thomas Corwin ( United States Revenue-Marine) rescued all but three members of the crews of George and Susan and Mabel.
Mabel	United States	The whaling, bark was lost after the whaling bark George and Susan (United States) dragged her anchor and collided with herWainwright Inlet on the Chukchi Sea coast of the District of Alaska. The revenue cutter USRC Thomas Corwin ( United States Revenue-Marine) rescued all but three members of the crews of George and Susan and Mabel.

== 11 August ==
List of shipwrecks: 11 August 1885
Ship	State	Description
Batley	United Kingdom	The steamship struck the pier at Fécamp, Seine-Inférieure, France and was damaged. She put back to Fécamp.

== 12 August ==
List of shipwrecks: 12 August 1885
Ship	State	Description
Octavia Stella	Italy	The barque ran aground in the Helford River. She was refloated with the assistance of a tug but ran aground again. She was refloated the next day.
Welcome Home	United Kingdom	The Thames barge collided with the steamship Hilda and sank in the River Thames. Her crew survived.
Unnamed	Flag unknown	A barque was driven ashore on Flat Holm, in the Bristol Channel.
Unknown	Flag unknown	The ship was wrecked on the Welsh Grounds, in the Bristol Channel. Three crew were rescued by the Clevedon Lifeboat.

== 13 August ==
List of shipwrecks: 13 August 1885
Ship	State	Description
City of Quebec	United Kingdom	The ship ran aground in the River Ouse near Goole, Yorkshire. She was on a voyage from Talcahuano, Mexico to Goole.
Edgworth	United Kingdom	The steamship was run into by the steamship Isis (United Kingdom) and sank in the North Sea off the Newarp Lightship ( Trinity House) with the loss of a crew member. Edgworth was on a voyage from Bilbao, Spain to Middlesbrough, Yorkshire.
Unnamed	United Kingdom	A barge was driven ashore at Lossiemouth, Moray.
Unnamed	United Kingdom	A fishing boat sank in the North Sea off the coast of Aberdeenshire with the loss of all seven crew.
Unnamed	United Kingdom	A fishing boat foundered in the North Sea off the coast of Caithness with the loss of all five crew.

== 14 August ==
List of shipwrecks: 14 August 1885
Ship	State	Description
Crystal	United Kingdom	The steamship ran aground on the Gunfleet Sand, in the North Sea off the coast of Essex. She was on a voyage from London to Leith, Lothian. She was refloated with assistance and resumed her voyage.
Georg	Norway	The barque was abandoned in the North Sea (56°00′N 5°25′E). Her crew were rescued by the steamship Onward (United Kingdom). Georg was on a voyage from Örnsköldsvik, Sweden to Saint-Nazaire, Loire-Inférieure, France.

== 15 August ==
List of shipwrecks: 15 August 1885
Ship	State	Description
City of Manatee	United States	The ship sank off Pickens Point, Pensacola, Florida.

== 16 August ==
List of shipwrecks: 16 August 1885
Ship	State	Description
Ernst Wilhelm	United Kingdom	The ship was driven ashore on Hartsmal Island, Outer Hebrides. She was on a voyage from Newport, Monmouthshire to Copenhagen, Denmark.

== 18 August ==
List of shipwrecks: 18 August 1885
Ship	State	Description
Forsoget	Norway	The barque sailed from Quebec City, Canada for Grimsby, Lincolnshire, United Kingdom on 29 July 1885, and was abandoned in position 44°N 41°W in the Atlantic Ocean on 18 August. Her crew were rescued by Albion (United Kingdom) and landed at Liverpool on 4 September. The waterlogged hulk was seen, still drifting, on 27 October in position 44.47°N 27.10°W.

== 20 August ==
List of shipwrecks: 20 August 1885
Ship	State	Description
Haddingtonshire	United Kingdom	The barque became a total wreck off Point Reyes, California, United States with the loss of eighteen of her twenty crew. She was on a voyage from Portland, Oregon, United States to Liverpool, Lancashire.

== 21 August ==
List of shipwrecks: 21 August 1885
Ship	State	Description
USS Ammonoosuc	United States Navy	After a fire that began aboard the decommissioned steam frigate USS Colorado (United States Navy) spread to her, the decommissioned steam frigate burned to the waterline and sank off Plum Beach near Port Washington, Long Island, New York, while being stripped prior to scrapping.
USS Colorado	United States Navy	A fire lit by salvors on her forward deck to burn boards so that iron spikes could be recovered from them went out of control, and the decommissioned screw frigate burned to the waterline and sank off Plum Beach near Port Washington, Long Island, New York, while being stripped prior to scrapping.
USS Congress	United States Navy	After a fire that began aboard the decommissioned steam frigate USS Colorado (United States Navy) spread to her, the decommissioned screw sloop burned to the waterline and sank off Plum Beach near Port Washington, Long Island, New York, while being stripped prior to scrapping.
Cornwallis	United Kingdom	The whaler, a barque, was crushed by ice and sank in the Davis Strait. Her crew survived.
Fairplay	United States	After a fire that began aboard the decommissioned steam frigate USS Colorado (United States Navy) spread to her, the ship burned to the waterline and sank off Plum Beach near Port Washington, Long Island, New York, while being stripped prior to scrapping.
Lotta Grant	United States	After a fire that began aboard the decommissioned steam frigate USS Colorado (United States Navy) spread to her, the ship burned to the waterline and sank off Plum Beach near Port Washington, Long Island, New York, while being stripped prior to scrapping.
USS Minnesota	United States Navy	After a fire that began aboard the decommissioned steam frigate USS Colorado (United States Navy) spread to the ship — an unidentified ship described by the press as a decommissioned U.S. Navy ship named "USS Minnesota" — and she burned to the waterline and sank off Plum Beach near Port Washington, Long Island, New York, while being stripped prior to scrapping.
USS Susquehanna	United States Navy	After a fire that began aboard the decommissioned steam frigate USS Colorado (United States Navy) spread to her, the decommissioned steam frigate burned to the waterline and sank off Plum Beach near Port Washington, Long Island, New York, while being stripped prior to scrapping.
USS South Carolina	United States Navy	After a fire that began aboard the decommissioned steam frigate USS Colorado (United States Navy) spread to the ship — an unidentified ship described by the press as a decommissioned U.S. Navy ship named "USS South Carolina" — and burned to the waterline and sank off Plum Beach near Port Washington, Long Island, New York, while being stripped prior to scrapping.

== 22 August ==
List of shipwrecks: 22 August 1885
Ship	State	Description
Labrador	United Kingdom	The ship was sighted off Bic, Quebec, Canada whilst on a voyage from Quebec City to Newcastle upon Tyne, Northumberland. No further trace, reported missing.
Lincoln	United States	The ship was wrecked at "El Arrastrathdero", Mexico.

== 25 August ==
List of shipwrecks: 25 August 1885
Ship	State	Description
Catherine Chalmers	United Kingdom	The ship was driven ashore in a hurricane at Savannah, Georgia, United States. She was refloated and found to be severely leaky. She was subsequently taken in to Savannah in a waterlogged condition.
Flid	Norway	The barque was in collision with two other vessels and drove ashore in a hurricane at Charleston, South Carolina, United States.
Marion	United Kingdom	The steamship was driven ashore in a hurricane at Savannah. She was refloated with the assistance of a tug.
Meddor	United Kingdom	The barque was wrecked in a hurricane at Charleston.
N. Mosher	Canada	The barque was driven ashore in a hurricane at Savannah.
Propitious	United Kingdom	The steamship struck the quayside at Sunderland, County Durham and was severely damaged. She was on a voyage from Sunderland to Savona, Italy. She put back to Sunderland for repairs.

== 26 August ==
List of shipwrecks: 26 August 1885
Ship	State	Description
Achilles	United Kingdom	The steamship ran aground at Grimsby, Lincolnshire.

== 27 August ==
List of shipwrecks: 27 August 1885
Ship	State	Description
Ange Gardieu	France	The ship was driven ashore and severely damaged at Caloe Point, Morbihan. She was on a voyage from Cardiff, Glamorgan, United Kingdom to Vannes, Morbihan.

== 30 August ==
List of shipwrecks: 30 August 1885
Ship	State	Description
Herald	Canada	The ship was sighted off "New Anjer", Netherlands East Indies whilst on a voyage from Philadelphia, Pennsylvania, United States to Hiogo, Japan. No further trace, reported missing.

== 31 August ==
List of shipwrecks: 31 August 1885
Ship	State	Description
Dorothea, and Resolute	Denmark; United Kingdom	The schooner Dorothera broke from her moorings at Great Yarmouth and collided with the steamship Resolute, which was forced from her moorings. Both vessels became wedged under the Haven Bridge and were severely damaged.
Sigrid	Norway	The ship struck a sunken wreck and foundered in the Dogger Bank with the loss of all but one of her crew. The survivor was rescued by the fishing smack Albatross (United Kingdom). Sigrid was on a voyage from London, United Kingdom to Kotka, Grand Duchy of Finland.
Wakefield	United Kingdom	The steamship caught fire and was beached on the Spijkerplaat, off the coast of Zeeland, Netherlands. Her passengers were taken off. She was on a voyage from Grimsby, Lincolnshire to Antwerp, Belgium. The fire was extinguished and she was refloated.

== Unknown date ==
List of shipwrecks: Unknown date in August 1885
Ship	State	Description
Activ	Norway	The barque was abandoned in the Atlantic Ocean before 6 August.
Adelheid	Germany	The schooner was driven ashore and wrecked at Thisted, Denmark.
Albert	France	The steamship was wrecked on the Île de Batz, Finistère.
Amandus	Germany	The galiot was driven ashore and wrecked at Lemvig, Denmark. She was on a voyage from Papenburg to Königsberg.
Annie	United Kingdom	The steamship ran aground at Bordeaux, Gironde, France.
Architect	United Kingdom	The steamship was driven ashore at Pensacola, Florida, United States. She was on a voyage from Pensacola to Liverpool, Lancashire.
Attilio	United Kingdom	The ship was driven ashore at Akyab, Burma.
Aurora	Italy	The brig was driven ashore on Heligoland. She subsequently sank but her crew were rescued. She was on a voyage from the west coast of Africa to Harburg, Germany.
Azalea	United Kingdom	The steamship ran aground in the Sligo River. She was refloated on 4 August and taken in to Sligo.
Billy	Germany	The barque was wrecked on a reef in Spanish East Indies waters. Her crew were rescued.
British Statesman	United Kingdom	The steamship was wrecked before 19 August with much loss of life. There were ten survivors; seventeen people were reported missing.
Burdwan	United Kingdom	The ship was wrecked in the Macclesfield Straits before 24 August. Her crew were rescue.
Chatsworth	United Kingdom	The steamship ran aground at Quillebeuf-sur-Seine, Seine-Inférieure, France. She was on a voyage from Rouen, Seine-Inférieure to Santander, Spain. She was refloated with assistance.
Cilurnum	United Kingdom	The full-rigged ship caught fire at sea and was abandoned with the loss of a crew member. She was on a voyage from the River Tyne to San Francisco, California.
Clan Matheson	United Kingdom	The steamship ran aground in the Suez Canal. She was on a voyage from the Clyde to Calcutta, India. She was refloated.
Comet	United Kingdom	The ship was driven ashore 3 nautical miles (5.6 km) north of Ballantrae, Ayrshire.
Dryad	United Kingdom	The schooner ran aground in Carnarvon Bay. She was on a voyage from Jersey, Channel Islands to Liverpool.
Elise	France	The schooner foundered off Ibiza, Spain. She was on a voyage from Marseille, Bouches-du-Rhône to Bayonne, Loire-Inférieure.
Elizabeth	United Kingdom	The schooner was driven ashore and wrecked at Islandmagee, County Antrim. Her crew were rescued. She was on a voyage from Belfast to Larne.
Embla	United Kingdom	The steamship ran aground at Grangemouth, Stirlingshire. She was refloated and resumed her voyage.
Felix	Sweden	The ship was wrecked at Gothenburg.
Granville	United Kingdom	The steamship was driven ashore on Storgrundet, in the Luleå Archipelago, Sweden. She was refloated and resumed her voyage.
James Groves	United Kingdom	The steamship was driven ashore on Saltholmen, Denmark. She was on a voyage from Söderhamn, Sweden to West Hartlepool, County Durham.
Jarvis Lord	United States	The lake freighter sank in Lake Michigan on 17 or 18 August. Her crew survived. She was on a voyage from St. Ignace, Michigan to Chicago, Illinois.
Johannes	Russia	The schooner was driven ashore at Fort Ruyter, Zeeland, Netherlands. She was on a voyage from Ghent, East Flanders, Belgium to Riga.
John Samuels	United Kingdom	The smack was driven ashore and wrecked at Islandmagee. Her crew were rescued.
Julie	Germany	The brig was driven ashore at "Sandrus", Denmark. She was on a voyage from Hamburg to Gävle, Sweden.
M. A. Dixon	China	The steamship was wrecked at Kaohsiung, Taiwan. All on board were rescued.
Panormos	Ottoman Empire	The ship collided with an Italian ship in the Sea of Marmara and was severely damaged. She put in to Gallipoli, and was subsequently towed in to Constantinople.
Peer of the Realm	United Kingdom	The barque was wrecked on Lundy Island, Devon. The wreck was towed in to Penarth, Glamorgan on 14 August.
Phineas P. Henderson	United States	The ship was destroyed by fire at Manila, Spanish East Indies.
Raven	United Kingdom	The sloop was abandoned in the River Mersey at New Brighton, Cheshire. The tug Pathfinder subsequently put two people on board, but she capsized with their loss. Raven was on a voyage from Rhyl, Denbighshire to Runcorn, Cheshire.
Rogaland	Norway	The barque capsized in a hurricane in the Atlantic Ocean with the loss of five of her nine crew. Survivors took to a raft; they were rescued a few days later, on 12 August, by the barque John R. Stanhope (United States). Rogaland was on a voyage from West Bay, Nova Scotia, Canada to Conway, Caernarfonshire, United Kingdom.
Salvador	Brazil	The steamship collided with the steamship Memnon (United Kingdom) and sank.
Sjælland	Denmark	The steamship ran aground in the Scheldt. She was on a voyage from Antwerp, Belgium to Saint Petersburg, Russia. She was refloated and resumed her voyage, but pu tin to Helsingør in a leaky condition.
Stanley	United Kingdom	The Thames barge collided with the steamship Tern (United Kingdom) and sank in the Yantlet Creek.
Tangier	United Kingdom	The steamship ran aground in the Great Bitter Lake. She was on a voyage from Bushire, Persia to London. She was refloated and resumed her voyage.
Tomma	Sweden	The schooner was driven ashore. She was on a voyage from Oskarshamn to Newcastle upon Tyne, Northumberland, United Kingdom. She was refloated and put in to Gothenburg in a leaky condition.
Tunstall	United Kingdom	The steamship was wrecked on the Baldayo Bank, off the north coast of Spain. She was on a voyage from London to Yokohama, Japan.
Vision	United Kingdom	The ship was wrecked in Wick Bay. Her crew were rescued.
Washington	Norway	The brig was abandoned in the North Sea. Her crew were rescued by the steamship Nicosian (United Kingdom). Washington was on a voyage from Fredrikshavn, Denmark to Bo'ness, Lothian, United Kingdom.
Wendola	Germany	The schooner ran aground and was severely damaged. She was on a voyage from Neder Kalix, Sweden to Cowes, Isle of Wight, United Kingdom. She was refloated and towed in to Stockholm, Sweden in a waterlogged condition.
Willy	Germany	The barque was wrecked on the Fiery Cross Reef, in the Indian Ocean. Her crew were rescued. She was on a voyage from Hong Kong to Havre de Grâce, Seine-Inférieure, France.
Unnamed	India	A buggalow was wrecked in the Gulf of Aden before 25 August with the loss of more than 100 lives.
