= Lees Creek, Ohio =

Unincorporated community in Ohio, U.S.

Coordinates: 39°25′12″N 83°38′58″W

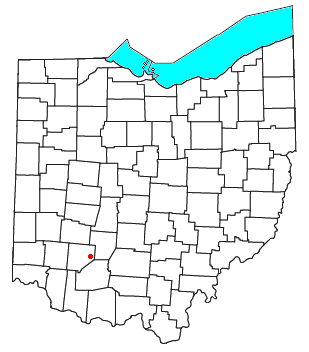
Location of Lees Creek, Ohio

Lees Creek, also known as Centerville, is an unincorporated community in central Wayne Township, Clinton County, Ohio, United States. It lies at the intersection of State Route 729 with Cox Road, 6 miles (9½ km) south of Sabina and 12 miles (19 km) southeast of Wilmington, the county seat of Clinton County. It lies between the headwaters of the Middle Fork of Lees Creek, to the southeast, and the Anderson Fork of Caesar Creek. it had a post office, with the ZIP code 45138. The Post Office closed in 2012 and the town, including East Clinton High School, now carries a Sabina mailing address.

Lees Creek is home to East Clinton Middle School and East Clinton High School.

== History ==
Lees Creek was originally called Centerville, and under the latter name was laid out in 1816. A post office called Lees Creek has been in operation since 1819. The present name comes from nearby Lees Creek.

== Gallery ==
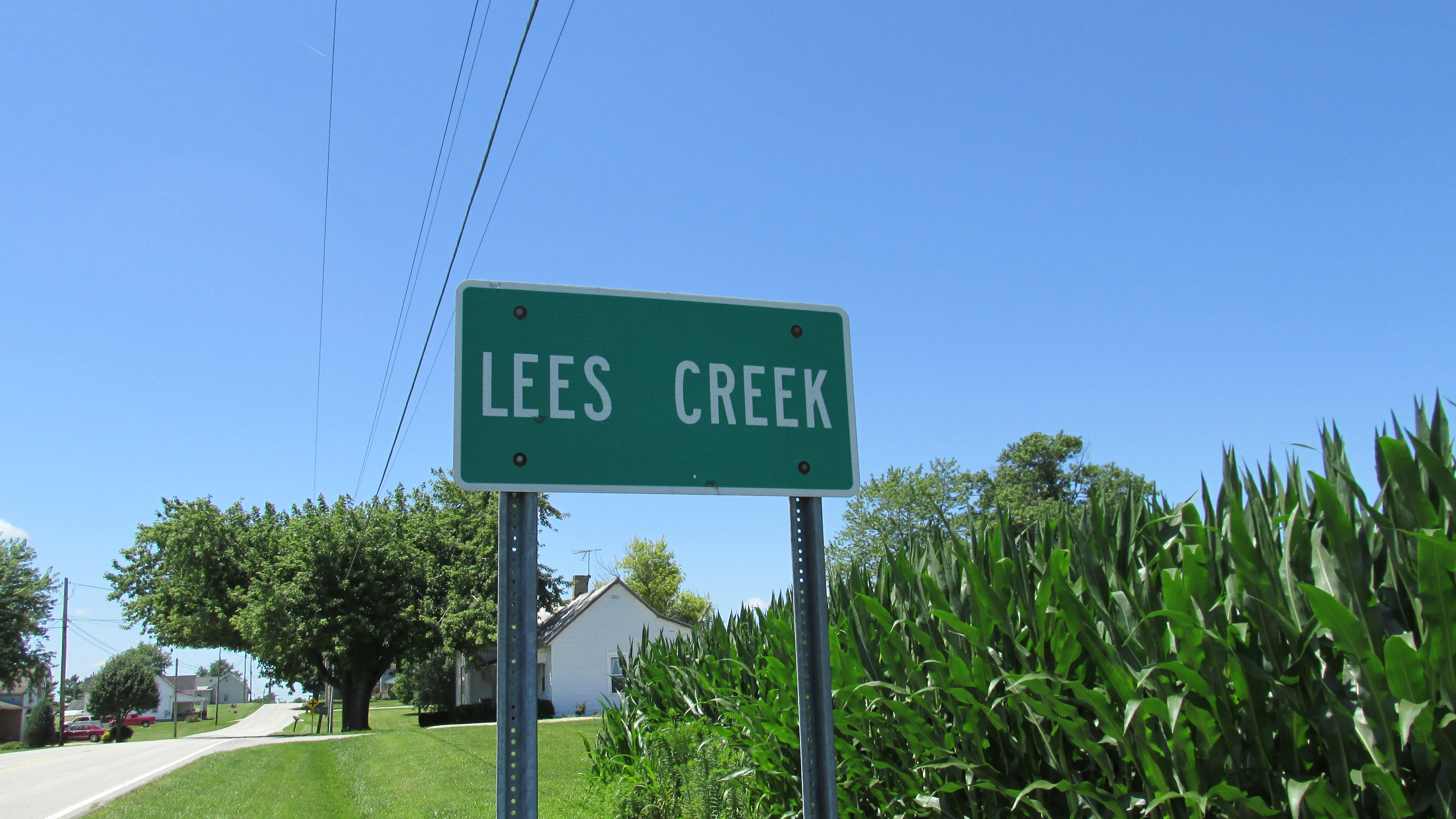
Lees Creek community sign

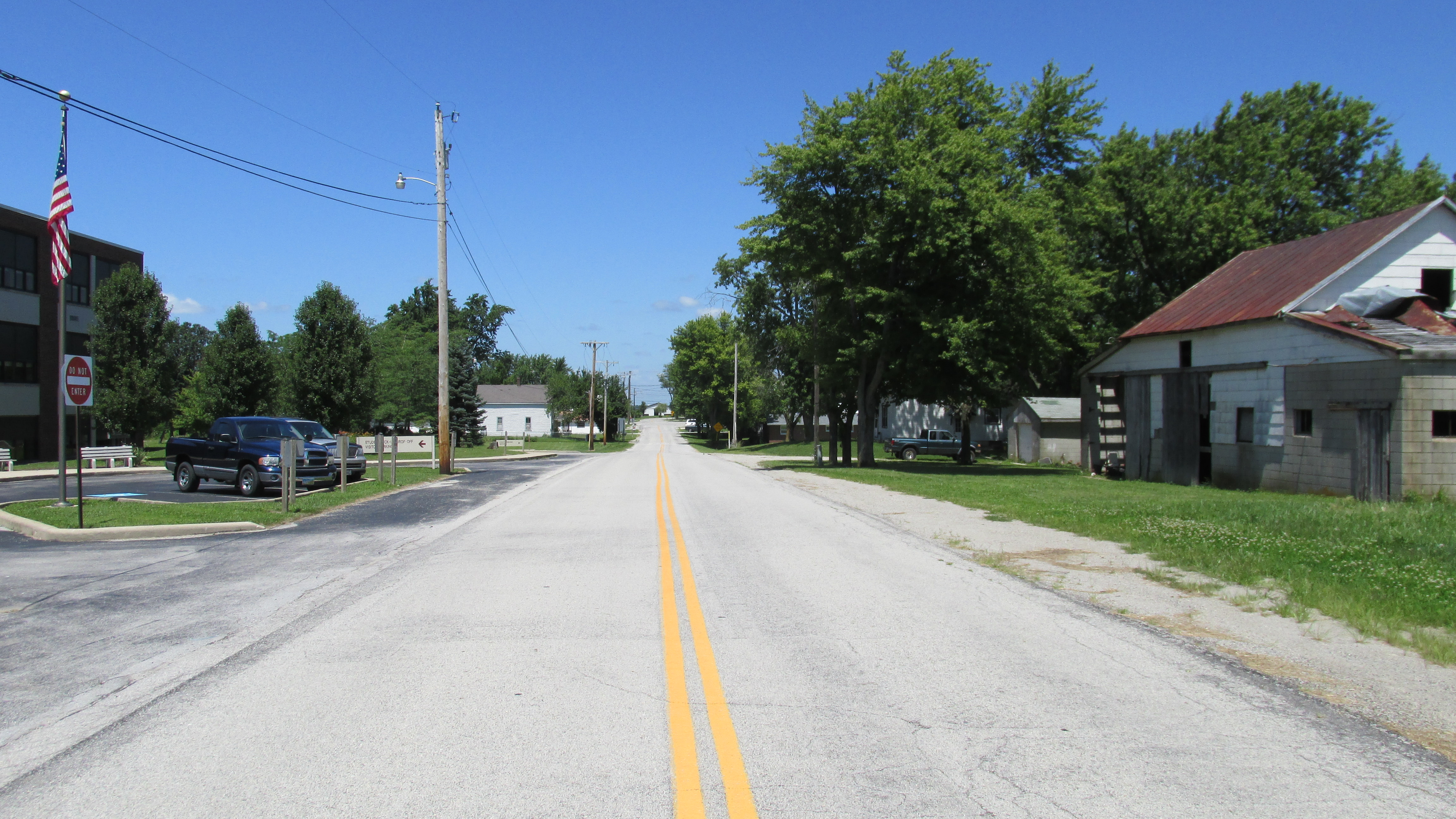
Looking north on Larrick Road in Lees Creek
