= Sarah Doan La Fetra =

American temperance worker (1843–1919)

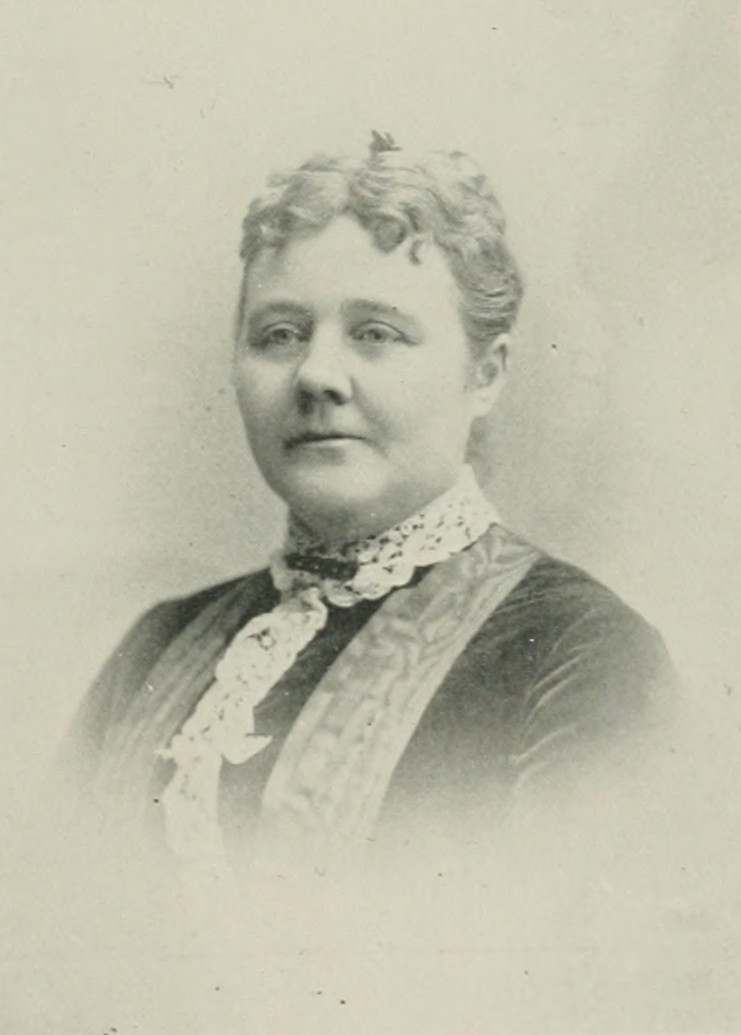
Portrait photo from A Woman of the Century

Sarah Doan La Fetra (June 11, 1843 - May 7, 1919) was an American temperance worker.

== Biography ==
Sarah Doan was born in Sabina, Ohio, on June 11, 1843, the fourth daughter of the Rev. Timothy Doan and Mary Ann Custis. Her mother was a member of the famous Virginia Custis family, and her father was a Methodist minister.

She prepared herself for teaching in the normal school of Professor Holbrook in Lebanon, Ohio. Doan taught in the public schools of Fayette County, Ohio.

In 1867 she married George H. La Fetra, of Warren County, who served three years in the army in the 39th Ohio Volunteers, and after accepted a position under his cousin, Hon. James Harlan, then Secretary of the Interior. The La Fetras had three sons, the youngest of whom died in infancy. The elder, Dr. Linnaeus E. La Fetra, graduated from Wesleyan University, of Middletown, Connecticut, and from the College of Physicians and Surgeons of New York City, first honors of his class. He became a physician in one of the largest hospitals of New York City. The other surviving son was Edwin S. La Fetra, graduated from Princeton College.

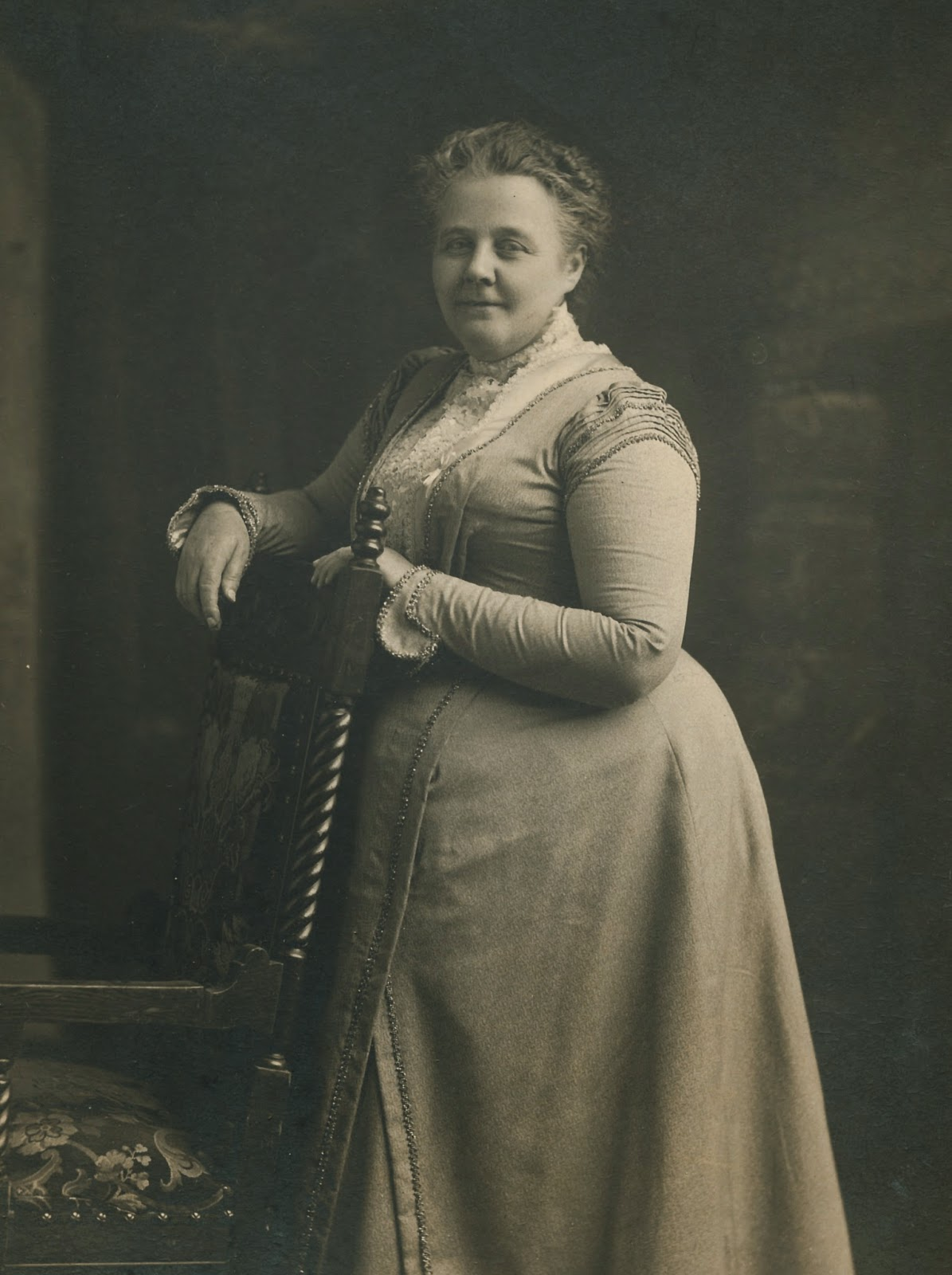
Sarah Doan La Fetra

In 1876 she became member of the Woman's Christian Temperance Union and in 1885 Sarah La Fetra was elected President of the Woman's Christian Temperance Union, District of Columbia. Under her leadership the District Union grew into a felt power. She was also for years the President of the Ladies' Aid Society of the Metropolitan M. E. Church, of Washington, and the President of the Woman's Foreign Missionary Society of that church. She was the President of the District of Columbia Branch of the Society of Loyal Women of American Liberty, and the Third National Vice-President of this Society. She was one of the founders of the Florence Crittendon Hope and Help Mission in Washington. The Baltimore branch of the Woman's Foreign Society erected a building at Bidar, India, called "The Sarah D. La Fetra Memorial", in recognition of her effective labors in that society. She was a practical business woman, and for years fought the rum traffic in a sure and substantial way, by successfully managing a temperance hotel and cafe in the very heart of the city of Washington. She was a suffragist, although not identified with the organization.

She was a businesswoman who for several years opposed the liquor trade by managing a temperance hotel and café in the center of Washington, D.C. She also supported women's suffrage, although she was not formally associated with suffrage organizations.
