= Sabina, Ohio =

- Village
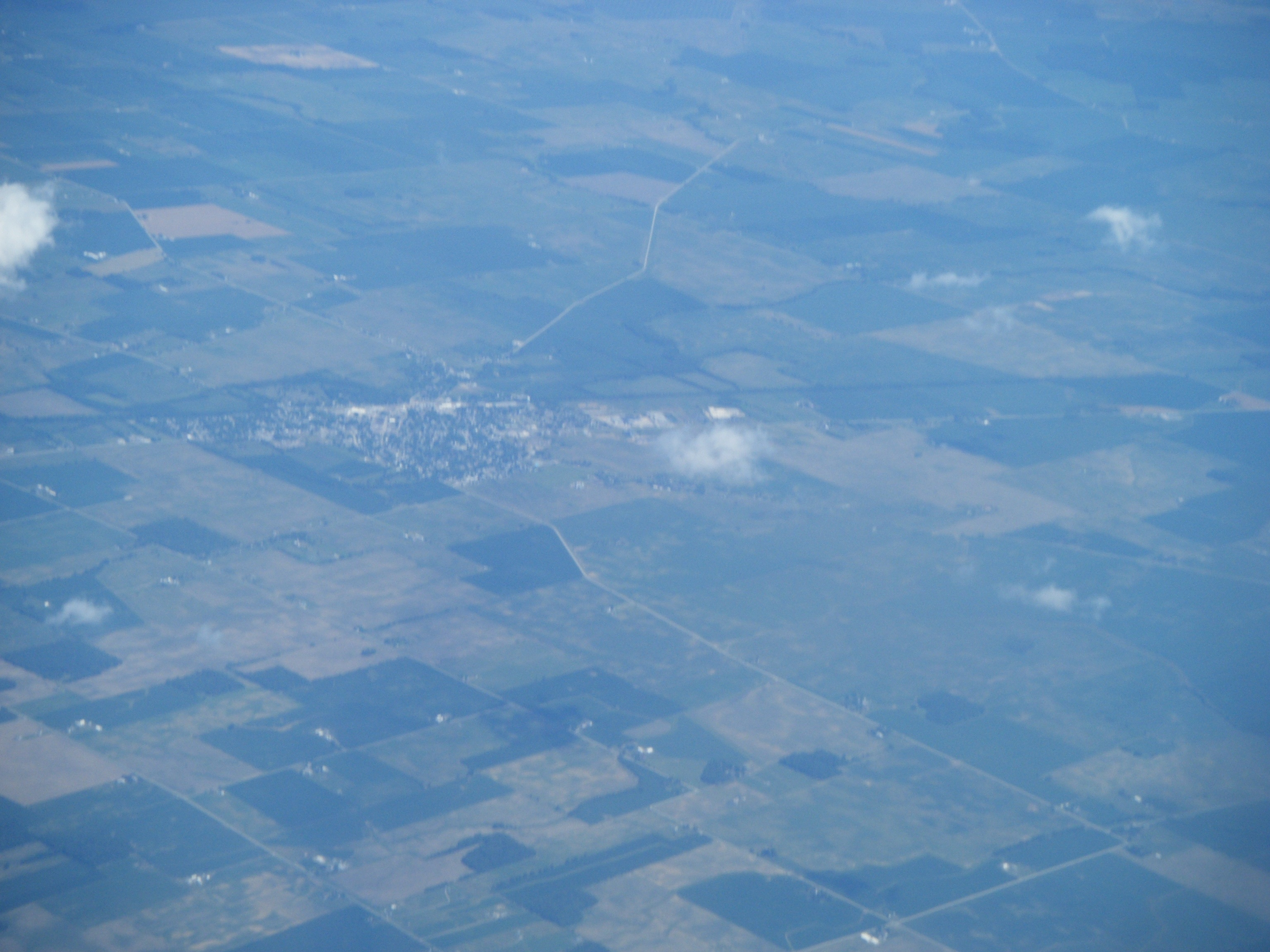
- Aerial view of Sabina
- Nickname: The Eden of Ohio
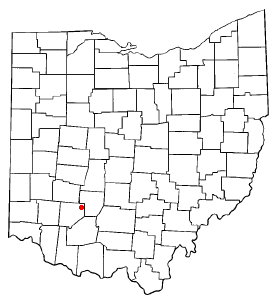
- Location of Sabina, Ohio

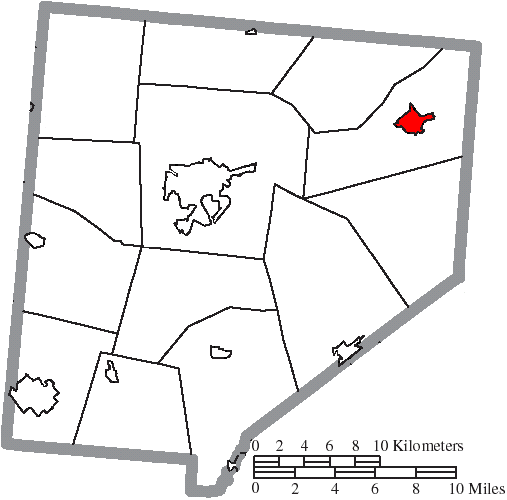
- Location of Sabina in Clinton County
- Coordinates: 39°29′35″N 83°38′00″W
- Country: United States
- State: Ohio
- County: Clinton

Government
  - Mayor: Danielle Johnson

Area
  - Total: 1.19 sq mi (3.07 km^{2})
  - Land: 1.18 sq mi (3.05 km^{2})
  - Water: 0.0077 sq mi (0.02 km^{2})
- Elevation: 1,047 ft (319 m)

Population (2020)
  - Total: 2,499
  - Density: 2,124.9/sq mi (820.41/km^{2})
- Time zone: UTC-5 (Eastern (EST))
  - Summer (DST): UTC-4 (EDT)
- ZIP code: 45169
- Area codes: 937, 326
- FIPS code: 39-69400
- GNIS feature ID: 2399152
- Website: sabinaohio.us

Sabina (/səˈbaɪnə/ sə-BY-nə) is a village in Clinton County, Ohio, United States. As of the 2020 census, the village had a total population of 2,499.

== History ==
The town of Sabina was laid out by Warren Sabin, after whom it was named, in 1830, on land originally entered by P. Neville. The original plat of the town was recorded on December 6, 1830, and contained thirty-seven lots. By 1833, Sabina contained two stores and two taverns.

In 1859, the town was incorporated, and M. Morris appointed Mayor.

A group of archaeological sites known as the Beam Farm Woodland Archaeological District is located along Stone Road near the village. Once inhabited by Adenan and Hopewellian peoples, the district is listed on the National Register of Historic Places.

== Geography ==
Sabina is located along Routes 22 and 3 about ten miles east of Wilmington, the county seat. It is also located within an hour's drive of the Columbus, Dayton, and Cincinnati metro areas.

According to the United States Census Bureau, the village has a total area of 1.29 square miles (3.34 km^{2}), of which 1.28 square miles (3.32 km^{2}) is land and 0.01 square miles (0.03 km^{2}) is water.

Sabina is located 31 miles south of Springfield and 47 miles southwest of Columbus.

== Parks ==
Sabina contains 2 parks within its boundaries. Clinton-Fayette Friendship Trail starts at Melvin road and continues through Sabina ending at Borum RD. There is parking at Melvin, Reesville, Sabina park and at Borum road.

The Sabina Park contains a shelter house with handicap accessible seating, playground equipment, and a walking path. There is a connecting path over a footbridge to the Richland Township park.

== Demographics ==
Historical population
Census	Pop.	Note	%±
1860	255		—
1880	757		—
1890	1,080		42.7%
1900	1,481		37.1%
1910	1,514		2.2%
1920	1,504		−0.7%
1930	1,296		−13.8%
1940	1,525		17.7%
1950	1,696		11.2%
1960	2,313		36.4%
1970	2,160		−6.6%
1980	2,799		29.6%
1990	2,662		−4.9%
2000	2,780		4.4%
2010	2,564		−7.8%
2020	2,499		−2.5%
Population 1900-2010.

=== 2010 census ===
As of the census of 2010, there were 2,564 people, 1,028 households, and 676 families living in the village. The population density was 2,003.1 inhabitants per square mile (773.4/km^{2}). There were 1,160 housing units at an average density of 906.3 per square mile (349.9/km^{2}). The racial makeup of the village was 97.0% White, 0.9% African American, 0.3% Native American, 0.3% Asian, 0.2% from other races, and 1.4% from two or more races. Hispanic or Latino of any race were 0.9% of the population.

There were 1,028 households, of which 32.4% had children under the age of 18 living with them, 44.2% were married couples living together, 14.6% had a female householder with no husband present, 7.0% had a male householder with no wife present, and 34.2% were non-families. 28.0% of all households were made up of individuals, and 9.6% had someone living alone who was 65 years of age or older. The average household size was 2.45 and the average family size was 2.96.

The median age in the village was 38.5 years. 24.2% of residents were under the age of 18; 8.9% were between the ages of 18 and 24; 24% were from 25 to 44; 27.5% were from 45 to 64; and 15.4% were 65 years of age or older. The gender makeup of the village was 48.7% male and 51.3% female.

=== 2000 census ===
As of the census of 2000, there were 2,780 people, 1,075 households, and 762 families living in the village. The population density was 2,149.6 inhabitants per square mile (830.0/km^{2}). There were 1,173 housing units at an average density of 907.0 per square mile (350.2/km^{2}). The racial makeup of the village was 97.48% White, 0.61% African American, 0.29% Native American, 0.43% Asian, 0.07% from other races, and 1.12% from two or more races. Hispanic or Latino of any race were 1.15% of the population.

There were 1,075 households, out of which 35.9% had children under the age of 18 living with them, 49.4% were married couples living together, 14.6% had a female householder with no husband present, and 29.1% were non-families. 24.1% of all households were made up of individuals, and 9.2% had someone living alone who was 65 years of age or older. The average household size was 2.54 and the average family size was 2.98.

In the village, the population was spread out, with 27.4% under the age of 18, 10.5% from 18 to 24, 29.5% from 25 to 44, 20.1% from 45 to 64, and 12.5% who were 65 years of age or older. The median age was 34 years. For every 100 females there were 94.1 males. For every 100 females age 18 and over, there were 93.0 males.

The median income for a household in the village was $34,233, and the median income for a family was $35,795. Males had a median income of $31,556 versus $21,448 for females. The per capita income for the village was $16,481. About 11.8% of families and 12.9% of the population were below the poverty line, including 18.6% of those under age 18 and 7.5% of those age 65 or over.

== Public services ==
=== Health care ===
Sabina is about twelve miles from Clinton Memorial Hospital in Wilmington. This hospital operates the Sabina Health Center located east of town. As well, Fayette County Memorial Hospital is located twelve miles east in Washington Court House.

=== Utilities ===
Sabina is covered by the Sabina Telephone Exchange and Sabina Post Office which serves Clinton, Fayette and Greene counties. Sabina is also home to the Sabina Community Pool, Richland Township Park, and Sabina Village Park.

=== Education ===
Sabina is home of the East Clinton Local School District. East Clinton High School and Middle School are located about 5 miles south of town in Lees Creek. Sabina Elementary is located in village limits with around 400 students. Students in portions of the Fayette County area of Sabina attend Miami Trace High School. A few Sabina area students also attend Greeneview High School in nearby Jamestown, Ohio. Sabina is also home to the Sabina Public Library. The library serves the residents of Sabina and surrounding townships. Additionally, Sabina Public Library operates its New Vienna branch library in New Vienna, Ohio.

== Notable people ==
- Mike Carey, U.S. representative for Ohio
- Don DeVoe, college basketball coach
- John A. T. Hull, U.S. representative from Iowa
- Sarah Doan La Fetra, temperance worker

== Gallery ==
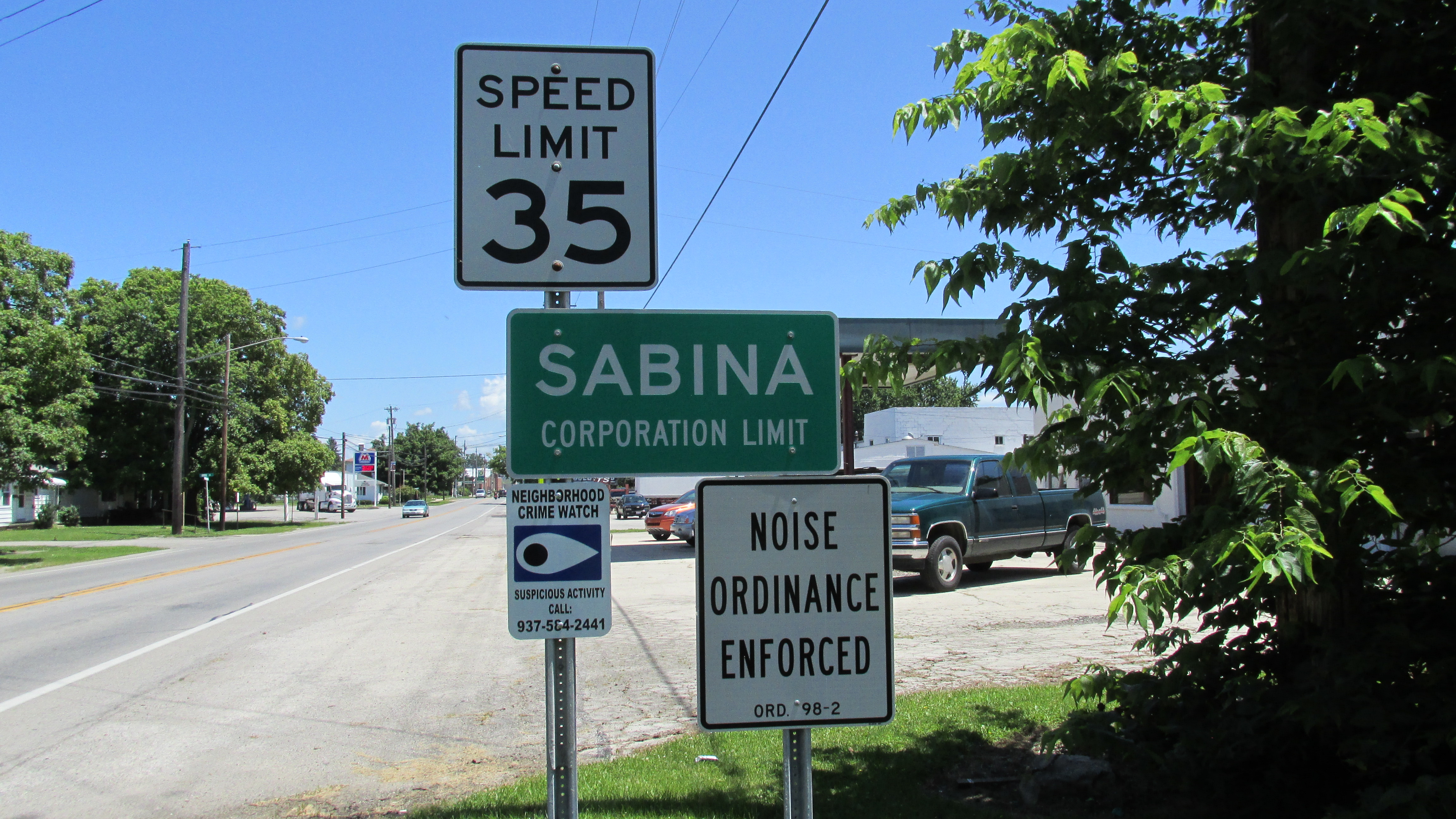
Sabina corporation limit sign

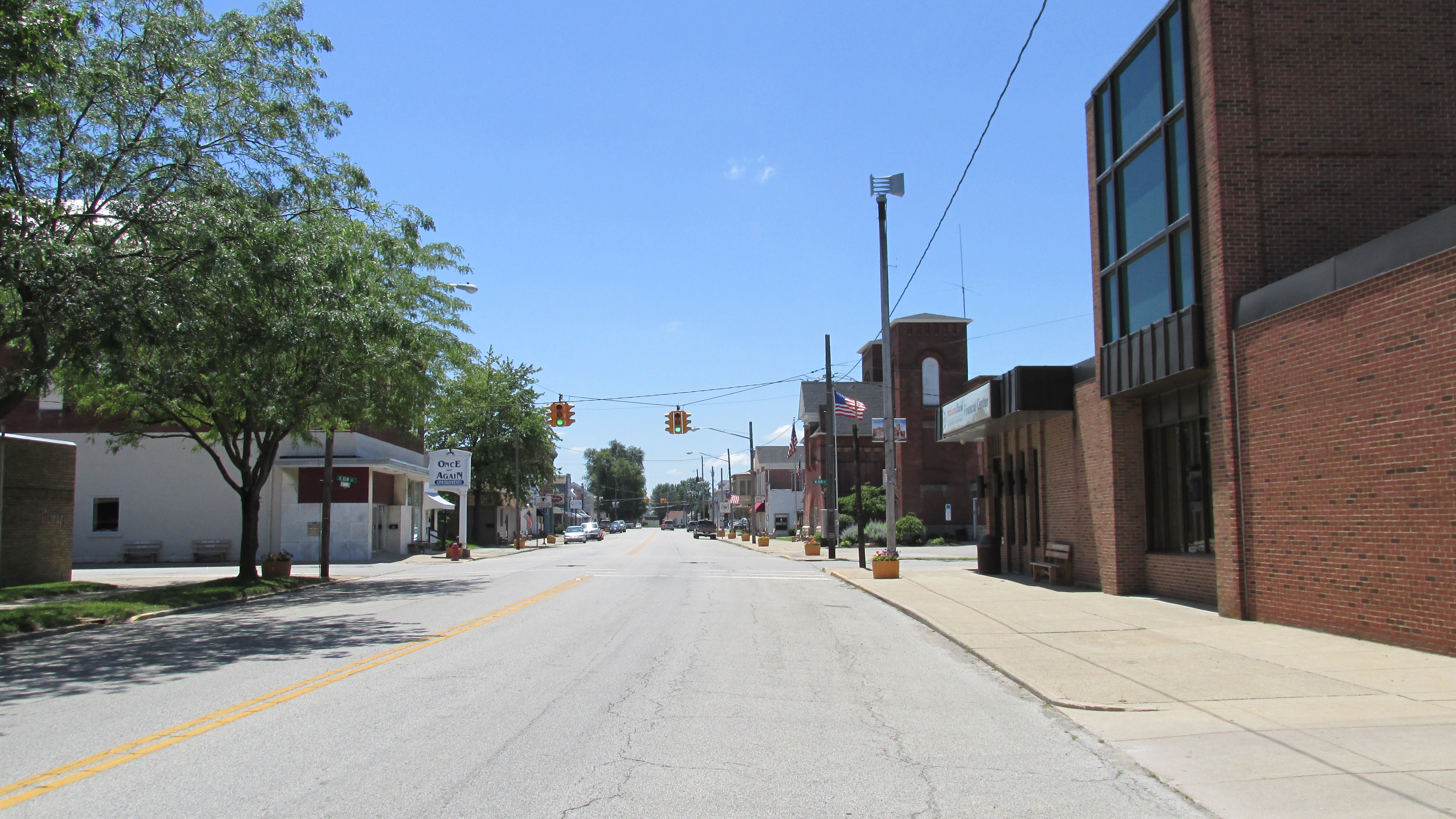
Looking south on North Howard Street (Ohio State Route 729) in Sabina

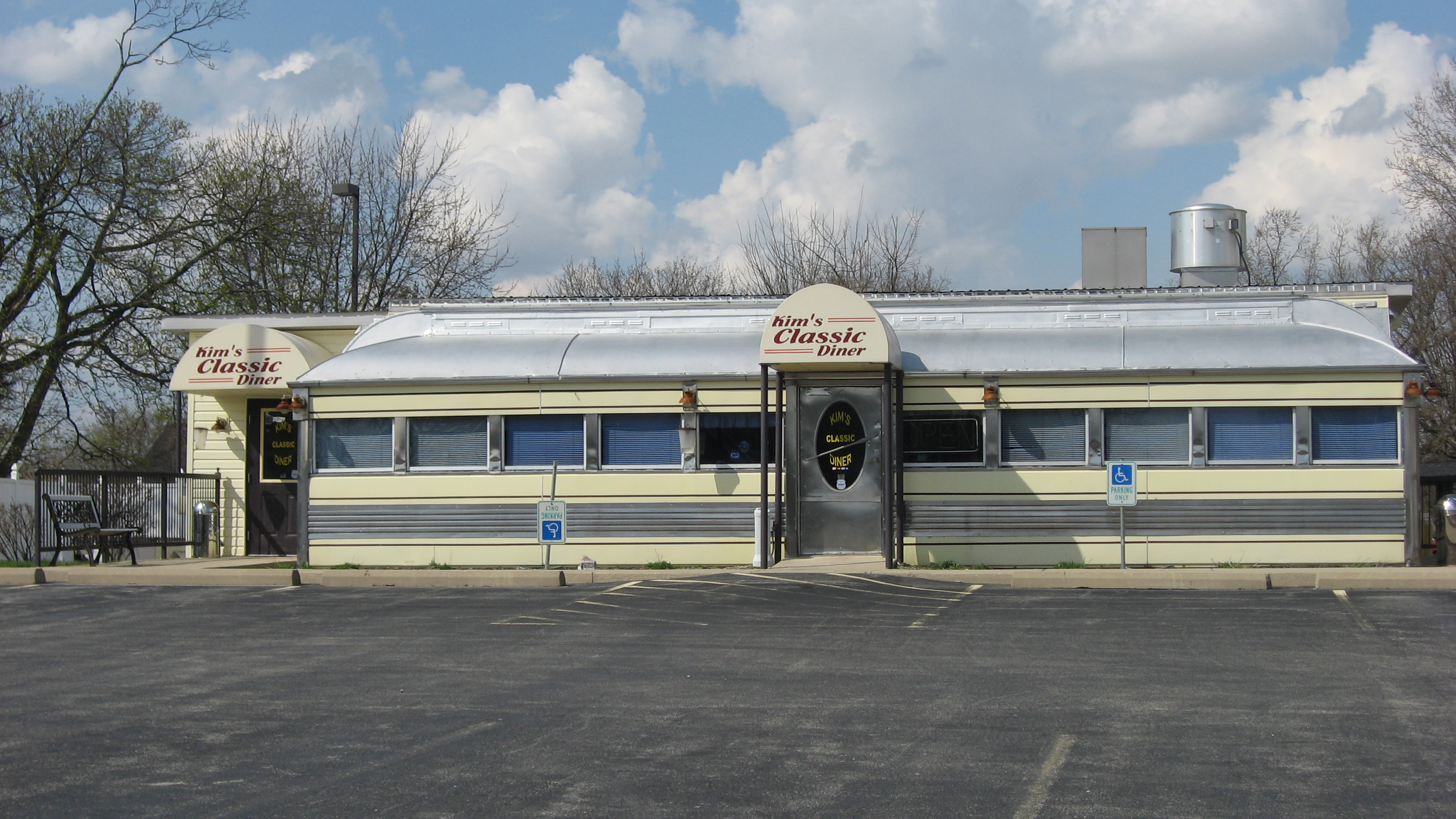
Kim's Classic Diner, a village landmark
