= SS Colorado =

Several merchant ships have been named SS Colorado:

- SS Colorado (1867), US propeller. Grounded off the Keweenaw Peninsula, in 1898.
- SS Colorado (1902), Canadian propeller. Originally named Tadenac. Scrapped in 1967.
- SS Colorado (1914), UK propeller, torpedoed near Kingston upon Hull in 1917.
