= SS Iowa =

Many commercial ships have been named the Iowa in honor of Iowa, the 29th United States state.

- SS Iowa (1902) Harland and Wolff. WW I troop ship Artemis, cargo ship Empire Bittern sunk as additional breakwater ship Normandy July 1944.
- SS Iowa (1920) was built as SS West Cadron, renamed in 1928, and sank January 12, 1936, killing 34 crew and passengers.

== See also ==
- USS Iowan
- USS Iowa
- Iowa (steamboat)
