= SS Toledo =

Several merchant ships have been named SS Toledo:

- SS Toledo (1854), US propeller. Grounded off Port Washington, Wisconsin, in 1856.
- SS Toledo (1862), US propeller, Official No. 24112. Grounded on the Keweenaw Peninsula in 1898.
- SS Toledo (1880), UK propeller, cargo ship, Official No. 85016. Scuttled in 1917.
- SS Toledo (1882), UK propeller, cargo ship. Ran aground off the Isles of Scilly in 1898.
