= Lee Creek Bridge =

Lee Creek Bridge may refer to:

- Lee Creek Bridge (Natural Dam, Arkansas), in the community of Natural Dam
- Lee Creek Bridge (Van Buren, Arkansas), listed on the NRHP in Crawford County
- Lee's Creek Covered Bridge, near Dover, Kentucky
