= Lee Creek, West Virginia =

Lee Creek
- Unincorporated community
- Location within the state of West Virginia Lee Creek (the United States)
- Coordinates: 39°9′11″N 81°44′22″W
- Country: United States
- State: West Virginia
- County: Wood
- Elevation: 594 ft (181 m)
- Time zone: UTC-5 (Eastern (EST))
  - Summer (DST): UTC-4 (EDT)
- GNIS ID: 1554935

Lee Creek is an unincorporated community in Wood County, West Virginia, United States.
