= Lees Creek (Ohio) =

Stream in Ohio, U.S.

Lees Creek is a stream in Highland, Fayette and Clinton counties, Ohio, in the United States.

Lees Creek was named for Peter Lee, a government surveyor.

== Location ==
- Mouth: Confluence with Rattlesnake Creek, Highland County 39°20′14″N 83°29′29″W
- Source: Clinton County east of Wilmington 39°26′44″N 83°38′53″W

== See also ==
- List of rivers of Ohio
