= Reesville, Ohio =

Unincorporated community in Ohio, U.S.

Coordinates: 39°28′56″N 83°40′37″W

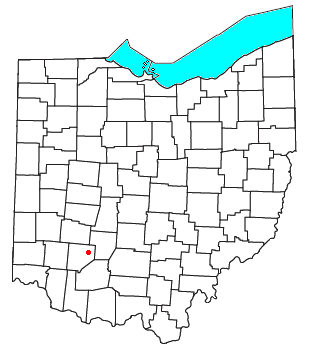
Location of Reesville, Ohio

Reesville is an unincorporated community in northwestern Richland Township, Clinton County, Ohio, United States. It has a post office with the ZIP code 45166. It is located along State Route 72.

== History ==
Reesville was platted in 1857 by Moses Reese, and named for him. A post office has been in operation at Reesville since 1858.

== Education ==
Reesville is located within the East Clinton Local school district

== Parks ==
There is a parking lot next to the Post Office for the Clinton-Fayette Friendship Trail . If you travel South on the trail you go to Melvin if you travel North you head to Sabina.

== Gallery ==
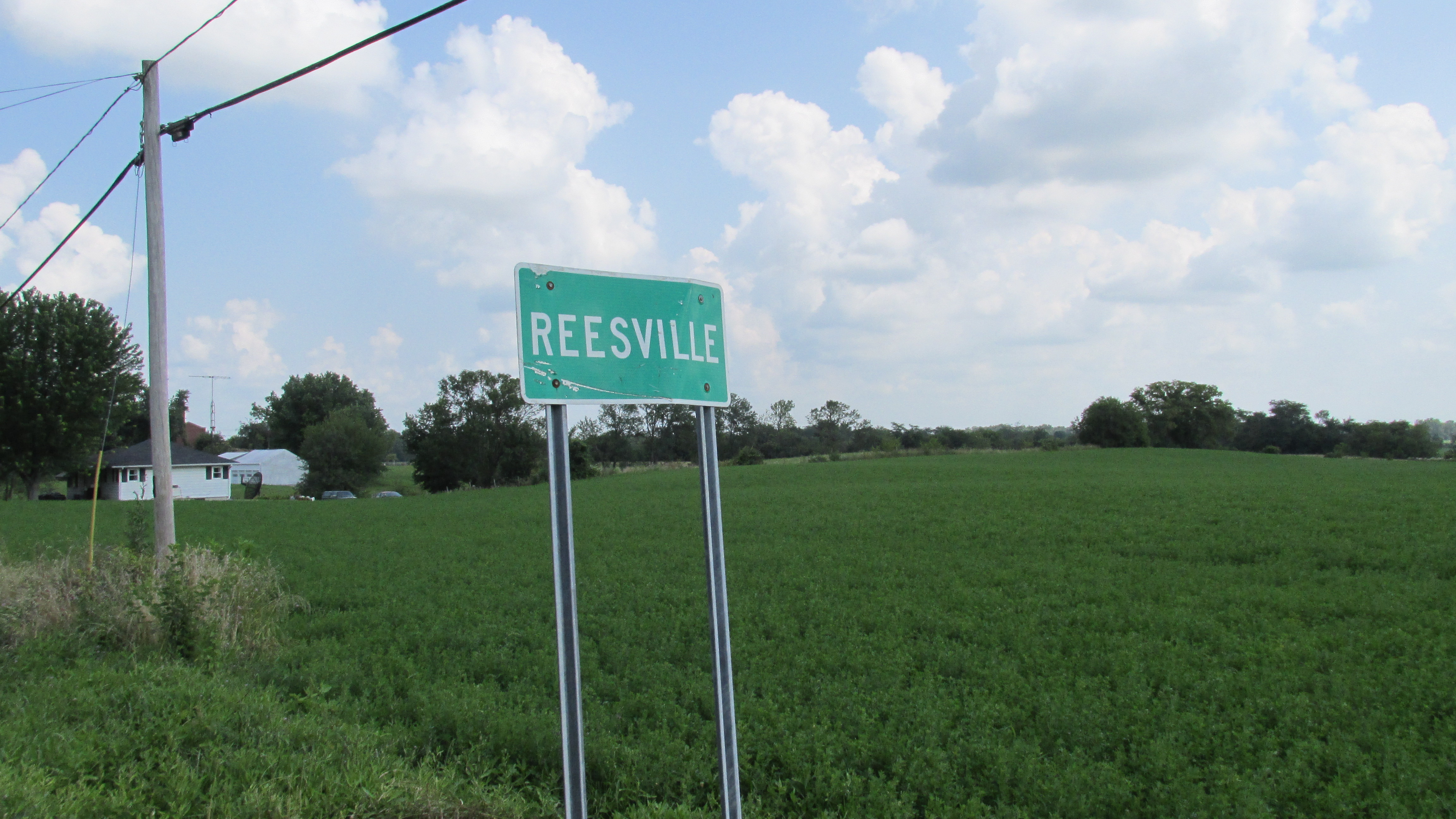
Reesville community sign

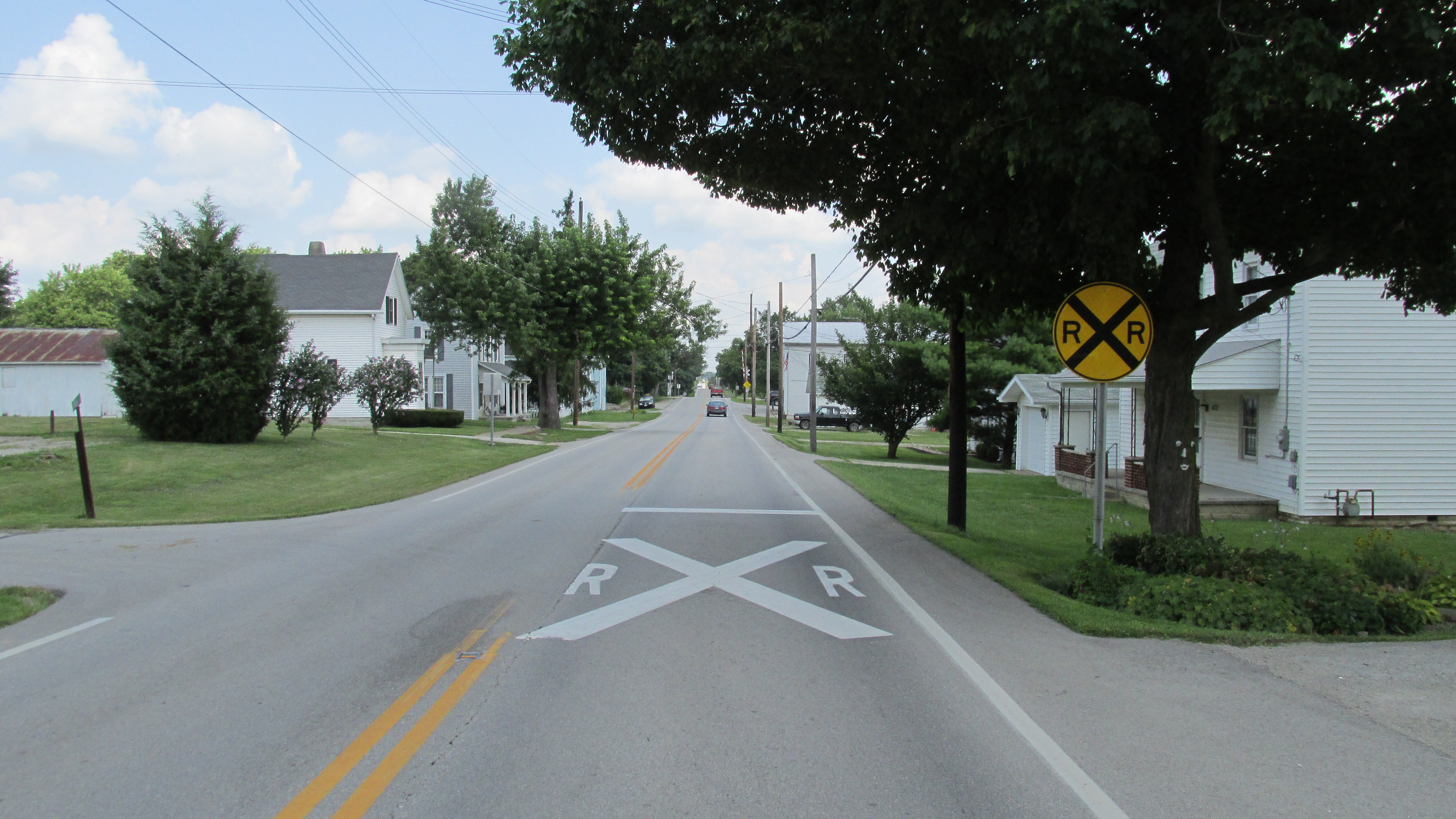
Looking north on Ohio State Route 72 in Reesville
