= Southwest Head (New Brunswick) =

Peninsula in New Brunswick, Canada

Coordinates: 44°35′55″N 66°54′20″W

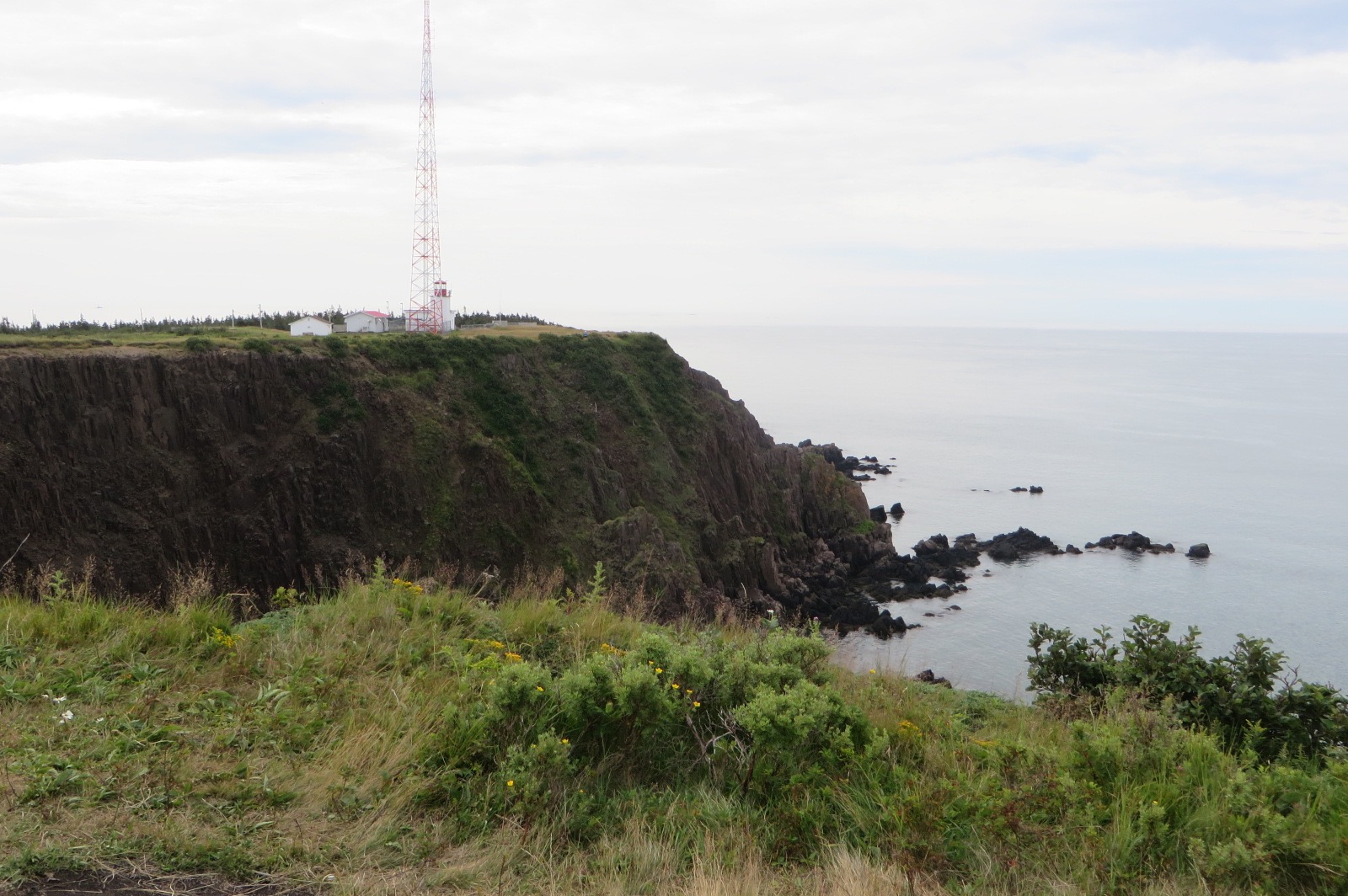
Southwest Head

Southwest Head is a headland located at the southwestern tip of Grand Manan Island in the Canadian province of New Brunswick.

Southwest Head forms the southern and westernmost point on Grand Manan Island as well as the northwestern limit of the Bay of Fundy and is opposite the southwestern limit at Brier Island, Nova Scotia.

The Southwest Head lighthouse was built following an 1878 report by the New Brunswick Department of Marine. It was first lit on 1 February 1880. The lighthouse was 200 feet above sea level at the edge of Gull Cliff and its revolving catoptric light was visible for a distance of 24 miles. The square wooden tower had an attached house for the light keeper and his family. In 1959 the lighthouse was replaced by a single story cinder block building with a square tower. The lighthouse was automated and ceased to have a resident keeper in 1987. The building next to the lighthouse tower was demolished in September 2017.

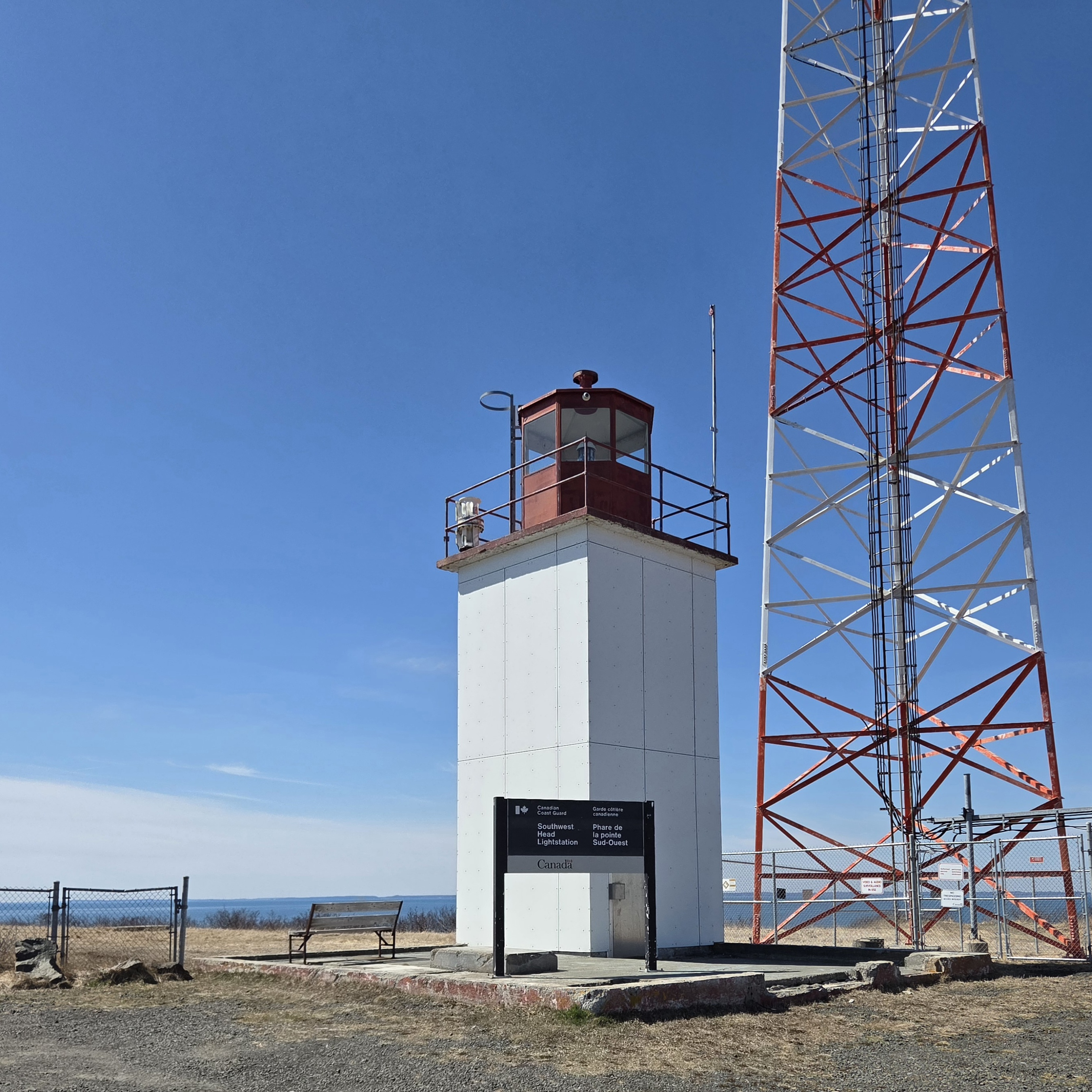
The Southwest Head Lightstation in 2026

In February 1963 two Grand Manan men rescued a fisherman whose boat had run aground at the foot of the Southwest Head cliffs. They both received Carnegie Medals for heroism.
