= Lee Creek (Ohio River tributary) =

Stream in West Virginia, U.S.

Coordinates: 39°08′59″N 81°44′26″W

Lee Creek is a stream in the U.S. state of West Virginia. It is a tributary of the Ohio River. The creek was named after David Lee, a pioneer settler.

== See also ==
- List of rivers of West Virginia
