= List of steam frigates of the United States Navy =

Ships of the United States Navy

Ships in current service
- Current ships

Ships grouped alphabetically
- A–B; C; D–F; G–H; I–K; L; M; N–O; P; Q–R; S; T–V; W–Z

Ships grouped by type
- Aircraft carriers; Airships; Amphibious warfare ships; Auxiliaries; Battlecruisers; Battleships; Cruisers; Destroyers; Destroyer escorts; Destroyer leaders; Escort carriers; Frigates; Hospital ships; Littoral combat ships; Mine warfare vessels; Monitors; Oilers; Patrol vessels; Registered civilian vessels; Sailing frigates; Steam frigates; Steam gunboats; Ships of the line; Sloops of war; Submarines; Torpedo boats; Torpedo retrievers; Unclassified miscellaneous; Yard and district craft

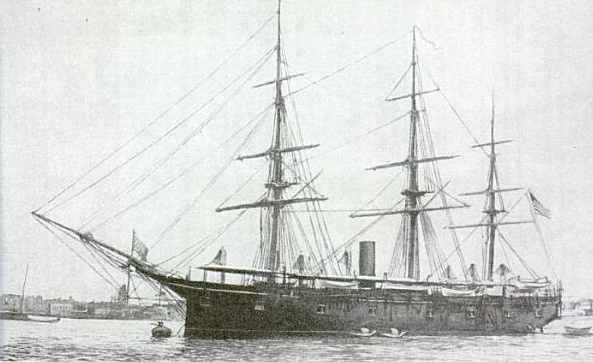
USS Trenton

This is a list of steam frigates used or previously used by the United States Navy.

Name	Type	Class	Authorized	Dates of Service	Fate
Mississippi	2nd class	Mississippi-class	3 March 1839	1841 – 1863	Sunk in action at Port Hudson, 64 killed
Missouri	2nd class	Mississippi-class	3 March 1839	1842 – 1843	Lost to fire
Susquehanna	2nd class	Susquehanna-class	3 March 1847	1850 – 1883	Sold
Powhatan	2nd class	Susquehanna-class	3 March 1847	1852 – 1887	Sold
Franklin	1st class	–	1 September 1851	1867 – 1916	Sold
Merrimack	1st class	Merrimack-class	6 April 1854	1856 – 1861	Sunk to avoid capture, rebuilt as CSS Virginia
Wabash	1st class	Merrimack-class	6 April 1854	1856 – 1912	Sold
Roanoke	1st class	Merrimack-class	6 April 1854	1857 – 1883	Sold
Colorado	1st class	Merrimack-class	6 April 1854	1858 – 1885	Sold
Minnesota	1st class	Merrimack-class	6 April 1854	1857 – 1901	Scrapped
Niagara	1st class	–	6 April 1854	1857 – 1885	Sold
Florida	2nd class	Wampanoag-class		1867 – 1885	Sold
Tennessee	2nd class	Wampanoag-class		– 1888	Sold
Iowa	2nd class	Wampanoag-class			
Nevada	2nd class	Wampanoag-class		None	Canceled
Pompanoosus	2nd class	Wampanoag-class			
Bon Homme Richard	2nd class	Wampanoag-class		None	Canceled
Chattanooga		Wampanoag-class			
Pennsylvania	2nd class	Java-class			Canceled
Delaware	2nd class	Java-class			
California	2nd class	Java-class			
Illinois	2nd class	Java-class			Canceled
Antietam	2nd class	Java-class			
New York	2nd class	Java-class			Canceled
Java	2nd class	Java-class			Canceled
Hassalo		Hassalo-class			
Watauga		Hassalo-class			
Trenton		–		1877 – 1891	Lost to the Apia cyclone, 1 killed
