= USS Ammonoosuc (1864) =

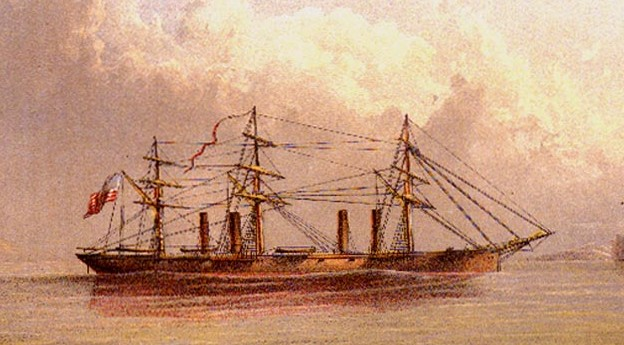
- Drawing of Ammonoosuc

History

United States
- Name: USS Ammonoosuc
- Namesake: Ammonoosuc River
- Builder: Boston Navy Yard, Boston, Massachusetts
- Laid down: during the first half of 1863
- Launched: 21 July 1864
- Completed: 1868
- Renamed: USS Iowa 15 May 1869
- Renamed: USS Ammonoosuc 13 October 1870
- Stricken: 26 June 1883
- Fate: Sold for scrap 27 September 1883; Burned and sank 21 August 1885
- Notes: Ran sea trials 1868

General characteristics
- Class & type: Wampanoag-class screw frigate
- Displacement: 3,850 tons
- Length: 335 ft (102 m)
- Beam: 44 ft 4 in (13.51 m)
- Draft: depth of hold 16 ft 6 in (5.03 m); draft 10 ft 6 in (3.20 m)
- Propulsion: Morgan Iron Works steam engines
- Speed: 17.11 knots
- Complement: 330
- Armament: 10 × 9-inch Dahlgren smoothbores; 3 × 60-pounder Parrott rifles; 2 × 24-pounder howitzers

The first USS Ammonoosuc (later briefly renamed USS Iowa) was a 3,850‑ton wooden screw steam frigate of the Wampanoag class. Laid down during the American Civil War in early 1863 by the Boston Navy Yard and launched on 21 July 1864, she was designed for exceptional speed to counter Confederate commerce raiders and for potential use against Great Britain if they sided with the Confederacy during the American Civil War. She achieved a sustained speed of 17.11 knots (31.69 km/h; 19.69 mph) during sea trials in June 1868, briefly making her the fastest warship afloat. Despite this impressive performance, Ammonoosuc was never commissioned for active service. Her name was changed to USS Iowa on 15 May 1869, but it reverted to Ammonoosuc on 13 October 1870. The ship remained out of commission until her sale for scrap on 27 September 1883.

== Naval buildup against English threat ==
From the outbreak of the American Civil War in 1861, the Lincoln Administration seemed to feel that the British Government's sympathies lay with the Confederacy. The Trent Affair further strained Anglo-American relations, and the terrible toll exacted from Union shipping by commerce raiding Confederate cruisers built in England forced the Union Navy to make contingency plans for what appeared to be an increasingly likely war with England.

With the Royal Navy considerably more powerful than its American counterpart, the United States Navy decided that—should open hostilities with Queen Victoria's empire break out—it would adopt its traditional strategy of preying on British merchant shipping. To prepare for such an eventuality, the Federal Navy Department embarked upon a program of developing very fast seagoing steamships capable of overtaking all ships they might pursue and of escaping from any they might wish to elude.

== Ammonoosuc’s novel design ==
Ammonoosuc was one of these steamers. Her hull was designed by Benjamin Franklin Delano to hold a pair of extremely powerful engines to be built at New York City by the Morgan Iron Works according to plans drawn by Benjamin Franklin Isherwood for the screw frigate Wampanoag. These engines were not ready when Ammonoosuc was launched and the collapse of the Confederacy prompted a significant slowdown on the work as that all but eliminated the Navy's need for fast, new warships. The engines were finally finished late in 1867, and Ammonoosuc's hull was towed to New York City so that they might be installed.

== Initial Sea Trials ==
In June 1868, under Commander William D. Whiting, Ammonoosuc steamed from New York City to Boston, Massachusetts. Despite navigating in dense fog, she achieved a sustained speed of 17.11 knots (31.69 km/h; 19.69 mph) between Cape Cod and Fort Warren, Massachusetts, over a three-hour period during her sea trials, briefly making her the fastest warship afloat. This impressive performance validated Benjamin F. Isherwood’s innovative high-speed naval engineering concept, though concerns remained about the ship's structural integrity and seaworthiness at such speeds.

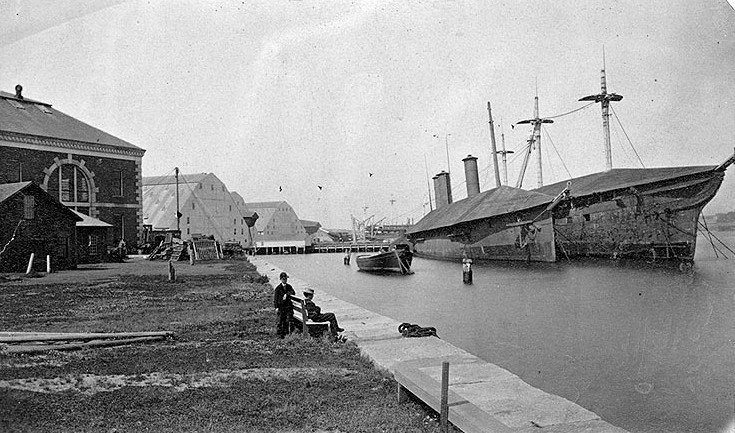
USS Ammonoosuc (inboard ship) c1870

A significant portion of Ammonoosuc′s hull was dedicated to her powerful engines and related machinery, leaving insufficient space for other essential operations. Consequently, the ship was never commissioned for active service and was instead laid up in ordinary at the Boston Navy Yard in Boston, Massachusetts. While in ordinary, Ammonoosuc was briefly renamed USS Iowa on 15 May 1869, but her name reverted to Ammonoosuc on 13 October 1870.

== Final disposition ==
Ammonoosuc was sold at Boston on 27 September 1883 to the firm of Hubel and Porter, of Syracuse, New York. While she was awaiting stripping and subsequent scrapping off Plum Beach near Port Washington, Long Island, New York, along with several other decommissioned U.S. Navy ships — the steam frigates USS Colorado and USS Susquehanna, screw sloop USS Congress, and unidentified ships described by the press as "Minnesota" and "South Carolina" — and the ships Fairplay and Lotta Grant, a fire broke out aboard Colorado and spread to all the ships on the evening of 21 August 1885. Ammonoosuc and the other ships all burned to the waterline and sank. The company that had been breaking the ships up, Stannard & Co., claimed at the time that the fire may have caused a loss of more than US$100,000.

== See also ==
- List of steam frigates of the United States Navy
