= CSS Squib =

American torpedo boat

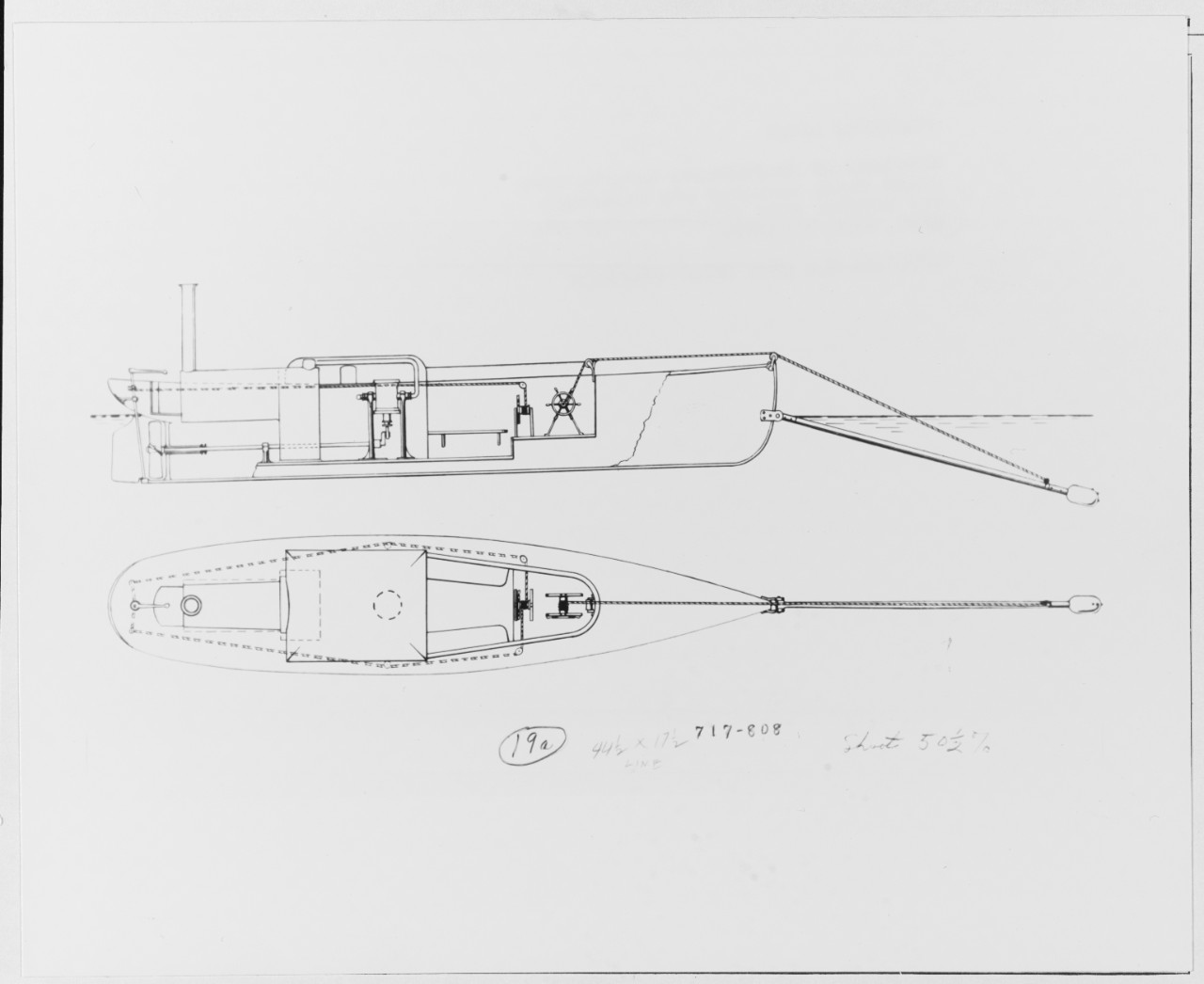
- Design plans for Squib

History

Confederate States
- Name: Squib
- Operator: Confederate States Navy
- Laid down: 1863
- Launched: Early 1864
- Fate: Scuttled, February 1865

General characteristics
- Class & type: Squib-class torpedo boat
- Length: 30 ft (9.1 m) or 46 ft (14 m)
- Beam: 6 ft 3 in (1.91 m)
- Draft: c.3 ft (0.91 m)
- Depth of hold: 3 ft 9 in (1.14 m)
- Installed power: Condensing marine steam engine
- Propulsion: Screw propeller
- Complement: 6
- Armament: Spar torpedo
- Armor: Boiler iron

CSS Squib, also known as CSS Infanta, was a Squib-class torpedo boat that served in the Confederate States Navy during the American Civil War. Squib was laid down in 1863, and was launched in early 1864. Her design was a form of launch armed with a spar torpedo. Initially serving on the James River as a flag of truce boat, she snuck into the Union Navy anchorage at Hampton Roads and attacked the steam frigate USS Minnesota early on the morning of April 9, 1864. Minnesota was damaged but not sunk, and Squib was able to escape back upriver. At an unknown time in mid-1864, Squib was moved by rail to the Wilmington, North Carolina, area, where she served on the Cape Fear River. Records of her service at Wilmington after November 1864 are not extant, but she may have resupplied a Confederate fortification during the Second Battle of Fort Fisher in January 1865. The next month, the Confederates withdrew from Wilmington, and Squib was scuttled off Cape Fear.

== Construction and characteristics ==
During the American Civil War, Confederate attempts to counter the Union blockade included torpedo boats. The first Confederate torpedo attack occurred in October 1863, when CSS David damaged the ironclad USS New Ironsides. Following this attack, the Confederates built more torpedo boats, using varying designs. One of these designs was the Squib class, a group of steam-powered launches armed with a spar torpedo in the bow. Squib was the lead ship of the class. She was also known as Infanta.

The naval historian R. Thomas Campbell states that the designer of Squib may have been constructor William A. Graves, while the historians Peter Pry and Richard Zeitlin attribute the design to Lieutenant Hunter Davidson. The Dictionary of American Naval Fighting Ships (DANFS) provides dimensions for Squib as a length of 46 feet (14 m), a beam of 6 feet 3 inches (1.91 m), and a depth of hold of 3 feet 9 inches (1.14 m). Pry and Zeitlin provide length and beam measurements agreeing with those provided by the DANFS. Campbell instead provides a length figure for Squib of probably 30 feet (9.1 m) or 35 feet (11 m), with a beam of 6 feet (72 in), and draft of roughly 3 feet (0.91 m).

Propulsion was provided by a single screw propeller, which was powered by a two-cylinder condensing marine steam engine and a single boiler. Her top speed is not known, but the vessel was reputed to be fast in contemporary reports. Squib's forward hatch and machinery were protected by armor made from boiler iron. The vessel's spar torpedo shaft was 18 feet (220 in) long, and could be raised and lowered by a chain and tackle system. Her crew numbered 6.

== Service history ==
Squib was first laid down at an unknown point in 1863. She was then launched in early 1864. Her commander was Davidson. Serving on the James River, Squib saw early use delivering flags of truce. Davidson decided to use Squib to test torpedo designs at Rocketts Landing in Richmond, Virginia. Creating an empty torpedo with a copper cylinder and a chemical fuse, Davidson attached it to the spar, steered the vessel towards a derelict wharf, and then rammed the torpedo into the wharf. This failed to detonate, and Davidson redid the experiment after adding 25 pounds (11 kg) of gunpowder to the torpedo. This time, the torpedo exploded and destroyed the wharf.

Davidson then decided to attack a Union blockader with Squib. Assembling a crew for this mission of six in addition to himself, Davidson decided to use anthracite coal as fuel, to avoid creating sparks or smoke that would reveal the vessel's position prematurely. While anthracite coal was not readily available in the area, prewar shipping activities had led to coal spills into the river, and enough coal could be recovered from the riverbed to fuel Squib. The movement towards the Union fleet began in early April 1864. To preserve coal, the steamer CSS Torpedo towed Squib to a point 15 miles (24 km) past City Point, Virginia. Proceeding alone, Squib then reached the Newport News, Virginia, area on April 8.

After midnight on the night of April 8/9, Squib moved into Hampton Roads and moved towards the steam frigate USS Minnesota. While the vessel was sighted by some Union vessels, she was never challenged and stopped, possibly because she was recognized as a flag of truce vessel. At about 2:00 am, Squib was in position near Minnesota and began accelerating towards the vessel. When the commander of Minnesota challenged the approaching vessel, Davidson claimed that his vessel was USS Roanoke. The tugboat USS Poppy attempted to intercept Squib, but lacked the steam pressure to move. Men on Minnesota fired at Squib with small arms to no effect shortly before impact. The spar torpedo was set to strike 6 feet (72 in) below Minnesota's waterline and the torpedo used in the attack contained 53 pounds (24 kg) of powder. When the spar torpedo struck the Union vessel, it exploded, damaging Minnesota. The torpedo was set too high, lessening the amount of damage to the Union ship. While Minnesota had been damaged, her hull remained intact.

The force of the explosion started to pull Squib underwater, but the Confederate vessel was able to escape. While pulling away from Minnesota, Squib came under further small arms fire and was targeted by a cannon shot. Poppy was still immobile and could not pursue, and an extensive Union search failed to catch Squib. Bluffing a move towards the Nansemond River, but then entering the James instead, Squib hid during the day and was towed upriver by Torpedo at night. As a result of the attack, Union Rear Admiral S. P. Lee forbade Squib to ever be used for flags of truce again, and Davidson was promoted to the rank of commander. In mid-1864, Squib was transferred to Wilmington, North Carolina, by rail, where she guarded the Cape Fear River. The last extant official report mentioning the activities of Squib was dated November 5, 1864, but Campbell believes she was used to resupply a Confederate fortification during the Second Battle of Fort Fisher in January 1865. The Confederates withdrew from Wilmington in February 1865, and Squib, along with the steamer CSS General Whiting, were scuttled off Cape Fear.

== Sources ==
- Browning, Robert M. (1993). From Cape Charles to Cape Fear: The North Atlantic Blockading Squadron During the Civil War. Tuscaloosa, Alabama: University of Alabama Press. ISBN 0-8173-5019-5.
- Campbell, R. Thomas (2000). Hunters of the Night: Confederate Torpedo Boats in the War Between the States. Shippensburg, Pennsylvania: Burd Street Press. ISBN 1-57249-202-3.
- Coski, John M. (2005) [2006]. Capital Navy: The Men, Ships, and Operations of the James River Squadron. New York: Savas Beatie. ISBN 978-1-932714-15-9.
- Holcombe, Robert (1997). "Types of Ships". In Still, William N. Jr. (ed.). The Confederate Navy: The Ships, Men and Organization, 1861–1865. London: Conway Maritime Press. pp. 40–68. ISBN 0-85177-686-8.
- Pry, Peter; Zeitlin, Richard (1984). "Torpedo Boats: Secret Weapons of the South". Warship International. 21 (4): 384–393. ISSN 0043-0374.
- Silverstone, Paul H. (1989). Warships of the Civil War Navies. Annapolis, Maryland: Naval Institute Press. ISBN 978-0-87021-783-8.
