= USS Susquehanna (1850) =

Sidewheel steam frigate

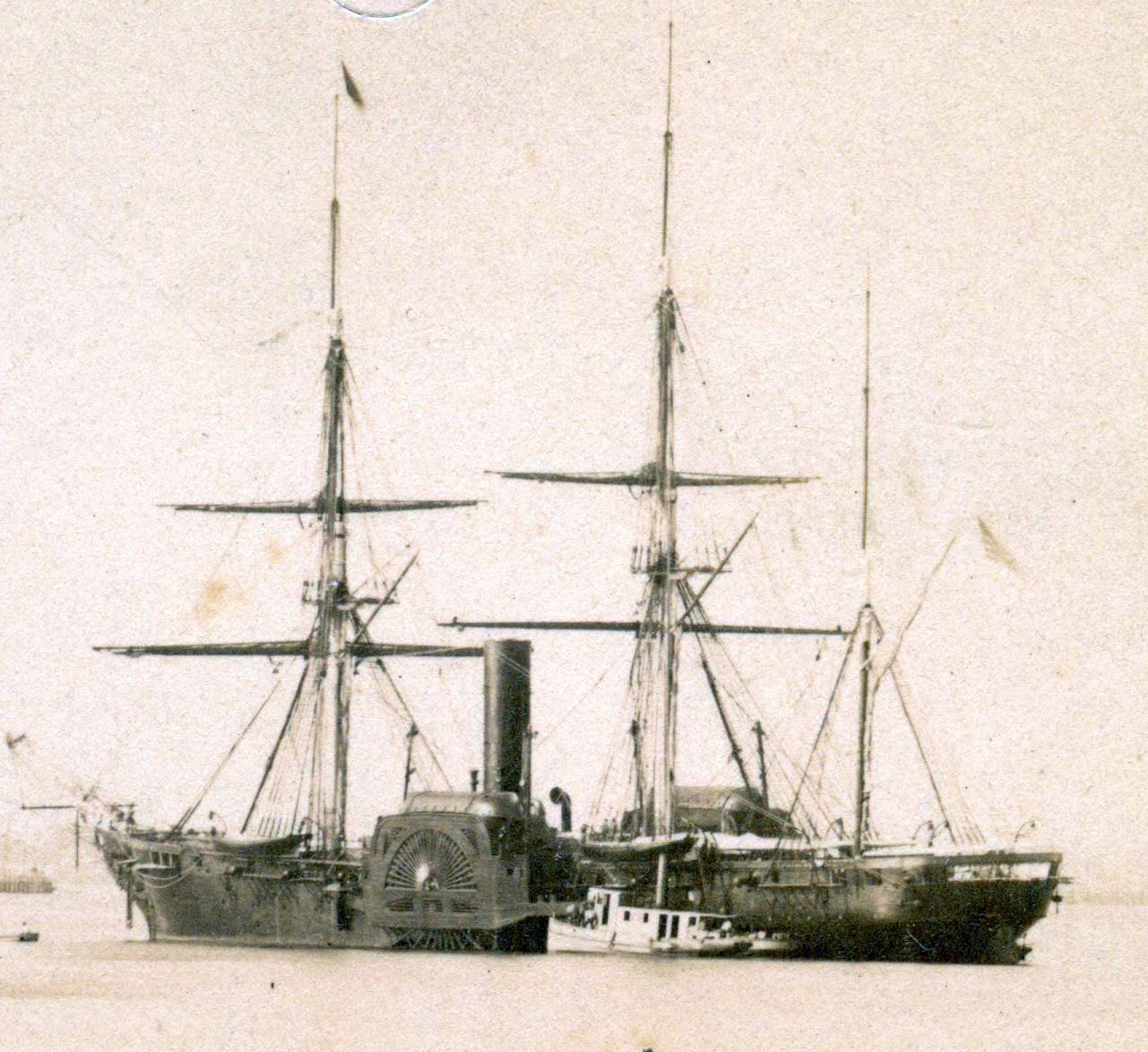
- Susquehanna

History

United States
- Name: USS Susquehanna
- Namesake: Susquehanna River
- Builder: New York Navy Yard
- Laid down: 1847
- Launched: 5 April 1850
- Commissioned: 24 December 1850
- Decommissioned: 14 January 1868
- Fate: Sold for scrap 27 September 1883; Burned and sank 21 August 1885

General characteristics
- Type: Steam Frigate
- Tonnage: 2,450 long tons (2,489 t)
- Length: 257 ft (78 m)
- Beam: 45 ft (14 m)
- Draft: 20 ft 6 in (6.25 m)
- Depth of hold: 26 ft (7.9 m)
- Propulsion: Steam engine,
- Speed: 10 knots (19 km/h; 12 mph)
- Armament: 2 × 150-pounder Parrott rifles; 12 × 9 in (230 mm) Dahlgren smoothbore guns; 1 × one 12-pounder rifle

USS Susquehanna, a sidewheel steam frigate, was the first ship of the United States Navy to be named for the Susquehanna River, which rises in Lake Otsego in central New York and flows across Pennsylvania and the northeast corner of Maryland emptying into the Chesapeake Bay.

== Construction and commissioning ==
Susquehanna′s keel was laid down by the New York Navy Yard in 1847. She was launched on 5 April 1850 and was commissioned on 24 December 1850, Captain John H. Aulick in command.

== Service history ==
=== East India Squadron, 1850–1855 ===
After completing her trials, which she began in January 1851, the side-wheel frigate sailed on 8 June for the Far East to become flagship of the East India Squadron under the command of Commodore John H. Aulick. Aulick's orders included instructions to visit Japan and negotiate a treaty opening diplomatic relations with that country. However, before he could carry out his mission, he was forced to give up his command as result of quarrels during the first leg of his journey with Captain Franklin Buchanan, the captain of the flagship and due to an incident with a Brazilian diplomat on board. Susquehanna joined Commodore Matthew Perry's expedition as his flagship at Canton and entered Edo Bay with his squadron on 8 July 1853. After Perry had presented his demands and official letter from President Millard Fillmore to the Japanese government on 14 July, the American warships departed on 17 July. On 12 February 1854, Susquehanna returned with the squadron to Japan as part of Perry's show of force, resulting in the signing of the Convention of Kanagawa on 31 March 1854. The frigate departed Japanese waters on 24 March; and, after operating on the China coast, headed home via the Indian Ocean and the Cape of Good Hope. She arrived at Philadelphia, Pennsylvania, on 10 March 1855 and was decommissioned on 15 March.

=== Mediterranean Squadron, 1856–1861 ===
Recommissioned on 5 May 1856, the ship joined the Mediterranean Squadron in July under the command of Joshua R. Sands. After serving as flagship, she returned and was laid up on 18 April 1858. Reactivated at the New York Navy Yard on 17 August 1860, the ship sailed for Veracruz, a week later and thence sailed to the Mediterranean. On the outbreak of the American Civil War, she departed La Spezia, Italy, on 5 May 1861 and reached Boston, Massachusetts, on 6 June.

=== American Civil War, 1861–1865 ===
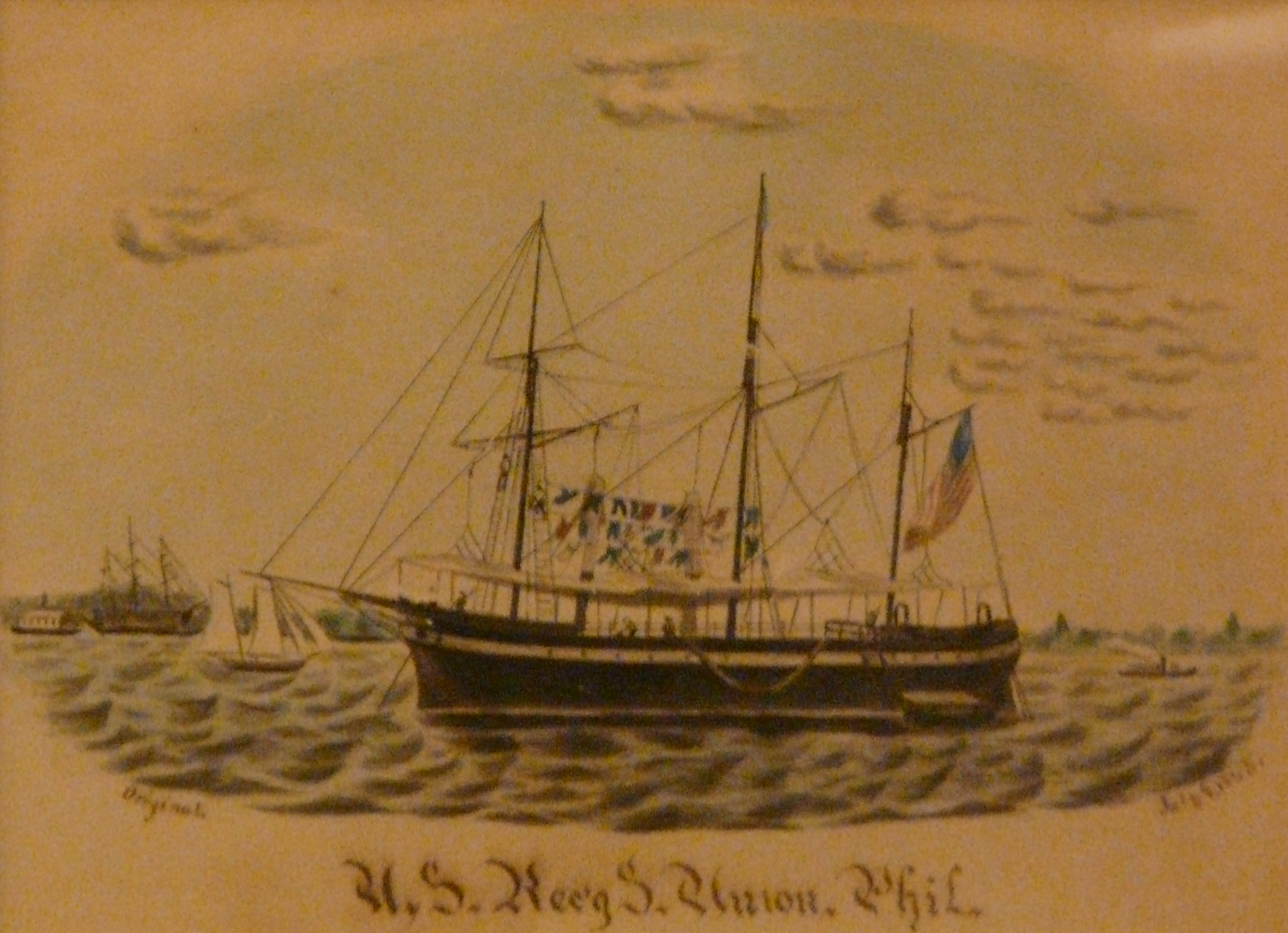
US Steam Frigate Susquehanna

The ship was assigned to the Atlantic Blockading Squadron and sailed for Hampton Roads. Late in August, Susquehanna participated in the joint Army-Navy expedition to Hatteras Inlet, North Carolina, which captured Fort Clark and Fort Hatteras on 29 August. During September, she captured two British schooners: Argonaut on 13 September and Prince Alfred on 28 September. In the same month, she also took two Confederate schooners as well: San Juan on 28 September and Baltimore the following day. All four ships were laden with contraband.

Late in October, Susquehanna joined Flag Officer Samuel Francis DuPont's expedition to South Carolina waters which captured Port Royal Sound on 7 November; took possession of Beaufort, South Carolina, on 9 November; and established a blockade at the mouth of the Broad River the same day. These operations provided the Union Navy with an important base for the future operations of the South Atlantic Blockading Squadron. Susquehanna served in this important squadron until the following spring, operating primarily on blockade duty off Charleston, South Carolina. There, she took British schooner Coquette on 3 April 1862, attempting to slip into Charleston from the Bahamas.

On 27 April, Susquehanna was ordered to Hampton Roads to strengthen the North Atlantic Blockading Squadron which was then making every effort to support Major General George B. McClellan's drive up the peninsula toward Richmond, Virginia. The Union forces in the area were then threatened by ironclad CSS Virginia, the former USS Merrimack. Susquehanna and four other Union warships acting under orders from President of the United States Abraham Lincoln bombarded Confederate batteries at Sewell's Point, Virginia, on 8 May. Three days later, Virginia was blown up by her crew, ending her threat to Union shipping in the Hampton Roads area and freed Susquehanna for duty elsewhere.

Late in May, the ship was assigned to the West Gulf Blockading Squadron, and she carried dispatches for Flag Officer David Farragut to the Gulf of Mexico. En route, she captured Confederate schooner Princeton on 11 June, and sent the prize to Key West, Florida. On 29 June, she and Kanawha seized British steamer Ann trying to get into Mobile Bay with a cargo of arms and ammunition. Susquehanna continued to operate in the Gulf of Mexico until ordered to New York for repairs in the spring of 1863. While proceeding north, the warship captured schooner Alabama off the Florida coast on 18 April. She was decommissioned at the New York Navy Yard on 14 May 1863.

Recommissioned on 20 July 1864, Susquehanna was assigned to the North Atlantic Blockading Squadron and participated in the abortive attacks on Fort Fisher, North Carolina, on Christmas Eve 1864. However, in mid-February 1865, the double-ender was in the mighty force which finally took that Confederate stronghold and closed Wilmington, North Carolina, the Confederate States of America's last major port. At that time, she was under command of Rear Admiral Sylvanus William Godon. One of her crewmen, Landsman Henry S. Webster, was awarded the Medal of Honor for his actions in the Second Battle of Fort Fisher.

=== Atlantic Squadron, 1866–1868 ===
Following the end of the American Civil War, Susquehanna brought American delegates to Veracruz bay in Mexico during the destruction of the Second Mexican Empire in order to open up relations with the United States backed Mexican president Benito Juárez. When the Susquehanna found out that the acting imperial ruler Maximilian I of Mexico had decided not to abdicate, the ship turned around to head home 1866. The USS Susquehanna also sailed for Brazil and operated on the Atlantic coast of South America until returning home and decommissioning on 30 June 1866. Recommissioned on 2 November 1866, the ship ended her active service as flagship of the North Atlantic Squadron.

== Decommissioning and disposal ==
Decommissioned at the New York Navy Yard on 14 January 1868, Susquehanna was laid up until she was sold for scrapping on 27 September 1883 to E. Stannard of New York City.

While Susquehanna was awaiting stripping and subsequent scrapping off Plum Beach near Port Washington, Long Island, New York, along with several other decommissioned U.S. Navy ships — the steam frigates USS Ammonoosuc and USS Colorado, screw sloop USS Congress, and unidentified ships described by the press as "Minnesota" and "South Carolina" — and the ships Fairplay and Lotta Grant, a fire broke out aboard Colorado and spread to all the ships on the evening of 21 August 1885. Susquehanna and the other ships all burned to the waterline and sank. The company that had been breaking the ships up, Stannard & Co., claimed at the time that the fire may have caused a loss of more than US$100,000.

== In fiction ==
The ship appeared in Jules Verne's book Around the Moon, a sequel to From the Earth to the Moon, in which the ship rescues the main protagonists from their spacecraft, a projectile made of aluminium and launched by cannon, which splashed down off the coast of the California Peninsula.

== See also ==
- Union Navy
- List of steam frigates of the United States Navy
- Bibliography of early American naval history
