= Edward D. Robie =

American naval engineer

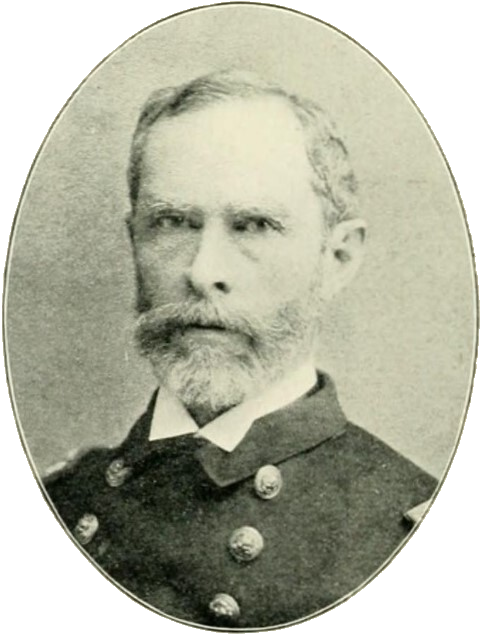
- Born: Edward Dunham Robie; September 11, 1831; Burlington, Vermont
- Died: June 7, 1911 (aged 79); Washington, D.C.
- Burial place: Arlington National Cemetery
- Spouse: Helena Adams (m. 1858)
- Military career
- Allegiance: United States of America
- Branch: U.S. Navy
- Service years: 1852–1893, 1898
- Rank: Rear Admiral
- Units: USS Mississippi; USS Susquehanna; USS Niagara; USS Lancaster; USS Mohican; USS Dictator; USS Pensacola; Boston Navy Shipyard; USS Wabash; USS Pensacola; Norfolk Naval Shipyard
- Conflicts: American Civil War; Spanish–American War

Edward Dunham Robie (September 11, 1831 – June 7, 1911) was a naval engineer, inventor, and Union naval officer during the American Civil War.

== Early life and career ==
Robie was born in Burlington, Vermont, the son of Jacob and Louisa (Dunham) Robie. He was educated at the local academy in Binghamton, New York, where he was awarded a scholarship prize and a warrant as an assistant engineer in the United States Navy in 1852.

He was Third Assistant Engineer on the frigate USS Mississippi, flagship of Commodore Matthew Perry's historic expedition to Japan from 1852 to 1855, which opened up that nation to the world for the first time.

In 1857, now Second Assistant Engineer, he was ordered to the frigate USS Susquehanna, which was involved in the first, albeit unsuccessful, attempt to lay a transatlantic telegraph cable across the Atlantic Ocean, from Newfoundland to Ireland. He was promoted to First Assistant Engineer in 1858, and was ordered to the USS Niagara, which made a round-trip voyage late that year to Monrovia, Liberia, transporting slaves liberated in August when a slave ship was captured off Cuba by another U.S. warship. Just prior to Robie's arrival on the ship, the Niagara had participated in the second attempt, this time successful, to lay the Transatlantic telegraph cable.

He married Helena Adams in 1858.

His next assignment was as First Assistant Engineer aboard the steam sloop USS Lancaster. Lancaster, flagship of the Pacific Squadron, was cruising in the Marquesas Islands (French Polynesia) when the Civil War started, and did not find out about the outbreak of hostilities until it arrived in Hawaii, two months later.

== Civil War ==
President Abraham Lincoln signed Edward Robie's commission as chief engineer in September 1861, and Robie went to sea again, this time on the steam sloop USS Mohican. The Mohican was involved in the capture of forts at Port Royal, South Carolina, and Fernandina, Florida, and on blockading duty off Charleston, South Carolina. He subsequently served as Senior Engineer of the North Atlantic Squadron, superintended the construction of the ironclad ram USS Dictator in 1862–1863, served on the steam ship Ericsson in 1864, and USS Dictator in 1864 and 1865. That year, he also served on the Engineer Board of Examiners.

== Postwar career ==
In 1866, Robie sailed to the Pacific aboard USS Ossipee, via the Strait of Magellan. On arriving in Panama, he was promoted to fleet engineer on board the flagship USS Pensacola.

In 1869, he served on a commission headed by Rear Admiral Louis M. Goldsborough that condemned the design of USS Wampanoag, contained numerous design features unprecedented in American naval construction.

Robie was stationed at the Boston Navy Yard in 1870 and 1871, then ordered to USS Wabash, which sailed the Mediterranean Sea. He improved a steam steering engine for that frigate, which was the first successful steam steerer used in the Navy. Robie later served for a time as Fleet Engineer on the North Atlantic and Gulf Squadrons, and from 1874 to 1877, was Chief Engineer of the Norfolk Navy Yard.

Later duties included special inspection duty at Pitsburg, Ohio, and the Cold Spring Foundry in New York, Fleet Engineer in the Pacific on the flagship USS Pensacola, Chief Engineer at Boston, then New York and finally Norfolk Navy yards.

His last tour of duty was with the Navy Department in Washington, D.C., where he remained until forced to retire due to his age, on September 11, 1893. He had served nearly 17 years at sea and more than 21½ years ashore.

During the Spanish–American War, Robie was recalled to help evaluate candidate vessels for the Auxiliary Naval Force at the ports of Charleston, South Carolina, Savannah, Georgia, Baltimore, Maryland and New York City. He also supervised the fitting out of ships at the Boston Navy Yard.

Robie retired with the rank of commodore, but an act of Congress in 1906 promoted him to rear admiral in appreciation for his services during the Civil War.

Rear Admiral Robie died at his home in Washington on June 7, 1911. He was buried at Arlington National Cemetery on June 9. His gravestone bears the title "Chief Engineer, U. S. Navy" rather than his final military rank.
