= USS Guerriere (1865) =

Sloop-of-war of the United States Navy

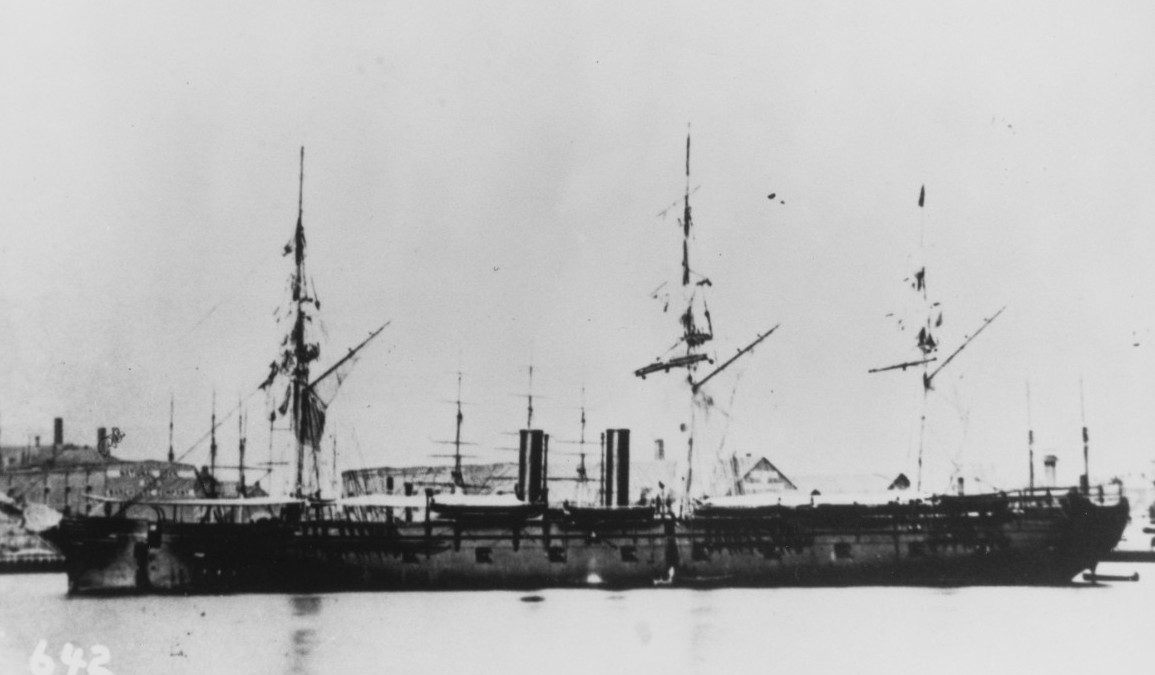
- Guerriere at an unknown location and date

History

United States
- Name: Guerriere
- Ordered: 1863
- Builder: Boston Navy Yard
- Laid down: 1864
- Launched: 9 September 1865
- Commissioned: 21 May 1867
- Decommissioned: 22 March 1872
- Fate: Sold, 12 December 1872

General characteristics
- Type: Java-class frigate
- Length: 319 ft 3 in (97.31 m)
- Beam: 46 ft (14 m)
- Draft: 17 ft 11 in (5.46 m)
- Propulsion: Sail
- Speed: 13 knots (24 km/h; 15 mph)
- Complement: 181 officers and enlisted
- Armament: 2 × 100-pounder guns; 1 × 60-pounder gun; 4 × 20-pounder guns; 6 × 9 in (230 mm) guns

USS Guerriere was a Java-class sloop of the United States Navy. She was laid down during the American Civil War to deter British intervention in 1864, although timber shortages and a rushed construction delayed progress. She was commissioned in 1867 and served in the South Atlantic Squadron for the next two years. Between 1870 and 1872, the sloop operated with the Mediterranean Squadron. Following her return to the United States, she was decommissioned and sold later that year.

== Development ==
During the American Civil War, the Confederate States used British-built privateers to hamper Union trade instead of directly challenging the Union Navy. One such privateer, CSS Alabama, was responsible for destroying 65 merchant vessels. The disruption of Union trade routes drove up domestic prices, damaged the economy, and forced the reassignment of ships from blockade duties against the South. The United States feared that the United Kingdom would directly intervene to support the Confederacy—a scenario that would have left the Union Navy outmatched by the Royal Navy. In response, the Union Navy began planning for a possible war. While the American fleet could not match the British in conventional battles, the plan called for employing tactics similar to those used by the Confederacy: commerce raiding. By using cruisers to launch hit-and-run attacks on British ports and merchant shipping, the Union hoped to make a war too costly for Britain to justify, ultimately forcing it back into neutrality.

For the new role, the Navy developed "commerce destroyers" that had the range and speed to intercept enemy ships at sea. Twenty-seven such ships were ordered by Congress in 1863, split into three classes varying in size, speed, and armament. The most well armed of these designs became known as the Java-class sloop. By 1864, the new ships were built according to a new doctrine of the Navy for the post-war era. Congress was only interested in a navy that could directly protect the United States, not one that could rival the Royal or French Navies. Instead of large, costly, ocean-going ironclads such as USS Dunderburg, the legislators wanted the Navy to only consist of coastal ironclads that would protect the shoreline and commerce destroyers to operate out at sea and deter aggression from foreign nations.

== Design ==
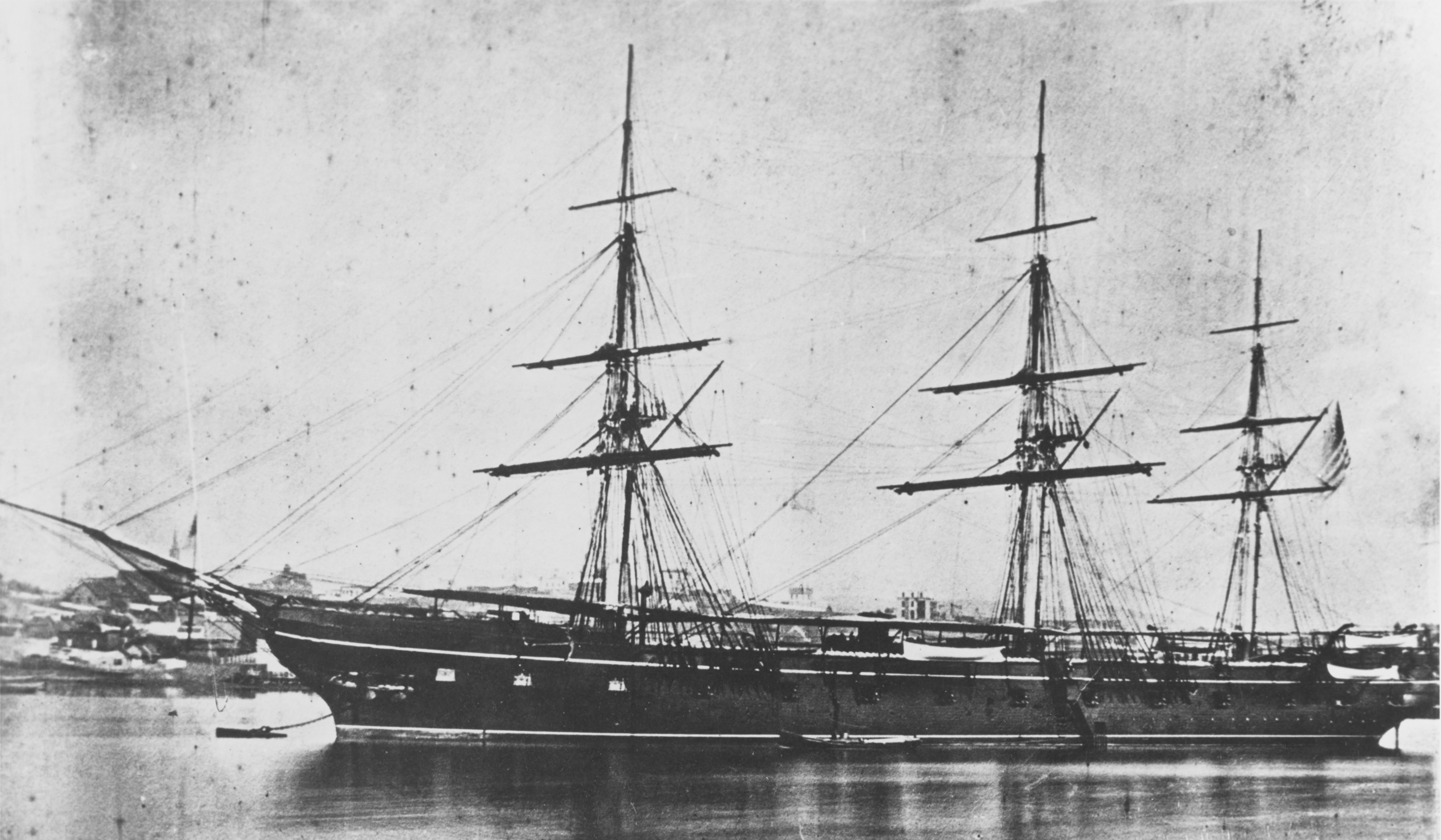
USS California, one of Guerriere's sister ships

The Java or Guerriere-class were envisioned as large screw-sloops with spar decks. The design featured an overall length of 336 feet 6 inches (102.57 m), length between perpendiculars of 312 feet 6 inches (95.25 m), beam of 46 feet (14 m), draft of 21 feet 5 inches (6.53 m), displacement of 3,954 short tons (3,530 long tons), and a complement of 325. Piscataqua was equipped with four main boilers and two superheating boilers, which provided steam to two horizontal back action steam 36 in (91 cm) stroke engines that turned one propeller powered by 540 short tons (480 long tons) of coal. The ships had two funnels and wooden hulls reinforced by iron braces. Ships of the class were fully rigged and carried 23,820 square feet (2,213 m^{2}) of sail, excluding top sails, on three masts. Under steam and sail, Piscataqua reached speeds up to 13 knots (24 km/h; 15 mph). Armament consisted of either sixteen or eighteen 9 in (23 cm) Dahlgren guns and two 100 lb (45 kg) Parrott rifles on the gun deck to form the broadside while a 60 lb (27 kg) rifle was mounted on the spar deck.

== Service history ==
In 1864, her keel was laid down at the Portsmouth Navy Yard, and she was launched on 9 September 1865 at the Boston Navy Yard. Like many other shipbuilding projects during the war, construction was rushed to get ships into service as soon as possible. A shortage of seasoned timber led to the class built out of heterogeneous green timber, which shortened the ships' service lives. As shortages continued after the war ended in 1865, ships were left half-built in the yards for years in an attempt to season the wood. Green, or undried, timber was undesirable as it had a tendency to shrink, rot, and leave a ship in need of uneconomic repair.

She was commissioned on 21 May 1867 and named Guerriere, after the victory of USS Constitution over HMS Guerriere during the War of 1812. She was ordered to serve as the flagship of the South Atlantic Squadron and left New York City on 28 June 1867. For the next two years, she operated with the squadron to protect American interests in South America. In 1869, she was relieved as flagship by USS Lancaster on 17 June and Guerriere returned to the United States. She was decommissioned upon her return, and was reactivated in August 1870. On 27 September, she embarked the body of Admiral David G. Farragut at Portsmouth, New Hampshire, intended for transport to New York. A day into the voyage, Guerriere ran aground off Nantucket and the body was transferred onto the steamboat Island Home. The sloop was freed on 1 August, and reached New York.

On 17 December 1870, she left the city and sailed to join the Mediterranean Squadron through the Strait of Gibraltar. On 7 April 1871, Guerriere hosted the pasha of Tripoli, who presented the anchor of USS Philadelphia to her captain. The anchor rested on the city's beach for more than 50 years after the frigate was scuttled during the First Barbary War. Other nations visited during the cruise included Egypt, Lebanon, Italy and France. On 1 December 1871, the sloop docked in Villefranche-sur-Mer and brought aboard the body of Major General Robert Anderson, who led the defense of Fort Sumter. The transported the body to Fort Monroe, Virginia, and arrived on 6 February 1872. Back in the United States, she was decommissioned at the New York Navy Yard and was decommissioned on 22 March 1872. On 12 December, she was sold off.

== Sources ==
=== Print ===
- Canney, Donald L. (1990). The Old Steam Navy Volume 1: Frigates, Sloops and Gunboats, 1815–1885. Naval Institute Press. ISBN 978-0870210044.
- Caiella, J.M. (April 2016). "The Wampanoag: 'Germ Idea' of the Battlecruiser". Naval History. 30 (2). ISSN 1042-1920.
- Campbell, N. J. M. (1979). "United States". In Chesneau, Roger; Kolesnik, Eugene M. (eds.). Conway's All the World's Fighting Ships, 1860–1905. New York City: Mayflower Books. pp. 114–169. ISBN 978-0-8317-0302-8.
- Kinnaman, Stephen Chapin (2022). John Lenthall: The Life of a Naval Constructor. Vernon Press. ISBN 978-1-64889-437-4.
- LaGrone, Sam (3 June 2025). "SECNAV Tasked to Rename USNS Harvey Milk; Report Says Other Ship Renamings Under Consideration". USNI News.
- Sloan, III, Edward W. (1965). "Isherwood's Masterpiece". Proceedings of the United States Naval Institute. 91 (12).
- Small, Stephen C. (August 2002). "The Wampanoag Goes on Trial". Naval History. 16 (4). United States Naval Institute. ISSN 1042-1920.
- Silverstone, Paul (2006). Civil War Navies, 1855-1883. U.S. Navy Warship Series. Routledge. ISBN 978-0415978705.

=== Online ===
- "Guerriere II (ScSlp)". www.history.navy.mil. Dictionary of American Naval Fighting Ships. 6 July 2015. Archived from the original on 2024-05-25.
- Quarstein, John V. (2021-08-21). "Roll, Alabama, Roll! - Sinking of CSS Alabama". Mariners' Museum and Park. Archived from the original on June 23, 2024.
- "Supplying Warships · Liverpool's Abercromby Square and the Confederacy During the U.S. Civil War ·". ldhi.library.cofc.edu. Lowcountry Digital History Initiative. Archived from the original on July 19, 2024.
- "The Evolution of Ship Naming in the U.S. Navy". Naval History and Heritage Command. Archived from the original on 10 Feb 2025.
