= South Carolina (disambiguation) =

South Carolina is a state in the United States.

South Carolina may also refer to:

== Schools ==
- University of South Carolina, a public university in South Carolina
  - South Carolina Gamecocks, the school's athletic program

== Ships ==
- Indien (1780) or South Carolina, a frigate of the South Carolina Navy
- USS South Carolina, a list of ships of the United States Navy
  - South Carolina-class battleship, a class of US Navy battleship

== Territories ==
- Province of South Carolina, during the colonial era
- Republic of South Carolina, during the U.S. Civil War

== Music ==
- "South Carolina (Barnwell)", a song by Gil Scott-Heron and Brian Jackson from the album From South Africa to South Carolina, 1975
- "South Carolina", a song by Outlaws from the album Lady in Waiting, 1976
- "South Carolina", a song by John Linnell from the album State Songs, 1999
