= Orakabeza (1785 ship) =

History

Great Britain
- Name: Orakabeza
- Namesake: Oracabessa
- Builder: Hull
- Launched: 1785
- Fate: Burnt 1797

General characteristics
- Tons burthen: 400 (bm)
- Armament: 2 × 4-pounder guns

Orakabeza (or Aracabessa in some United States sources), was launched in 1785 at Hull as a West Indiaman. A French privateer captured and burnt her in a notable incident that violated the neutrality of the United States.

== Career ==
Orakabeza first appeared Lloyd's Register (LR) in 1786. It gave the name of her master as C.Burton, that of her owner as Burton, Senior, and her trade as Hull, changing to London–Jamaica.

Year	Master	Owner	Trade	Source
1790	C. Burton	Burton, Senior	London–Jamaica	LR
1795	Js Burn	Burton	London–Jamaica	LR

== Fate ==
Captain Jonathon Storey loaded Oracabissa with sugar and rum at Jamaica and in early October sailed for England. Oracabissa ran into a gale that damaged her masts and caused a leak. She arrived at Charleston around 9 October and crossed the bar on 16 October.

On 17 October 1797 a French privateer believed to be Vortitude (or Vertitude or Fortitude), commanded by a Captain Jourdain and belonging to Cape Francois, captured and burnt Oracabessa within the bar of Charleston Harbour, in violation of the United States's neutrality. Governor Charles Pinckney forwarded to President John Adams affidavits about the incident. Pinckney stated that he had dispatched the cutter USRC South Carolina to the scene, but that by the time she arrived Oracabessa had burnt and the privateer had fled. (Note: For a detailed account of the capture and the political context, see Zeig (2019).)

Lloyd's List (LL) reported on 15 December 1797 that a French privateer had burnt Orracabeza, Storey, master, off Charleston. Orracabeza had been sailing from Jamaica to London.
