= Henry S. Webster =

- Born: January 7, 1846; Stockholm, New York, US
- Died: July 2, 1910 (aged 64); Brattleboro, Vermont, US
- Burial place: Cedar Grove Cemetery, Fair Haven, Vermont
- Military career
- Allegiance: United States of America; Union
- Branch: United States Navy; Union Navy
- Rank: Landsman
- Unit: USS Susquehanna (1850)
- Conflicts: American Civil War • Second Battle of Fort Fisher
- Awards: Medal of Honor

Henry S. Webster (January 7, 1846 – July 2, 1910) was a sailor in the U.S. Navy stationed aboard the USS Susquehanna (1850) during the American Civil War. He received the Medal of Honor for his actions during the Second Battle of Fort Fisher on January 15, 1865.

== Military service ==
Webster volunteered for service in the U.S. Navy and was assigned to the Union steamer USS Susquehanna (1850). His enlistment is credited to the state of New York.

On January 15, 1865, the North Carolina Confederate stronghold of Fort Fisher was taken by a combined Union storming party of sailors, marines, and soldiers under the command of Admiral David Dixon Porter and General Alfred Terry. Webster was a member of the storming party.

== Medal of Honor citation ==
The President of the United States of America, in the name of Congress, takes pleasure in presenting the Medal of Honor to Landsman Henry S. Webster, United States Navy, for extraordinary heroism in action while serving on board the U.S.S. Susquehanna during the assault on Fort Fisher, North Carolina, 15 January 1865. When enemy fire halted the attempt by his landing party to enter the fort and more than two-thirds of the men fell back along the open beach, Landsman Webster voluntarily remained with one of his wounded officers, under fire, until aid could be obtained to bring him to the rear.

General Orders: War Department, General Orders No. 59 (June 22, 1865)

Action Date: January 15, 1865

Service: Navy

Rank: Landsman

Division: U.S.S. Susquehanna

== See also ==
- List of Medal of Honor recipients
- List of American Civil War Medal of Honor recipients: T–Z
