= Java-class frigate (1863) =

US Navy screw frigates (1860s–1880s)

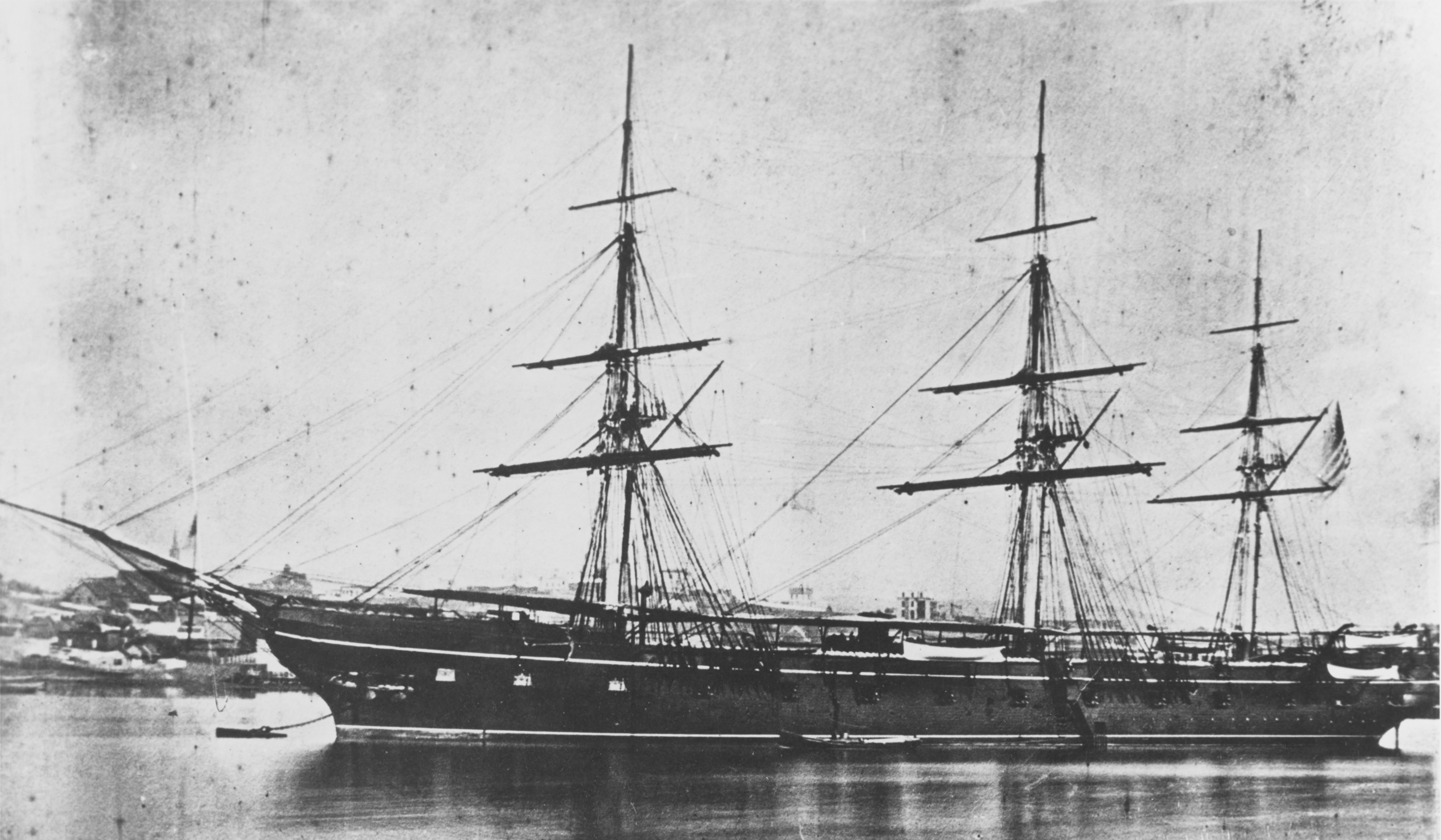
- USS California, formally Minnetonka, in the early 1870s

Class overview
- Name: Java class
- Builders: Philadelphia Navy Yard; Boston Navy Yard; Portsmouth Navy Yard; New York Navy Yard
- Operators: Union Navy; United States Navy
- Built: 1863–1864
- In commission: 1867–1888
- Planned: 10
- Completed: 3
- Canceled: 6
- Retired: 4

General characteristics
- Class & type: Wooden screw frigate
- Displacement: 3,953 long tons (4,016 t)
- Length: 95.25 m (312 ft 6 in) lbp; 96.47 m (316 ft 6 in) loa
- Beam: 14.01 m (46 ft 0 in)
- Draft: 5.26 metres (17 ft 3 in)
- Propulsion: 4 boilers; 1 steam engine; 1 propeller shaft
- Speed: 12–13 knots (22–24 km/h; 14–15 mph)
- Complement: 325
- Armament: 2 × 6.4 in (160 mm) Parrott RML guns; 1 × 5.3 in (130 mm) Parrott RML gun; 18 × 9 in (229 mm) SB guns (Guerriere had 6); 2–4 × 4 in (102 mm) RML boat guns
- Notes: Piscataqua had 20 × 9-inch SB guns

The Java class was a series of ten wooden-hulled steam frigates ordered by the United States Navy during the American Civil War. Construction of the ships was significantly delayed with the war's end, and ultimately, only four ships were launched. Of those, only three went to sea and served brief careers due to poor wood quality and a lack of funding. The ships were designed with the ability to attack merchant shipping at sea, which was planned to deter a war with European powers in the post-war era.

== Development ==
Despite the United Kingdom's official stance of neutrality during the American Civil War, British assets were used to support the rebelling Confederacy, particularly in the development of its navy. Shipyards in Liverpool indiscreetly constructed blockade runners and privateers for the Confederates, exploiting a legal loophole by ensuring the vessels were not armed until they reached Portugal. Among these ships were CSS Alabama, Florida, and Alexandra, which wreaked havoc on Union shipping; Alabama alone was responsible for destroying 65 merchant vessels.

The Union Navy was alarmed by these developments, as the disruption of American trade routes drove up domestic prices, damaged the economy, and forced the reassignment of ships from blockade duties against the South. By 1863, the Union, already provoked by these developments, feared that Britain might intervene to support the Confederates directly - a scenario that would have left the Union Navy hopelessly outmatched by the Royal Navy. Faced with that prospect, the Union Navy began planning for a possible war with the United Kingdom. While the Union fleet could not match the Royal Navy in conventional battles, the plan called for employing tactics similar to those used by the Confederacy: commerce raiding. By using cruisers to launch hit-and-run attacks on British ports and merchant shipping, the Union hoped to make a war too costly for Britain to justify, ultimately forcing it back into neutrality.

For the new role, the Navy developed a breed of warship known as "commerce destroyers" that had the range and speed to intercept enemy ships at sea. Twenty-seven such ships were ordered by Congress in 1863, split into three classes varying in size, speed, and armament. The smallest was the Contoocook-class sloop, largest and fastest was the Wampanoag-class frigate, and the most well armed was the Java-class frigate.

The new ships were built according to a new doctrine of the Navy planned for the post-war era. Congress was only interested in a Navy that could directly protect the United States, not one that could rival the Royal or French Navies. Instead of large, costly, ocean-going ironclads such as USS Dunderburg, the legislator wanted the Navy to only consist of coastal ironclads that would protect the shoreline and "commerce destroyers" to operate out at sea and deter aggression from said navies.

== Design ==
The class was designed and laid down in the final years of the American Civil War, and incorporated the United States Navy's wartime experience and technological advancements. The design was based on the Contoocook-class, with a larger emphasis on armament at the cost of speed.

While dimensions varied slightly between ships, they typically displaced 3,953 long tons (4,016 t) and measured 312.5 feet (95.3 m) at the waterline, with an overall length of 316.5 feet (96.5 m), a beam of 46 feet (14 m), and a draft of 17.25 feet (5.26 m). Each ship was powered by a single-shaft steam engine driven by four boilers, two of which featurered superheaters. They were capable of speeds between 12 and 13 knots (22 and 24 km/h; 14 and 15 mph), with a coal capacity of 480 long tons (490 t). The class was crewed by 325 officers and enlisted personnel. Aside from their rigging, the ships were also fitted with two funnels.

Armament varied by vessel. Guerriere and Minnetonka carried two 6.4-inch (16 cm) Parrott rifled muzzle-loading (RML) guns, one 5.3-inch (13 cm) Parrott RML, 18 9-inch (23 cm) Dahlgren smoothbore (SB) guns, and two to four 4-inch (10 cm) RML boat guns, the difference was that Guerriere was fitted with only six Dahlgren guns. Piscataqua was instead armed with twenty 9-inch SB guns.

=== Armored frigate variant ===
The last two ships in the class, Hassalo and Watauga, were planned on being built as armored frigates with a layer of steel armor fitted on the hull and around the gun mounts. The ships had a higher displacement, measuring at 3,365 short tons (3,053 t; 3,004 long tons) burthen compared to 3,177 short tons (2,882 t; 2,837 long tons) of the original design. They were listed as being armed with either 13 or 25 guns of unspecified type. Neither ship was laid down and were later canceled.

== History ==
Following the end of the Civil War, the Navy was stripped of funding, which left many construction projects abandoned. Of the four frigates which managed to enter service, the use of unseasoned (green) wood in their hulls ensured brief careers due to war-time supply shortages of high-quality material and the need to have the ships in service as early as possible. While Illinois, Java, Kewaydin, and Ontario were broken up at the shipyard after sitting on their stocks for decades, only Guerriere, Minnetonka, and Piscataqua went to sea, with Antietam's hull used as a storage hulk. After several of the ships were renamed after states, California (ex-Minnetonka) served as the flagship of the US Pacific Fleet while Delaware (ex-Piscataqua) went to the Asiatic and Guerriere served in the Atlantic. After less than ten years of service, the three operable ships were sold off due to degraded and rotten wood. Antietam, which was never commissioned, was also used as floating barracks at League Island, Pennsylvania, before she was sold off in 1888.

== Ships in class ==
Below is a list of every ship of the class along with key information about each one.

Name	Builder	Laid	Launched	Commissioned	Fate	Notes
Guerriere	Boston Navy Yard	1863	1865	1867	Sold, 1872	Completed as a sloop
Minnetonka	Portsmouth Navy Yard	1863	1867	1870	Sold, 1875	Renamed California
Piscataqua	Portsmouth Navy Yard	1863	1866	1867	Sank after decommissioning, 1876	Renamed Delaware
Antietam	Philadelphia Navy Yard	1863	1875	1876	Sold, 1888	Launched without engines, used as hulk
Illinois	Portsmouth Navy Yard	1864	–	–	Broken up, 1872	
Java	New York Navy Yard	1863	–	–	Broken up, 1884	
Kewaydin	Boston Navy Yard	1864	–	–	Broken up, 1884	Renamed Pennsylvania
Ontario	New York Navy Yard	1863	–	–	Broken up, 1888	Renamed New York
Hassalo	–	–	–	–	Canceled	Armored frigate varrient
Watauga	–	–	–	–	Canceled	Armored frigate varrient
