= USS Chattanooga (1864) =

Unused wooden steam ship

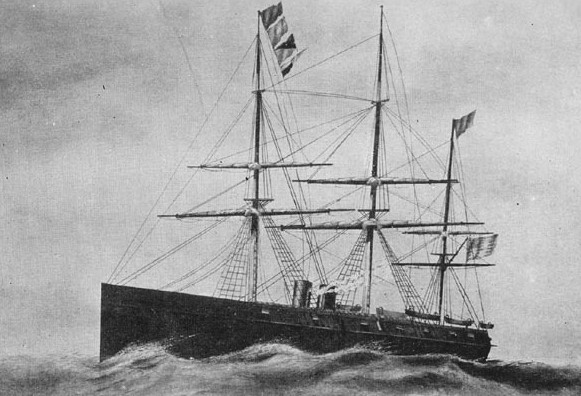
- Chattanooga as designed.

History

United States
- Name: USS Chattanooga
- Namesake: Chattanooga, Tennessee
- Builder: William Cramp & Sons, Philadelphia
- Yard number: 126
- Laid down: 1863
- Launched: 13 October 1864
- Commissioned: 16 May 1866
- Decommissioned: 3 September 1866 at the Philadelphia Navy Yard
- Fate: Sunk by ice, December 1871; Hulk, sold January 1872

General characteristics
- Type: Wooden screw frigate
- Displacement: 3,043 long tons (3,092 t)
- Length: 315 ft (96.0 m) (Length of deck)
- Beam: 46 ft (14.0 m)
- Draught: 20 ft 6 in (6.2 m)
- Installed power: 2,000 ihp (1,500 kW)
- Propulsion: 1 shaft; 2 × horizontal back-acting steam engines; 8 × boilers
- Sail plan: Ship rig
- Speed: 13 knots (24 km/h; 15 mph)
- Armament: 8 × 8-inch (203 mm) smoothbore Dahlgren guns; 3 × 60-pounder Parrott rifles

USS Chattanooga was constructed during the final years of the American Civil War, but was not commissioned because the war was winding down in the Union’s favor. She was eventually placed into reserve until she was holed by ice in 1871.

== History ==
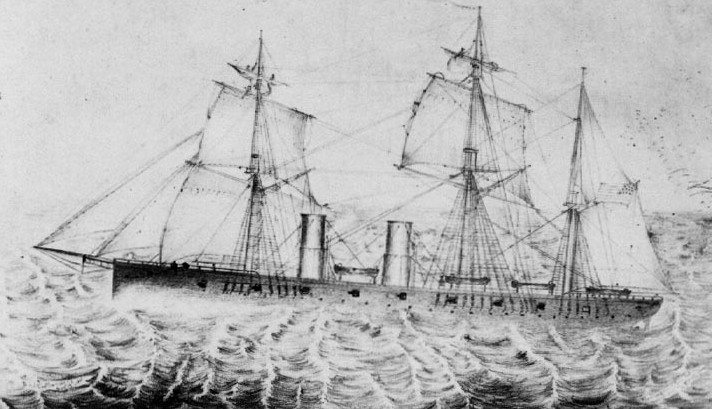
Chattanooga's final configuration.

The first U.S. Navy ship to be so named, was built in Philadelphia, a screw steamer, was launched 13 October 1864 by William Cramp & Sons, and completed by the Philadelphia Navy Yard. Commissioned on 16 May 1866 with Captain J. P. McKinstry in command. The ship was named after the city of Chattanooga, Tennessee. After sea trials in August 1866, Chattanooga returned to the Philadelphia Navy Yard where she was decommissioned 3 September 1866. She remained inactive there and at League Island, where in December 1871 she was holed and sunk at her dock by floating ice. The hulk was sold in January 1872.

== See also ==
- List of steam frigates of the United States Navy
- Union Navy
- Confederate States Navy
- Bibliography of American Civil War naval history
