= USRC South Carolina =

History

United States
- Name: South Carolina
- Namesake: South Carolina
- Operator: Revenue Cutter Service
- Launched: 1793
- Commissioned: 1793
- Decommissioned: 1798
- Fate: Sold 5 June 1798

General characteristics
- Class & type: Schooner
- Tons burthen: 35 (bm)
- Length: N/A
- Beam: N/A
- Draft: N/A
- Propulsion: Sail
- Crew: 4 officers, 4 enlisted, 2 boys
- Armament: 4 swivel guns

USRC South Carolina was one of the first ten cutters operated by the United States' Revenue Cutter Service (later to become the US Coast Guard).

== Operational service ==
South Carolina was not launched until 1793, however, due to the recalcitrance of state officials who were loath to support or enforce the United States' customs and navigation laws. Nevertheless, her Master, Robert Cochran, drew his pay during the time of her construction and so therefore probably chartered a private vessel to conduct patrols until the South Carolina entered service. He is listed as Master 8 May, 1791.

Little is known about this cutter other than that she was a schooner 38 tons burthen. Her journals and official correspondence have not survived and there is little mention of her in local papers. The only incident that garnered published notice was when the governor ordered the cutter to transport a company of soldiers (artillerymen from Fort Johnson) down the waterway to protect a stranded British merchant vessel, the Aracabessa, from another vessel that may have been a French privateer. By the time the cutter got underway and arrived at the scene, Aracabessa was burning from stem to stern. The privateer was nowhere to be seen and later captured two American vessels further out to sea.

The South Carolina State Gazette noted:

On Tuesday, the 17th inst. [1797] when the Revenue Cutter was ordered by the governor to go down to five fathom hole to protect the English ship Oracabessa from the French pirate who burned her, a detachment of 20 of Capt. Kaldensen's corps of Artillerists was put on board. By the time they got to Cumming's Point only five of the 20, and the commanding officer, Lieut. Robertson, were able to keep their feet, all the remainder were thrown down with sea sickness -- a clear proof that we stand in need of other marines for our celebrated cutter than the artillerists of a fort.

It would be a few years before the Marine Corps and the Revenue cutters cooperated but the suggestion was prescient. Depredations such as that which befell Aracabessa and the American merchant ships, among others, did motivate the government to begin building a navy.

South Carolina was sold on 5 June 1798 to Captain Oliver Pendleton for $630.00.
