= USS Piscataqua (1866) =

US Navy sloop

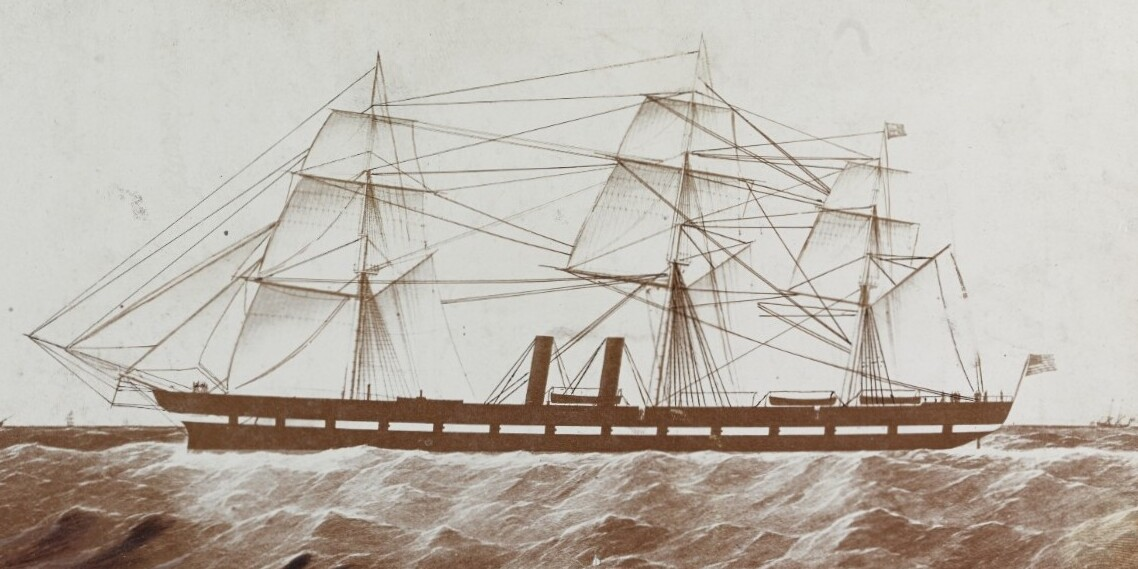
- Painting of USS Delaware as flagship of the Asiatic Squadron, c. 1867

History

United States
- Name: Piscataqua (1864–1869); Delaware (1869–1870)
- Ordered: 1863
- Builder: Portsmouth Navy Yard
- Launched: 11 June 1866
- Commissioned: 21 October 1867
- Decommissioned: 5 December 1870
- Fate: Scrapped, 1877

General characteristics
- Type: Java-class frigate
- Tonnage: 3,954 short tons (3,530 long tons)
- Length: lbp: 312 feet 6 inches (95.25 m); oa: 336 feet 6 inches (102.57 m)
- Beam: 46 feet (14 m)
- Draft: 21 feet 5 inches (6.53 m)
- Propulsion: 6 × boilers; 2 × engines; 1 × propeller; Sails
- Speed: 13 knots (24 km/h; 15 mph)
- Complement: 325
- Armament: 16-18 × 9 in (230 mm) Dahlgren guns; 2 × 100 lb (45 kg) Parrott rifles; 1 × 60 lb (27 kg) rifle

USS Piscataqua was a Java-class sloop of the United States Navy. She was laid down by the Union Navy during the American Civil War to deter British intervention in 1864, although timber shortages delayed progress. The sloop was launched in 1866 and commissioned the next year. Between 1867 and 1870, she operated as the flagship of the Asiatic Squadron. She was renamed Delaware as part of a fleet-wide renaming effort in 1869 and returned to the United States the next year. Her hull was found to be rotted due to usage of poor quality timber in her construction, and the ship was decommissioned. The ship was laid up and sank at her moorings in 1876 before she was sold off for scrap a year later.

== Development ==
During the American Civil War, the Confederate States used British-built privateers to hamper Union trade instead of directly challenging the Union Navy. One such privateer, CSS Alabama, was responsible for destroying 65 merchant vessels. The disruption of Union trade routes drove up domestic prices, damaged the economy, and forced the reassignment of ships from blockade duties against the South. The United States feared that the United Kingdom would directly intervene to support the Confederacy—a scenario that would have left the Union Navy outmatched by the Royal Navy. In response, the Union Navy began planning for a possible war. While the American fleet could not match the British in conventional battles, the plan called for employing tactics similar to those used by the Confederacy: commerce raiding. By using cruisers to launch hit-and-run attacks on British ports and merchant shipping, the Union hoped to make a war too costly for Britain to justify, ultimately forcing it back into neutrality.

For the new role, the Union Navy developed "commerce destroyers" that had the range and speed to intercept enemy ships at sea. Twenty-seven such ships were ordered by Congress in 1863, split into three classes varying in size, speed, and armament. The most well armed of these designs became known as the Java-class sloop. By 1864, the new ships were built according to a new doctrine of the Navy for the post-war era. Congress was only interested in a navy that could directly protect the United States, not one that could rival the Royal or French Navies. Instead of large, costly, ocean-going ironclads such as USS Dunderburg, the legislators wanted the Navy to only consist of coastal ironclads that would protect the shoreline and commerce destroyers to operate out at sea and deter aggression from foreign nations.

== Design ==
The Java or Guerriere-class were envisioned as large screw-sloops with spar decks. The design featured an overall length of 336 feet 6 inches (102.57 m), length between perpendiculars of 312 feet 6 inches (95.25 m), beam of 46 feet (14 m), draft of 21 feet 5 inches (6.53 m), displacement of 3,954 short tons (3,530 long tons), and a complement of 325. Piscataqua was equipped with four main boilers and two superheating boilers, which provided steam to two horizontal back action steam 36 in (91 cm) stroke engines that turned one propeller powered by 540 short tons (480 long tons) of coal. The ships had two funnels and wooden hulls reinforced by iron braces. Ships of the class were fully rigged and carried 23,820 square feet (2,213 m^{2}) of sail, excluding top sails, on three masts. Under steam and sail, Piscataqua reached speeds up to 13 knots (24 km/h; 15 mph). Armament consisted of either sixteen or eighteen 9 in (23 cm) Dahlgren guns and two 100 lb (45 kg) Parrott rifles on the gun deck to form the broadside while a 60 lb (27 kg) rifle was mounted on the spar deck.

== Service history ==
In 1864, Piscataqua's keel was laid down at the Portsmouth Navy Yard, and she was launched on 11 June 1866. Like many other shipbuilding projects during the war, construction was rushed to get ships into service as soon as possible. A shortage of seasoned timber led to the class built out of heterogeneous green timber, which shortened the ships' service lives. As shortages continued after the war ended in 1865, ships were left half-built in the yards for years in an attempt to season the wood. Green, or undried, timber was undesirable as it had a tendency to shrink, rot, and leave a ship in need of uneconomic repair. Piscataqua was finally commissioned on 21 October 1867. In December, she sailed for Singapore and operated as the flagship of the flagship of the United States Navy's Asiatic Squadron. Over the next year, she visited ports in China, Japan, and the Philippines while protecting American interests in East Asia.

The sloop was initially named Piscataqua, after the Piscataqua River between Maine and New Hampshire. However, Adolph Borie, the Secretary of the Navy, disapproved of warships with Native American-sounding names and the unclear naming standards used across the fleet. As a result, he ordered a systematic renaming of vessels. The ship was renamed Delaware—after the tribe of Native Americans, river, and state—on 15 May 1869. The sloop returned to the United States in 1870. Due to the green wood used during her construction, her hull was described as, "very rotten" after her return, and she was decommissioned on 5 December. She was then laid up before she sank at her dock in 1876, and was sold off the next year.

== Sources ==
=== Print ===
- Canney, Donald L. (1990). The Old Steam Navy Volume 1: Frigates, Sloops and Gunboats, 1815–1885. Naval Institute Press. ISBN 978-0870210044.
- Caiella, J.M. (April 2016). "The Wampanoag: 'Germ Idea' of the Battlecruiser". Naval History. 30 (2). ISSN 1042-1920.
- Campbell, N. J. M. (1979). "United States". In Chesneau, Roger; Kolesnik, Eugene M. (eds.). Conway's All the World's Fighting Ships, 1860–1905. New York City: Mayflower Books. pp. 114–169. ISBN 978-0-8317-0302-8.
- Kinnaman, Stephen Chapin (2022). John Lenthall: The Life of a Naval Constructor. Vernon Press. ISBN 978-1-64889-437-4.
- LaGrone, Sam (3 June 2025). "SECNAV Tasked to Rename USNS Harvey Milk; Report Says Other Ship Renamings Under Consideration". USNI News.
- Sloan, III, Edward W. (1965). "Isherwood's Masterpiece". Proceedings of the United States Naval Institute. 91 (12).
- Small, Stephen C. (August 2002). "The Wampanoag Goes on Trial". Naval History. 16 (4). United States Naval Institute. ISSN 1042-1920.
- Silverstone, Paul (2006). Civil War Navies, 1855-1883. U.S. Navy Warship Series. Routledge. ISBN 978-0415978705.

=== Online ===
- "Delaware V (Screw-Steamer)". www.history.navy.mil. Dictionary of American Naval Fighting Ships. 6 July 2015.
- "Piscataqua I (ScStr)". www.history.navy.mil. Dictionary of American Naval Fighting Ships. 21 August 2015.
- Quarstein, John V. (21 August 2021). "Roll, Alabama, Roll! - Sinking of CSS Alabama". Mariners' Museum and Park. Archived from the original on 23 June 2024.
- "Supplying Warships · Liverpool's Abercromby Square and the Confederacy During the U.S. Civil War ·". ldhi.library.cofc.edu. Lowcountry Digital History Initiative. Archived from the original on 19 July 2024.
- "The Evolution of Ship Naming in the U.S. Navy". Naval History and Heritage Command. Archived from the original on 10 February 2025.
