= Steam warship classification =

The Steam warship classification system used during the 19th century was a classification scheme for the comparison of steam warships, including steam frigates and steam sloops. The system originally classified steam warships according to the thrown weight of their broadsides, then rated them by tonnage, using separate standards for ironclad and non-ironclad ships, with allowances for sailing ships still in commission. It was used in the United States and United Kingdom, officially and unofficially. The United States Navy adopted the system by 1875.

== Ratings ==
=== First system (Civil War-at least 1870) ===
(Weights given are representative)

Type	Shot weight (lbs)
First Rate	2,606
Second Rate	1,220
Third Rate	434
Fourth Rate	210 / 294

=== Second system (by 1875) ===
Type	Tonnage (non-ironclad)	Tonnage (ironclad)
First Rate (also sailing ships-of-the-line)	4000 +	8000 +
Second Rate (also sailing frigates)	2000 - 4000	2000 - 8000
Third Rate (also sailing sloops of war)	900 - 2000	1200 - 2000
Fourth Rate (also dispatch vessels and store ships)	0 - 800	0 - 800
