= USS Poppy =

Tugboat of the United States Navy

History

United States
- Name: USS Poppy
- Ordered: as Addie Douglass
- Launched: 1862
- Acquired: 31 October 1863
- Commissioned: 10 November 1863
- Decommissioned: circa 30 November 1865
- Stricken: 1865 (est.)
- Fate: Sold, 30 November 1865

General characteristics
- Displacement: 93 tons
- Length: 88 ft (27 m)
- Beam: 19 ft (5.8 m)
- Draft: 7 ft 3 in (2.21 m)
- Propulsion: steam engine; screw-propelled
- Speed: 8 knots (15 km/h; 9.2 mph)
- Complement: not known
- Armament: 1 × 12-pounder rifle; 1 × heavy 12-pounder smoothbore

USS Poppy was a steamer commissioned by the Union Navy during the American Civil War.

She served the Navy during the blockade of ports and waterways of the Confederate States of America in a variety of ways: as a tugboat, a ship’s tender, a mail and supply tug, an ordnance tug, and finally as a ram if the opportunity presented itself.

== Purchased at Philadelphia ==
Poppy (Screw Tug), originally white oak steamer Addie Douglass, was purchased at Philadelphia 31 October 1863 from J. Alderdice; renamed Poppy; and commissioned 10 November 1863.

== Civil War service ==
During the Civil War, Poppy served as a ship's tender to the North Atlantic Blockading Squadron. On 25 November 1863 she was with ironclad USS Roanoke off Newport News, Virginia. On 4 February 1864 she was in Hampton Roads, Virginia. By 17 March she was back off Newport News, again serving as a picket guard for ironclad Roanoke.

On the night of 8 April a small boat succeeded in attacking frigate USS Minnesota, flagship of the North Atlantic Blockading Squadron, with a torpedo, making a clean escape. Poppy was ordered to ram the intruder, but was unable to do so because her steam was not up.

Poppy was then used as mail and supply tug until 17 June when she was stationed in the James River above Wilson’s Wharf as a tender and ram to ironclads. Late in the year she became a tug in Hampton Roads and operated there and in the James River, becoming an ordnance tug at Norfolk, Virginia, in April 1865.

== Post-war deactivation ==
She was sold at New York City 30 November 1865 to William Farrington.
