= USS Wampanoag (1864) =

Post Civil War US Navy Screw Frigate

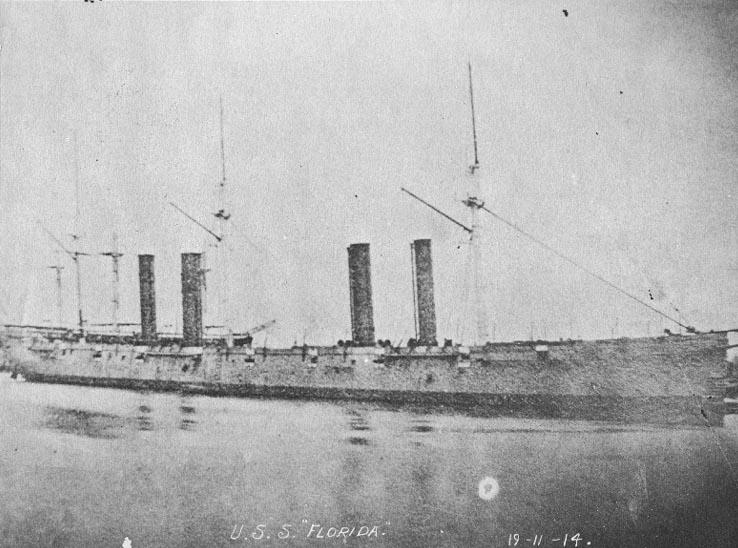
- USS Florida, formerly Wampanoag. Probably photographed at New York, 1869.

History

United States
- Name: USS Wampanoag
- Builder: New York Navy Yard
- Laid down: 3 August 1863
- Launched: 15 December 1864
- Commissioned: 17 September 1867
- Decommissioned: 5 May 1868
- Renamed: Florida, 15 May 1869
- Fate: Sold, 27 February 1885

General characteristics
- Type: Screw frigate
- Displacement: 4,215 long tons (4,283 t)
- Length: 355 ft (108 m)
- Beam: 45 ft 2 in (13.77 m)
- Draft: 19 ft (5.8 m)
- Propulsion: 8 × coal-burning fire-tube boilers, (4 with superheaters); 2 × compound reciprocating steam engines; 1 × 4-bladed 19 ft (6 m) propeller
- Speed: 18 knots (33 km/h; 21 mph)
- Armament: 10 × 8 in (200 mm) smoothbore gun; 2 × 100-pounder (45 kg) guns; 2 × 24-pounder (11 kg) howitzer; 2 × 12-pounder (5 kg) howitzer; 1 × 60-pounder (27 kg) rifled pivot gun

The first USS Wampanoag was a screw frigate in the United States Navy built during the American Civil War.

== Development and design ==
Commerce raiding by CSS Alabama and CSS Florida, both built in English yards, reached a point in 1863 where continued peaceful relations between the United States and Great Britain were seriously jeopardized. As a result, Congress responded by authorizing construction of a new class of screw frigates as part of the naval procurement bill of that year. These vessels, designed to be the fastest in the world, were intended for use in hit-and-run operations against British ports and commerce in the event of war. Wampanoag was the lead ship of this class, which also included the Madawaska.

Wampanoag contained numerous design features unprecedented in American naval construction. Her hull — designed by clipper ship architect Benjamin Franklin Delano — was unusually long and tapered relative to the vessel's beam. Her machinery, developed by Naval Engineer Benjamin F. Isherwood, was unique for its geared steam engine in which slow-moving machinery coupled to fast-moving propulsion gear.

Tremendous debate caused by this design delayed construction, preventing Wampanoag from being completed in time to serve in the American Civil War. According to MIT professor and technology historian Elting E. Morison, the Navy's resistance to the ship's design reflected less a dispassionate appraisal of its merits than a prejudice against steam power generally, which senior decisionmakers saw as undermining the manly virtues that reliance on the sail supposedly cultivated.

== Service history ==
Wampanoag was laid down on 3 August 1863 by the New York Navy Yard; launched on 15 December 1864; sponsored by Miss Case, daughter of Capt. Augustus Ludlow Case, second-in-command of the navy yard; and commissioned on 17 September 1867, Capt. J. W. A. Nicholson in command.

=== Sea trials ===
The screw frigate finally left New York for sea trials on 7 February 1868. On 11 February, she commenced speed tests, running flat-out in rough weather from Barnegat Light, New Jersey, to Tybee Island, Georgia. She covered the distance of 633 nautical miles (1,172 km) in 38 hours for an average sustained speed of 16.6 knots (31 km/h), at one point making 17.75 knots (33 km/h). However, the validity of these trials has been called into question: all speeds were recorded out of sight of land, making their measurement less accurate, (Note: A 1927 reappraisal of the trials suggested that the distance could have overstated by up to 30 miles.) and may have been assisted by offshore currents. This record for a United States Navy vessel stood for 21 years until it was broken by USS Charleston (C-2), though HMS Mercury (1878) achieved 18.6 knots on her trial a decade later. However, the wooden gear wheels used in the ship's unique geared engine wore down by 5/8 of an inch during the first voyage alone.

=== Deployment ===
From 22 February 1868 to 8 April, Wampanoag was deployed as flagship of the North Atlantic Fleet. On 5 May 1868, she decommissioned at the New York Navy Yard. Wampanoag was renamed Florida on 15 May 1869.

=== Condemnation ===
The controversy generated by the frigate's unconventional design reached a peak in 1869 when a naval commission examined and condemned the vessel. Rear Admiral Louis M. Goldsborough, Commodore Charles S. Boggs, and Engineers Edward D. Robie, John W. Moore, and Isaac Newton judged the ship unacceptable for active duty in the Navy. They complained of her unusually large machinery spaces and heavy coal consumption, and found particular fault with her narrow breadth relative to her length. The commission said this caused inordinate rolling and straining of the vessel. They calculated that of all the weight the hull could accommodate, 84% was taken up by engines, boilers and coal supplies, leaving only 16% for masts, sails, rigging, anchors, guns, provisions and water. Wampanoag also burned 136 tons of coal a day, enough for only five days of steaming: a serious handicap in a commerce raider which could be expected to spend most of its time chasing down enemy ships on the high seas. (Note: Brown points out that the design figure of 700 tons is suspect: he believes that the drawings do not show room for this amount and points out that her sister ship USS Tennessee (1863) carried only 380 tons after some of her engines and boilers were removed.) As a result, Florida remained in ordinary at New York for five years before departing on 5 March 1874, bound for New London, Connecticut, to become a receiving and store ship at the naval station there.

Florida remained at New London, rotting, until February 1885. She was sold, at New York, on 27 February 1885 to Edwin LeBars.

== See also ==
- List of steam frigates of the United States Navy
- Union Navy
- Union Blockade
