= USS California (1867) =

US Navy sloop

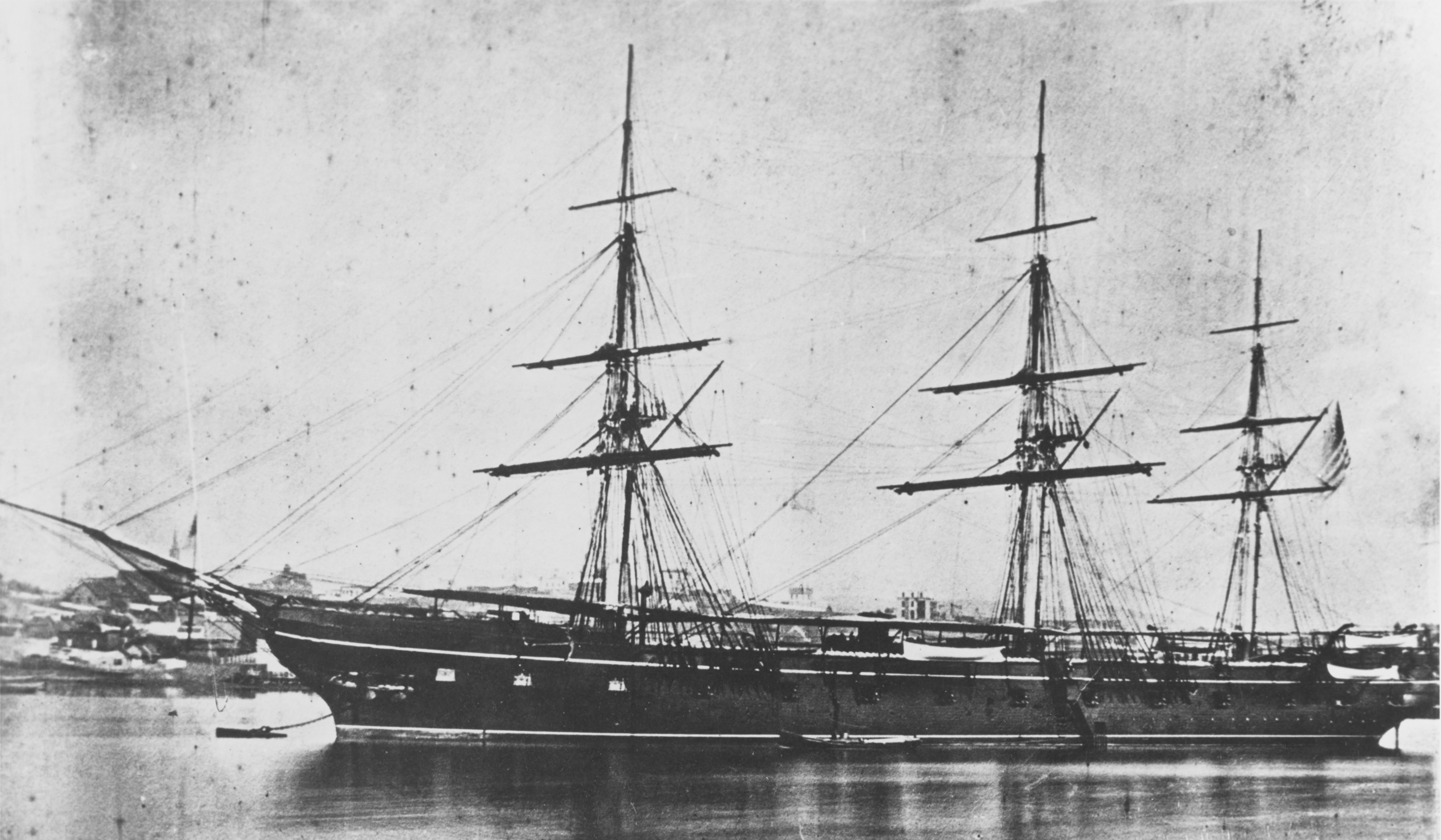
- USS California off the Mare Island Navy Yard, c. 1872

History

United States
- Name: Minnetonka (1864-1869); California (1869-1873)
- Namesake: State of California
- Ordered: 1863
- Builder: Portsmouth Navy Yard
- Laid down: 1864
- Launched: 3 July 1867
- Commissioned: 12 December 1870
- Out of service: 3 July 1873
- Fate: Sold, May 1875

General characteristics
- Type: Java-class sloop
- Tonnage: 3,954 short tons (3,530 long tons)
- Length: lbp: 312 feet 6 inches (95.25 m); oa: 336 feet 6 inches (102.57 m)
- Beam: 46 feet (14 m)
- Draft: 21 feet 5 inches (6.53 m)
- Propulsion: 6 × boilers; 2 × engines; 1 × propeller; Sails
- Speed: 13 knots (24 km/h; 15 mph)
- Complement: 325
- Armament: 16-18 × 9 in (230 mm) Dahlgren guns; 2 × 100-pounder Parrott rifles; 1 × 60 lb (27 kg) rifle

USS California was a Java-class wooden-hulled steam sloop of the United States Navy. She was laid down during the American Civil War to deter British intervention in 1864, although timber shortages and a rushed construction delayed progress. She was renamed from Minnetonka as part of a fleet-wide change in 1869 and was launched the next year. After two cruises as a flagship in the Pacific Ocean between 1871 and 1873, green wood used during her construction made repair uneconomical. As a result, she was decommissioned in 1873 and sold in 1875.

== Development ==
During the American Civil War, the Confederate States used British-built privateers to hamper Union trade instead of directly challenging the Union Navy. One such privateer, CSS Alabama, was responsible for attacking or destroying 65 commercial vessels. The disruption of Union trade routes drove up domestic prices, damaged the economy, and forced the reassignment of ships from blockade duties against the South. The United States feared that the United Kingdom would directly intervene to support the Confederacy—a scenario that would have left the Union Navy outmatched by the Royal Navy. In response, the Union Navy began planning for a possible war. While the American fleet could not match the British in conventional battles, the plan called for employing tactics similar to those used by the Confederacy: commerce raiding. By using cruisers to launch hit-and-run attacks on British ports and merchant shipping, the Union hoped to make a war too costly for Britain to justify, ultimately forcing it back into neutrality.

For the new role, the Navy developed "commerce destroyers" that had the range and speed to intercept enemy ships at sea. Twenty-seven such ships were ordered by Congress in 1863, split into three classes varying in size, speed, and armament. The most heavily armed of these designs became known as the Java-class sloop. By 1864, the new ships were built according to a new doctrine of the Navy for the post-war era. Congress was only interested in a navy that could directly protect the United States, not one that could rival the Royal or French Navies. Instead of large, costly, ocean-going ironclads such as USS Dunderburg, the legislators wanted the Navy to only consist of coastal ironclads that would protect the shoreline and commerce destroyers to operate out at sea and deter aggression from foreign nations.

== Design ==
The Java or Guerriere-class were envisioned as large screw-sloops with spar decks. The design featured an overall length of 336 feet 6 inches (102.57 m), length between perpendiculars of 312 feet 6 inches (95.25 m), beam of 46 feet (14 m), draft of 21 feet 5 inches (6.53 m), displacement of 3,954 short tons (3,530 long tons), and a complement of 325. Minnetonka was equipped with four main boilers and two superheating boilers, which provided steam to two horizontal back action steam 36 in (91 cm) stroke engines that turned one propeller powered by 540 short tons (480 long tons) of coal. The ships had two funnels and wooden hulls reinforced by iron braces. She was ship-rigged and carried 23,820 square feet (2,213 m^{2}) of sail, excluding top sails, on three masts. During her sea trials, she reached 11 knots (20 km/h; 13 mph) under steam and 13 knots (24 km/h; 15 mph) under steam and sail. Armament consisted of either sixteen or eighteen 9 in (23 cm) Dahlgren guns and two 100 lb (45 kg) Parrott rifles on the gun deck to form the broadside while a 60 lb (27 kg) rifle was mounted on the spar deck.

== Service history ==
In 1864, her keel was laid down at the Portsmouth Navy Yard, and she was launched on 3 July 1867. Like many other shipbuilding projects during the war, construction was rushed to get ships into service as soon as possible. A shortage of seasoned timber led to the class built out of heterogeneous green timber, which shortened the ships' service lives. As shortages continued after the war ended in 1865, ships were left half-built in the yards for years in an attempt to season the wood. Green, or undried, timber was undesirable as it had a tendency to shrink, rot, and leave a ship in need of financial unviable repair.

The sloop was initially named Minnetonka, after Lake Minnetonka in Minnesota. However, Adolph Borie, the Secretary of the Navy, disapproved of warships with Native American-sounding names and the unclear naming standards used across the fleet. As a result, he ordered a systematic renaming of vessels. The ship was renamed California—after the state—on 15 May 1869, and was finally commissioned on 12 December 1870. At some point, the ship was inspected by a post-war audit led by Admiral Louis Goldsborough. Her shallow hull and sharp ends were criticized, and the design was described as a, "poor specimen of an efficient vessel of war".

She was assigned to the Pacific Squadron, and left New York City on 13 March 1871 and arrived at San Francisco on 30 July. The 139-day voyage set a speed record for a warship on the route, although it was significantly slower than the 89-day record set by Flying Cloud. On her first cruise in the Pacific, she served as the flagship of Admiral John Winslow and visited ports in Hawaii, Chile, and Colombia. Her second cruise lasted between 30 December 1872 and 25 May 1873, when she served as Admiral Alexander Pennock's flagship of the North Pacific Station. Most of the voyage was spent protecting American interests in Honolulu. Due to her green wood, the ship was declared, "not worth the cost of repairs" following her return to the United States and the ship was decommissioned on 3 July 1873. After being laid up, California was sold off in May 1875.

== Sources ==
=== Print ===
- Canney, Donald L. (1990). The Old Steam Navy Volume 1: Frigates, Sloops and Gunboats, 1815–1885. Naval Institute Press. ISBN 978-0870210044.
- Caiella, J.M. (April 2016). "The Wampanoag: 'Germ Idea' of the Battlecruiser". Naval History. 30 (2). ISSN 1042-1920.
- Campbell, N. J. M. (1979). "United States". In Chesneau, Roger; Kolesnik, Eugene M. (eds.). Conway's All the World's Fighting Ships, 1860–1905. New York City: Mayflower Books. pp. 114–169. ISBN 978-0-8317-0302-8.
- Kinnaman, Stephen Chapin (2022). John Lenthall: The Life of a Naval Constructor. Vernon Press. ISBN 978-1-64889-437-4.
- LaGrone, Sam (3 June 2025). "SECNAV Tasked to Rename USNS Harvey Milk; Report Says Other Ship Renamings Under Consideration". USNI News.
- Sloan, III, Edward W. (1965). "Isherwood's Masterpiece". Proceedings of the United States Naval Institute. 91 (12).
- Small, Stephen C. (August 2002). "The Wampanoag Goes on Trial". Naval History. 16 (4). United States Naval Institute. ISSN 1042-1920.
- Silverstone, Paul (2006). Civil War Navies, 1855-1883. U.S. Navy Warship Series. Routledge. ISBN 978-0415978705.

=== Online ===
- "California I (Screw Sloop)". www.history.navy.mil. Dictionary of American Naval Fighting Ships. 8 March 2023.
- "Minnetonka". www.history.navy.mil. Dictionary of American Naval Fighting Ships. 10 August 2015.
- Quarstein, John V. (2021-08-21). "Roll, Alabama, Roll! - Sinking of CSS Alabama". Mariners' Museum and Park. Archived from the original on June 23, 2024.
- "Supplying Warships · Liverpool's Abercromby Square and the Confederacy During the U.S. Civil War ·". ldhi.library.cofc.edu. Lowcountry Digital History Initiative. Archived from the original on July 19, 2024.
- "The Evolution of Ship Naming in the U.S. Navy". Naval History and Heritage Command. Archived from the original on 10 Feb 2025.
