= USS South Carolina =

USS South Carolina may refer to:

- USS South Carolina (1798) was a schooner built in 1797 and later served the Revenue Cutter Service until 1803
- USS South Carolina (1799) was a coastal patrol vessel built in 1799 and sold in 1802
- USS South Carolina (1860) was a screw steamer built in 1860; served in the American Civil War and sold in 1866
- USS South Carolina (BB-26) was a South Carolina-class battleship launched in 1908 and sold for scrap in 1924
- USS South Carolina (CGN-37) was a California-class cruiser built in 1972 and decommissioned in 1999

== See also ==
- L'Indien was a frigate built in 1778 during the American Revolutionary War; renamed South Carolina, she served with the South Carolina Navy before the British captured her in 1782
- USRC South Carolina
