= USS Minnesota =

USS Minnesota may refer to the following ships of the United States Navy:

- USS Minnesota (1855) was a wooden steam frigate launched 1 December 1855 and sold in August 1901.
- USS Minnesota (BB-22) was a Connecticut-class battleship, launched 8 April 1905 and sold for scrap 23 January 1924.
- USS Minnesota (SSN-783) is a Virginia-class submarine, commissioned on September 7, 2013.

== See also ==
- USS Minnesotan
- SS Gopher State
