= Miami Trace High School =

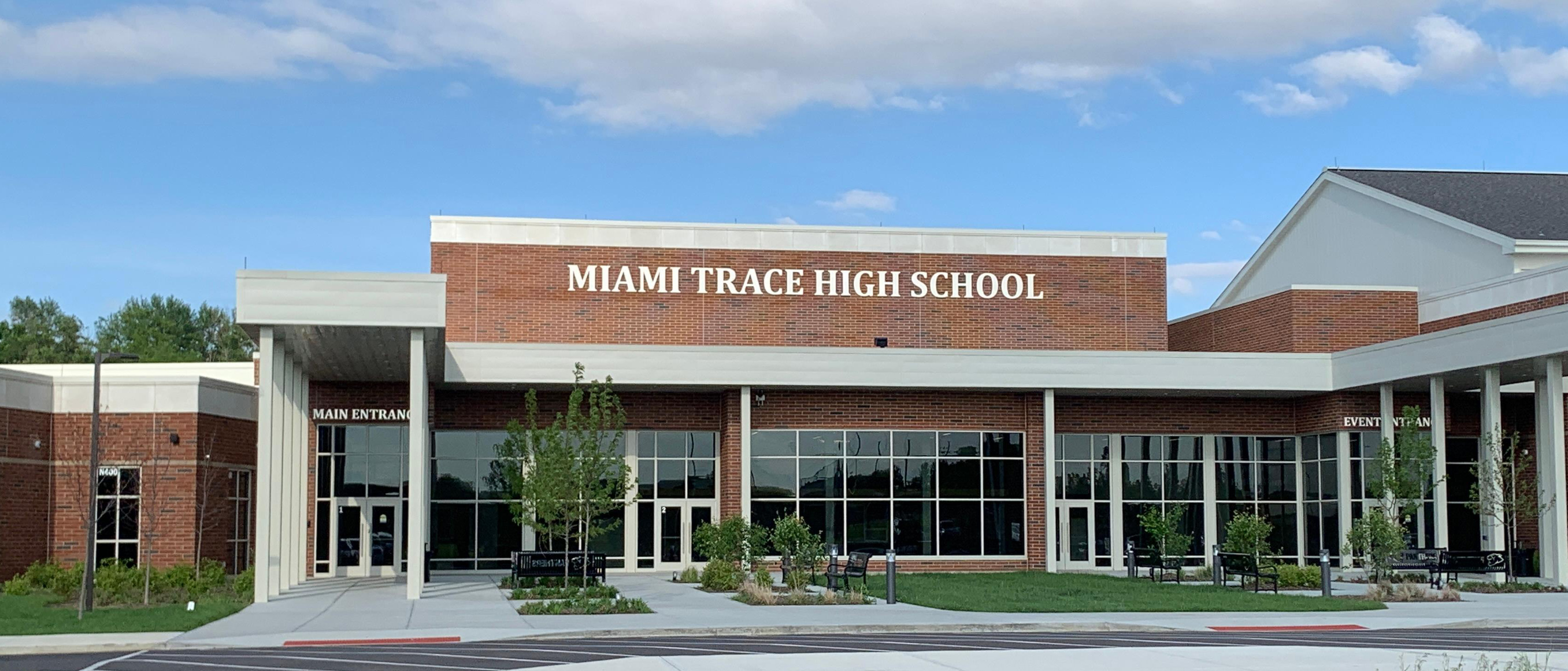

Location
- 300 Bloomingburg New Holland Rd NE; Washington Court House, Ohio 43160; United States; 39°34′36″N 83°28′19″W

Information
- Type: Public, Coeducational high school
- Established: 1955
- School district: Miami Trace Local School District
- Superintendent: Justin Lanman
- Principal: Jim Hatert
- Faculty: 48
- Teaching staff: 35
- Grades: 9-12
- Student to teacher ratio: 22:1
- Colors: Black, white, gold
- Song: Miami Trace Alma Mater
- Fight song: Go, you Panthers, Go Go Go! Fight on through that line! Go, you Panthers, Go Go Go! Scoring every time! Go, you Panthers, Go Go Go! Victory Black and White! We will fight team fight, we will win tonight so go Trace go!
- Athletics conference: Frontier Athletic Conference
- Sports: Football, Cheerleading, Marching Band, Girls’ Tennis, Girls’ Volleyball, Cross Country, Basketball, Wrestling, Bowling, Swim, Boys’ Tennis, Baseball, Softball, and Track & Field.
- Mascot: Panther
- Team name: Panthers
- Rival: Washington City Schools
- Accreditation: North Central Association of Colleges and Schools
- Newspaper: Panther tales
- Yearbook: MiTra
- Alumni: 11,580
- Website: District Website

Miami Trace High School is a public high school near Washington Court House, Ohio. It is the only high school in the Miami Trace Local School District. Their mascot is the Panthers.

The Miami Trace Local School District serves parts of Washington Court House while also serving the residents in almost every other area in Fayette County as well as small areas in Clinton County near Sabina and Madison County. Miami Trace is a member of the Frontier Athletic Conference (FAC) composed of Chillicothe, Jackson, Hillsboro, Washington City Schools, and McClain.

== History ==
Miami Trace Local Schools was established on July 1, 1955 following the consolidation of eight local school districts in Fayette County. These local schools were formerly Jasper, Concord, Green, Perry, Wayne, Madison, Marion, and Union. On November 25, 1955, Bloomingburg, Paint, and Jefferson local schools were consolidated into the Miami Trace Local School District. On February 10, 1958, New Holland became part of Miami Trace. Since then, Miami Trace’s boundaries have been cemented as the entirety of Fayette County, exclusive of Washington City Schools, and a considerable amount of area from surrounding counties.

== Legacy ==
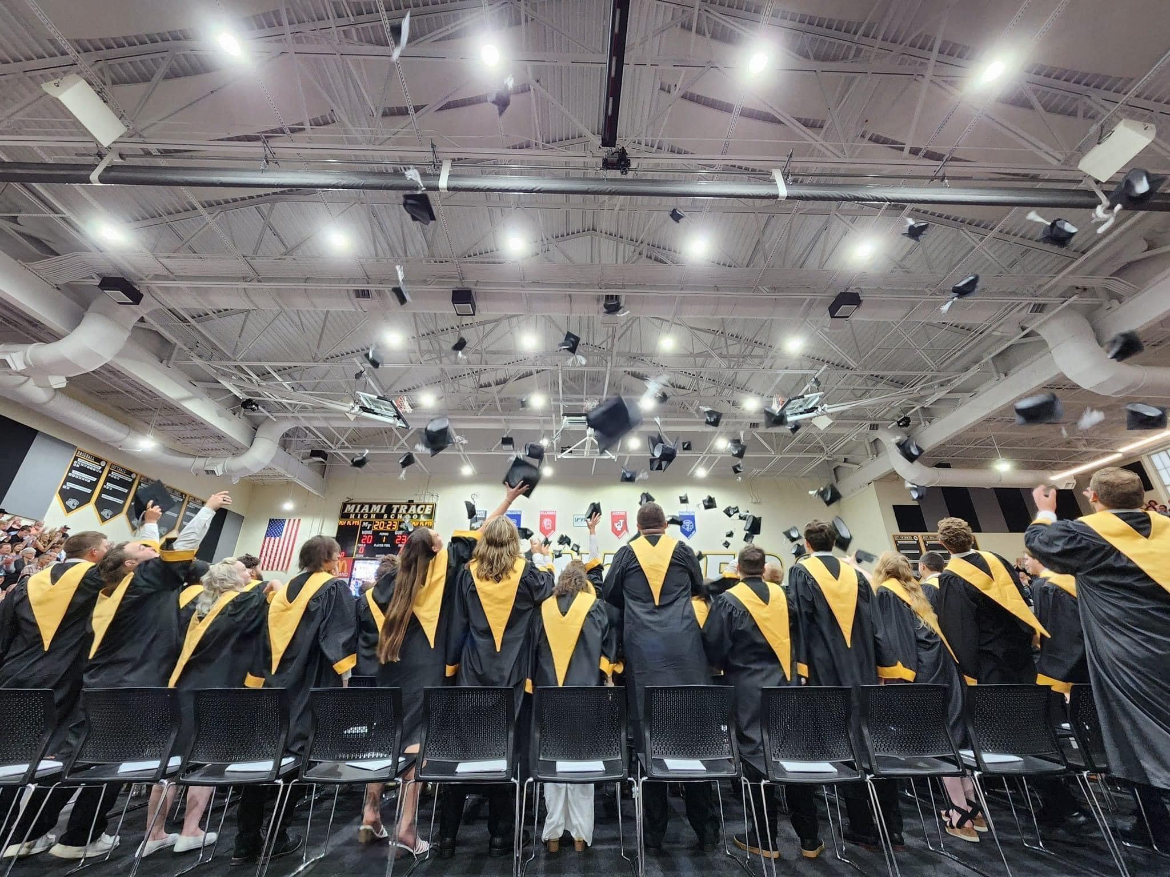
Class of 2023 graduation ceremony.

These formerly independent school districts were consolidated in order to ensure the best education for the rural citizens of Fayette and surrounding counties. Since then, it has become the mission statement of Miami Trace to provide a quality education with opportunities and relationships that cultivate success. According to the records held at the Miami Trace central office, 11,580 students have graduated from Miami Trace, a proven rate of success for its students. Within the 61st graduating class at Miami Trace, the class of 2023, a wide variety of students are attending post-secondary options. Including colleges such as Ohio State University, Ohio University, Miami University, University of Cincinnati, Southern State Community College, and Cornell University. While a number of other students are entering the workforce to immediately begin their careers. Miami Trace has established a vision statement targeted to provide all students with the ability to become successful within society. This vision has been successfully proven and accomplished throughout Miami Trace’s 61 years of operation and instruction.

== Extracurriculars ==
Miami Trace holds strong backgrounds in its sports. Including football, and has built a strong reputation in Girls' Basketball and Wrestling in recent past. Miami Trace has one of the top FFA chapters in Ohio.

Miami Trace additionally provides many clubs and other activities. Including a Key Club, Spanish Club, Drama Club, Art Club, Book Club, Science Club, Robotics Club, Academic Quiz Bowl, National Honor Society, and Student Government.

Additionally, Miami Trace has a growing performing arts program. Miami Trace offers five choirs, including Women’s, Men’s, Advanced Women’s, Symphonic, and Soundsations A Cappella Choirs respectively, 4 bands, including Jazz, Pep, Marching, Concert, and Symphonic Bands respectively. Symphonic Band and Symphonic Choir boast the achievement of receiving superior ratings at the Ohio Music Education Association Large Group Contest. Miami Trace also performs annual musicals and plays.

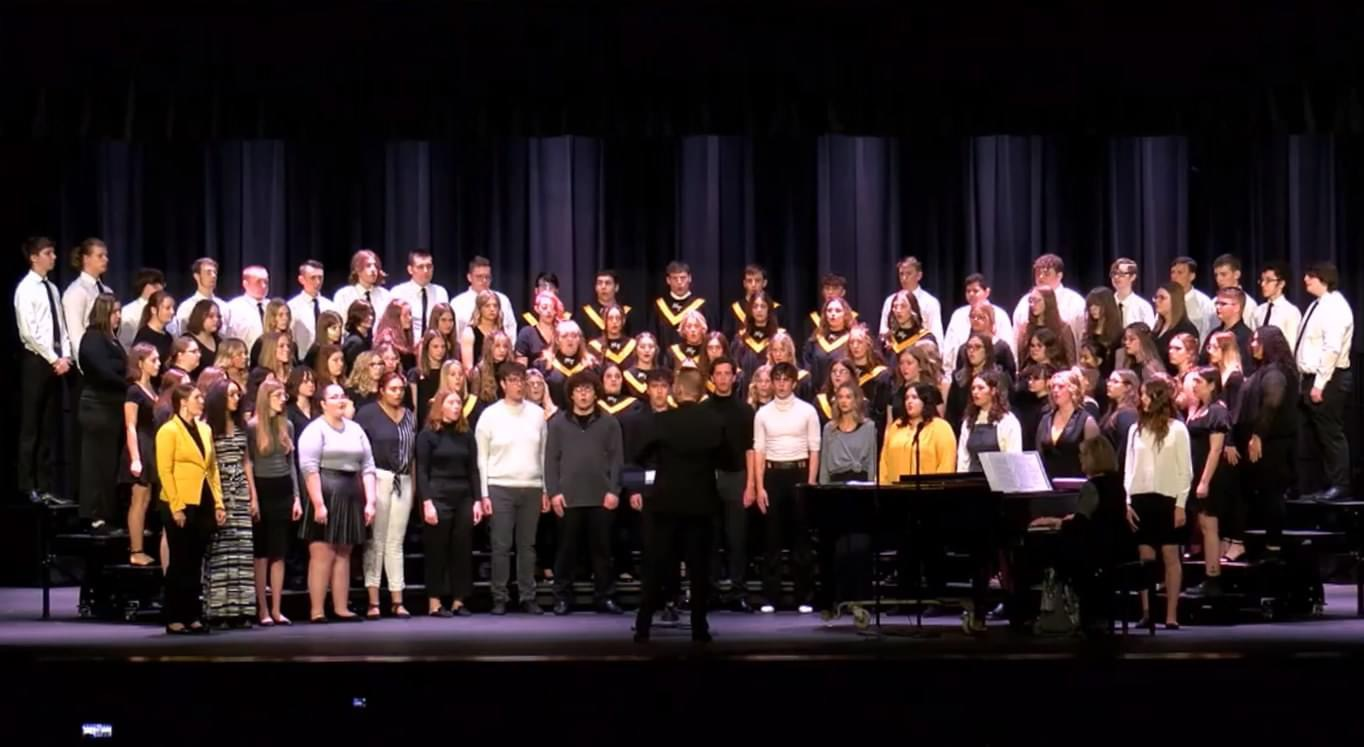
Combined choirs performing Battle Hymn of the Republic at annual Senior Farewell Concert

== New Buildings ==
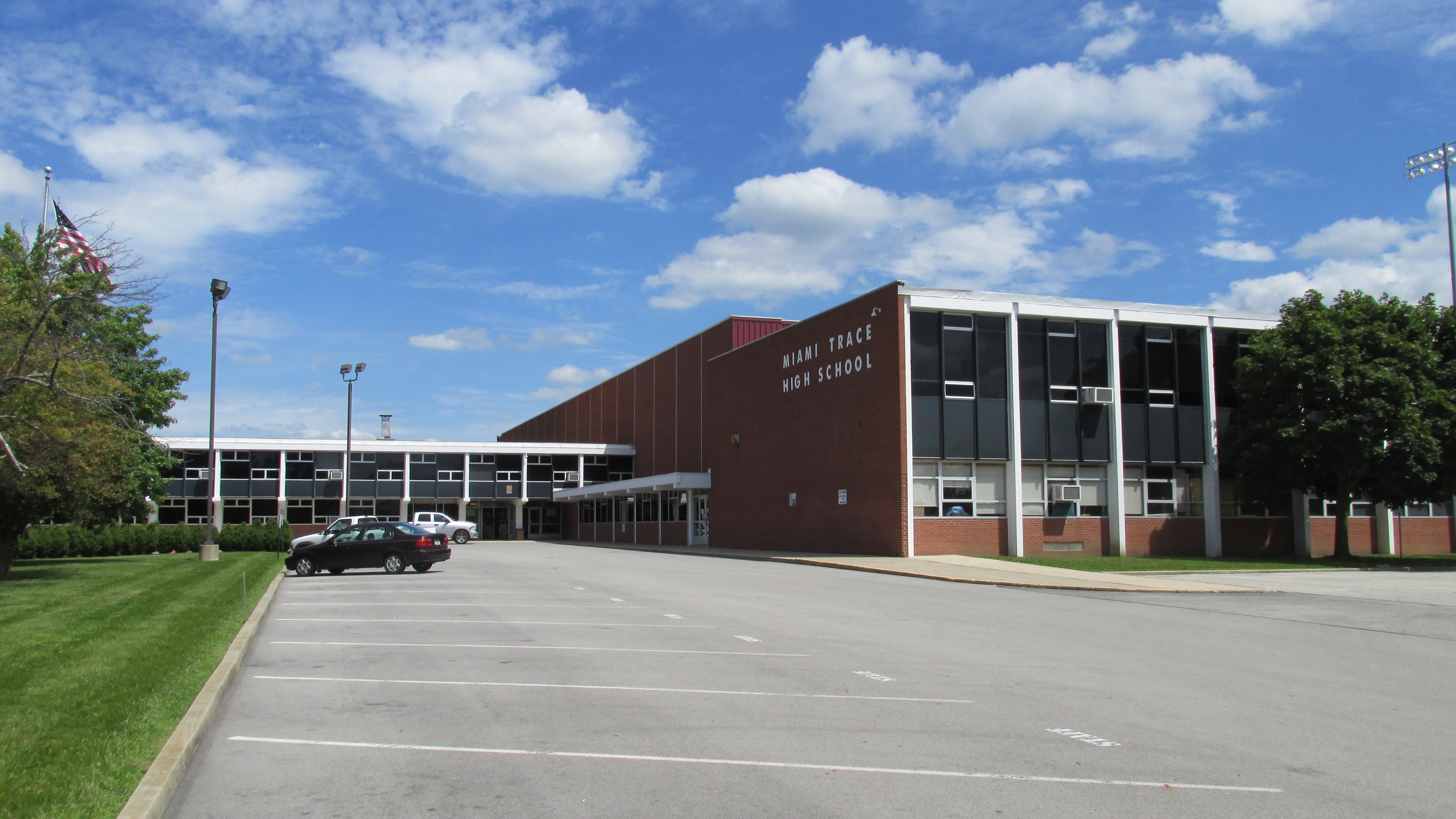
Miami Trace High School, built in 1962 and demolished in 2019.

A new elementary school for Miami Trace opened in 2008 adjacent to the high school along Ohio 41 NW. This building replaced the small, reportedly 100-year-old elementary buildings dotted across the county. Additionally, a new middle school was built in 2011.

Due to growing class sizes and age of the 1960’s high school, a new high school was constructed in 2019.

See also Ohio High School Athletic Association and Ohio High School Athletic Conferences

== Notable alumni ==
- Art Schlichter, Professional American football quarterback
- Glenn Cobb, Two time captain of the Ohio State Buckeyes football team (1981–1982).
- Margaret Peterson Haddix, Award Winning Author

== Alma Mater ==
"Miami Trace Alma Mater" is the school song for Miami Trace High School. It was written in 1962 for the Miami Trace High School Band by Rosemary Williams.

=== Performances ===
The Alma Mater is traditionally performed during pre-game festivities at Friday night football games and other school festivities by the Miami Trace Marching Panther Pride.

Miami Trace's A Capella choir: Soundsations, also performed the song, with their rendition being posted on the school's YouTube page.

Music

*Misconceptions have occurred over the note for "ward" in the last line. The band arrangement has the note marked as an A natural, while the choral version has a C.

The A natural notation has been marked, as it is most commonly heard this way.
