= Ohio State Route 238 =

State highway in Fayette County, Ohio, US

State Route 238

Route information
- Maintained by ODOT
- Length: 1.04 mi (1.67 km)
- Existed: 1924–c. 2015

Major junctions
- South end: US 62 / SR 3 near Washington Court House
- North end: SR 38 in Bloomingburg

Location
- Country: United States
- State: Ohio
- Counties: Fayette

Highway system
- Ohio State Highway System; Interstate; US; State; Scenic
← SR 237	→ SR 239

State Route 238 (SR 238) was a short northwest–southeast state highway in the southwestern portion of Ohio. At just over 1 mile (1.6 km) in length, State Route 238 had its southern terminus at the U.S. Route 62 (US 62)/SR 3 concurrency less than 1 mile (1.6 km) southeast of Bloomingburg. Its northern terminus was at SR 38 in the downtown of the Fayette County village.

Designated in the mid-1920s and located in the northeastern quadrant of Fayette County, SR 238 essentially served as a spur route between the US 62/SR 3 concurrency and SR 38, as the two routes ran generally parallel with one another at a separation of about 1 mile (1.6 km) for a distance of approximately 3.5 miles (5.6 km) between Washington Court House and Bloomingburg. This route provided a connection for the parallel state-maintained roadways at the northeastern end of the run in parallel.

== Route description ==
All of SR 238 was located in the eastern portion of Fayette County. In a 2013 traffic survey, around 2,380 cars traveled on SR 238 on average daily.

The short journey of SR 238 commenced at the rural Union Township intersection of US 62 and SR 3 and Old Springfield Road (CR 137). Heading northwest from there, the two-lane state highway traveled amidst a vastness of farmland, while passing by a couple of homes along the way. After crossing a set of railroad tracks, SR 238 entered Bloomingburg. With the Bloomingburg Cemetery abutting the west side of the highway, SR 238, which is now known as Main Street, passed a business and some residences prior to coming to an end at its junction with SR 38 at a four-way stop intersection in the village's downtown area.

== History ==
SR 238 was designated in 1924 along the routing that it occupied for its entire history near Bloomingburg. The highway did not experience any significant changes between its designation and decommissioning between 2014 and 2015, when it was replaced by a rerouted SR 38.

== Major intersections ==
The entire route is in Fayette County.

Location	mi	km	Destinations	Notes
Union Township	0.000	0.000	US 62 / SR 3 / CR 137 – Washington Court House, Columbus	
Bloomingburg	1.041	1.675	SR 38 (Main Street / Midland Avenue)	
1.000 mi = 1.609 km; 1.000 km = 0.621 mi
