= Rock Mill =

Rock Mill or Rock Mills may refer to

== Locations ==
- Rock Mills, Alabama, United States
- Rock Mills, Alabama, census-designated place in Randolph County, Alabama, United States
- Rock Mills, Ohio, an unincorporated community
- Rock Mills, Virginia, unincorporated community in Rappahannock County, Virginia, United States
- Rock Mills, Ontario, community in Ontario, Canada

== Mills ==
- Rock Mill, Ashton-under-Lyne Lancashire. A cotton mill
- Rock Mill, one of the Historic mills of the Atlanta area, Atlanta, Georgia, United States
- Rock Mill, Washington, West Sussex. A windmill
- The Rock Mill, Rockville, Connecticut, United States
