= Bloomingburg =

Bloomingburg may refer to:

- Bloomingburg, Ohio
- Bloomingburg, New York
