= Manara =

Manara may refer to:

== Places ==
- Manara, Israel, a kibbutz in Upper Gallilee adjacent to the Lebanese border
- Manara, Western Beqaa, a municipality in the Beqaa Governorate, Lebanon, near the Syrian border
- Manara, Beirut, a district of Beirut, Lebanon
- Manara, Nepal
- Manara, Ohio, United States
- Al Manara, Dubai, United Arab Emirates
- Al-Manara, Palestine, a depopulated Palestinian village near Tiberias

== Buildings ==
- Al Manara Stadium, a stadium in Manara, Beirut
- Al Manara Tower, a tower on Sheikh Zayed Road in Dubai, United Arab Emirates
- Al Manara (tower), a tower in Business Bay in Dubai, United Arab Emirates

== Other uses ==
- Manara (Nord) River - a river in Northern Madagascar.
- Manara (film), a 2018 Lebanese short film
- 5092 Manara, a main belt asteroid named after Alessandro Manara
- Il commissario Manara, an Italian television crime series
- Minaret, known as manara (منارة, but more usually مئذنة) in Arabic
- Cruise Ship MS Manara

== People with the surname Manara ==
- Achille Manara (1827–1906), Italian cardinal
- Luciano Manara (1825–1849), Italian soldier
- Milo Manara (born 1945), Italian comic book creator
- Miguel Mañara Vicentelo de Leca (1627–1679), Spanish Jesuit brother who helped build Santa Caridad de Sevilla Hospital

== See also ==
- Mananara River (Analanjirofo), a river in Northern Madagascar
