= Hagler =

Hagler is a surname. Notable people with the surname include:

== People with surname or given name ==
- Lyle Hagler Boren (1909–1992), American politician
- Collins Hagler (born 1935), Canadian football player
- Ellis Hagler (1908–1990), American football player and coach
- King Hagler (c. 1700 – 1763), leader of the Catawba Indian Nation
- Louise Hagler, author of The Farm Vegetarian Cookbook
- Marvin Hagler (1954–2021), American boxer
- Sherry Hagler, keyboardist for Birtha
- Steve Hagler, guitarist for Starcastle
- Tyjuan Hagler (born 1981), American football linebacker

== Places ==
- Hagler, Ohio
- Hagler-Cole Cabin
- Hagler Field, previous name for Pensacola International Airport
- William Hagler House

== Other ==
- Freddie Norwood (born 1970), boxer known as "Lil Hagler"
- Waldman-Hagler rules, a combining rule

Media related to Hagler (surname) at Wikimedia Commons
