= Boyds, Ohio =

Community in Fayette County, Ohio, US

- Unincorporated community
- Location within Ohio
- Coordinates: 39°29′42″N 83°23′00″W
- Country: United States
- State: Ohio
- Counties: Fayette
- Elevation: 951 ft (290 m)
- Time zone: UTC-5 (Eastern (EST))
  - Summer (DST): UTC-4 (EDT)
- ZIP code: 43160
- Area code: 740
- GNIS feature ID: 1062405

Boyds (previously also known as Boyd) is an unincorporated community in Union Township, Fayette County, Ohio, United States. It is located southeast of Washington Court House along Bogus Road SE (County Road 138) near its intersection with Ohio State Route 753.
