= Madison Mills =

Madison Mills is the name of multiple populated places:

- Madison Mills, Ohio
- Madison Mills, Virginia
