= Cook, Ohio =

Community in Fayette County, Ohio, US

- Unincorporated community
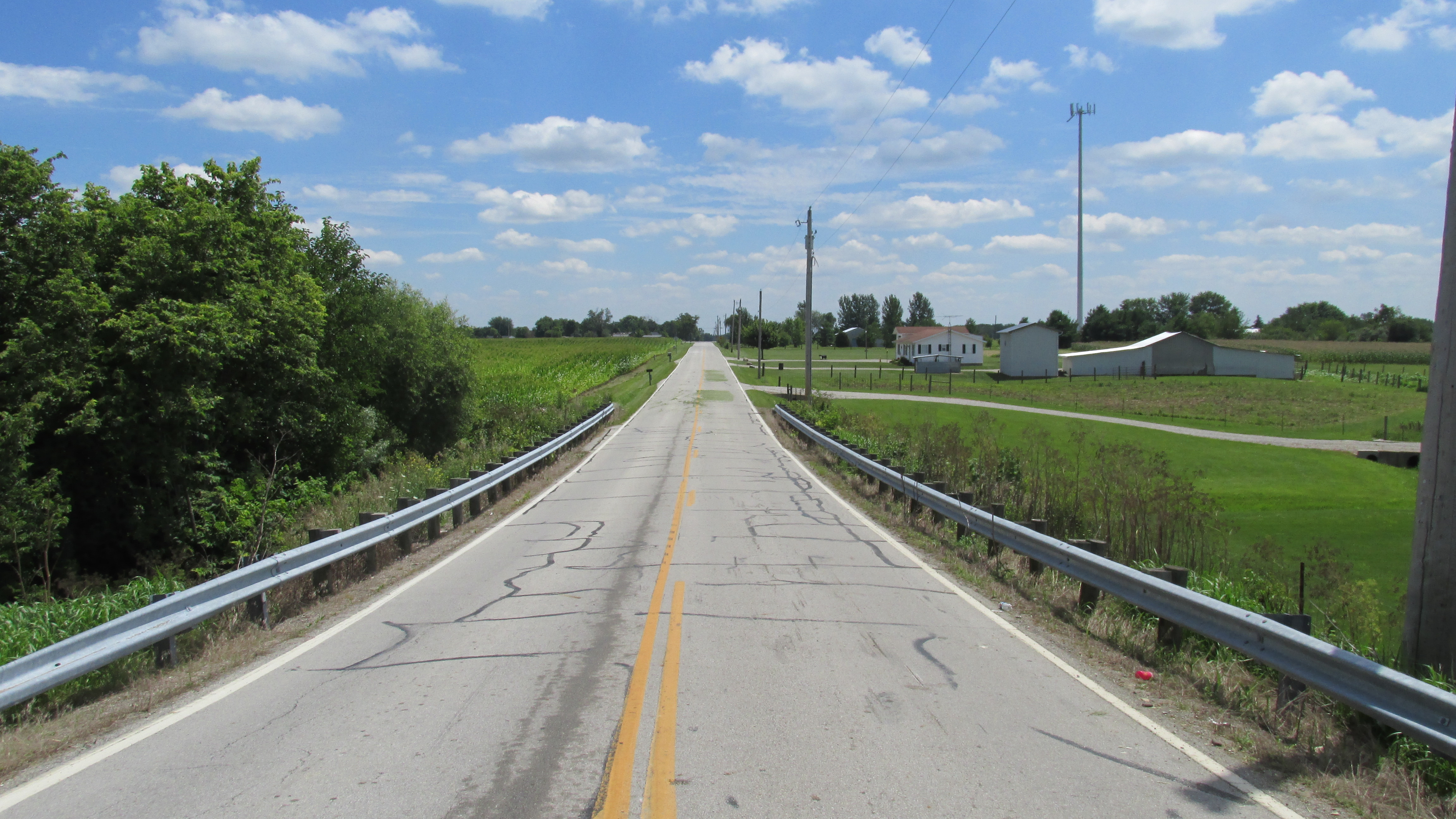
- Looking east on Cook-Yankeetown Road towards US Highway 62 in Cook, Ohio

- Location within Ohio Location within the United States
- Coordinates: 39°40′59″N 83°18′26″W
- Country: United States
- State: Ohio
- Counties: Fayette
- Township: Madison
- Elevation: 912 ft (278 m)
- Time zone: UTC-5 (Eastern (EST))
  - Summer (DST): UTC-4 (EDT)
- ZIP code: 43143
- Area code: 740
- GNIS feature ID: 1070722

Cook is an unincorporated community in Madison Township, Fayette County, Ohio, United States. It is located along Cook-Yankeetown Road (Fayette County Highway 34), just west of its intersection with U.S. Route 62/State Route 3.

The community is named after Matthew S. Cook, the original owner of the town site, who gave the right of way to the Baltimore and Ohio Railroad. The Cook Post Office was established on January 20, 1885, but closed on March 31, 1933. The mail service is now sent through the Mount Sterling branch.
