= Ghormley, Ohio =

Community in Fayette County, Ohio, US

- Unincorporated community
- Location within Ohio
- Coordinates: 39°24′34″N 83°22′44″W
- Country: United States
- State: Ohio
- Counties: Fayette
- Elevation: 883 ft (269 m)
- Time zone: UTC-5 (Eastern (EST))
  - Summer (DST): UTC-4 (EDT)
- ZIP code: 43160
- Area code: 740
- GNIS feature ID: 1068740

Ghormley is an unincorporated community in Paint Township, Fayette County, Ohio, United States.
