= McLean, Nebraska =

Village in Pierce County, Nebraska, United States

- Village
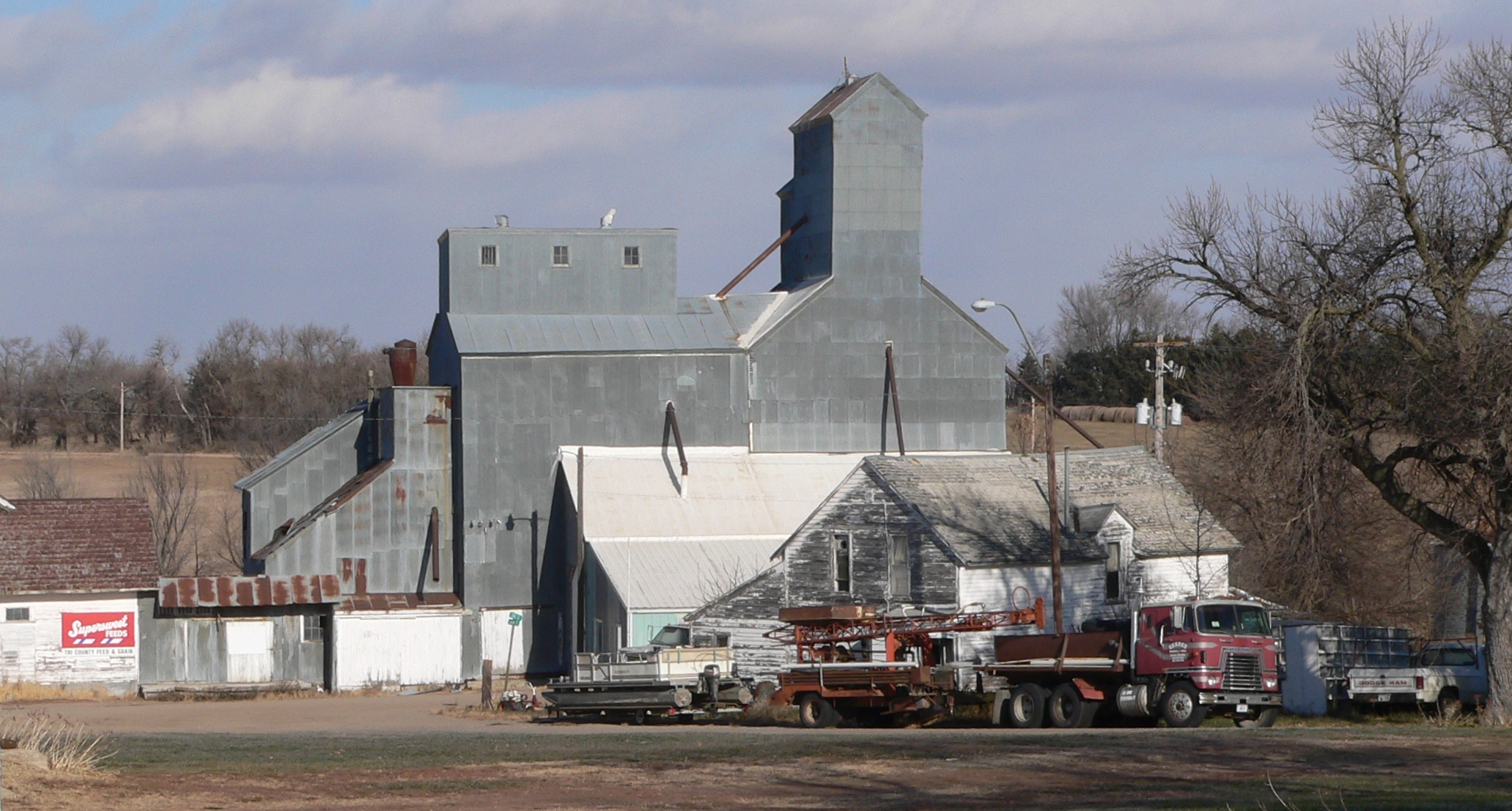
- Main Street in McLean, November 2010

- Location of McLean, Nebraska
- Coordinates: 42°23′11″N 97°28′05″W
- Country: United States
- State: Nebraska
- County: Pierce

Area
  - Total: 0.097 sq mi (0.25 km^{2})
  - Land: 0.097 sq mi (0.25 km^{2})
  - Water: 0 sq mi (0.00 km^{2})
- Elevation: 1,837 ft (560 m)

Population (2020)
  - Total: 33
  - Density: 348.5/sq mi (134.54/km^{2})
- Time zone: UTC-6 (Central (CST))
  - Summer (DST): UTC-5 (CDT)
- ZIP code: 68747
- Area code: 402
- FIPS code: 31-30065
- GNIS feature ID: 2399297

McLean is a village in Pierce County, Nebraska, United States. It is part of the Norfolk, Nebraska Micropolitan Statistical Area. As of the 2020 census, McLean had a population of 33.

== History ==
McLean got its start following construction of the Chicago, Burlington and Quincy Railroad through the territory. Some people say it was named for Donald McLean, a railroad employee, while others believe it was named after McLean, Ohio.

The McLean post office was established in 1900.

== Geography ==
According to the United States Census Bureau, the village has a total area of 0.10 square miles (0.26 km^{2}), all land.

== Demographics ==
Historical population
Census	Pop.	Note	%±
1920	81		—
1930	96		18.5%
1940	82		−14.6%
1950	67		−18.3%
1960	73		9.0%
1970	67		−8.2%
1980	46		−31.3%
1990	49		6.5%
2000	38		−22.4%
2010	36		−5.3%
2020	33		−8.3%
U.S. Decennial Census

=== 2010 census ===
As of the census of 2010, there were 36 people, 18 households, and 9 families residing in the village. The population density was 360.0 inhabitants per square mile (139.0/km^{2}). There were 25 housing units at an average density of 250.0 per square mile (96.5/km^{2}). The racial makeup of the village was 100.0% White.

There were 18 households, of which 22.2% had children under the age of 18 living with them, 50.0% were married couples living together, and 50.0% were non-families. 44.4% of all households were made up of individuals, and 27.8% had someone living alone who was 65 years of age or older. The average household size was 2.00 and the average family size was 2.89.

The median age in the village was 44.5 years. 22.2% of residents were under the age of 18; 0.1% were between the ages of 18 and 24; 27.8% were from 25 to 44; 30.5% were from 45 to 64; and 19.4% were 65 years of age or older. The gender makeup of the village was 47.2% male and 52.8% female.

=== 2000 census ===
As of the census of 2000, there were 38 people, 18 households, and 9 families residing in the village. The population density was 400.9 inhabitants per square mile (154.8/km^{2}). There were 26 housing units at an average density of 274.3 per square mile (105.9/km^{2}). The racial makeup of the village was 100.00% White.

There were 18 households, out of which 33.3% had children under the age of 18 living with them, 44.4% were married couples living together, and 50.0% were non-families. 50.0% of all households were made up of individuals, and 22.2% had someone living alone who was 65 years of age or older. The average household size was 2.11 and the average family size was 3.22.

In the village, the population was spread out, with 26.3% under the age of 18, 7.9% from 18 to 24, 26.3% from 25 to 44, 15.8% from 45 to 64, and 23.7% who were 65 years of age or older. The median age was 40 years. For every 100 females, there were 111.1 males. For every 100 females age 18 and over, there were 100.0 males.

As of 2000 the median income for a household in the village was $27,292, and the median income for a family was $45,417. Males had a median income of $26,750 versus $28,750 for females. The per capita income for the village was $17,225. None of the population and none of the families were below the poverty line.

== See also ==
- List of municipalities in Nebraska
