= Madison Mills, Ohio =

Community in Fayette County, Ohio, US

- Unincorporated community
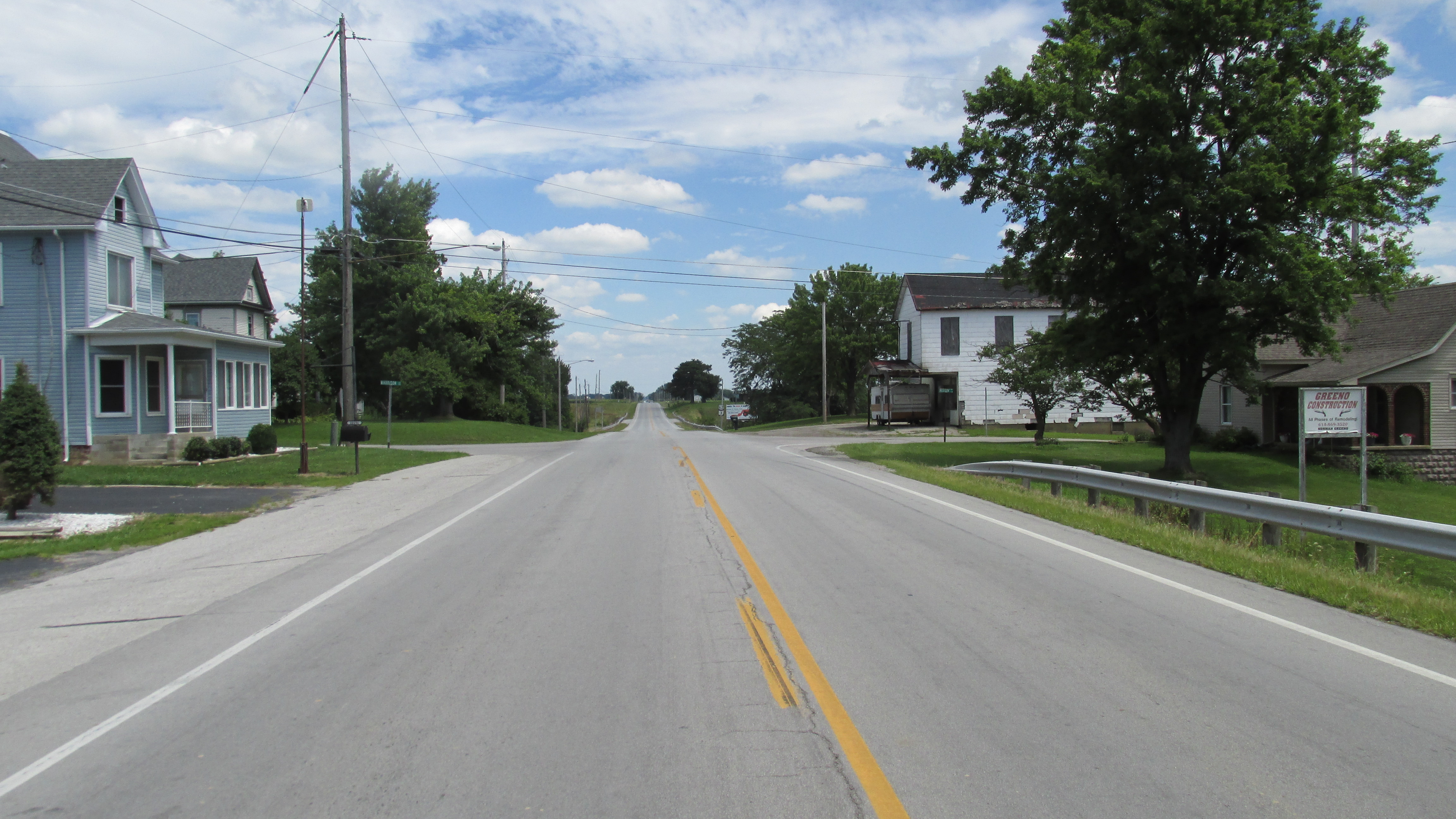
- Looking north on U.S. Route 62 in Madison Mills

- Location within Ohio Location within the United States
- Coordinates: 39°39′13″N 83°20′23″W
- Country: United States
- State: Ohio
- Counties: Fayette
- Township: Madison
- Elevation: 925 ft (282 m)
- Time zone: UTC-5 (Eastern (EST))
  - Summer (DST): UTC-4 (EDT)
- ZIP code: 43143
- Area code: 740
- GNIS feature ID: 1070830

Madison Mills is an unincorporated community in Madison Township, Fayette County, Ohio, United States. It is located along Harrison Road (Fayette County Highway 32), between Bloomingburg and Mount Sterling.

== History ==
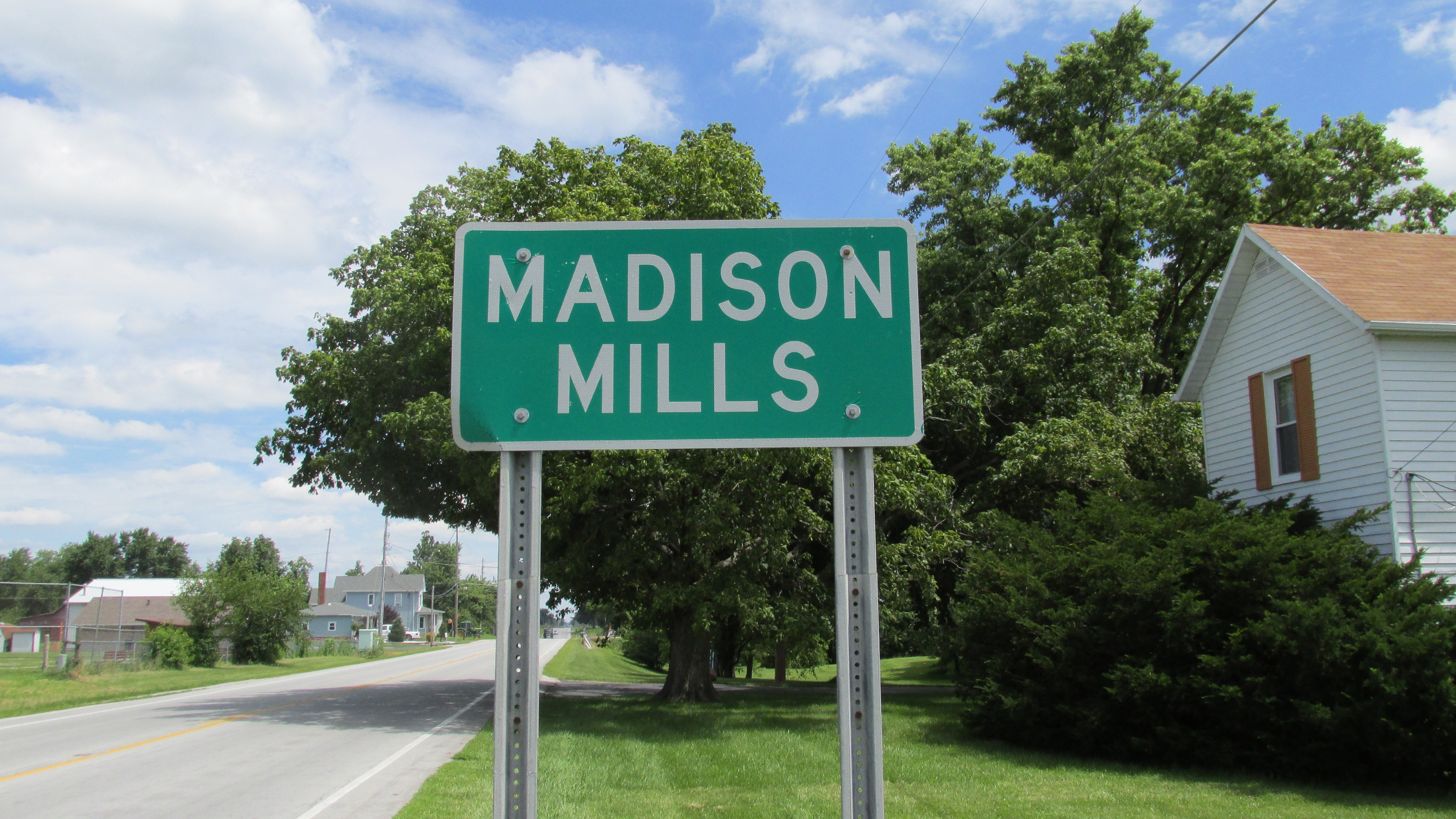
Madison Mills community sign

A large gristmill called Madison Mills was built at the site in 1859. The Madison Mills Post Office was established on December 12, 1866, but was discontinued on May 31, 1942. The mail service is now sent through the Mount Sterling branch.
