= Blessing, Ohio =

Community in Fayette County, Ohio, US

- Unincorporated community
- Location within Ohio
- Coordinates: 39°42′09″N 83°36′13″W
- Country: United States
- State: Ohio
- Counties: Fayette
- Elevation: 1,109 ft (338 m)
- Time zone: UTC-5 (Eastern (EST))
  - Summer (DST): UTC-4 (EDT)
- ZIP code: 43128
- Area code: 740
- GNIS feature ID: 1064448

Blessing is an unincorporated community in Jefferson Township, Fayette County, Ohio, United States.

As of 1914, Blessing was described as "a mere hamlet", with no population recorded.
