= Yankeetown, Fayette County, Ohio =

Community in Fayette County, Ohio, US

Yankeetown, Ohio
- Unincorporated community
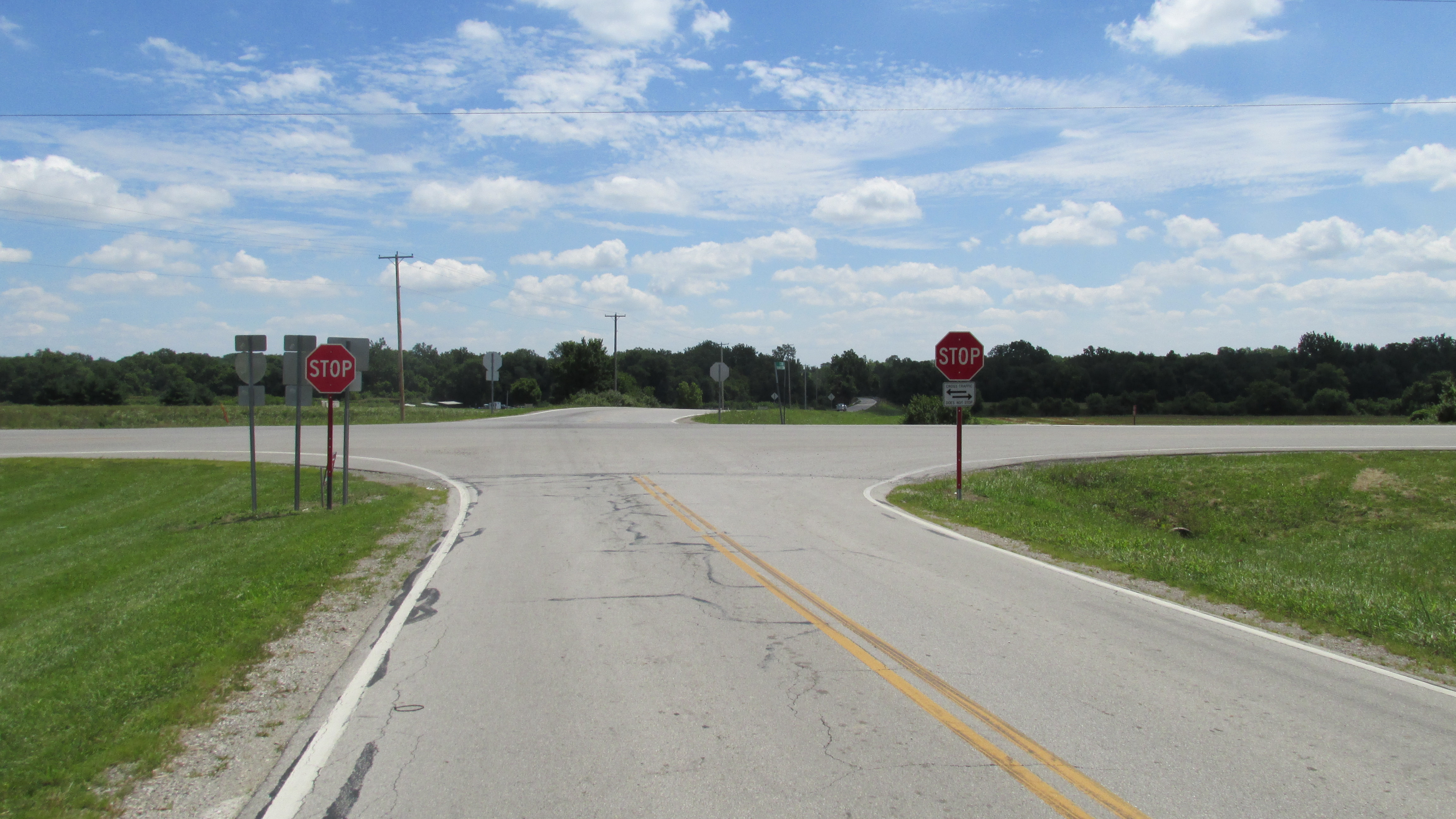
- Looking east at intersection of Ohio State Route 207 and Cook-Yankeetown Road

- Location within Ohio Location within the United States
- Coordinates: 39°39′41″N 83°16′06″W
- Country: United States
- State: Ohio
- Counties: Fayette
- Township: Madison
- Elevation: 850 ft (260 m)
- Time zone: UTC-5 (Eastern (EST))
  - Summer (DST): UTC-4 (EDT)
- ZIP code: 43143
- Area code: 740
- GNIS feature ID: 1063105

Yankeetown is an unincorporated community in Madison Township, Fayette County, Ohio, United States. It is located at the intersection of State Route 207 and Cook-Yankeetown Road (Fayette County Highway 34), about 3 miles south of Mount Sterling.
