= New Martinsburg, Ohio =

Unincorporated community in Ohio, U.S.

Coordinates: 39°23′48″N 83°27′50″W

New Martinsburg is an unincorporated community in Fayette County, in the U.S. state of Ohio.

== History ==
New Martinsburg was originally called Martinsburg until 1831. The community derives its name from Martinsburg, West Virginia, the native home of a share of the first settlers. A post office was established at New Martinsburg in 1831, and remained in operation until 1906.
