= Cunningham, Ohio =

Unincorporated community in Ohio, U.S.

Coordinates: 39°34′42″N 83°33′05″W

Cunningham is an unincorporated community in Fayette County, in the U.S. state of Ohio.

== History ==
Cunningham was a station on the Cincinnati, Hamilton and Dayton Railroad.
