= White Oak, Fayette County, Ohio =

Unincorporated community in Ohio, U.S.

Coordinates: 39°41′20″N 83°20′40″W

White Oak is an unincorporated community in Fayette County, in the U.S. state of Ohio.

== History ==
A post office called White Oak was established in 1857, and remained in operation until 1864. White Oak once had its own schoolhouse.
