= South Plymouth, Ohio =

Unincorporated community in Ohio, U.S.

Coordinates: 39°34′48″N 83°35′12″W

South Plymouth is an unincorporated community in Fayette County, in the U.S. state of Ohio.

== History ==
A post office was established at South Plymouth in 1852, and remained in operation until 1877.
