= Georgetown, Fayette County, Ohio =

Community in Fayette County, Ohio, US

Georgetown, Ohio
- Unincorporated community
- Location within Ohio
- Coordinates: 39°26′17″N 83°30′33″W
- Country: United States
- State: Ohio
- Counties: Fayette
- Elevation: 1,011 ft (308 m)
- Time zone: UTC-5 (Eastern (EST))
  - Summer (DST): UTC-4 (EDT)
- ZIP code: 43160
- Area code: 740
- GNIS feature ID: 1062780

Georgetown is an unincorporated community in Green Township, Fayette County, Ohio, United States. It is located southwest of Washington Court House.
