= Buena Vista, Fayette County, Ohio =

Community in Fayette County, Ohio, US

Buena Vista, Ohio
- Unincorporated community
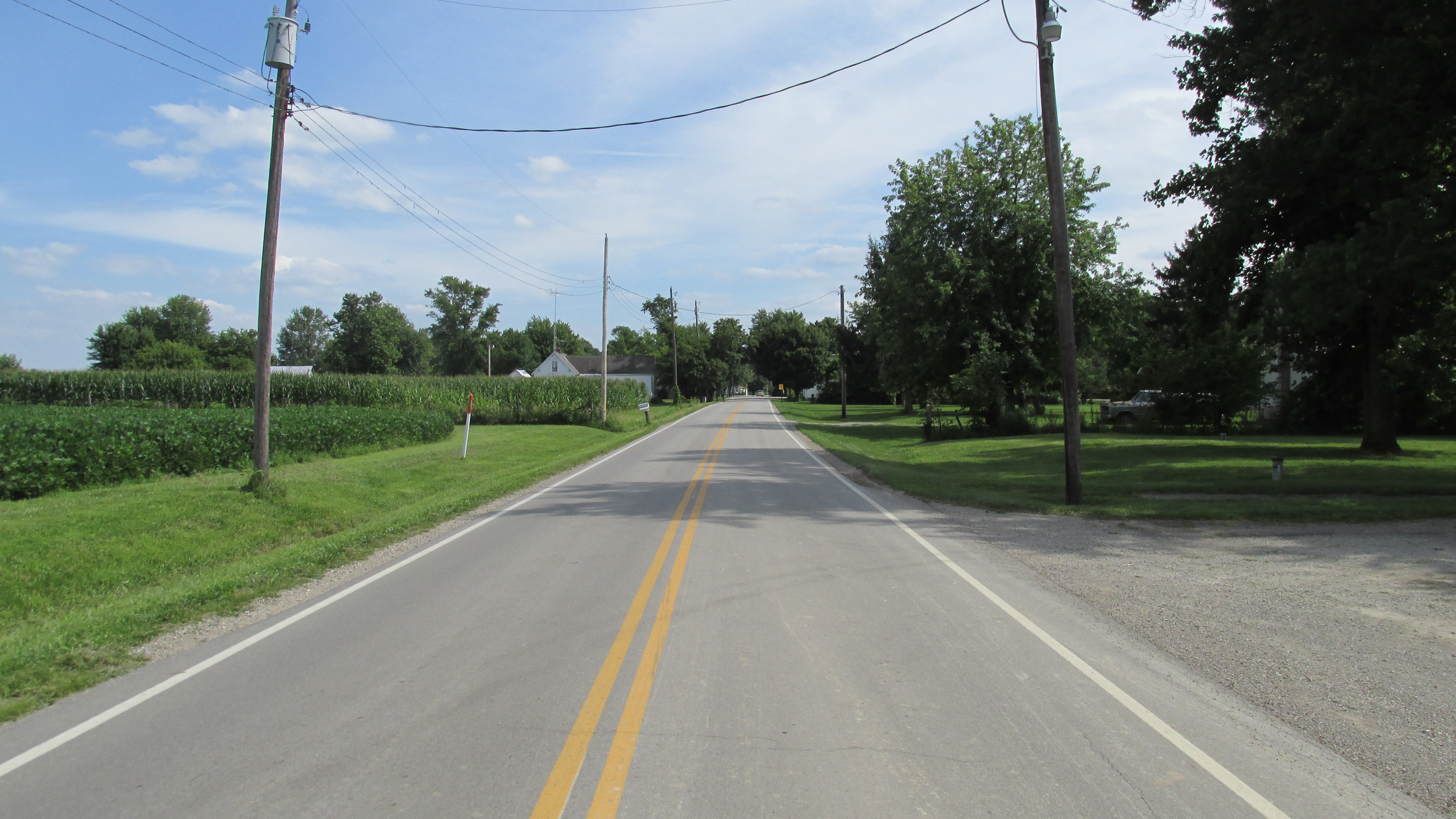
- Looking south on Stafford Road in Buena Vista

- Location within Ohio Location within the United States
- Coordinates: 39°25′19″N 83°29′39″W
- Country: United States
- State: Ohio
- Counties: Fayette
- Township: Green
- Elevation: 1,014 ft (309 m)
- Time zone: UTC-5 (Eastern (EST))
  - Summer (DST): UTC-4 (EDT)
- ZIP code: 43160
- Area code: 740
- GNIS feature ID: 1056737

Buena Vista is an unincorporated community in Green Township, Fayette County, Ohio, United States. It is located at the intersection of Greenfield-Sabina Road (Fayette County Highway 5) and Stafford Road (Fayette County Highway 3), about 5 miles (8.0 km) south of Washington Court House. Rattlesnake Creek flows near the town site.

== History ==
Buena Vista had its start in the 1830s. Buena Vista was formerly called Moons, after William Moon, an early settler. The present name is said to be a transfer from Buena Vista, Virginia.

A post office called Moon was established in 1833, and remained in operation until 1907.

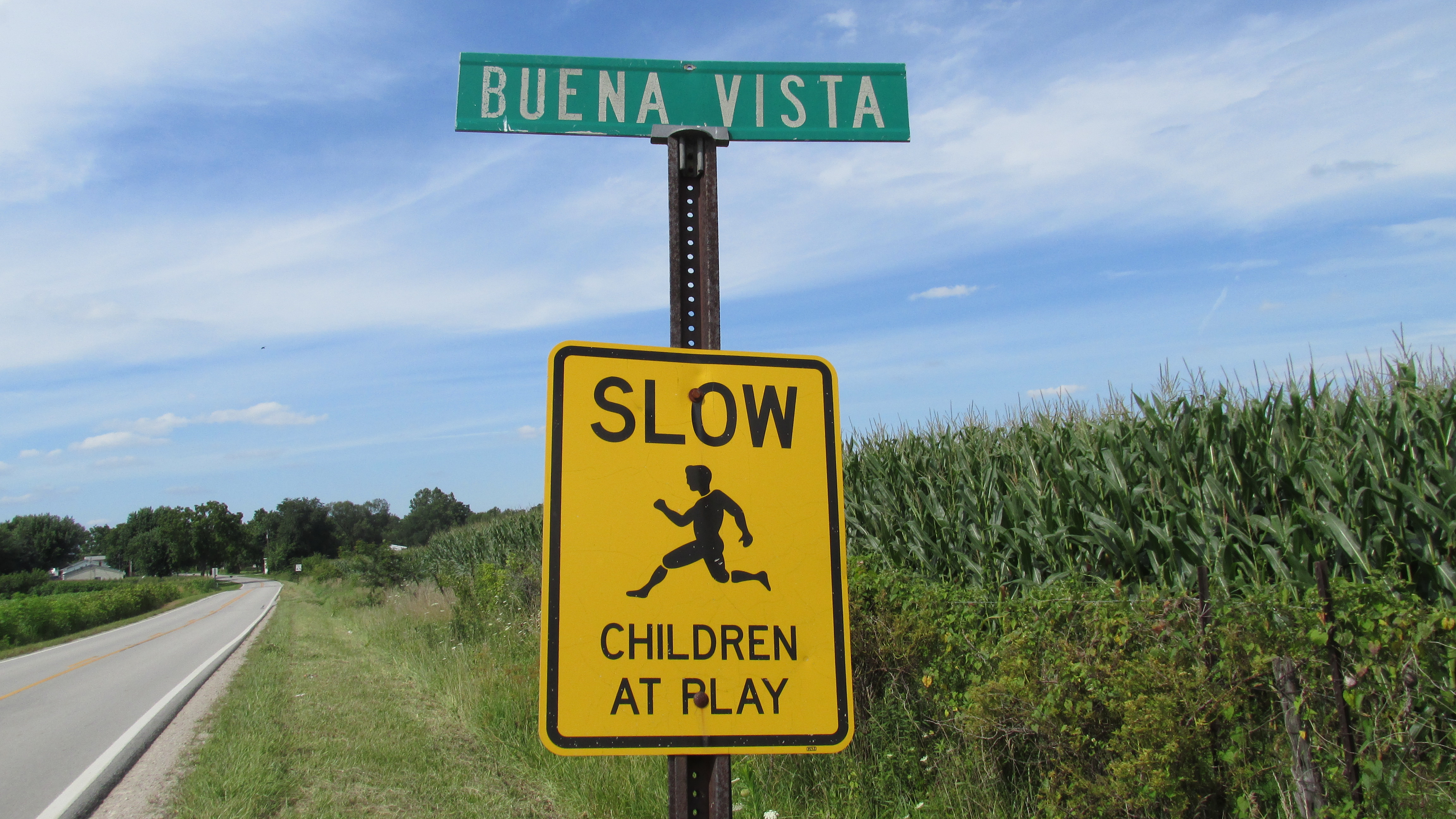
Buena Vista community sign
