= West Lancaster, Ohio =

Unincorporated community in Ohio, U.S.

Coordinates: 39°37′22″N 83°36′35″W

West Lancaster is an unincorporated community in Fayette County, Ohio, United States.

== History ==
West Lancaster was founded c. 1850. A post office called West Lancaster was established in 1852, and remained in operation until 1906. West Lancaster had 142 inhabitants in 1914.
