= Staunton, Ohio =

Unincorporated community in Ohio, U.S.

Coordinates: 39°28′31″N 83°29′00″W

Staunton is an unincorporated community in Fayette County, in the U.S. state of Ohio.

== History ==
Staunton was platted in 1848. The community was named after Staunton, Virginia, the native home of a share of the first settlers. A post office was established at Staunton in 1844, and remained in operation until 1903.
