= Bookwalter, Ohio =

Community in Fayette County, Ohio, US

- Unincorporated community
- Location within Ohio
- Coordinates: 39°42′16″N 83°31′49″W
- Country: United States
- State: Ohio
- Counties: Fayette
- Elevation: 1,060 ft (320 m)
- Time zone: UTC-5 (Eastern (EST))
  - Summer (DST): UTC-4 (EDT)
- ZIP code: 43128
- Area code: 740
- GNIS feature ID: 1070687

Bookwalter is an unincorporated community in Paint Township, Fayette County, Ohio, United States.

The Bookwalter Post Office was established on November 28, 1881, which closed on July 14, 1904. The mail service is now sent through the Jeffersonville branch.
