= Plano, Ohio =

Unincorporated community in Ohio, U.S.

- unincorporated community
- Interactive map of Plano, Ohio
- Coordinates: 39°29′27″N 83°17′12″W
- Country: United States
- State: Ohio
- Counties: Fayette and Ross
- Post office established: 1892 (Ross County side)
- Named for: Variant name: Dogtown
- Time zone: UTC−5 (Eastern (EST))
  - Summer (DST): UTC−4 (EDT)

Plano is an unincorporated community in Fayette and Ross counties, in the U.S. state of Ohio.

== History ==
An early variant name was Dogtown. A post office was established at Plano on the Ross County side in 1892, where it remained in operation until 1903.
