= Glendon, Ohio =

Unincorporated community in Ohio, U.S.

Coordinates: 39°30′30″N 83°33′03″W

Glendon is an unincorporated community in Fayette County, in the U.S. state of Ohio.

== History ==
An early variant name was Rattlesnake. A post office called Rattlesnake was established in 1889, and remained in operation until 1904. Glendon (or Glenden) had 25 inhabitants in 1910.
