= Johnson, Ohio =

Unincorporated community in Ohio, U.S.

Coordinates: 39°32′50″N 83°19′50″W

Johnson is an unincorporated community in Fayette County, in the U.S. state of Ohio.

== History ==
An early variant name was Johnsons Crossing. The community was named for John Johnson, Sr., the original owner of the site. A general store was operated at the crossing.
