= Pleasant View, Ohio =

Unincorporated community in Ohio, U.S.

Coordinates: 39°39′54″N 83°38′00″W

Pleasant View is an unincorporated community in Fayette County, in the U.S. state of Ohio.

== History ==
Pleasant View had its start around 1875 when James Flax opened a country store there.
