= Luttrell, Ohio =

Unincorporated community in Ohio, U.S.

Coordinates: 39°35′05″N 83°38′59″W

Luttrell is an unincorporated community in Fayette County, in the U.S. state of Ohio.

== History ==
A post office was established at Luttrell in 1900, and remained in operation until 1903. Luttell once had its own school.
