= Parrott, Ohio =

Unincorporated community in Ohio, U.S.

Coordinates: 39°36′51″N 83°31′54″W

Parrott is an unincorporated community in Fayette County, in the U.S. state of Ohio.

== History ==
A post office called Parrott was established in 1881, and remained in operation until 1931. The community has the name of one George Parrott. Parrott had 50 inhabitants in 1910.
