= Eber, Ohio =

Unincorporated community in Ohio, U.S.

Coordinates: 39°34′22″N 83°28′17″W

Eber is an unincorporated community in Fayette County, in the U.S. state of Ohio.

== History ==
A post office was established at Eber in 1892, and remained in operation until 1902. The community took its name from the local Mt. Eber Sunday School.
