= Yatesville, Ohio =

Unincorporated community in Ohio, U.S.

Coordinates: 39°40′40″N 83°26′58″W

Yatesville is an unincorporated community in Fayette County, in the U.S. state of Ohio.

== History ==
The community was named after M. L. Yates, founder. A post office called Yatesville was established in 1888, and remained in operation until 1905. Yatesville had 27 inhabitants in 1910.
