= Edgefield, Ohio =

Unincorporated community in Ohio, U.S.

Coordinates: 39°36′51″N 83°38′41″W

Edgefield is an unincorporated community in Fayette County, in the U.S. state of Ohio.

== History ==
Edgefield derives its name from Obadiah Edge, landowner of the town site. A post office called Edgefield was established in 1877, and remained in operation until 1914. Edgefield had 46 inhabitants in 1910.
