= Fairview, Fayette County, Ohio =

Unincorporated community in Ohio, U.S.

Coordinates: 39°28′47″N 83°18′19″W

Fairview is an unincorporated community in Fayette County, in the U.S. state of Ohio.

== History ==
Fairview was laid out on a farm. It became a railroad station and local shipping point of grain.
