= Jasper Mills, Ohio =

Unincorporated community in Ohio, U.S.

Coordinates: 39°31′07″N 83°31′14″W

Jasper Mills is an unincorporated community in Jasper Township, Fayette County, Ohio, United States. It is located along U.S. Route 22, three miles west of Washington Court House.

Jasper Mills is depicted on the Milledgeville U.S. Geological Survey Map and falls within the Eastern Time Zone (UTC -5 hours). The satellite coordinates for Jasper Mills are 39°31'6"N latitude and 83°31'17"W longitude. The community is surrounded by 464 places including cities, towns, and hamlets within a 100-kilometer or 62-mile radius, with Washington Court House being the nearest place in the area.

== History ==
Jasper Mills had its start around 1854 when the railroad was extended to that point. The community was named for a gristmill which operated there, and for Jasper Township, the township in which it is located. A post office called Jasper Mills was established at Jasper Mills in 1857, and remained in operation until 1876.

== Climate ==
Regarding the climate, the Port Columbus International Airport, which is 47 miles from Jasper Mills, provides a reference for the area's weather. However, there can be slight variations in the actual climate of Jasper Mills. The climate information is based on weather reports collected from 1985 to 2015.

== Gallery ==
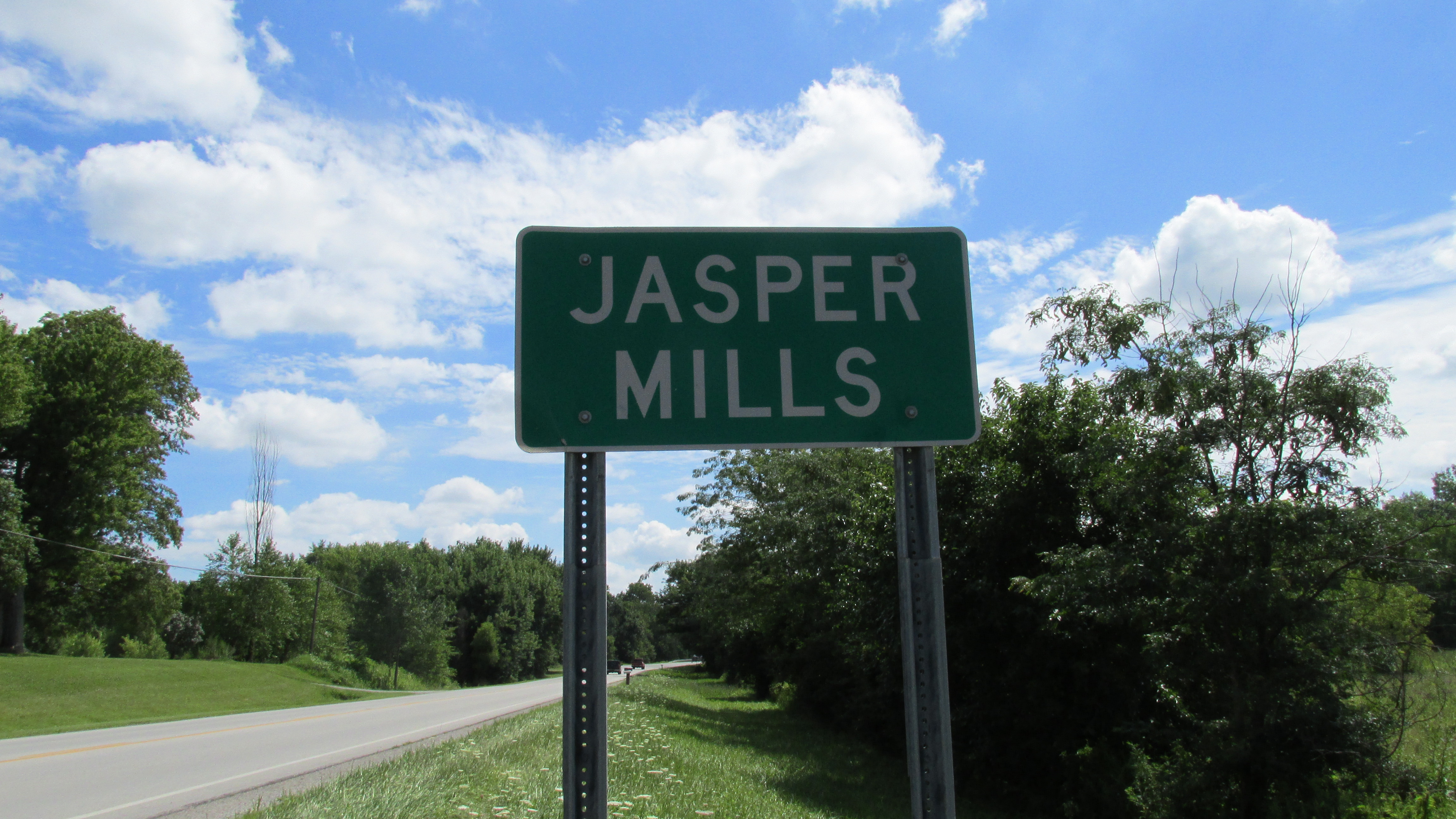
Jasper Mills community sign

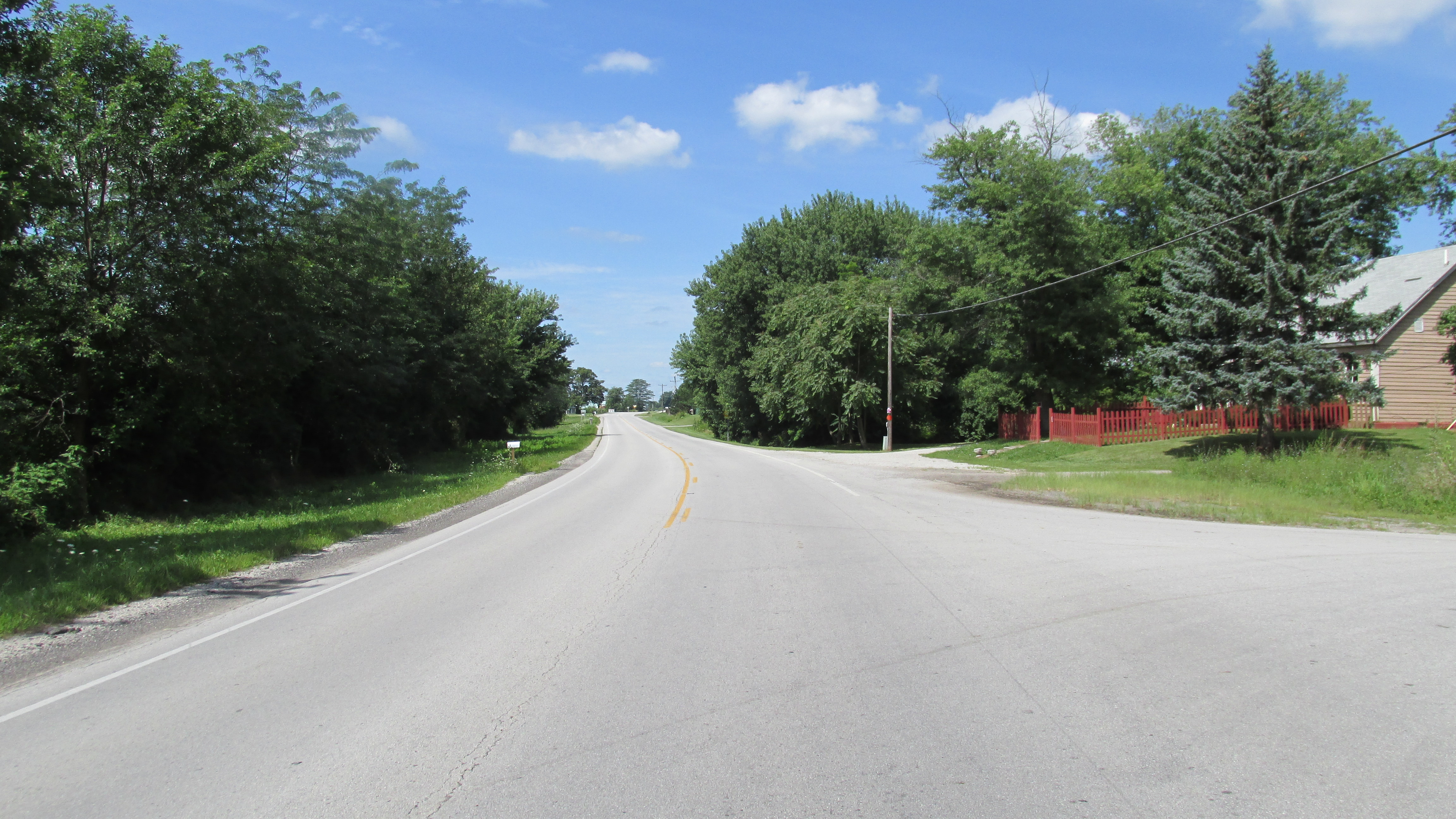
Looking west on U.S. Route 22 in Jasper Mills
