= Marion Township, Fayette County, Ohio =

Township in Ohio, US

- Township
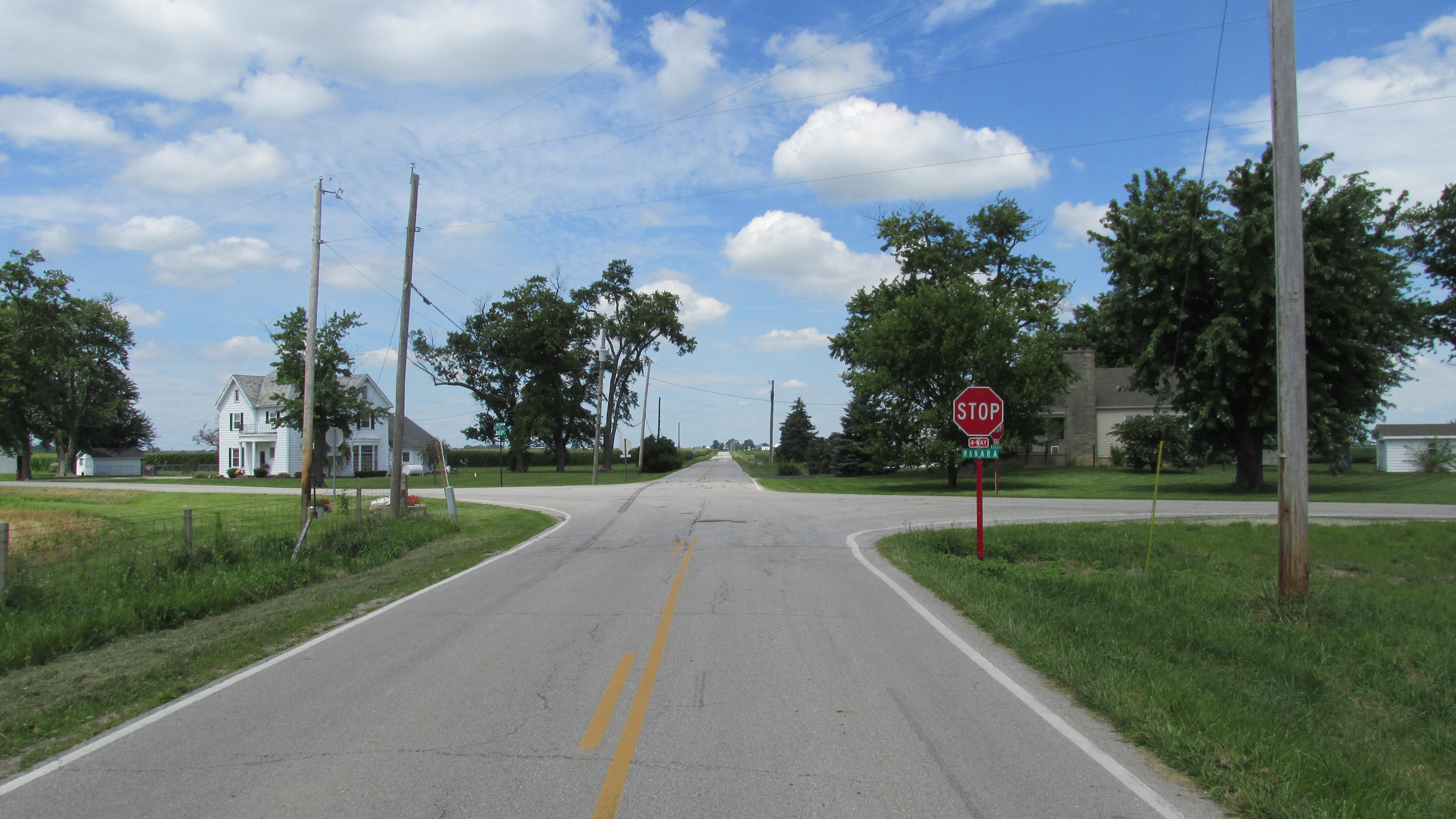
- Intersection at Manara

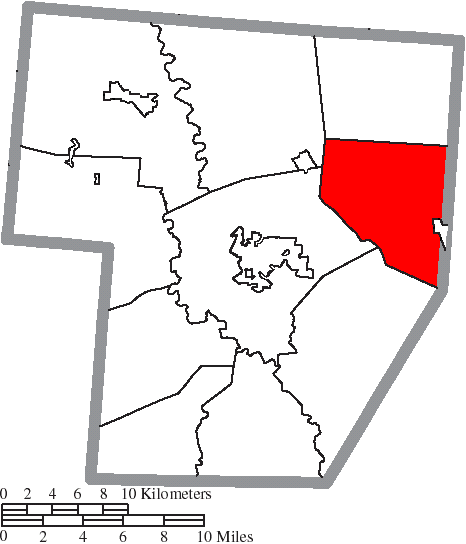
- Location of Marion Township in Fayette County
- Coordinates: 39°34′49″N 83°18′49″W
- Country: United States
- State: Ohio
- County: Fayette

Area
  - Total: 34.18 sq mi (88.52 km^{2})
  - Land: 34.17 sq mi (88.50 km^{2})
  - Water: 0.0077 sq mi (0.02 km^{2})
- Elevation: 932 ft (284 m)

Population (2020)
  - Total: 774
  - Density: 22.7/sq mi (8.75/km^{2})
- Time zone: UTC-5 (Eastern (EST))
  - Summer (DST): UTC-4 (EDT)
- FIPS code: 39-47684
- GNIS feature ID: 1086091

Marion Township is one of the ten townships of Fayette County, Ohio, United States. As of the 2020 census the population was 774.

== Geography ==
Located in the eastern part of the county, it borders the following townships:

- Madison Township - north
- Perry Township, Pickaway County - east
- Deerfield Township, Ross County - southeast corner
- Wayne Township - south
- Union Township - southwest
- Paint Township - northwest

Part of the village of New Holland is located in eastern Marion Township.

== Name and history ==
Marion Township was established on July 18, 1840, from land given by Madison Township.

It is one of twelve Marion Townships statewide.

== Government ==
The township is governed by a three-member board of trustees, who are elected in November of odd-numbered years to a four-year term beginning on the following January 1. Two are elected in the year after the presidential election and one is elected in the year before it. There is also an elected township fiscal officer, who serves a four-year term beginning on April 1 of the year after the election, which is held in November of the year before the presidential election. Vacancies in the fiscal officership or on the board of trustees are filled by the remaining trustees.
