= Rock Mills, Ohio =

Unincorporated community in Ohio, U.S.

Coordinates: 39°26′35″N 83°24′33″W

Rock Mills is an unincorporated community in Fayette County, in the U.S. state of Ohio.

== History ==
Former variant names were Rockville and Walton. The first settlement was made near the site in 1815. A mill was later built there. Rock Mills has been noted for the rock deposits near the town site.
