= Manara, Ohio =

Community in Fayette County, Ohio, US

- Unincorporated community
- Location within Ohio Location within the United States
- Coordinates: 39°36′09″N 83°18′47″W
- Country: United States
- State: Ohio
- Counties: Fayette
- Township: Marion
- Elevation: 899 ft (274 m)
- Time zone: UTC-5 (Eastern (EST))
  - Summer (DST): UTC-4 (EDT)
- ZIP code: 43145
- Area code: 740
- GNIS feature ID: 1062871

Manara is an unincorporated community in Marion Township, Fayette County, Ohio, United States. It is located at the intersection of Washington-Waterloo Road (Fayette County Highway 35) and Bloomingburg-New Holland Road (Fayette County Highway 27).

== History ==
Manara was laid out at the crossroads of two turnpikes. A post office called Manara was established in 1889, and remained in operation until 1902.

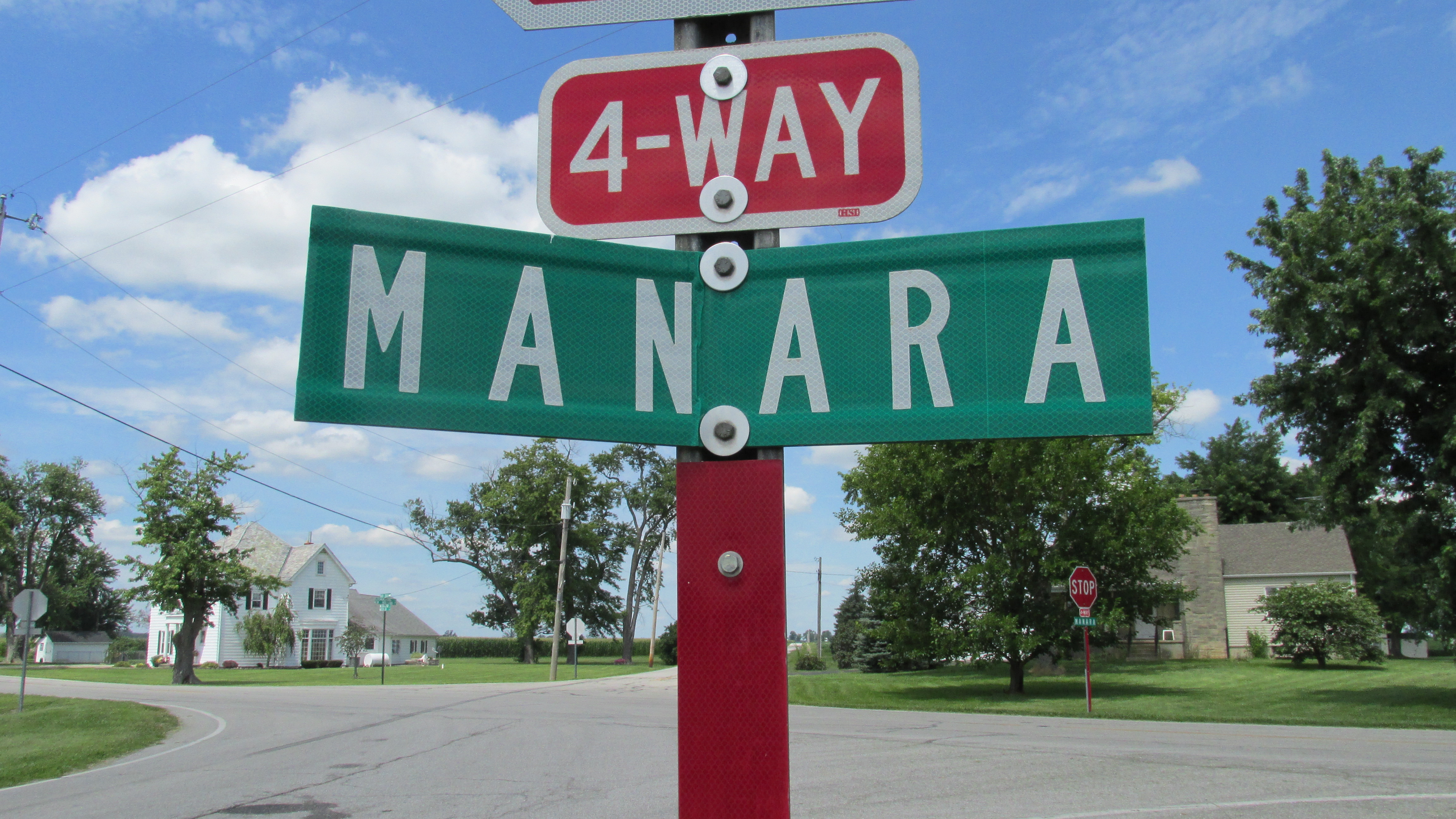
Manara community sign

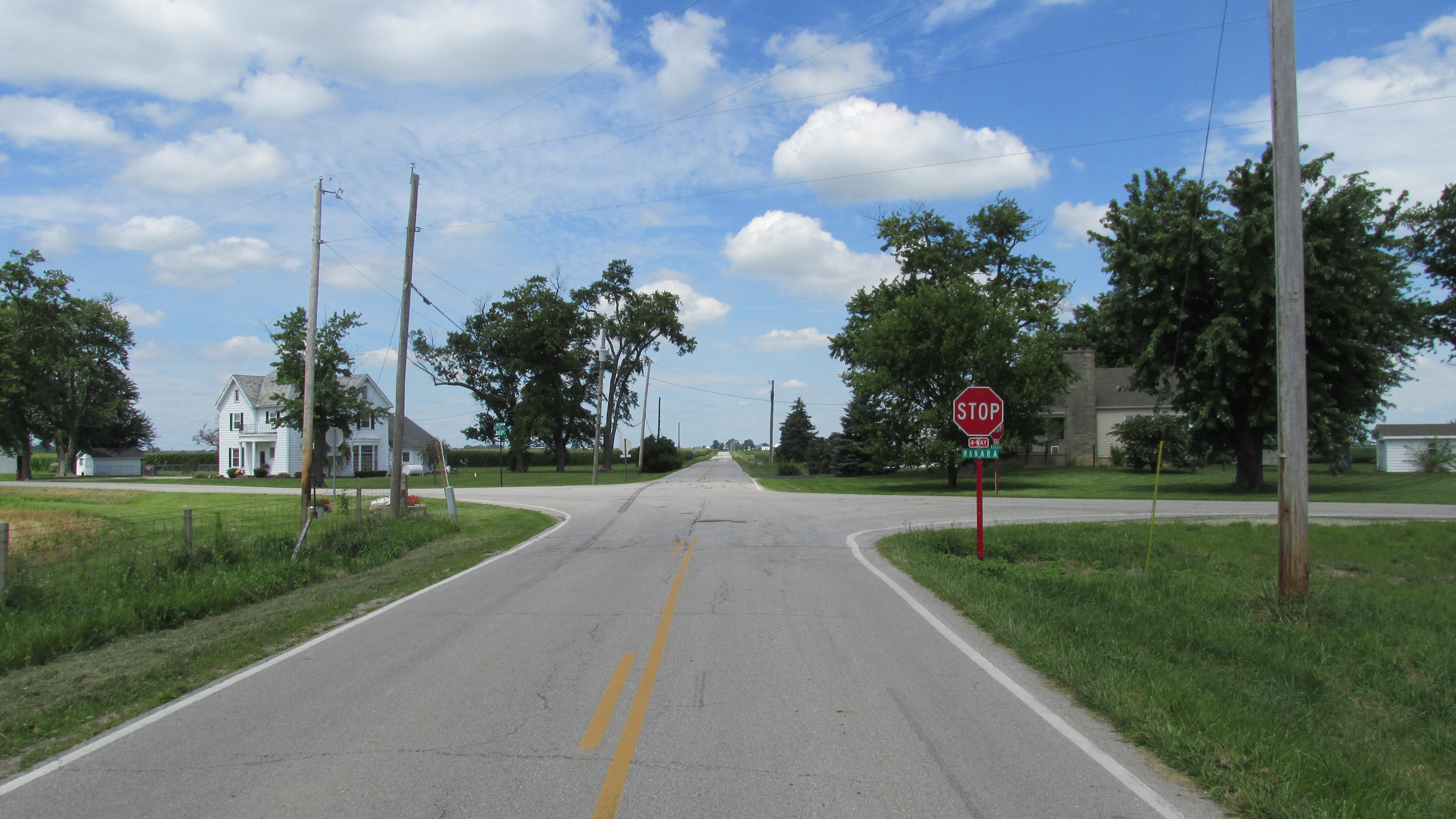
Intersection of Washington-Waterloo Road and Bloomingburg-New Holland Road in Manara, Ohio
