= McLean, Ohio =

Unincorporated community in Ohio, U.S.

Coordinates: 39°29′28″N 83°20′13″W

McLean is an unincorporated community in Fayette County, in the U.S. state of Ohio.

== History ==
The community has the name of James McLean, a landowner who allowed the railroad to build on his land in exchange for the naming rights. A post office called McLean was established in 1888, and remained in operation until 1928. McLean had 51 inhabitants in 1910.
