= Hagler, Ohio =

Unincorporated community in Ohio, U.S.

Coordinates: 39°35′17″N 83°30′50″W

Hagler is an unincorporated community in Fayette County, in the U.S. state of Ohio.

== History ==
A post office called Hagler was established in 1886, and remained in operation until 1906. The community has the name of Jesse and William Hagler, original owners of the town site.
