= Paint Township, Fayette County, Ohio =

Township in Ohio, US

- Township
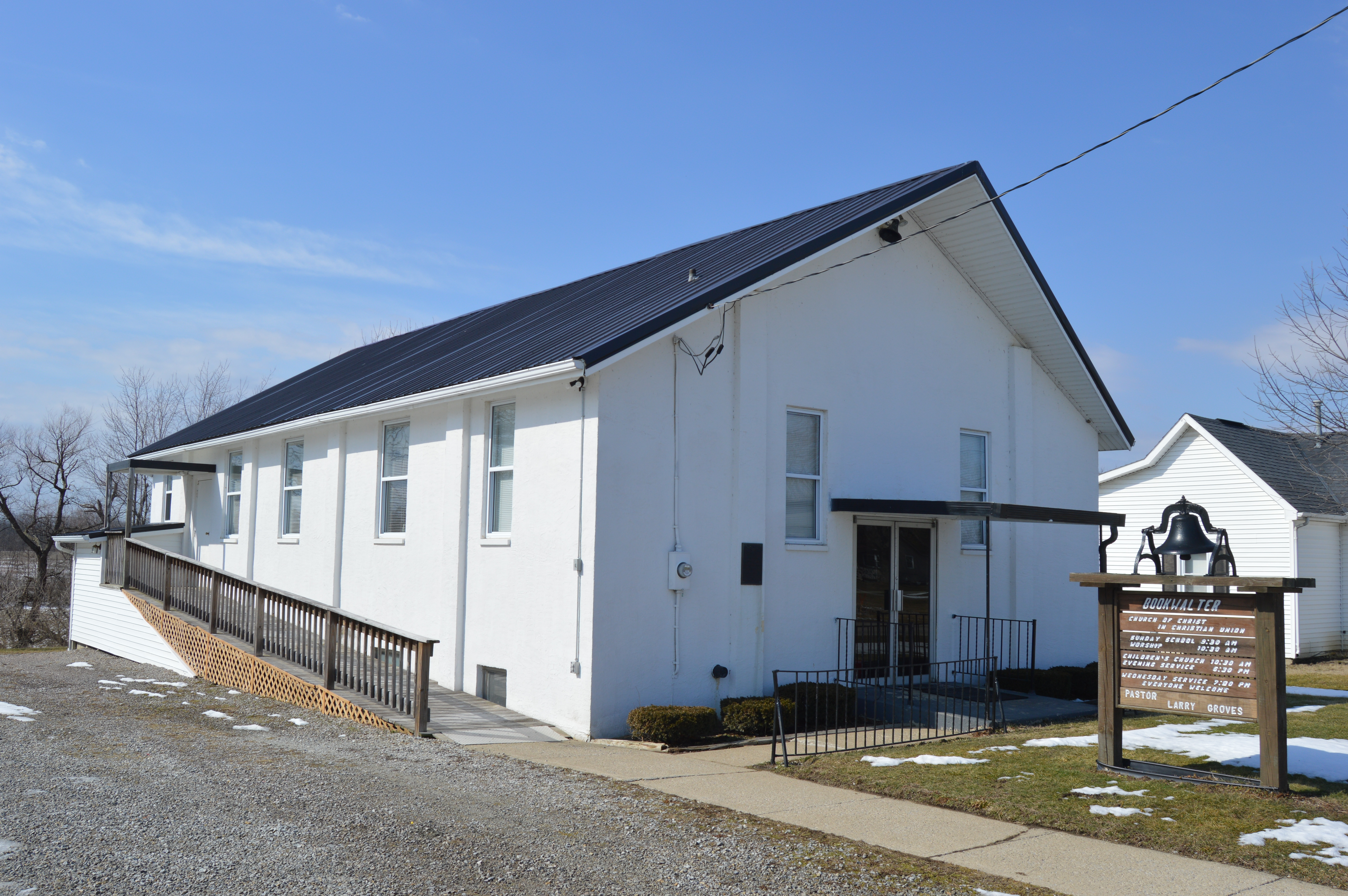
- Church of Christ in Christian Union at Bookwalter

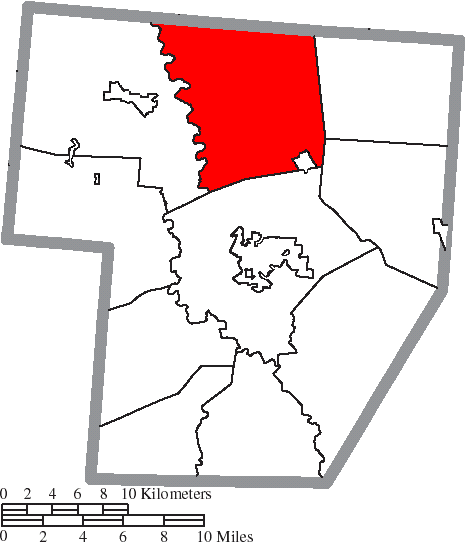
- Location of Paint Township in Fayette County
- Coordinates: 39°38′13″N 83°25′46″W
- Country: United States
- State: Ohio
- County: Fayette

Area
  - Total: 51.56 sq mi (133.55 km^{2})
  - Land: 51.54 sq mi (133.50 km^{2})
  - Water: 0.015 sq mi (0.04 km^{2})
- Elevation: 988 ft (301 m)

Population (2020)
  - Total: 1,825
  - Density: 35.41/sq mi (13.67/km^{2})
- Time zone: UTC-5 (Eastern (EST))
  - Summer (DST): UTC-4 (EDT)
- FIPS code: 39-59486
- GNIS feature ID: 1086092

Paint Township is one of the ten townships of Fayette County, Ohio, United States. As of the 2020 census the population was 1,825.

== Geography ==
Located in the northern part of the county, it borders the following townships:

- Range Township, Madison County - north
- Madison Township - east
- Marion Township - southeast
- Union Township - south
- Jefferson Township - west
- Stokes Township, Madison County - northwest

Most of the village of Bloomingburg is located in southeastern Paint Township.

== Name and history ==
Paint Township takes its name from the Paint Creek which flows through the township and enriches its soil. It is one of six Paint Townships statewide.

== Government ==
The township is governed by a three-member board of trustees, who are elected in November of odd-numbered years to a four-year term beginning on the following January 1. Two are elected in the year after the presidential election and one is elected in the year before it. There is also an elected township fiscal officer, who serves a four-year term beginning on April 1 of the year after the election, which is held in November of the year before the presidential election. Vacancies in the fiscal officership or on the board of trustees are filled by the remaining trustees.
