= Fayette County, Ohio =

County in Ohio, United States

- County
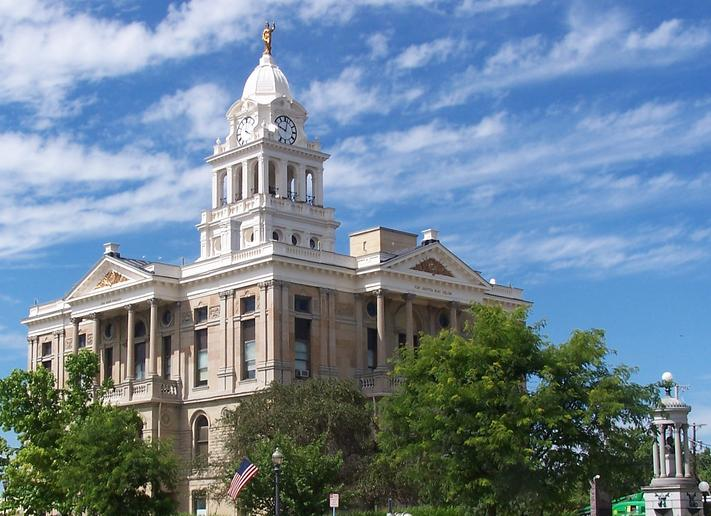
- Fayette County Courthouse

- Flag Seal

- Location within the U.S. state of Ohio
- Coordinates: 39°34′N 83°27′W
- Country: United States
- State: Ohio
- Founded: March 1, 1810
- Named for: Marquis de Lafayette
- Seat: Washington Court House
- Largest city: Washington Court House

Area
  - Total: 407 sq mi (1,050 km^{2})
  - Land: 406 sq mi (1,050 km^{2})
  - Water: 0.7 sq mi (1.8 km^{2}) 0.2%

Population (2020)
  - Total: 28,951
  - Estimate (2025): 28,552 ▼
  - Density: 71.3/sq mi (27.5/km^{2})
- Time zone: UTC−5 (Eastern)
  - Summer (DST): UTC−4 (EDT)
- Congressional districts: 2nd, 15th
- Website: www.fayette-co-oh.com

Fayette County is a county located in the U.S. state of Ohio. As of the 2020 census, the population was 28,951. Its county seat and largest city is Washington Court House. The county was named for the Marquis de Lafayette, a Frenchman who was an officer in the American Army in the Revolution, when established on March 1, 1810. Fayette County comprises the Washington Court House, OH Micropolitan Statistical Area, which is also included in the Columbus-Marion-Zanesville, OH Combined Statistical Area. Recently, on April 2, 2025, it was one of a few counties with minor damage from an EF-1 tornado in southern Ohio. The total costs of the damage have yet to be determined.

== History ==
Fayette County was formed on March 1, 1810, from portions of Highland and Ross Counties. It was named after Marie-Joseph Motier, Marquis de La Fayette, a French general and politician who took the side of the Colonials during the American Revolutionary War and who played an important role in the French Revolution.

== Parks ==
=== Trails ===
Tri-County Triangle Trail - This trail goes between Washington Court House and Chillicothe.

Clinton-Fayette Friendship Trail - This trail goes between Melvin to Borum Road and starts back at Bush Road to Jamison Road.

Xenia-Jamestown Connector - Opened in 2022, this trail allows travel from Xenia to Octa. This trail is 18.5 miles (29.8 km) long.

== Geography ==
According to the U.S. Census Bureau, the county has a total area of 407 square miles (1,050 km^{2}), of which 406 square miles (1,050 km^{2}) is land and 0.7 square miles (1.8 km^{2}) (0.2%) is water.

=== Adjacent counties ===
- Madison County (north)
- Pickaway County (northeast)
- Ross County (southeast)
- Highland County (south)
- Clinton County (southwest)
- Greene County (northwest)

== Demographics ==
Historical population
Census	Pop.	Note	%±
1810	1,854		—
1820	6,316		240.7%
1830	8,182		29.5%
1840	10,984		34.2%
1850	12,726		15.9%
1860	15,935		25.2%
1870	17,170		7.8%
1880	20,364		18.6%
1890	22,309		9.6%
1900	21,725		−2.6%
1910	21,744		0.1%
1920	21,518		−1.0%
1930	20,755		−3.5%
1940	21,385		3.0%
1950	22,554		5.5%
1960	24,775		9.8%
1970	25,461		2.8%
1980	27,467		7.9%
1990	27,466		0.0%
2000	28,433		3.5%
2010	29,030		2.1%
2020	28,951		−0.3%
2025 (est.)	28,552	▼	−1.4%
U.S. Decennial Census; 1790-1960 1900-1990; 1990-2000 2020

=== 2020 census ===
As of the 2020 census, the county had a population of 28,951. The median age was 41.5 years. 23.3% of residents were under the age of 18 and 19.2% of residents were 65 years of age or older. For every 100 females there were 94.8 males, and for every 100 females age 18 and over there were 93.5 males age 18 and over.

The racial makeup of the county was 91.6% White, 1.9% Black or African American, 0.2% American Indian and Alaska Native, 0.6% Asian, <0.1% Native Hawaiian and Pacific Islander, 0.8% from some other race, and 4.8% from two or more races. Hispanic or Latino residents of any race comprised 2.4% of the population.

51.9% of residents lived in urban areas, while 48.1% lived in rural areas.

There were 11,752 households in the county, of which 29.9% had children under the age of 18 living in them. Of all households, 45.0% were married-couple households, 18.9% were households with a male householder and no spouse or partner present, and 27.0% were households with a female householder and no spouse or partner present. About 28.9% of all households were made up of individuals and 13.6% had someone living alone who was 65 years of age or older.

There were 12,663 housing units, of which 7.2% were vacant. Among occupied housing units, 62.8% were owner-occupied and 37.2% were renter-occupied. The homeowner vacancy rate was 1.9% and the rental vacancy rate was 4.6%.

=== Racial and ethnic composition ===
Fayette County, Ohio – Racial and ethnic composition Note: the US Census treats Hispanic/Latino as an ethnic category. This table excludes Latinos from the racial categories and assigns them to a separate category. Hispanics/Latinos may be of any race.
Race / Ethnicity (NH = Non-Hispanic)	Pop 1980	Pop 1990	Pop 2000	Pop 2010	Pop 2020	% 1980	% 1990	% 2000	% 2010	% 2020
White alone (NH)	26,519	26,544	27,022	27,227	26,260	96.55%	96.64%	95.04%	93.79%	90.70%
Black or African American alone (NH)	718	655	568	569	521	2.61%	2.38%	2.00%	1.96%	1.80%
Native American or Alaska Native alone (NH)	20	49	41	59	43	0.07%	0.18%	0.14%	0.20%	0.15%
Asian alone (NH)	50	98	130	151	171	0.18%	0.36%	0.46%	0.52%	0.59%
Native Hawaiian or Pacific Islander alone (NH)	x	x	2	8	11	x	x	0.01%	0.03%	0.04%
Other race alone (NH)	24	31	17	32	88	0.09%	0.11%	0.06%	0.11%	0.30%
Mixed race or Multiracial (NH)	x	x	301	464	1,176	x	x	1.06%	1.60%	4.06%
Hispanic or Latino (any race)	136	89	352	520	681	0.50%	0.32%	1.24%	1.79%	2.35%
Total	27,467	27,466	28,433	29,030	28,951	100.00%	100.00%	100.00%	100.00%	100.00%

=== 2010 census ===
As of the census of 2010, there were 29,030 people, 11,436 households, and 7,834 families living in the county. The population density was 71.4 inhabitants per square mile (27.6/km^{2}). There were 12,693 housing units at an average density of 31.2 units per square mile (12.0 units/km^{2}). The racial makeup of the county was 94.63% White, 2.02% Black or African American, 0.23% Native American, 0.54% Asian, 0.03% Pacific Islander, 0.80% from other races, and 1.74% from two or more races. 1.79% of the population were Hispanic or Latino of any race.

There were 11,436 households, out of which 32.53% had children under the age of 18 living with them, 49.05% were married couples living together, 13.50% had a female householder with no husband present, and 31.50% were non-families. 25.80% of all households were made up of individuals, and 10.34% had someone living alone who was 65 years of age or older. The average household size was 2.49 and the average family size was 2.95.

In the county, the population was spread out, with 24.67% under the age of 18, 7.88% from 18 to 24, 24.89% from 25 to 44, 27.59% from 45 to 64, and 14.97% who were 65 years of age or older. The median age was 39.4 years. For every 100 females there were 96.69 males. For every 100 females age 18 and over, there were 93.56 males.

=== Income and poverty ===
As of 2013, the median income for a household in the county was $37,619, and the median income for a family was $45,108. Males had a median income of $30,516 versus $20,223 for females. The per capita income for the county was $20,603. About 16.1% of families and 20.1% of the population were below the poverty line, including 27.4% of those under age 18 and 9.1% of those age 65 or over.

== Politics ==
Fayette County is a stronghold of the Republican party in presidential elections; it has voted Democratic only four times since 1856.

United States presidential election results for Fayette County, Ohio
Year	Republican		Democratic		Third party(ies)	
Year	No.	%	No.	%	No.	%
1856	1,209	49.11%	880	35.74%	373	15.15%
1860	1,458	50.59%	1,121	38.90%	303	10.51%
1864	1,848	59.83%	1,241	40.17%	0	0.00%
1868	1,970	58.88%	1,376	41.12%	0	0.00%
1872	2,140	57.88%	1,545	41.79%	12	0.32%
1876	2,436	55.59%	1,874	42.77%	72	1.64%
1880	2,830	56.99%	2,111	42.51%	25	0.50%
1884	3,171	58.87%	2,160	40.10%	55	1.02%
1888	3,316	58.44%	2,192	38.63%	166	2.93%
1892	2,838	55.26%	1,989	38.73%	309	6.02%
1896	3,357	54.54%	2,748	44.65%	50	0.81%
1900	3,380	57.25%	2,438	41.29%	86	1.46%
1904	3,331	62.47%	1,880	35.26%	121	2.27%
1908	3,343	56.84%	2,451	41.68%	87	1.48%
1912	2,186	39.72%	2,261	41.08%	1,057	19.20%
1916	2,772	50.53%	2,616	47.69%	98	1.79%
1920	5,446	58.55%	3,812	40.98%	43	0.46%
1924	4,542	60.27%	2,696	35.77%	298	3.95%
1928	5,251	65.23%	2,752	34.19%	47	0.58%
1932	4,254	44.74%	5,157	54.24%	97	1.02%
1936	4,841	45.29%	5,807	54.33%	41	0.38%
1940	5,984	53.27%	5,249	46.73%	0	0.00%
1944	5,933	60.06%	3,945	39.94%	0	0.00%
1948	4,865	57.95%	3,513	41.85%	17	0.20%
1952	6,800	63.66%	3,882	36.34%	0	0.00%
1956	6,696	66.00%	3,449	34.00%	0	0.00%
1960	7,085	64.11%	3,966	35.89%	0	0.00%
1964	4,567	42.70%	6,128	57.30%	0	0.00%
1968	5,339	51.99%	2,966	28.88%	1,964	19.13%
1972	6,970	73.25%	2,344	24.63%	201	2.11%
1976	5,719	55.18%	4,477	43.20%	168	1.62%
1980	5,827	64.26%	2,810	30.99%	431	4.75%
1984	6,838	75.80%	2,126	23.57%	57	0.63%
1988	6,186	69.72%	2,623	29.56%	64	0.72%
1992	4,916	48.74%	2,976	29.51%	2,194	21.75%
1996	4,831	50.29%	3,665	38.15%	1,111	11.56%
2000	5,685	61.27%	3,363	36.25%	230	2.48%
2004	7,376	62.74%	4,334	36.86%	47	0.40%
2008	7,102	60.61%	4,401	37.56%	215	1.83%
2012	6,620	59.97%	4,249	38.49%	169	1.53%
2016	7,995	71.18%	2,739	24.39%	498	4.43%
2020	9,473	75.03%	2,975	23.56%	178	1.41%
2024	9,706	76.94%	2,773	21.98%	136	1.08%

United States Senate election results for Fayette County, Ohio1
Year	Republican		Democratic		Third party(ies)	
Year	No.	%	No.	%	No.	%
2024	8,712	70.30%	3,207	25.88%	474	3.82%

== Government ==
Fayette County has a 3-member Board of County Commissioners that oversee the various County departments, similar to all but 2 of the 88 Ohio counties. As of 2025, Fayette County's elected commissioners are Tony Anderson, Donnie Fleak, and Jim Garland.

== Transportation ==
=== Airports ===
The Fayette County Airport is located two nautical miles (2.3 mi; 3.7 km) north-northeast of Washington Court House's central business district.

=== Major highways ===
- I-71
- US 22
- US 35
- US 62
- SR 3
- SR 38
- SR 41
- SR 435
- SR 729
- SR 734
- SR 753

== Communities ==
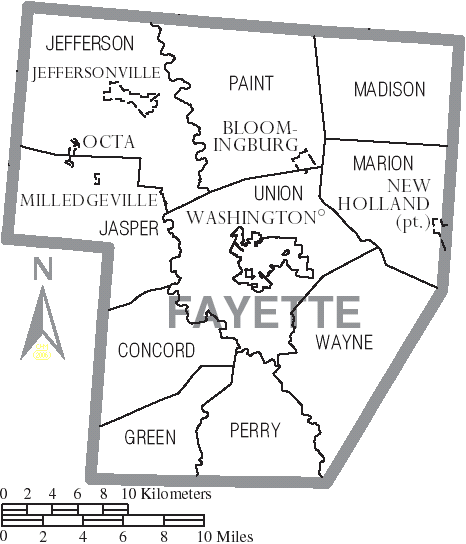
Map of Fayette County, Ohio with Municipal and Township Labels

=== City ===
- Washington Court House (county seat)

=== Villages ===
- Bloomingburg
- Jeffersonville
- Milledgeville
- New Holland (partly in Pickaway County)
- Octa

=== Townships ===
- Concord
- Green
- Jasper
- Jefferson
- Madison
- Marion
- Paint
- Perry
- Union
- Wayne

=== Census-designated places ===
- Good Hope
- Pancoastburg

=== Unincorporated communities ===
- Blessing
- Bookwalter
- Boyds
- Buena Vista
- Cook
- Cunningham
- Eber
- Edgefield
- Fairview
- Georgetown
- Ghormley
- Glendon
- Hagler
- Jasper Mills
- Johnson
- Luray
- Luttrell
- Madison Mills
- Manara
- McLean
- New Martinsburg
- Parrott
- Plano
- Pleasant View
- Rock Mills
- Shady Grove
- South Plymouth
- Staunton
- West Lancaster
- White Oak
- Yankeetown
- Yatesville

== See also ==
- National Register of Historic Places listings in Fayette County, Ohio
