= Union Township, Fayette County, Ohio =

Township in Ohio, US

- Township
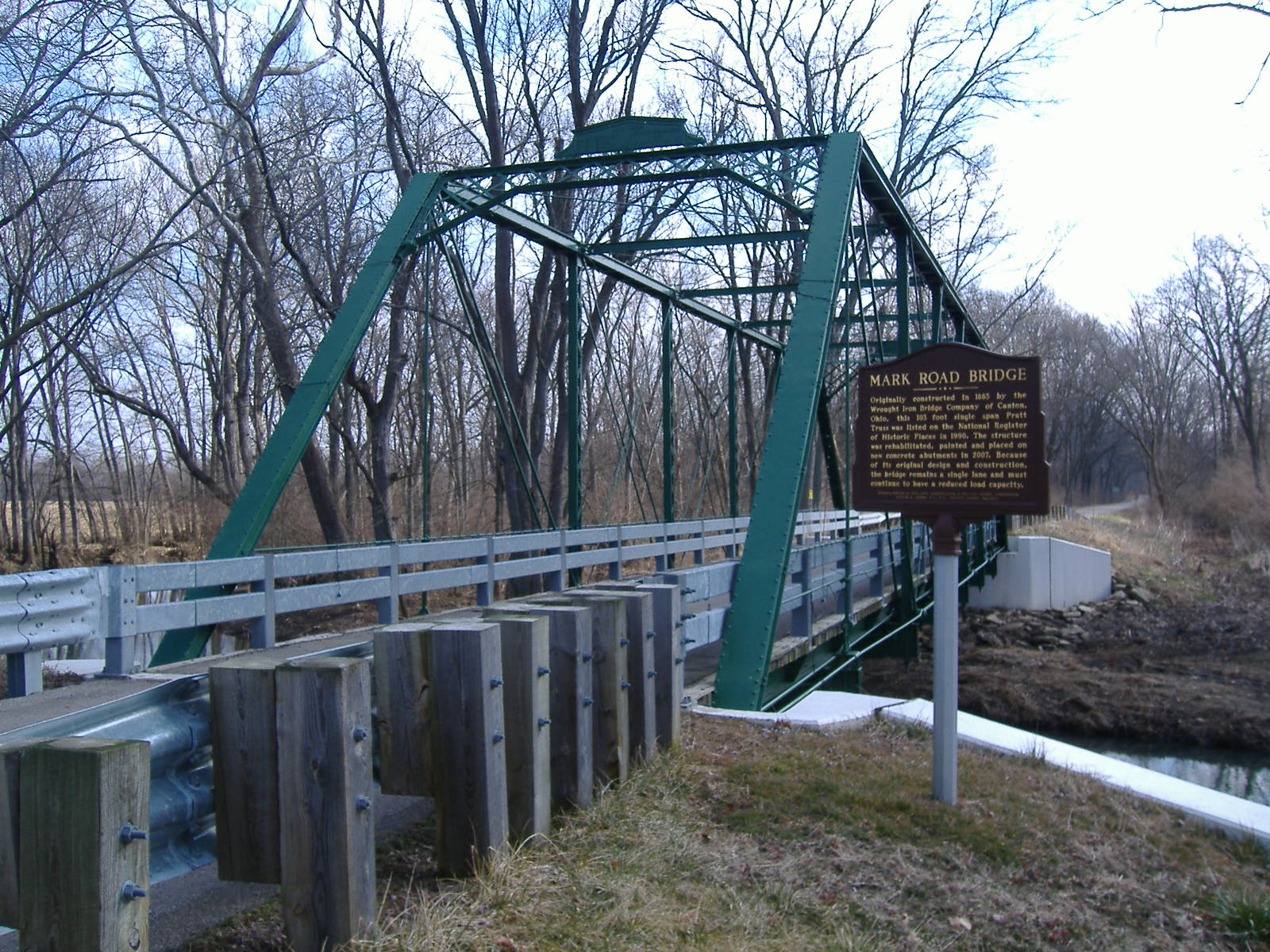
- The Mark Road Bridge over Sugar Creek

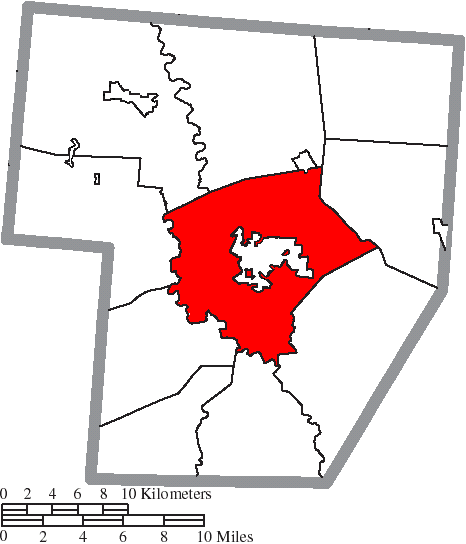
- Location of Union Township in Fayette County
- Coordinates: 39°32′50″N 83°26′21″W
- Country: United States
- State: Ohio
- County: Fayette

Area
  - Total: 49.0 sq mi (126.8 km^{2})
  - Land: 48.9 sq mi (126.7 km^{2})
  - Water: 0.039 sq mi (0.1 km^{2})
- Elevation: 978 ft (298 m)

Population (2020)
  - Total: 3,598
  - Density: 73.55/sq mi (28.40/km^{2})
- Time zone: UTC-5 (Eastern (EST))
  - Summer (DST): UTC-4 (EDT)
- FIPS code: 39-78316
- GNIS feature ID: 1086094
- Website: www.utfay.com

Union Township is one of the ten townships of Fayette County, Ohio, United States. At the 2020 census the population was 3,598.

== Geography ==
Located at the center of the county, it borders the following townships:

- Paint Township - north
- Marion Township - northeast
- Wayne Township - southeast
- Perry Township - south
- Concord Township - southwest
- Jasper Township - west
- Jefferson Township - northwest

Union Township is the only township in the county that does not border another county.

Central Union Township is occupied by the county seat of Washington Court House, the only city in Fayette County. A small corner of the village of Bloomingburg also sits in the northeastern part of the township.

== Name and history ==
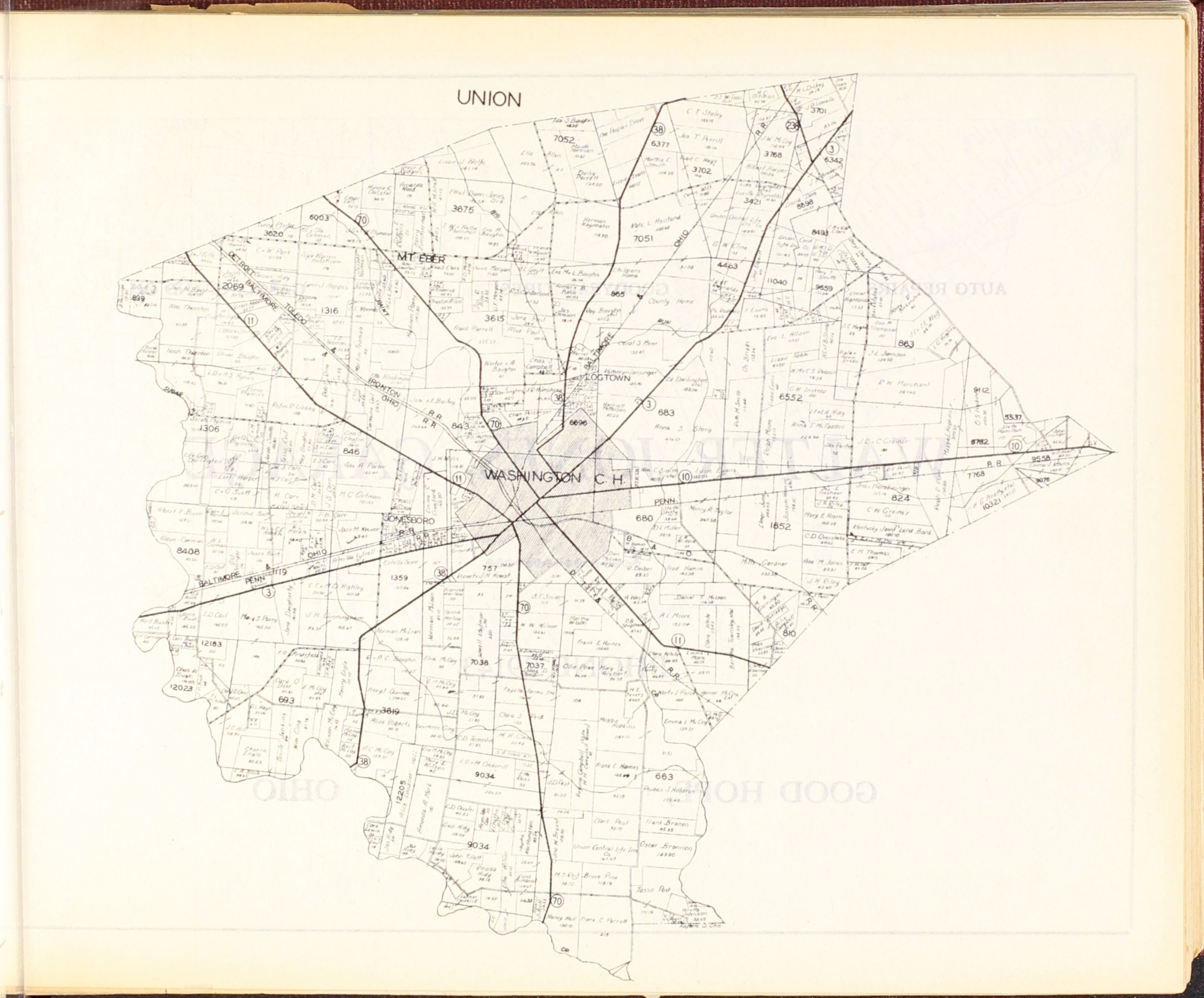
Union Township in 1935

It is one of twenty-seven Union Townships statewide.

In 1833, Union Township contained two gristmills and two saw mills, a fulling mill, and a carding machine.

== Government ==
The township is governed by a three-member board of trustees, who are elected in November of odd-numbered years to a four-year term beginning on the following January 1. Two are elected in the year after the presidential election and one is elected in the year before it. There is also an elected township fiscal officer, who serves a four-year term beginning on April 1 of the year after the election, which is held in November of the year before the presidential election. Vacancies in the fiscal officership or on the board of trustees are filled by the remaining trustees.
