= Jefferson Township, Fayette County, Ohio =

Township in Ohio, US

- Township
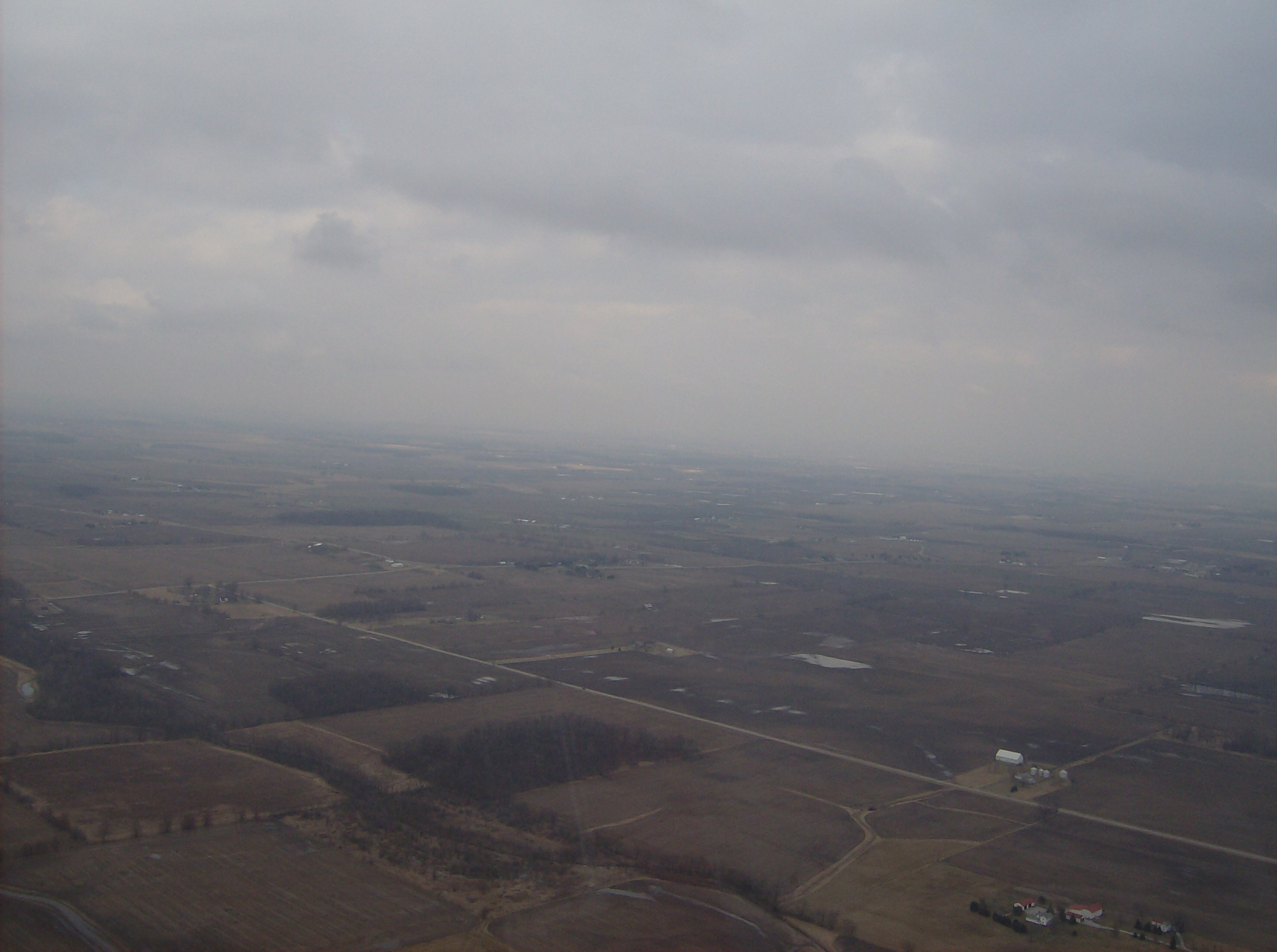
- Countryside in western Jefferson Township

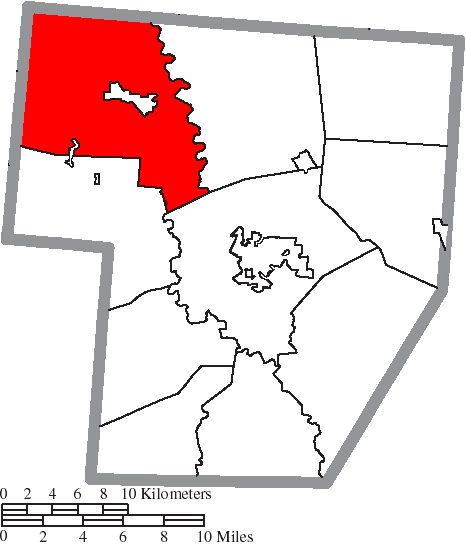
- Location of Jefferson Township in Fayette County
- Coordinates: 39°39′7″N 83°34′20″W
- Country: United States
- State: Ohio
- County: Fayette

Area
  - Total: 61.1 sq mi (158.2 km^{2})
  - Land: 61.0 sq mi (158.0 km^{2})
  - Water: 0.077 sq mi (0.2 km^{2})
- Elevation: 1,050 ft (320 m)

Population (2020)
  - Total: 2,607
  - Density: 42.73/sq mi (16.50/km^{2})
- Time zone: UTC-5 (Eastern (EST))
  - Summer (DST): UTC-4 (EDT)
- FIPS code: 39-38598
- GNIS feature ID: 1086089
- Website: https://jeffersontwpfayette.org/

Jefferson Township is one of the ten townships of Fayette County, Ohio, United States. As of the 2020 census the population was 2,607.

== Geography ==
Located in the northwestern corner of the county, it borders the following townships:

- Stokes Township, Madison County - north
- Paint Township - east
- Union Township - southeast
- Jasper Township - south
- Silvercreek Township, Greene County - southwest
- Ross Township, Greene County - northwest

Two villages are located in Jefferson Township: Jeffersonville, the second largest municipality in Fayette County, in the center, and part of Octa in the southwest.

== Name and history ==
It is one of twenty-four Jefferson Townships statewide.

== Government ==
The township is governed by a three-member board of trustees, who are elected in November of odd-numbered years to a four-year term beginning on the following January 1. Two are elected in the year after the presidential election and one is elected in the year before it. There is also an elected township fiscal officer, who serves a four-year term beginning on April 1 of the year after the election, which is held in November of the year before the presidential election. Vacancies in the fiscal officership or on the board of trustees are filled by the remaining trustees.
