= Madison Township, Fayette County, Ohio =

Township in Ohio, US

- Township
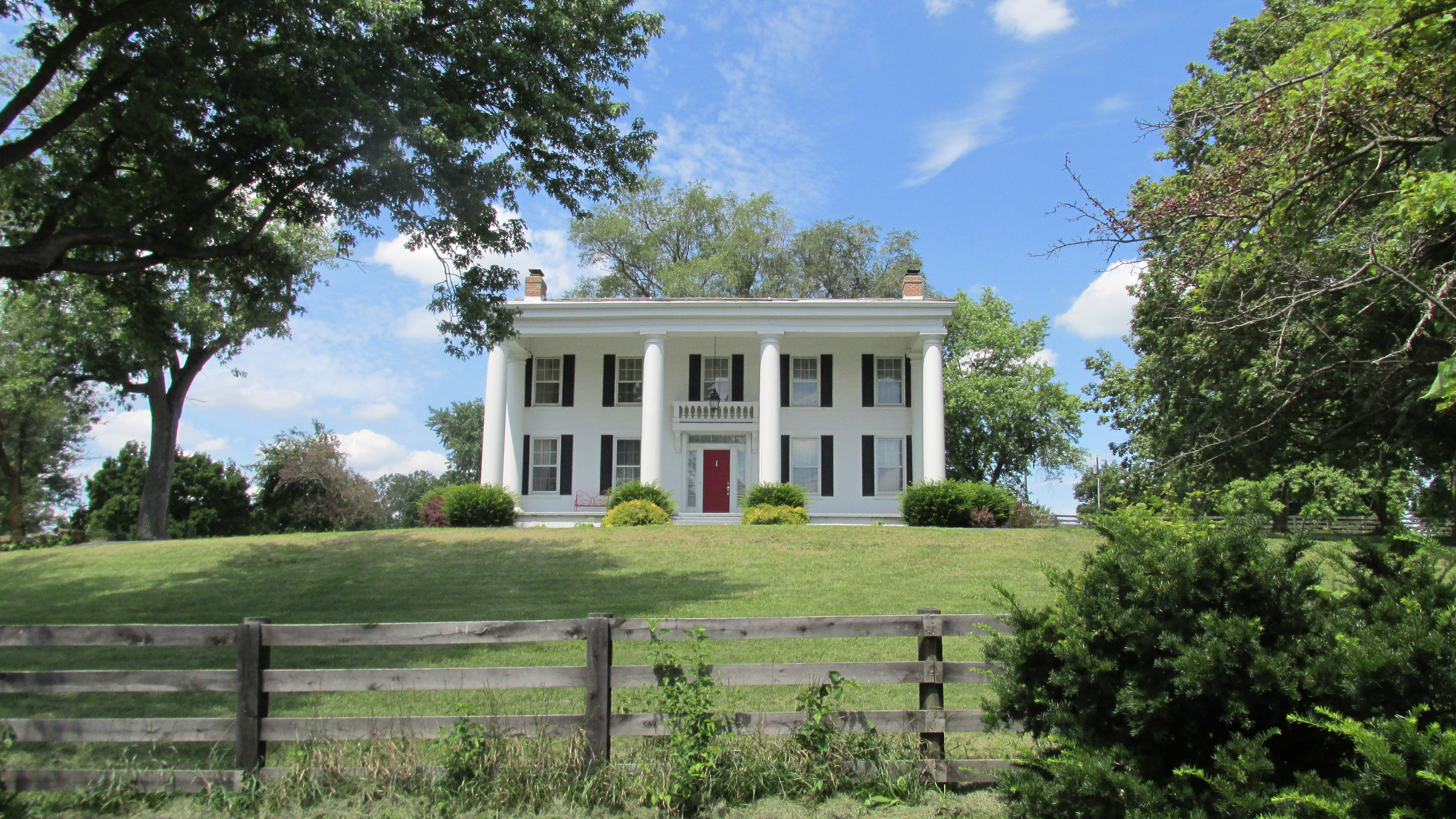
- The William McCafferty Farmhouse on State Route 207

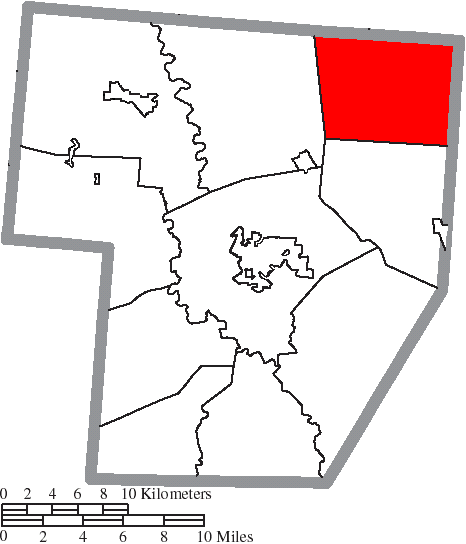
- Location of Madison Township in Fayette County
- Coordinates: 39°39′32″N 83°18′3″W
- Country: United States
- State: Ohio
- County: Fayette

Area
  - Total: 35.7 sq mi (92.5 km^{2})
  - Land: 35.4 sq mi (91.7 km^{2})
  - Water: 0.31 sq mi (0.8 km^{2})
- Elevation: 909 ft (277 m)

Population (2020)
  - Total: 1,102
  - Density: 31.1/sq mi (12.0/km^{2})
- Time zone: UTC-5 (Eastern (EST))
  - Summer (DST): UTC-4 (EDT)
- FIPS code: 39-46396
- GNIS feature ID: 1086090

Madison Township is one of the ten townships of Fayette County, Ohio, United States. As of the 2020 census the population was 1,102.

== Geography ==
Located in the northeastern corner of the county, it borders the following townships:

- Pleasant Township, Madison County - north
- Monroe Township, Pickaway County - east
- Perry Township, Pickaway County - southeast
- Marion Township - south
- Paint Township - west
- Range Township, Madison County - northwest

No municipalities are located in Madison Township, although the census-designated place of Pancoastburg is located within the township.

== Name and history ==
It is one of twenty Madison Townships statewide.

== Government ==
The township is governed by a three-member board of trustees, who are elected in November of odd-numbered years to a four-year term beginning on the following January 1. Two are elected in the year after the presidential election and one is elected in the year before it. There is also an elected township fiscal officer, who serves a four-year term beginning on April 1 of the year after the election, which is held in November of the year before the presidential election. Vacancies in the fiscal officership or on the board of trustees are filled by the remaining trustees.
