= Bloomingburg, Ohio =

Village in Fayette County, Ohio, US

- Village
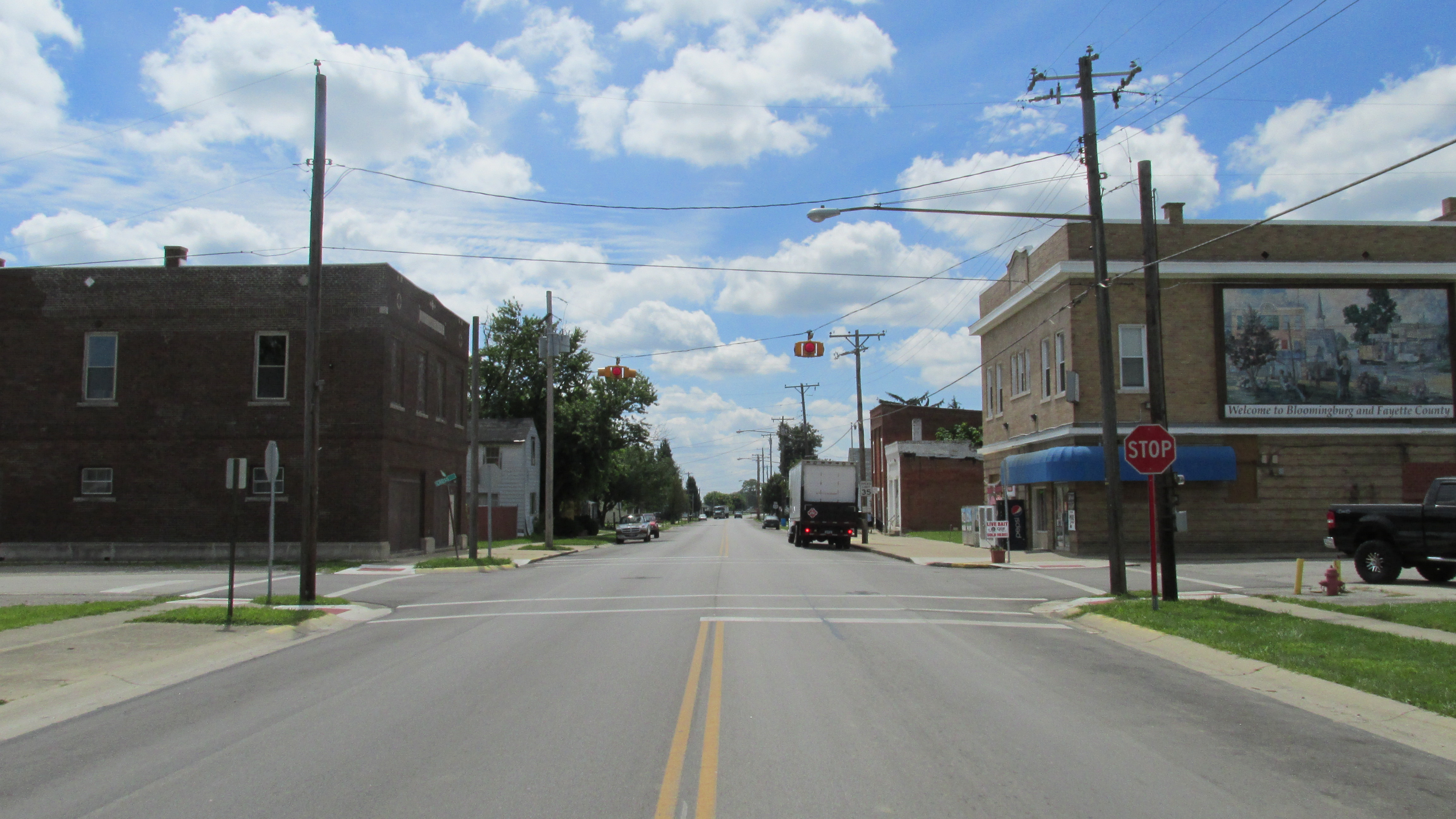
- Looking south on Main Street in Bloomingburg

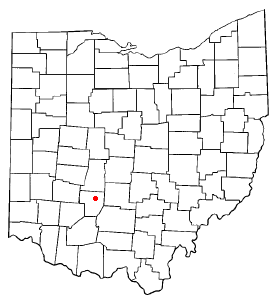
- Location of Bloomingburg, Ohio

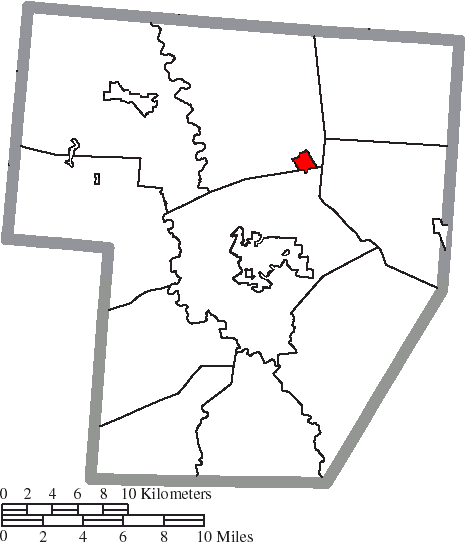
- Location of Bloomingburg in Fayette County
- Coordinates: 39°36′29″N 83°23′43″W
- Country: United States
- State: Ohio
- County: Fayette

Area
  - Total: 0.69 sq mi (1.78 km^{2})
  - Land: 0.69 sq mi (1.78 km^{2})
  - Water: 0 sq mi (0.00 km^{2})
- Elevation: 994 ft (303 m)

Population (2020)
  - Total: 878
  - Estimate (2023): 872
  - Density: 1,281.1/sq mi (494.64/km^{2})
- Time zone: UTC-5 (Eastern (EST))
  - Summer (DST): UTC-4 (EDT)
- ZIP code: 43106
- Area code: 740
- FIPS code: 39-07188
- GNIS feature ID: 2398136

Bloomingburg is a village in Fayette County, Ohio, United States. The population was 878 at the 2020 census.

== History ==
Bloomingburg was laid out in 1815. According to tradition, the village was named for the many flowers kept in the yards of the townswomen. A post office has been in operation at Bloomingburg since 1819. Bloomingburg was noted as a "stop" on the Underground Railroad.

== Geography ==
According to the United States Census Bureau, the village has a total area of 0.70 square miles (1.81 km^{2}), all land.

== Demographics ==
Historical population
Census	Pop.	Note	%±
1870	312		—
1880	526		68.6%
1890	638		21.3%
1900	636		−0.3%
1910	610		−4.1%
1920	552		−9.5%
1930	543		−1.6%
1940	567		4.4%
1950	623		9.9%
1960	719		15.4%
1970	895		24.5%
1980	869		−2.9%
1990	769		−11.5%
2000	874		13.7%
2010	938		7.3%
2020	878		−6.4%
2023 (est.)	872	▼	−0.7%
U.S. Decennial Census

=== 2010 census ===
As of the census of 2010, there were 938 people, 321 households, and 239 families living in the village. The population density was 1,340.0 inhabitants per square mile (517.4/km^{2}). There were 368 housing units at an average density of 525.7 per square mile (203.0/km^{2}). The racial makeup of the village was 88.6% White, 3.1% African American, 0.6% Native American, 6.2% from other races, and 1.5% from two or more races. Hispanic or Latino of any race were 6.9% of the population.

There were 321 households, of which 46.4% had children under the age of 18 living with them, 49.5% were married couples living together, 17.1% had a female householder with no husband present, 7.8% had a male householder with no wife present, and 25.5% were non-families. 19.3% of all households were made up of individuals, and 5.9% had someone living alone who was 65 years of age or older. The average household size was 2.92 and the average family size was 3.31.

The median age in the village was 30.8 years. 32.1% of residents were under the age of 18; 8.4% were between the ages of 18 and 24; 29% were from 25 to 44; 20.7% were from 45 to 64; and 9.7% were 65 years of age or older. The gender makeup of the village was 51.7% male and 48.3% female.

=== 2000 census ===
As of the census of 2000, there were 874 people, 309 households, and 221 families living in the village. The population density was 1,253.6 inhabitants per square mile (484.0/km^{2}). There were 332 housing units at an average density of 476.2 per square mile (183.9/km^{2}). The racial makeup of the village was 92.33% White, 4.81% African American, 0.23% Native American, 1.95% from other races, and 0.69% from two or more races. Hispanic or Latino of any race were 3.78% of the population.

There were 309 households, out of which 41.4% had children under the age of 18 living with them, 52.1% were married couples living together, 12.6% had a female householder with no husband present, and 28.2% were non-families. 22.7% of all households were made up of individuals, and 8.1% had someone living alone who was 65 years of age or older. The average household size was 2.78 and the average family size was 3.18.

In the village, the population was spread out, with 30.9% under the age of 18, 10.6% from 18 to 24, 30.2% from 25 to 44, 19.6% from 45 to 64, and 8.7% who were 65 years of age or older. The median age was 30 years. For every 100 females there were 100.5 males. For every 100 females age 18 and over, there were 104.1 males.

The median income for a household in the village was $31,346, and the median income for a family was $31,979. Males had a median income of $25,595 versus $20,855 for females. The per capita income for the village was $12,281. About 11.1% of families and 16.0% of the population were below the poverty line, including 20.6% of those under age 18 and 9.6% of those age 65 or over.

== Gallery ==
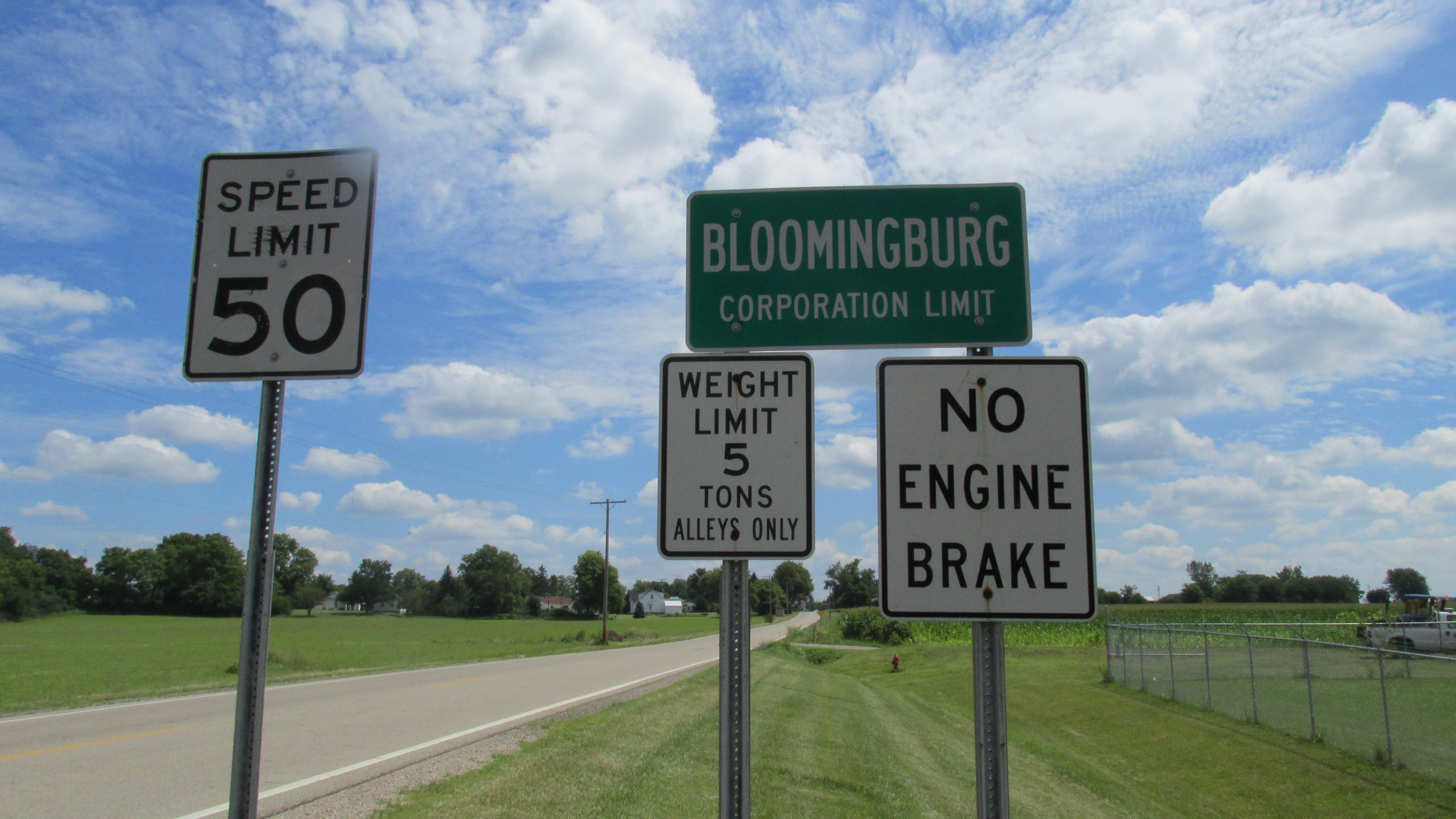
Bloomingburg corporation limit sign

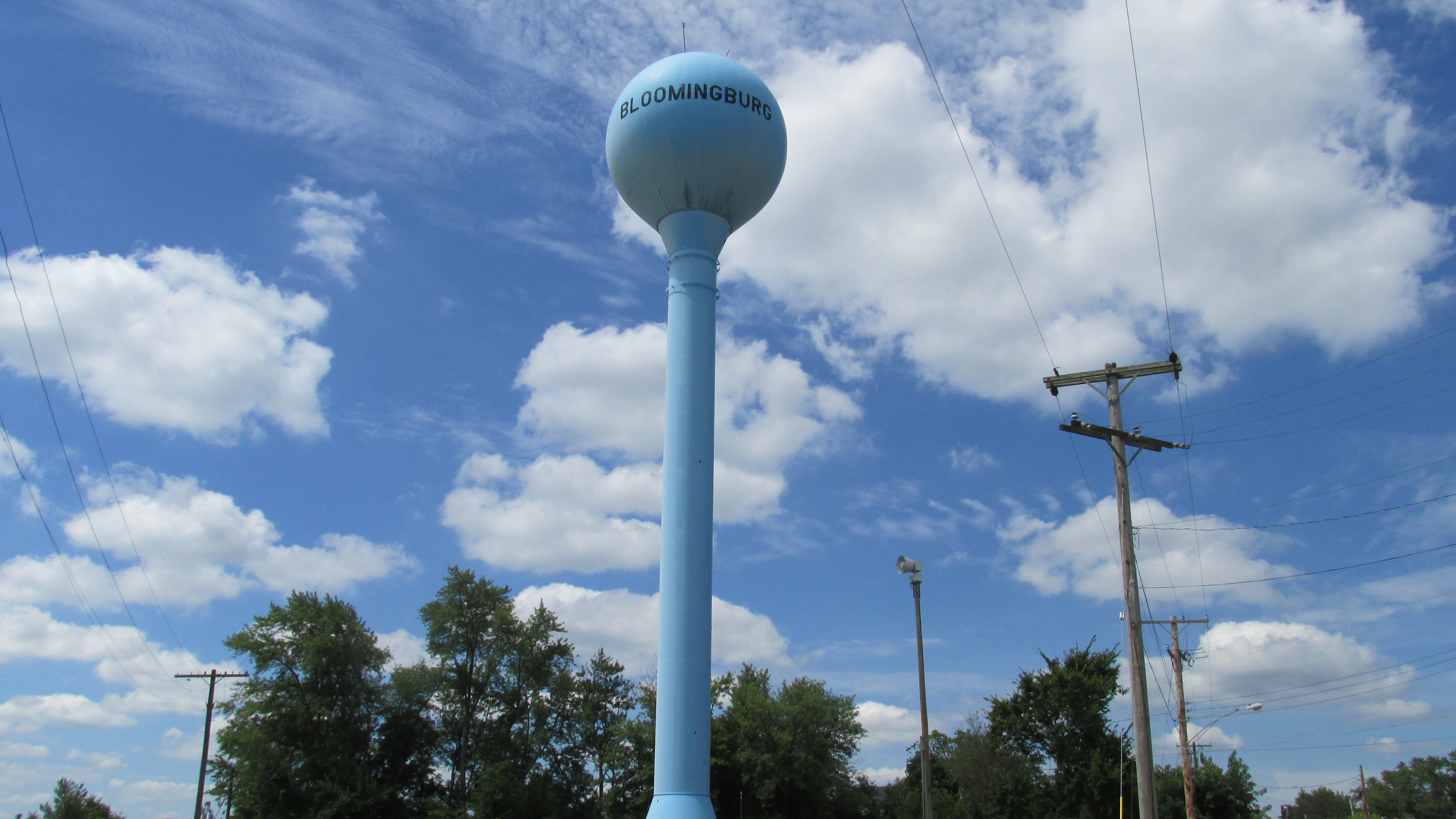
Water tower in Bloomingburg

== Notable people ==
- B. C. Edwards, third head football coach for the Illinois State Redbirds
- Art Schlichter, Former National Football League QuarterBack
