= National Register of Historic Places listings in Fayette County, Ohio =

Location of Fayette County in Ohio

This is a list of the National Register of Historic Places listings in Fayette County, Ohio.

This is intended to be a complete list of the properties and districts on the National Register of Historic Places in Fayette County, Ohio, United States. The locations of National Register properties and districts for which the latitude and longitude coordinates are included below, may be seen in a Google map.

There are 17 properties and districts listed on the National Register in the county.

This National Park Service list is complete through NPS recent listings posted March 14, 2025.

== Current listings ==
	Name on the Register	Image	Date listed	Location	City or town	Description
1	William Burnett House	William Burnett House	March 22, 1989 (#89000176)	1613 U.S. Route 62, SW. 39°31′28″N 83°27′30″W	Washington Court House	Destroyed
2	Fayette County Courthouse	Fayette County Courthouse	July 2, 1973 (#73001433)	Main and Columbus Sts. 39°32′11″N 83°26′24″W	Washington Court House	
3	Jackson Mound	Jackson Mound	October 21, 1975 (#75001397)	East of State Route 207, 4 miles (6.4 km) north of Pancoastburg; 39°40′40″N 83°15′55″W	Madison Township	
4	Judy Chapel	Judy Chapel	May 8, 1998 (#98000441)	1741 Washington Ave. 39°32′23″N 83°25′16″W	Washington Court House	
5	Barney Kelley House	Barney Kelley House	April 17, 1979 (#79001834)	321 E. East St. 39°32′12″N 83°26′10″W	Washington Court House	
6	Jacob Light House	Jacob Light House	January 13, 1989 (#88003191)	123 W. Circle Ave. 39°31′53″N 83°26′13″W	Washington Court House	
7	Mark Road Bridge	Mark Road Bridge	July 26, 1990 (#90001118)	Mark Rd. over Sugar Creek, north of Staunton; 39°29′13″N 83°28′23″W	Concord and Union Townships	
8	William McCafferty Farmhouse	William McCafferty Farmhouse	April 23, 1987 (#87000633)	7099 State Route 207, NE., south of Mount Sterling; 39°39′31″N 83°16′12″W	Madison Township	
9	Rawlings-Brownell House	Rawlings-Brownell House	March 10, 1988 (#88000207)	318 Rawlings St. 39°32′29″N 83°26′28″W	Washington Court House	
10	Robinson-Pavey House	Robinson-Pavey House	April 23, 1987 (#87000638)	421 W. Court St. 39°31′57″N 83°26′39″W	Washington Court House	
11	Morris Sharp House	Morris Sharp House	January 21, 1974 (#74001483)	517 Columbus St. 39°32′21″N 83°26′06″W	Washington Court House	
12	Edward Smith Jr. Farm	Edward Smith Jr. Farm	December 9, 1987 (#87002110)	2085 U.S. Route 62, northeast of Washington Court House; 39°33′16″N 83°25′10″W	Union Township	
13	Sollars Farmstead	Sollars Farmstead	May 2, 1995 (#95000493)	Along State Route 41 south of Washington Court House; 39°25′31″N 83°23′42″W	Perry Township	
14	Washington Cemetery Historic District	Washington Cemetery Historic District	September 6, 2006 (#06000765)	1741 Washington Ave. 39°32′19″N 83°25′00″W	Washington Court House	
15	Washington Court House Commercial Historic District	Washington Court House Commercial Historic District	September 12, 1985 (#85002351)	Roughly bounded by N. North, East, Hinde, and Market Sts. 39°32′09″N 83°26′20″W	Washington Court House	
16	Washington School	Washington School	January 14, 2013 (#12001181)	318 N. North St. 39°32′24″N 83°26′24″W	Washington Court House	
17	Woodlawn Farm	Woodlawn Farm	February 13, 1986 (#86000237)	3789 State Route 41, NW., northwest of Washington Court House; 39°34′35″N 83°28′31″W	Union Township	

== See also ==
- List of National Historic Landmarks in Ohio
- Listings in neighboring counties: Clinton, Greene, Highland, Madison, Pickaway, Ross
- National Register of Historic Places listings in Ohio
