= James D. Post =

American politician

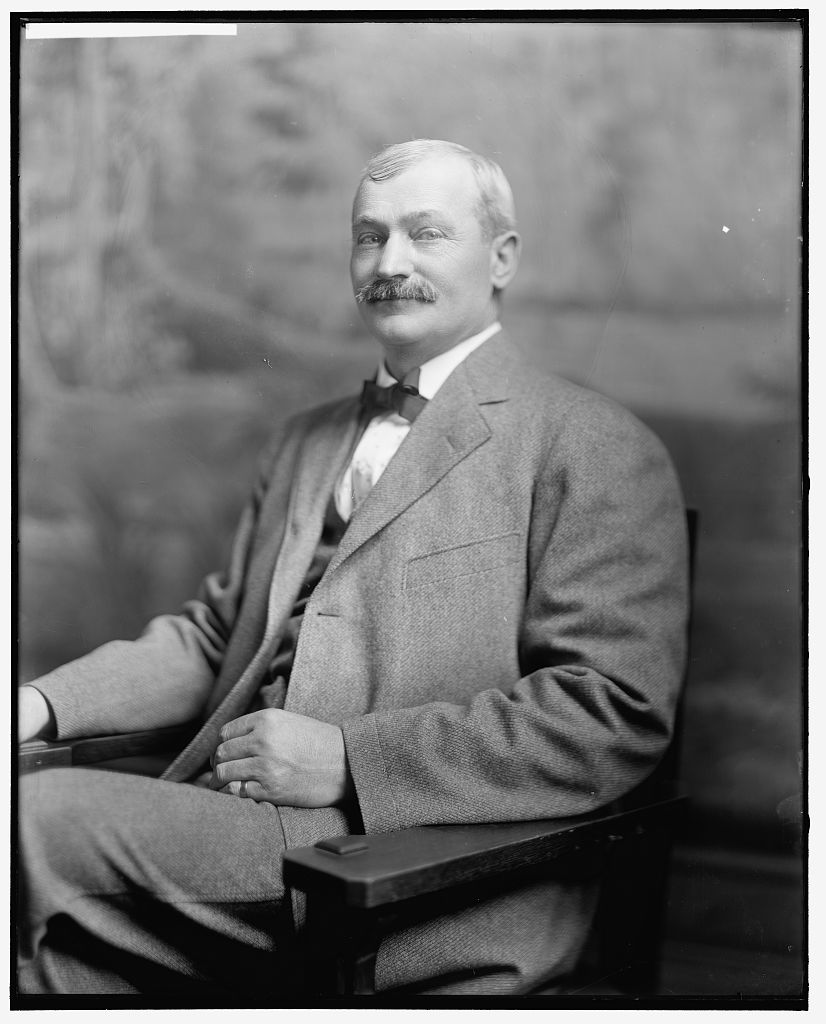

Member of the U.S. House of Representatives from Ohio's 7th district
- In office March 4, 1911 – March 3, 1915
- Preceded by: J. Warren Keifer
- Succeeded by: Simeon D. Fess

Personal details
- Born: James Douglass Post; November 25, 1863 Milledgeville, Ohio, US
- Died: April 1, 1921 (aged 57) Washington Court House, Ohio, US
- Resting place: Washington Cemetery
- Party: Democratic
- Education: National Normal University

James Douglass Post (November 25, 1863 – April 1, 1921) was an American educator, lawyer, and politician who served for two terms as a U.S. representative from Ohio from 1911 to 1915.

== Biography ==
Born near Milledgeville, Ohio, Post attended the common schools and was graduated from the National Normal University, Lebanon, Ohio, in 1882. He engaged in teaching for five years, after which he studied law and was admitted to the bar in 1887 and commenced practice at Washington Court House, Ohio.

== Congress ==
Post was elected as a Democrat to the Sixty-second and Sixty-third Congresses (March 4, 1911 – March 3, 1915). He served as chairman of the Committee on Elections No. 1 during the Sixty-third Congress, but he was not a candidate for renomination in 1914.

== Later career and death ==
He resumed the practice of law at Washington Court House, and died there April 1, 1921, after which he was interred in Washington Cemetery.

== Sources ==
- United States Congress. "James D. Post (id: P000454)". Biographical Directory of the United States Congress.

U.S. House of Representatives
Preceded by J. Warren Keifer	Member of the U.S. House of Representatives from Ohio's 7th congressional district March 4, 1911–March 3, 1915	Succeeded by Simeon D. Fess
