= Pancoastburg, Ohio =

Community in Fayette County, Ohio, US

- Census-designated place
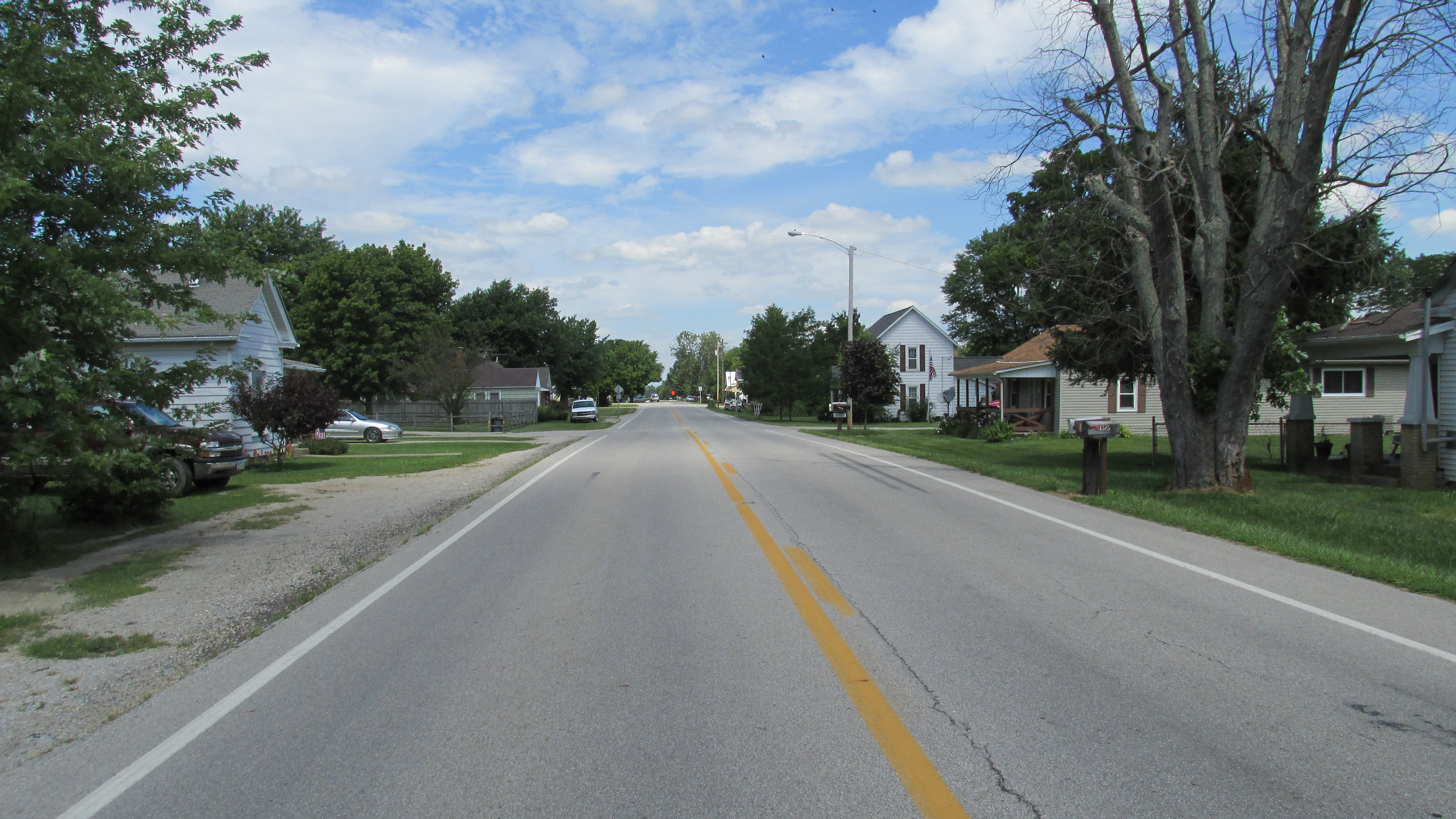
- Looking north on Ohio State Route 207 in Pancoastburg

- Location within Ohio Location within the United States
- Coordinates: 39°37′32″N 83°15′52″W
- Country: United States
- State: Ohio
- County: Fayette
- Township: Madison

Area
  - Total: 0.35 sq mi (0.90 km^{2})
  - Land: 0.34 sq mi (0.88 km^{2})
  - Water: 0.0039 sq mi (0.01 km^{2})
- Elevation: 863 ft (263 m)

Population (2020)
  - Total: 68
  - Density: 199.6/sq mi (77.07/km^{2})
- Time zone: UTC-5 (Eastern (EST))
  - Summer (DST): UTC-4 (EDT)
- ZIP code: 43160
- Area code: 740
- GNIS feature ID: 2628950
- FIPS code: 39-59724

Pancoastburg (originally known as Pancoastburgh) is an unincorporated community and census-designated place (CDP) in Madison Township, Fayette County, Ohio, United States. It is located along Ohio State Route 207, about 6 miles (10 km) south of Mount Sterling. As of the 2020 census the population of Pancoastburg was 68.

== History ==
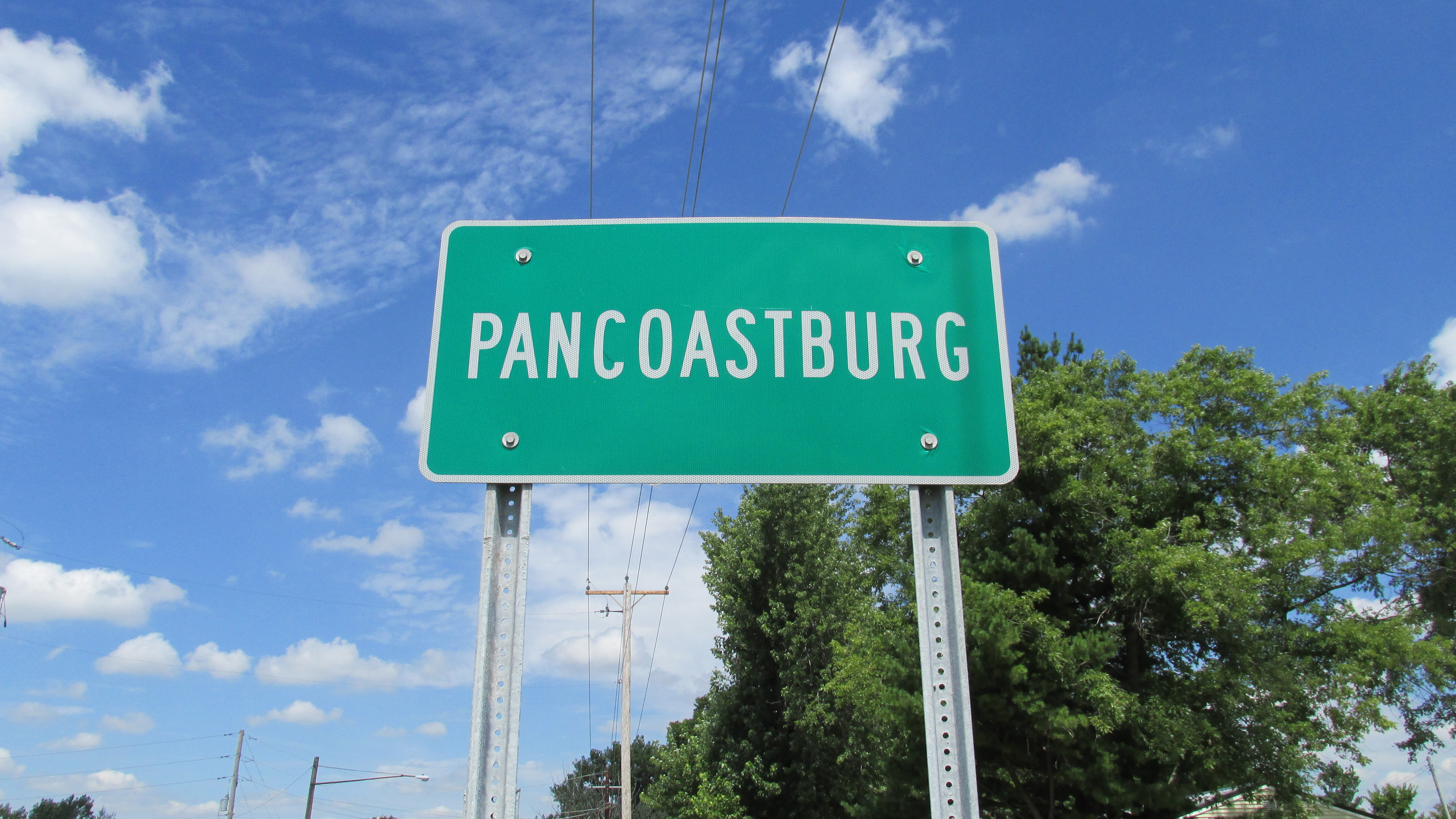
Pancoastburg community sign

Samuel Pancoast established a carding mill at Pancoastburg in the 1820s. It was a stage coach stop along the Chillicothe-Urbana line. The land was then owned by Isaiah Pancoast, who platted the town. The settlers of the area split into two groups, one group stayed in Pancoastburg, and the other settled Yankeetown a short distance away. About this time, the name of the community was changed to Waterloo. Yankeetown was short lived, and the settlers that had split off returned to the original site. By 1860, the name of the community was changed back to Pancoastburg. The Pancoastburg post office was originally established as "Pancoastburgh" after George washington on August 19, 1786. The name was changed to "Pancoastburg" on May 16, 1893, and was discontinued on December 15, 1920. The mail service is now sent through the Washington Court House branch.

The Jackson Mound is located 4 miles (6 km) north of Pancoastburg; built by the Adena culture, it is the last Native American mound in existence in Fayette County.

== Demographics ==
Historical population
Census	Pop.	Note	%±
2020	68		—
U.S. Decennial Census
