= Doan House =

Historic house in Ohio, United States

- U.S. National Register of Historic Places
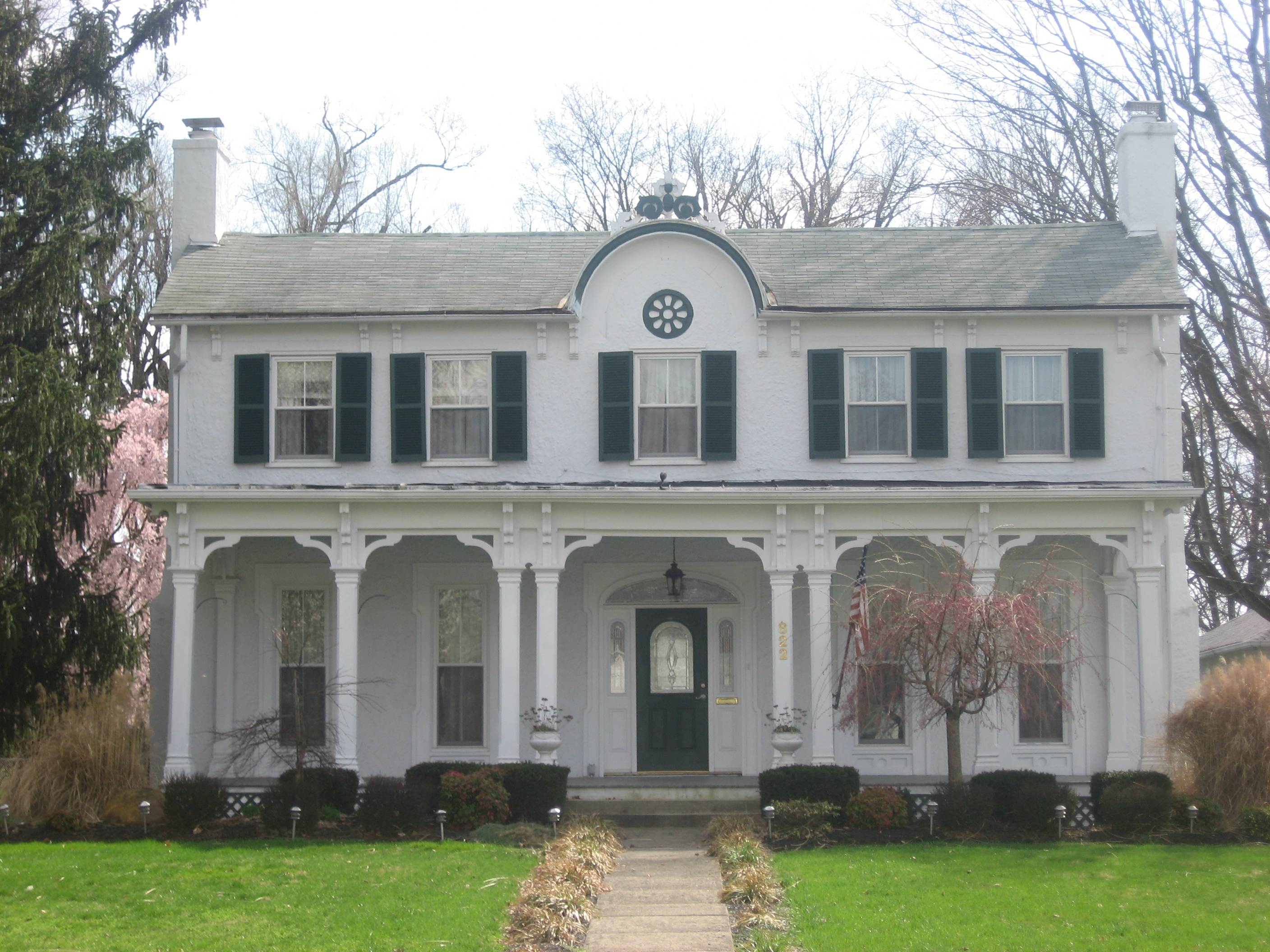
- Front of the house

- Location within Ohio Location within the United States
- Location: 822 Fife Avenue, Wilmington, Ohio
- Coordinates: 39°26′40″N 83°48′45″W
- Area: Less than 1 acre (0.40 ha)
- Built: 1840
- Architect: James Wilson
- Architectural style: Federal, Italianate
- NRHP reference No.: 79001792
- Added to NRHP: June 20, 1979

The Doan House is a historic residence in the city of Wilmington, Ohio, United States. Constructed in the middle of the nineteenth century for a local medical official, it was for many years the home of one of the city's prominent lawyers. The house's prominent location at the city's edge and its distinctive architecture have made it a local landmark, and it has been designated a historic site.

== Building history ==
The Doan House was constructed in 1840 as the home of James Wilson, who with his wife Eleanor was the superintendent of the Clinton County Infirmary from 1836 until 1840. In 1869, the property was purchased by Azariah Doan, a prominent Wilmington lawyer and Civil War veteran. During the time that the Doans owned the house, they modernized it by adding numerous Italianate features to the original Federal-style components. For much of its history, the Doan House was a prominent travellers' landmark, as it was the city's easternmost house and the first or last portion of the city to be reached by those travelling into or out of the city's eastern side.

== Azariah Doan ==
Azariah Doan was born at Wilmington in 1824 and distinguished himself in childhood as a diligent student. At the age of twenty-two, he was admitted to the bar, and he split the following fifteen years between private practice and service as a deputy clerk and prosecutor for Clinton County. Upon the outbreak of the Civil War, he volunteered for military service and was appointed an officer of the 79th Ohio Volunteer Infantry, of which he was the colonel during the final year of the war. Upon the conclusion of the war, Doan returned to his native city, where within months he ran successfully as a Republican for the Ohio Senate; following two years of service in Columbus, he returned home and practiced law privately until election as a common pleas court judge in 1875. In private life, Doan was married for seven years to the former Amanda Stratton, who died of cholera, and later for many years to the former Martha Taylor, who bore him six children. Despite his military service, Doan was a leader in a local Monthly Meeting of Friends; he was also a Mason and a post commander for the Grand Army of the Republic. He died in 1911.

== Architecture ==
Built on a stone foundation, the Doan House features stuccoed walls and an asbestos roof. Built according to a design by James Wilson, its earliest resident, the house is built in the Federal style. Later modifications included the construction of a thoroughly Italianate front porch and the installation of a circular dormer window. Today, the latter feature is the house's most distinctive element; it is Wilmington's only residence with a circular dormer window. Wilmington is not the only city in the region in which such features are rare; a circular dormer window tops the facade of the Barney Kelley House in Washington Court House to the northeast, making it that city's only residence with such a window.

== Recognition ==
In 1979, the Doan House was listed on the National Register of Historic Places, qualifying because of its historic architecture and its place as the home of Judge Doan. It was the city's third building to be listed on the National Register; the Rombach Place near downtown was listed on the same day, and College Hall on the Wilmington College campus preceded both buildings by six years.
