= Rawlings-Brownell House =

- U.S. National Register of Historic Places
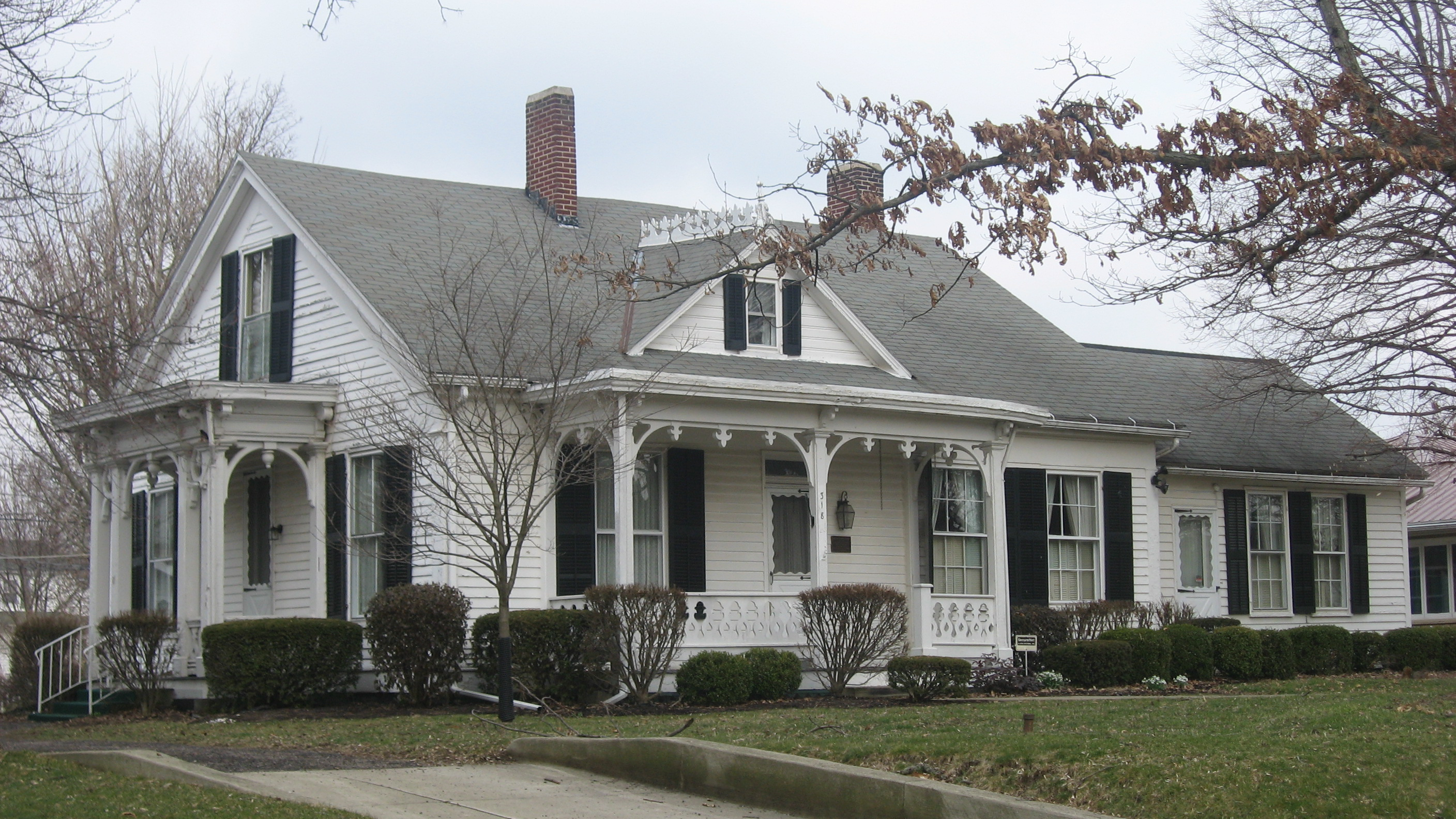
- Front of the house

- Location within Ohio Location within the United States
- Location: 318 Rawlings St., Washington Court House
- Coordinates: 39°32′29″N 83°26′29″W
- Area: Less than 1 acre (0.40 ha)
- Built: 1851
- Architectural style: Greek Revival, Italianate
- NRHP reference No.: 88000207
- Added to NRHP: March 10, 1988

The Rawlings-Brownell House is a historic residence on the northern side of Washington Court House, Ohio, United States. Built during the middle of the nineteenth century, it was home to the man who established the neighborhood in which it is located, and it was later the home of a leading merchant. Although constructed in one architectural style, it was later partially converted into another style, becoming a good example of changes in the community's architectural tastes. It has been designated a historic site.

== Early residents ==
Comparatively little is known about Moses V. Rawlings. He bought property beyond the village's northern boundary in 1850, built the present house in the following year, and subdivided his farm in 1858; today, the house lies on Rawlings Street. Record of an M.V. Rawlings appears in an 1881 history of Fayette County; it notes that a man by this name headed the local Political Hornet newspaper in the 1830s, and an M.V. Rawlings was a Washington Court House city trustee in 1850, but the county history does not discuss whether the land purchaser of 1850 were the same as or different from the newspaper editor or the city official.

Charles Henry Brownell, who purchased the present house from Rawlings in 1867, is better attested than he. Born and raised in Chautauqua County, New York, Brownell settled in Washington Court House in 1866 and at once became interested in the buying and selling of eggs and poultry. Before long, he and his brother began a partnership that continued until the brother's death in 1892; from 1872 until 1882, they were engaged in the retail grocery business, but their poultry business grew so fast that they chose to specialize in it while leaving the grocery business. By 1914, the business had grown to be one of the largest of its kind in a wide region of the state.

== Architecture ==
The Rawlings-Brownell House is a weatherboarded structure with a foundation of sandstone, an asbestos roof, and miscellaneous elements of brick and wood. Its architecture features a mix of the Greek Revival and Italianate architectural styles: upon construction, it was clearly an example of the Greek style, but later modifications plainly lent it Italianate influence. By the late nineteenth century, Greek Revival was seen as outdated, and Italianate was a contemporary style; because it contains elements of both styles, the Rawlings-Brownell House is an important example of transitions in architectural styles during the latter part of the century.

== Preservation ==
In 1988, the Rawlings-Brownell House was listed on the National Register of Historic Places, qualifying both because of its architecture and because of its association with a prominent person. Crucial to this designation was its status as a well-preserved example of transition between different architectural styles, while its place as Brownell's home was deemed more significant than its place as Rawlings' home. It is one of several Italianate properties in Washington Court House on the Register, but others, such as the Barney Kelley and Jacob Light Houses, are purely examples of the style instead of featuring a mix of styles.
