= Fayette County Airport =

Fayette County Airport may refer to:

- Fayette County Airport (Ohio) in Washington Court House, Ohio, United States
- Fayette County Airport (Tennessee) in Somerville, Tennessee, United States

== See also ==
- Fayetteville Municipal Airport (disambiguation)
