= Washington Cemetery =

Washington Cemetery may refer to:

- Washington Cemetery (Brooklyn)
- Washington Cemetery (Washington Court House, Ohio)
