= Mills Gardner =

American politician

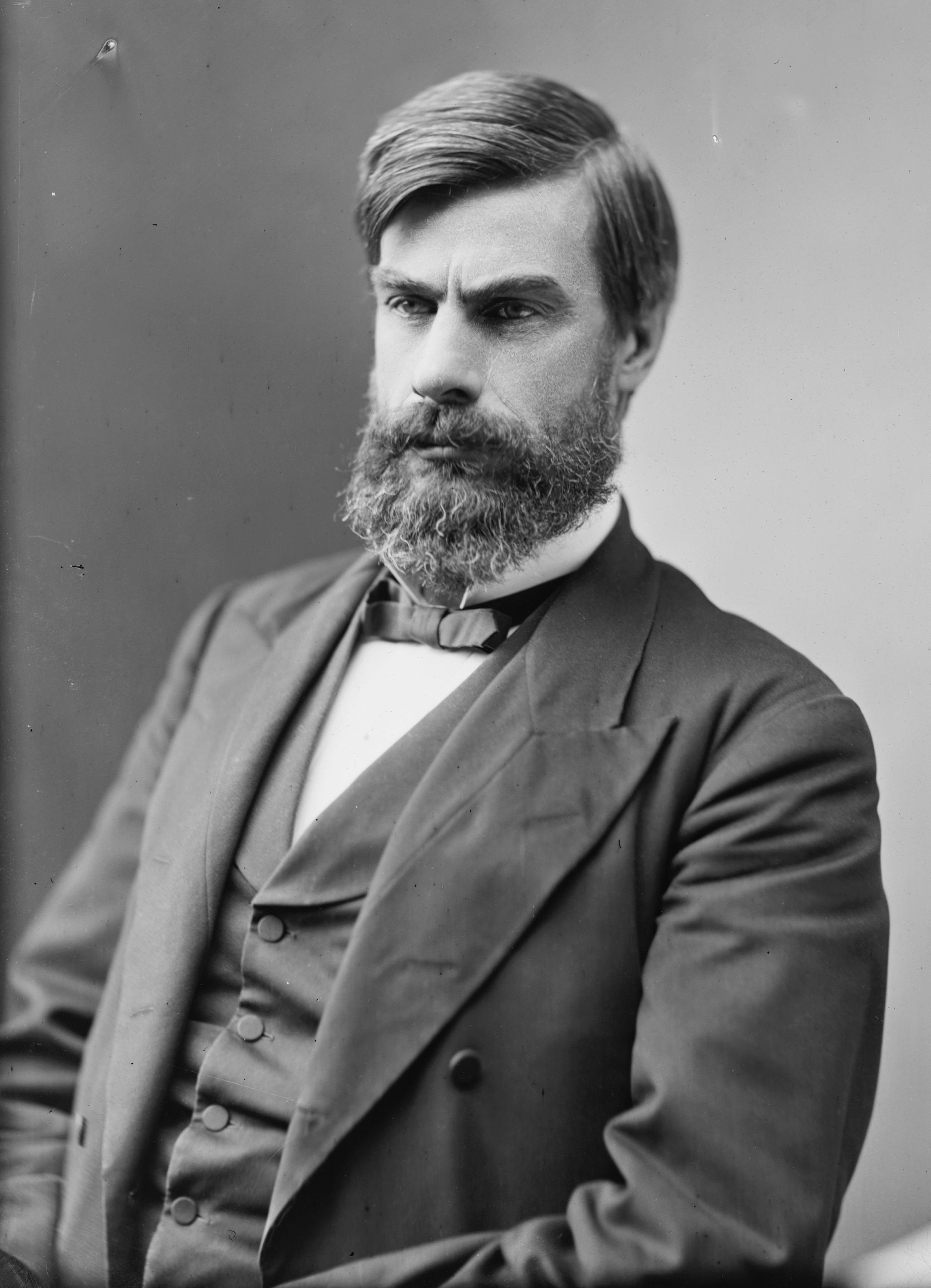

Member of the U.S. House of Representatives from Ohio's 3rd district
- In office March 4, 1877 – March 3, 1879
- Preceded by: John S. Savage
- Succeeded by: John A. McMahon

Member of the Ohio Senate from the 5th district
- In office January 6, 1862 – January 3, 1864
- Preceded by: John Quincy Smith
- Succeeded by: John F. Patton

Member of the Ohio House of Representatives from the Fayette County district
- In office January 1, 1866 – January 5, 1868
- Preceded by: James Pursell
- Succeeded by: Samuel F. Kerr

Personal details
- Born: January 30, 1830 Russellville, Ohio, US
- Died: February 20, 1910 (aged 80) Washington Court House, Ohio, US
- Resting place: Washington Cemetery, Washington Court House, Ohio
- Party: Republican
- Profession: Lawyer
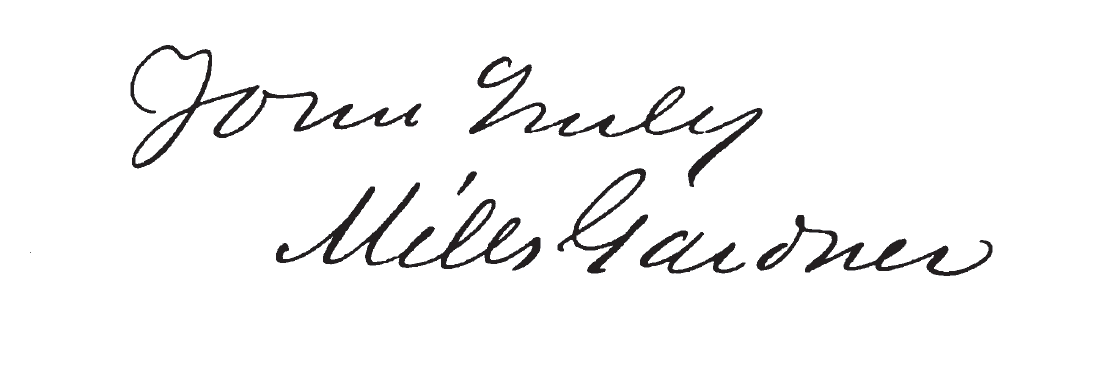
- Signature

Mills Gardner (January 30, 1830 – February 20, 1910) was an attorney, politician and member of the United States House of Representatives from Ohio from 1877 to 1879.

== Biography ==
Mills Gardner was born in Russellville, Ohio, the son of Seth Gardner, a captain in the War of 1812. He attended the public schools of Highland County, Ohio and Rankins academy at Ripley, Ohio. He clerked in a dry goods store for some years while reading the law with his uncle Judge Nelson Barrere of Hillsboro, Ohio who was the last Whig candidate for governor of Ohio. He relocated to Fayette County, Ohio in 1854 and was admitted to the bar in 1855, locating at Washington Court House, Ohio where he built up a large practice. He was prosecuting attorney of Fayette county for two terms (1855–1859).

Gardner was an original Republican, casting his first vote for John C. Fremont in 1856 and for every nominee of the Republican party for president after that until his death. He was elected on the Republican ticket to the Ohio Senate in 1861. In the re-election of Abraham Lincoln in 1864, Gardner was a presidential elector for Ohio.

During the Civil War, when the life of the Republican party and nation was at stake, Mills Gardner took an active and prominent part in rallying public opinion in behalf of the Union, and in exposing the opponents of the national administration, in particular Clement Vallandigham.

In 1865, Mills Gardner was elected to the Ohio House of Representatives. In 1872 he was elected a member of the Ohio constitutional convention.

He was elected to the Forty-fifth congress in 1876 from Ohio's Third district. He declined renomination in 1878 for a second term.

While a public servant, Mills Gardner nevertheless owned land in Washington Court House; in 1875, he sold a new city resident the south-side lot upon which the Jacob Light House was later constructed. Upon leaving office, he resumed the practice of law until his death at Washington Court House. He is interred there in Washington Cemetery.

== Sources ==
- United States Congress. "Mills Gardner (id: G000059)". Biographical Directory of the United States Congress.
- Taylor, William A. Ohio in Congress from 1803 to 1901. Columbus, Ohio: The XX Century Publishing Company, 1901.
- History of the Republican Party in Ohio. Chicago: Lewis Publishing Co., 1898, 1579 pgs.

U.S. House of Representatives
Preceded by John S. Savage	Member of the U.S. House of Representatives from Ohio's 3rd congressional district 1877–1879	Succeeded by John A. McMahon
