= Washington High School (Washington Court House, Ohio) =

School in Washington Court House, Ohio, US

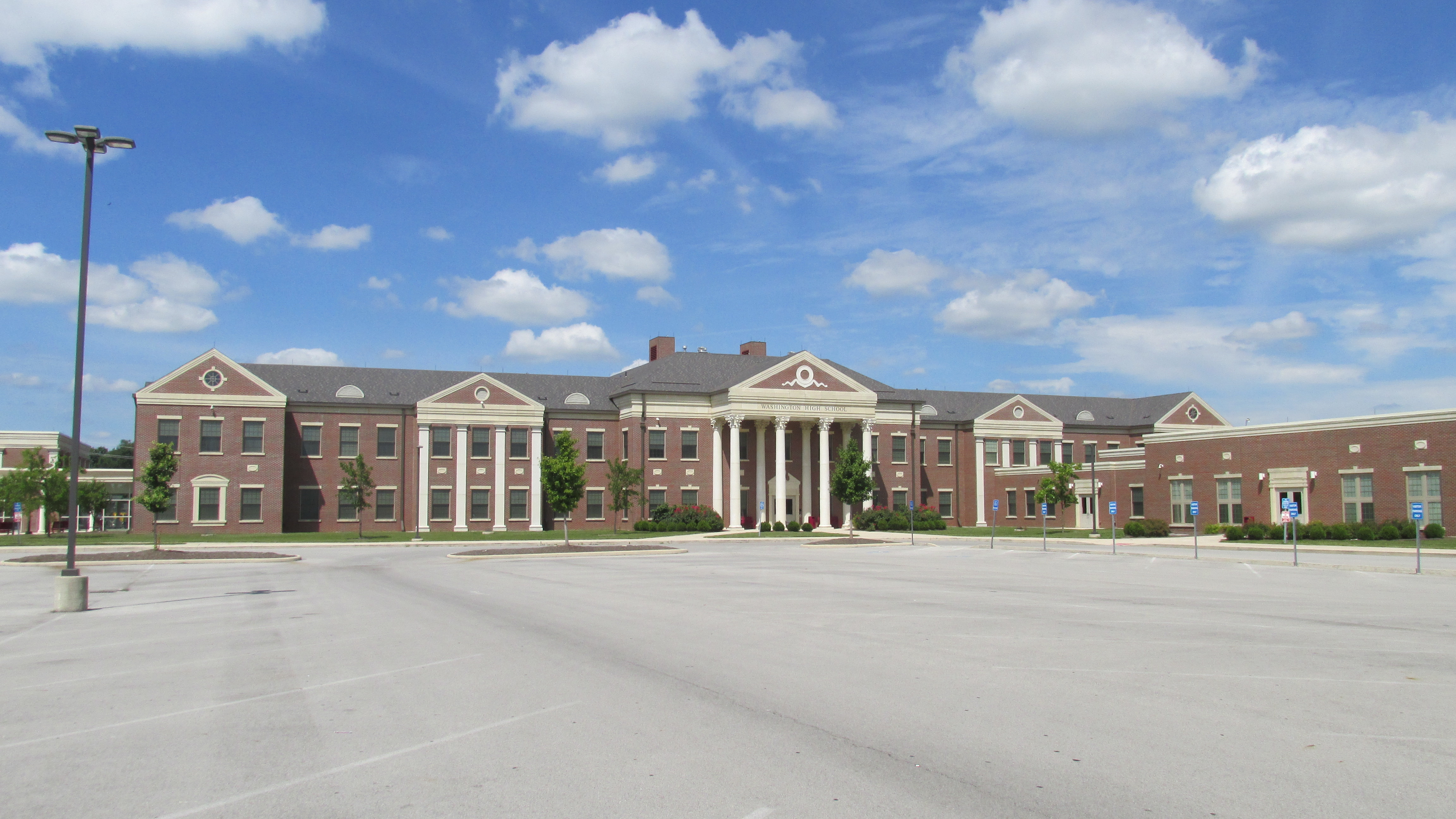
- Washington Court House High School

Location
- 400 South Elm Street; Washington Court House, (Fayette County), Ohio 43160; United States; 39°32′35″N 83°25′25″W

Information
- Type: Public, Coeducational high school
- Motto: Engage, Inspire, Grow
- School district: Washington Court House City School District
- Superintendent: Chris Briggs
- Principal: Brady Streitenberger
- Teaching staff: 29.50 (FTE)
- Grades: 9–12
- Enrollment: 605 (2023–2024)
- Student to teacher ratio: 20.51
- Colors: Royal Blue and White
- Fight song: Go Washington
- Athletics conference: Frontier Athletic Conference
- Mascot: Blue Lion
- Team name: Blue Lions
- Rival: Miami Trace
- Accreditation: North Central Association of Colleges and Schools
- Yearbook: Sunburst
- Website: whs.wchcs.org

Washington High School, also known as Washington Court House High School, is a public high school located in Washington Court House, Fayette County, Ohio, United States.

The former high school was located on Willard Street on the eastern side of town. Originally, the current middle school was the town's high school, but in the district's late 1960s expansion, the current high school was built. Only one high school exists in the Washington Court House City School District.

Washington Senior High has approximately 50 staff members and approximately 600 students in grades 9–12.

== Athletics ==
- Boys Baseball – 2000

== Notable alumni ==
- Travis Shaw, baseball player
- Jeff Shaw, baseball player
