= Fayette Christian School =

Location
- 1315 Dayton Ave. Washington Court House, (Fayette County), Ohio 43160; United States; 39°32′23″N 83°27′37″W

Information
- Type: Private Christian
- Established: 1974
- Principal: Don Hutchins
- Grades: Pre-School-12th
- Colors: Green Black and White
- Athletics: Boys' and Girls' Basketball, Coed Soccer, Girls' Volleyball
- Athletics conference: Southern Ohio Christian Conference
- Mascot: Crusaders
- Team name: Crusaders
- Accreditation: AACS
- Yearbook: Sword and Shield
- Tuition: See website
- Programs: Athletics, Drama, and Music
- Athletic Dir.: Mark Richmond
- Contact: 740-335-7262
- Website: www.fayettechristian.org

Fayette Christian School (FCS) is a private Christian school in Washington Court House, Ohio, for students in preschool through 12th grade. FCS serves Washington Court House, Jeffersonville, and surrounding areas. It is the only Christian school among the three school systems in Fayette County.

Their mascot is the Crusaders. School colors are hunter green, black, and white. FCS holds an annual golf outing as a fundraiser.

== History ==
Fayette Christian School was established in the fall of 1974 as a ministry of the Fayette Bible Church in Washington Court House, Ohio.

== Affiliations ==
Fayette Christian athletics is a member of the Southern Ohio Christian Conference and participates in annual athletic tournaments that the conference sponsors. Fayette Christian is a former member of the Buckeye Christian School Organization but is no longer associated with that organization.

== Extracurricular activities ==
Fayette Christian School offers a variety of sports for junior and senior high students including, volleyball, soccer, and basketball, It also offers elementary soccer each fall and elementary basketball in the winter.

The Drama department at FCS presents a play each spring as well as programs in December and May put on by the Kindergarten class, Elementary School and High School.

The Music department offers choir as well as orchestra including brass, woodwinds, percussion and stringed instruments.
