= Morris Sharp House =

- U.S. National Register of Historic Places
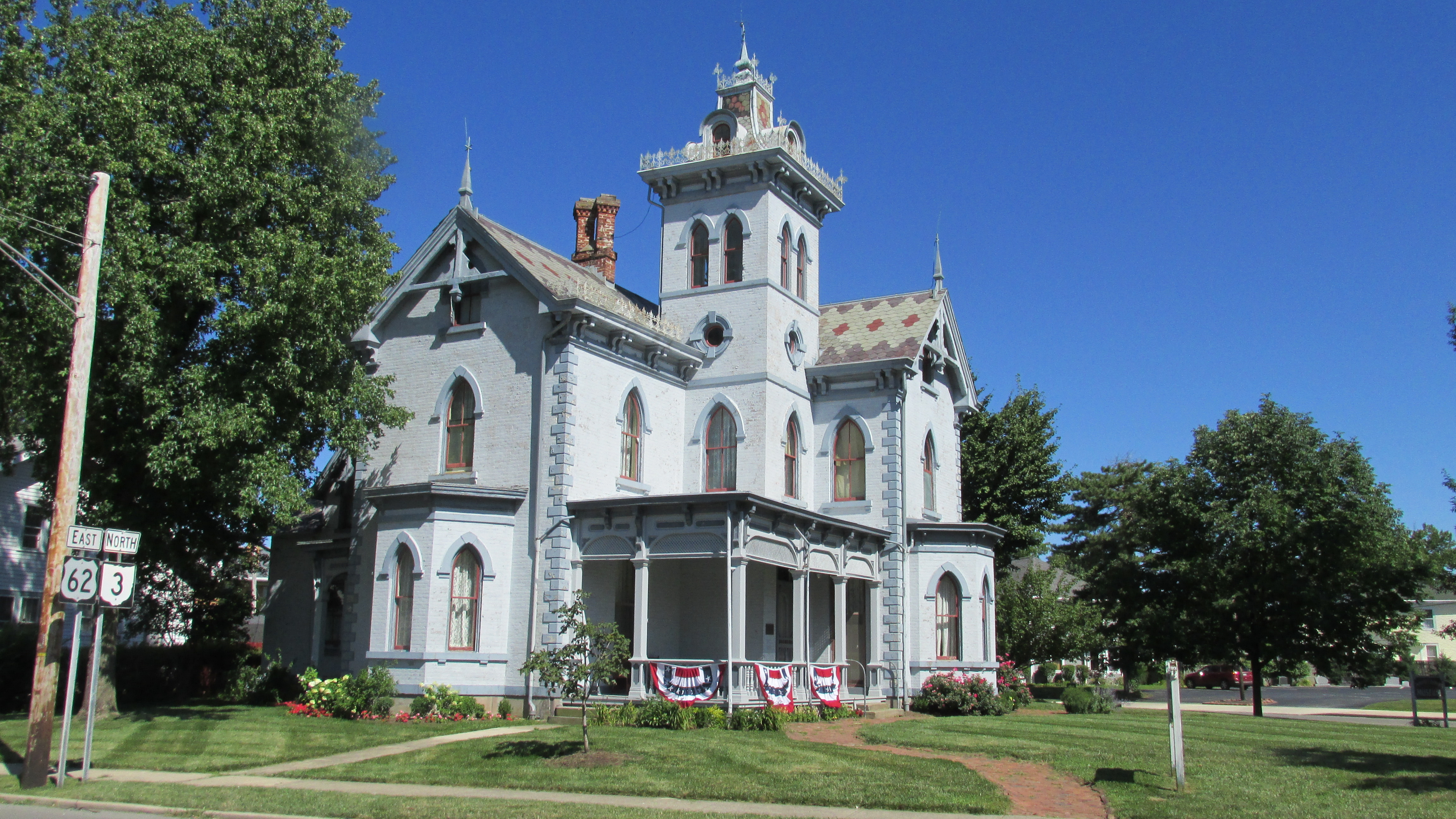
- Front and side of the house

- Location within Ohio Location within the United States
- Location: 517 Columbus St., Washington Court House, Ohio
- Coordinates: 39°32′21″N 83°26′6″W
- Area: 2 acres (0.81 ha)
- Built: 1875
- Architectural style: Italianate
- NRHP reference No.: 74001483
- Added to NRHP: January 21, 1974

The Morris Sharp House is a historic residence in the city of Washington Court House, Ohio, United States. Built to be the home of one of the city's leading citizens, it has remained the architectural landmark that it was designed to be. The house has served as a museum for nearly fifty years, and it has been designated a historic site.

== Morris Sharp ==
Morris Sharp was born at Aberdeen, Ohio on 30 August 1838 and with his family he moved to Jamestown in 1851 before settling in Washington Court House. He joined his father in the family business after completing his education, but after his health failed him, he was compelled to change his vocation, and upon the formation of the Merchants and Farmers Bank in early 1872, Sharp was appointed the bank's first cashier. He rapidly became one of the foremost citizens of his adopted city because of his unusual business ability, and until his death in early 1905, he was actively engaged in the management of extensive banking interests and extensive agricultural tracts. A member of the local Methodist church, Sharp was a leading advocate of the prohibitionist cause; he was once the Prohibition Party's candidate for Governor of Ohio.

== Architecture ==
Constructed in 1875, the Sharp House is a brick building with a stone foundation, a slate roof, and elements of wood and stone. Two stories tall, the house is a clear example of the Italianate style. Its design comprises two wings that join at the base of a tower at the house's enter; the interior is divided into fourteen rooms, including one on the third story of the tower, which can be reached by ascending a spiral staircase. With its tower, the house is one of the city's tallest buildings; the only ones that surpass it are the courthouse and St. Colman's Catholic Church. Its prominence is further enhanced by its location at a major intersection; Washington and Columbus Avenues at the house. A grand design was Sharp's goal upon the house's construction; he reportedly claimed that he hoped for a house that would be "the showplace of Washington Court House".

== Preservation ==
In 1958, the Fayette County Historical Society purchased the Morris Sharp House, and seven years later the property was reopened as the Fayette County Museum. It remains in use as a museum to the present; among its exhibits are historic furniture, documents, clothes, and weapons. The house gained further recognition in 1974, when it and an outbuilding were listed together on the National Register of Historic Places for their architectural significance. One of more than a dozen National Register properties in and around Washington Court House, it was one of the first to join the list; only the Fayette County Courthouse achieved this distinction sooner.
