= Fayetteville Municipal Airport =

Fayetteville Municipal Airport may refer to:

- Fayetteville Municipal Airport (Arkansas), also known as Drake Field, in Fayetteville, Arkansas, United States (FAA: FYV)
- Fayetteville Municipal Airport (North Carolina), now known as Fayetteville Regional Airport, in Fayetteville, North Carolina, United States (FAA: FAY)
- Fayetteville Municipal Airport (Tennessee) in Fayetteville, Tennessee, United States (FAA: FYM)

== See also ==
- Fayette County Airport (disambiguation)
