= Washington Court House City School District =

School district in Ohio, United States

Address
- 306 Highland Avenue Washington Court House, Ohio, 43160; United States
- Coordinates: 39°31′50″N 83°26′34″W

District information
- Type: Public
- Grades: PK–12
- Schools: 4
- NCES District ID: 3910011

Students and staff
- Students: 1,825 (2025–2026)
- Teachers: 108.32 (on an FTE basis) (2025–2026)
- Staff: 210.39 (on an FTE basis) (2025–2026)
- Student–teacher ratio: 16.85 (2025–2026)

Other information
- Website: www.wchcs.org

The Washington Court House City School District is a public school district serving Washington Court House, Ohio and surrounding areas. The district enrolls most school-age children within the city limits of Washington Court House.

Presently, operating school buildings include:

- Belle Aire intermediate
- Cherry Hill primary
- Washington Middle School
- Washington High School

The district also operates a combination administrative office and school bus garage. Cherry Hill houses pre-k to 2nd grade. Belle Aire houses 3-5 grades while grades 6-8 take place at the Middle School. Washington High School consists of students in grades nine through twelve.

The superintendent in Chris Briggs.
