= John S. Savage =

American politician (1841–1884)

Member of the U.S. House of Representatives from Ohio's 3rd district
- In office March 4, 1875 – March 3, 1877
- Preceded by: John Quincy Smith
- Succeeded by: Mills Gardner

Personal details
- Born: John Simpson Savage; October 30, 1841 Clermont County, Ohio, US
- Died: November 24, 1884 (aged 43) Wilmington, Ohio, US
- Resting place: Sugar Grove Cemetery
- Party: Democratic
- Spouse: Lydia Ayres
- Children: four

John Simpson Savage (October 30, 1841 – November 24, 1884) was an Ohio school teacher, attorney, and member of the United States House of Representatives for one term from 1875 to 1877.

== Early life and career ==
John S. Savage was born in Clermont County, Ohio, to James and Frances (Battson) Savage. James Savage was a school teacher and later a farmer. John was educated in the local public schools and in 1853 relocated to Clinton County, Ohio, where he took up his father’s early vocation.

During his five years of teaching, he devoted his spare time to the study of law and, in 1865, he was admitted to the Ohio bar. That same year he was also admitted to practice in the Supreme Court of Illinois. Savage opened a law office at Wilmington, Ohio, in partnership with Simeon G. Smith. Their firm, Savage & Smith, was well known in the county.

=== Family life ===
On December 31, 1868 Savage married Lydia Ayers, a native of Clinton county; they had four children.

== Congress ==
Savage was a Democrat, casting his first vote for George B. McClellan in 1864. His election to Congress was wholly unsought—he accepted the nomination more to aid in maintaining the organization of his party than in the expectation of being elected. Ohio's third congressional district was overwhelmingly Republican, yet Savage defeated his incumbent opponent John Q. Smith by 1,162 votes. In the next congressional election in 1876, he was narrowly defeated by Mills Gardner, who also served a single term.

== Later life ==
Savage resumed the practicing law in Wilmington. He was a Freemason, of the Knights Templar degree.

=== Death and burial ===
He died in Wilmington and his remains are interred at the Sugar Grove Cemetery.

== Sources ==
- United States Congress. "John S. Savage (id: S000084)". Biographical Directory of the United States Congress.
- History of Clinton County, Ohio. Chicago: W. H. Beers & Co., 1882.
- Taylor, William A. Ohio in Congress from 1803 to 1901. Columbus, Ohio: The XX Century Publishing Company, 1901.

U.S. House of Representatives
Preceded by John Quincy Smith	U.S. Representative from Ohio's 3rd district 1875 - 1877	Succeeded by Mills Gardner
