= John Quincy Smith =

American farmer, politician and legislator

John Q. Smith
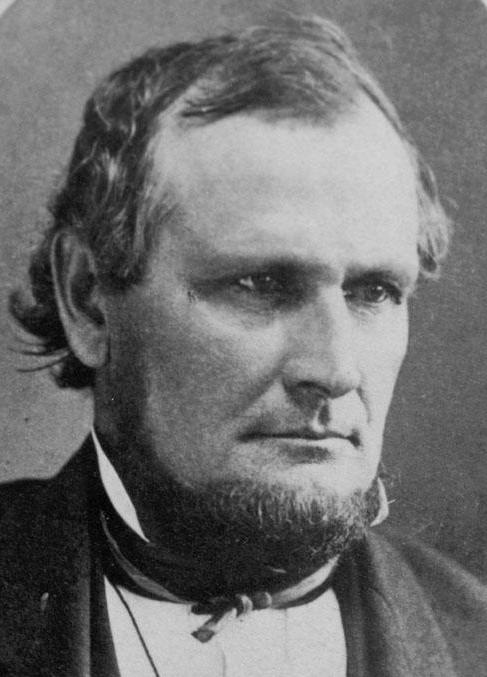

19th Commissioner of Indian Affairs
- In office November 12, 1875 – September 27, 1877
- President: Ulysses S. Grant; Rutherford B. Hayes
- Preceded by: Edward Parmelee Smith
- Succeeded by: Ezra A. Hayt

Member of the U.S. House of Representatives from Ohio's 3rd district
- In office March 4, 1873 – March 3, 1875
- Preceded by: Lewis D. Campbell
- Succeeded by: John S. Savage

Member of the Ohio Senate from the 5th district
- In office January 2, 1860 – January 5, 1862
- Preceded by: James J. Winans
- Succeeded by: Mills Gardner
- In office January 1, 1872 – January 4, 1874
- Preceded by: Moses D. Gatch
- Succeeded by: Samuel N. Yeoman

Member of the Ohio House of Representatives from the Clinton County district
- In office January 6, 1862 – January 3, 1864
- Preceded by: Bebee Truesdale
- Succeeded by: Stephen Evans

Personal details
- Born: John Quincy Smith; November 5, 1824 Waynesville, Ohio
- Died: December 30, 1901 (aged 77) Clinton County, Ohio
- Resting place: Miami Cemetery, Waynesville
- Party: Republican; Democratic
- Spouse: Lydia Emeline Evans
- Children: 6
- Education: Miami University

John Quincy Smith (November 5, 1824 – December 30, 1901) was an American farmer, politician and legislator from Ohio. He served in the United States House of Representatives for one term from 1873 to 1875, as well as federal commissioner of Indian Affairs from 1875 through 1877. Prior to this, he served in both the Ohio Senate and Ohio House of Representatives.

== Early life and career ==
John Q. Smith was born to Thomas Edward Smith (1783–1841) and Mary Kennedy Whitehill (1788–1849), natives of Virginia, on their Warren County, Ohio, farm near Waynesville. A voracious reader, his early schooling was limited because of his duties on the family farm, but his father believed in the advantages of an education, so that John Quincy was able to spend a short time at Miami University.

In July 1852, Smith married Lydia Emeline Evans, a native of Warren county. They had six children, one of whom died in childhood. In 1854, he relocated his young family to Clinton County, Ohio.

== Political career ==
He was elected to the Ohio Senate in 1859 as a Republican. In Columbus, during the legislative sessions, Smith's roommate was James A. Garfield, who was just starting out on his public career, and other intimate acquaintances were John Sherman and Ulysses S. Grant. In 1861, he was elected to the Ohio House of Representatives and served two years. In 1870, he was elected as a member of the Ohio State Board of Equalization. He was again elected State Senator in 1871.

=== Congress ===
In 1872, Smith was elected to Congress from Ohio's Third Congressional District. In 1874, he was renominated for Congress, but defeated by John S. Savage.

=== Federal roles ===
Smith was appointed Commissioner of Indian Affairs in the Grant Administration on December 11, 1875. His administration saw several controversies, including the Great Sioux War of 1876-77 (including the Battle of the Little Bighorn), the removal of the Ponca Indians to Indian Territory and charges of corruption against his chief clerk, Samuel Galpin. He was removed from office on September 27, 1877.

President Rutherford B. Hayes appointed Smith as United States consul general to Montreal, Quebec, Canada, serving from 1878 until he resigned in 1882.

== Later career ==
He remained an ardent Republican until President Grover Cleveland's first administration, when he allied himself with the Democratic party because of his views on tariff reform. He thereafter remained a Democrat. His published articles on tariff in the New York Evening Post attracted wide attention throughout the country and were extensively quoted by the press and on the stump.

=== Death and burial ===
Smith left public life and retired to his farm, "Sycamores", in Oakland where he died. He is buried in Miami Cemetery, Waynesville, Ohio.

== Sources ==
- United States Congress. "John Quincy Smith (id: S000574)". Biographical Directory of the United States Congress.
- Taylor, William A. Ohio in Congress from 1803 to 1901. Columbus, Ohio: The XX Century Publishing Company, 1901.
- History of Clinton County, Ohio. Chicago: W. H. Beers & Co., 1882.
- Poore, Benjamin Perley (1878). The political register and congressional directory: a statistical record of the Federal Officials...1776-1878. Boston: Houghton, Osgood and Company. p. 235.

U.S. House of Representatives
Preceded by Lewis D. Campbell	Member of the U.S. House of Representatives from Ohio's 3rd congressional district 1873 - 1875	Succeeded by John S. Savage
