= William Burnett House =

- U.S. National Register of Historic Places
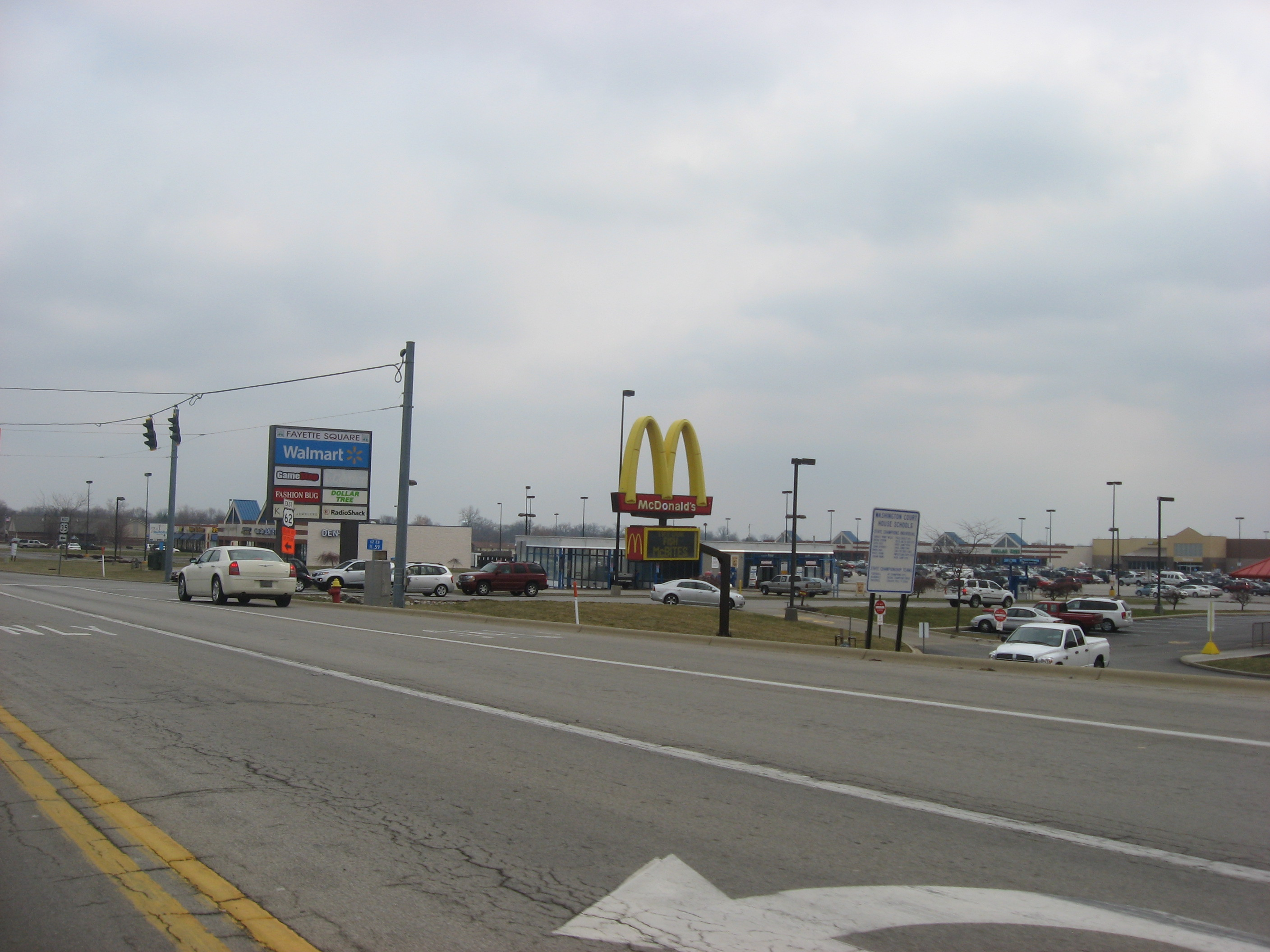
- Site of the house, now occupied by a shopping center

- Location within Ohio Location within the United States
- Location: 1613 U.S. Route 62 SW., Washington Court House, Ohio
- Coordinates: 39°31′28″N 83°27′30″W
- Area: 1.9 acres (0.77 ha)
- Built: 1869
- Architectural style: Greek Revival, Italianate, I-house
- NRHP reference No.: 89000176
- Added to NRHP: March 22, 1989

The William Burnett House was a historic farmhouse located near the city of Washington Court House in Fayette County, Ohio, United States. Constructed in the nineteenth century, it was once a masterpiece of multiple architectural styles, and it was designated a historic site because of its architectural distinction.

== Burnett ==
William Burnett was a prominent Union Township resident in the middle of the 19th century: an 1850 publication recorded him as serving as a constable for the township and as a marshal for the village of Washington Court House. Six years later, he was elected to a five-year term as the county sheriff for Fayette County. In addition to his law enforcement duties, Burnett operated a farm on the Leesburg Road southwest of Washington Courthouse; here he built a new house in 1869.

== Architecture ==
Burnett's house was built with brick walls and foundation, a metal roof, and elements of wood. Five bays wide, it featured an unusual combination of architectural styles: the basic floor plan was that of an I-house, but unlike most I-houses, it was constructed with high-style features common to the Greek Revival and Italianate styles of architecture. Some of the most prominent components of the house's design were the pairs of brackets placed above the hooded windows to support the large cornice; these Italianate elements were supplemented by Greek pieces such as the glass around the main entrance, which featured a lintel, sidelights, and a transom light. Together, the Greek and Italianate elements served to distinguish Burnett's residence from the typical I-house, which was a thoroughly vernacular structure.

== Preservation ==
In early 1989, the Burnett House was listed on the National Register of Historic Places, qualifying because of its historically significant architecture. Despite this designation, the house was destroyed by 2006, but it remains listed on the Register.
