= Robinson-Pavey House =

- U.S. National Register of Historic Places
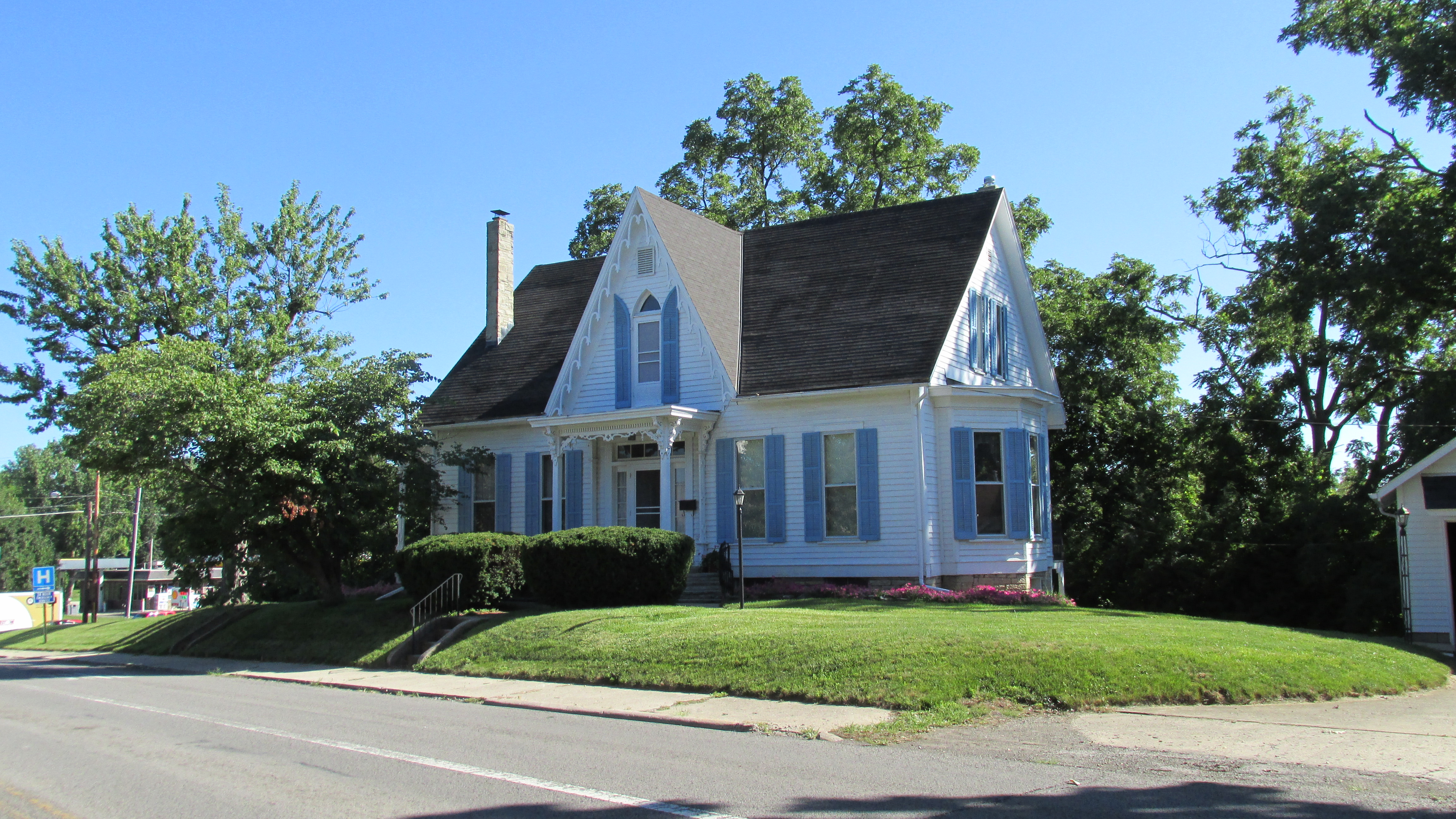
- Front and western end

- Location within Ohio Location within the United States
- Location: 421 W. Court St., Washington Court House, Ohio
- Coordinates: 39°31′57″N 83°26′39″W
- Area: Less than 1 acre (0.40 ha)
- Built: 1850
- Architectural style: Carpenter Gothic
- NRHP reference No.: 87000638
- Added to NRHP: April 23, 1987

The Robinson-Pavey House is a historic residence in western Washington Court House, Ohio, United States. Named for its two prominent earliest residents, the house has been named a historic site.

After moving from another locality to Washington Court House, John H. Robinson arranged for the construction of the present house in 1849. Part proprietor of a family-owned textile factory, Robinson was able to occupy the house in the following year. He owned the property until 1861, when he sold it to local attorney Madison Pavey. Besides his law practice, Pavey was locally prominent as one of the founders of the Bank of Fayette.

Built of weatherboarded walls on a foundation of sandstone, the Robinson-Pavey House is covered with an asphalt roof and features elements of wood and iron. Among the prominent architectural elements of this Gothic Revival house are elaborate bargeboards at the ends of its tall gables; the roof is steeply pitched, and the house's shape is broken by a small "side" gable that includes a shutter-covered ogive window over the main entrance. Piercing the walls are two doors, both of which possess small but elaborate hand-carven trim and brackets.

In 1987, the Robinson-Pavey House was listed on the National Register of Historic Places, qualifying because of its distinctive architecture; at the time of designation it was one of just two Gothic Revival houses in the city.

In 2018, the Robinson-Pavey House was scheduled to be demolished to make way for a Sonic restaurant. Local historian Emma Dell White "rescued" the historic house. She purchased two-and-a-half acres at 1733 State Route 41 Southwest, and, with her own money, commissioned the movement of the house from its place on Highland Avenue in town, to the new site to preserve its place in Fayette County history.
