= Jackson Mound =

Archaeological site in Ohio, United States

- U.S. National Register of Historic Places
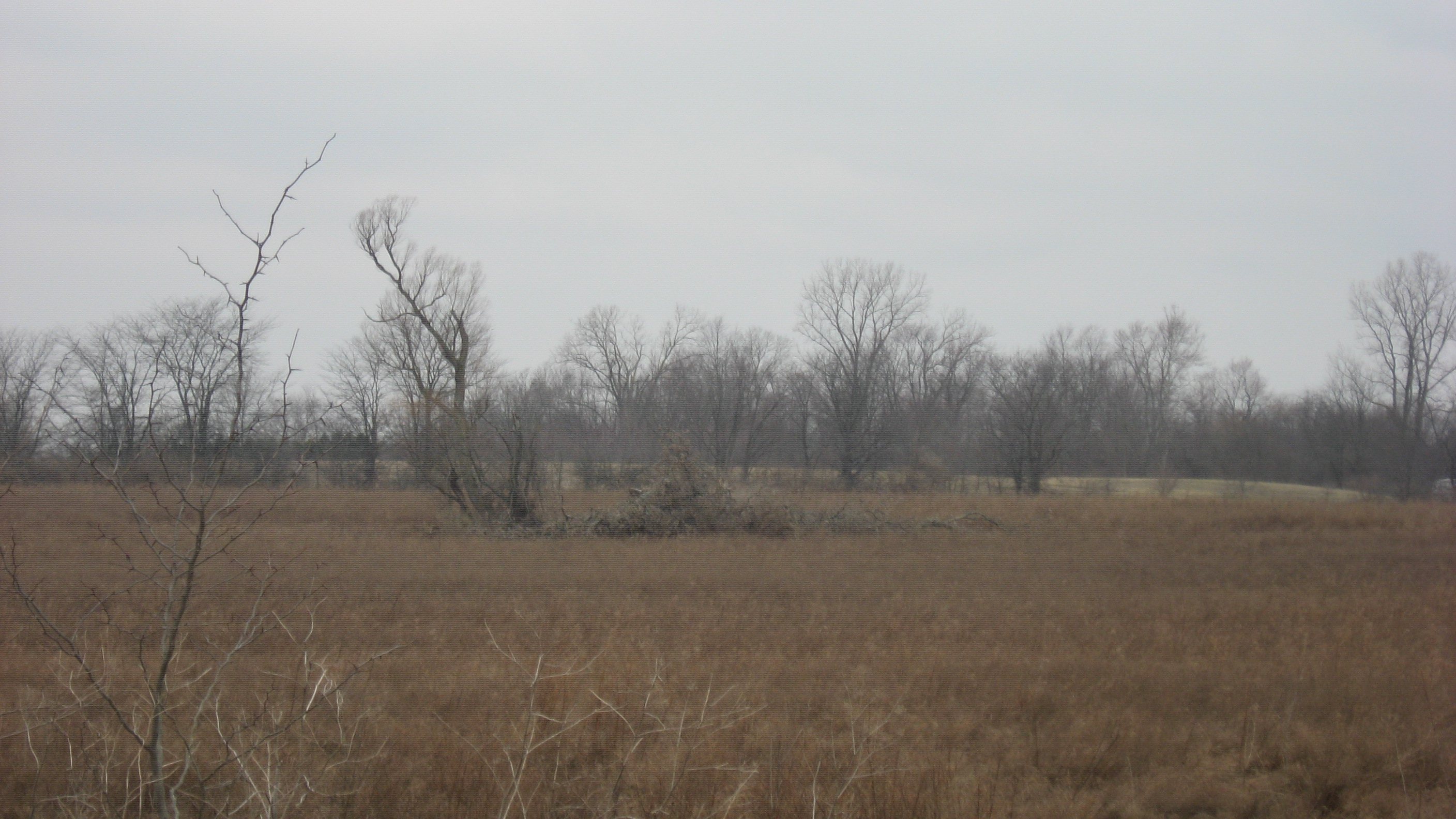
- View from the east

- Location within Ohio Location within the United States
- Location: East of State Route 207, 4 miles (6.4 km) north of Pancoastburg
- Coordinates: 39°40′40″N 83°15′55″W
- Area: Less than 1 acre (0.40 ha)
- NRHP reference No.: 75001397
- Added to NRHP: October 21, 1975

The Jackson Mound is a Native American mound in the south-central portion of the U.S. state of Ohio. Located north of Pancoastburg in Fayette County, it measures approximately 75 feet (23 m) in diameter and 5.5 feet (1.7 m) in height. The mound has never been excavated, making the certain identification of its builders impossible; however, its location on a high terrace above a relatively small stream suggests that it was built by the Adena culture, which favored such sites for its many mounds. If true, it was originally more conical in shape (the mound's location in a farm field has resulted in its being damaged by years of plowing), and it is likely to cover the remains of a wooden charnel house built by the Adena.

An archaeological survey performed in 1914 listed forty-two different mounds in Fayette County, but the Jackson Mound is the only one that has survived to the present day. For this reason, it is a significant archaeological site. In recognition of its archaeological value, it was listed on the National Register of Historic Places in late 1975, being the county's only archaeological site to be accorded this distinction.
