= Fayette County Airport (Ohio) =

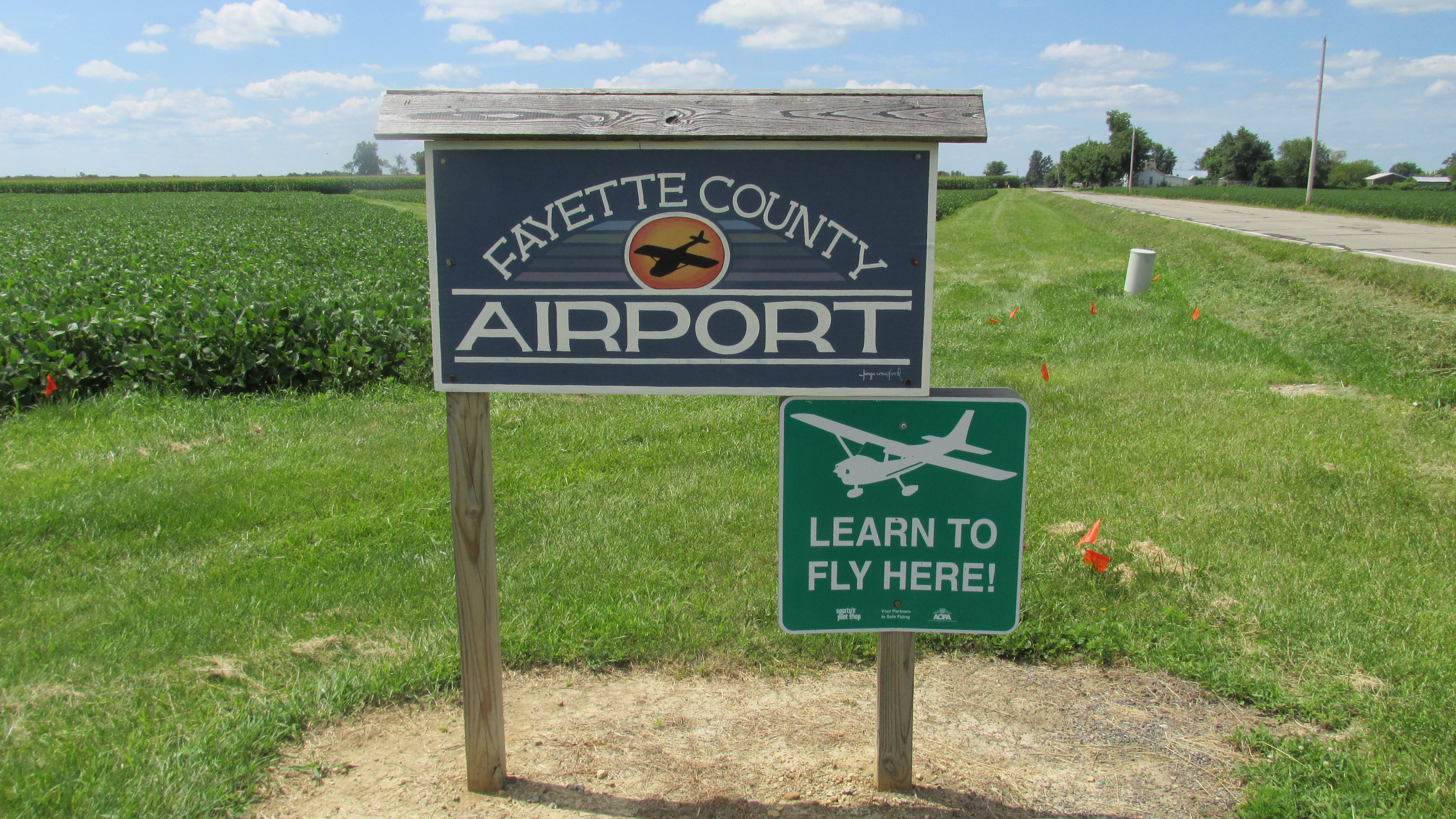
- Entrance sign
- IATA: none; ICAO: none; FAA LID: I23

Summary
- Airport type: Public
- Owner: Fayette County Commissioners
- Serves: Washington Court House, Ohio
- Elevation AMSL: 980 ft (300 m)
- Coordinates: 39°34′13″N 083°25′14″W

Map
- Location of airport in Ohio I23 (the United States)

Runways
Direction	Length		Surface
Direction	ft	m	Surface
5/23	5,097	1,554	Asphalt

Statistics (2021)
- Aircraft operations (year ending 7/20/2021): 29,405
- Based aircraft: 31
- Source: Federal Aviation Administration

Fayette County Airport (FAA LID: I23) is a county-owned, public-use airport located at 2770 State Route 38 two nautical miles (3.7 km) northeast of the central business district of Washington Court House, a city in Fayette County, Ohio, United States. According to the FAA's National Plan of Integrated Airport Systems for 2009–2013, it was classified as a general aviation airport.

The airport hosts regular events such as drone shows and balloon festivals.

== History ==
Ground was broken for the airport on 28 July 1966 and site preparation was complete by August 29th. The airport and its 4,000 ft (1,200 m) runway were dedicated on 23 October 1966. By late March 1970, a 3,600 sq ft (330 m^{2}) maintenance hangar had been built. By early November 1970, a new parallel taxiway had been built.

The runway was extended to 5,100 ft (1,600 m) by the mid-1990s and a new terminal was opened in 2008.

In October 2013, it was announced that MedFlight, a not-for-profit air and ground critical care transportation company based in Columbus, Ohio, would establish a base at the airport. Operations commenced at the airport on December 6, 2013 with MedFlight leasing a hangar from a private party. On May 1, 2014 the helicopter's base relocated to a permanent helipad on Old Route 35, near Octa.

The county began accepting bids to extend the taxiway to the end of the runway in August 2019 as the first phase in a multiple phase project. By 2022, the airport was reconstructing its parallel taxiway. The airport received a federal grant to upgrade its weather equipment in May 2025.

== Facilities and aircraft ==
Fayette County Airport covers an area of 40 acres (16 ha) at an elevation of 980 feet (299 m) above mean sea level. It has one runway designated 5/23 with an asphalt surface measuring 5,097 by 75 feet (1,554 x 23 m).

The airport has a fixed-base operator that sells fuel, both avgas and Jet A. It offers services such as general maintenance and a courtesy car as well as amenities like internet, a conference room, a crew lounge, snooze rooms, a shower, and more.

For the 12-month period ending July 20, 2021, the airport had 29,405 aircraft operations, an average of 81 per day: 97% general aviation, 2% air taxi, and 1% military. At that time there were 31 aircraft based at this airport: 30 single-engine airplanes and 1 multi-engine.

== Accidents and incidents ==
- On 10 October 2000, a Beechcraft E18S crashed after taking off from the airport, killing the pilot.
- On May 4, 2003, a Cessna 182 Skylane was substantially damaged while landing at the Fayette County Airport. A witness reported that the aircraft landed with sufficient space left on the runway but that its nose gear collapsed during the rollout. The aircraft then veered off the runway. The probable cause of the accident was found to be a failure of the nose gear assembly.

== See also ==
- List of airports in Ohio
