= Edward Smith Jr. Farm =

- U.S. National Register of Historic Places
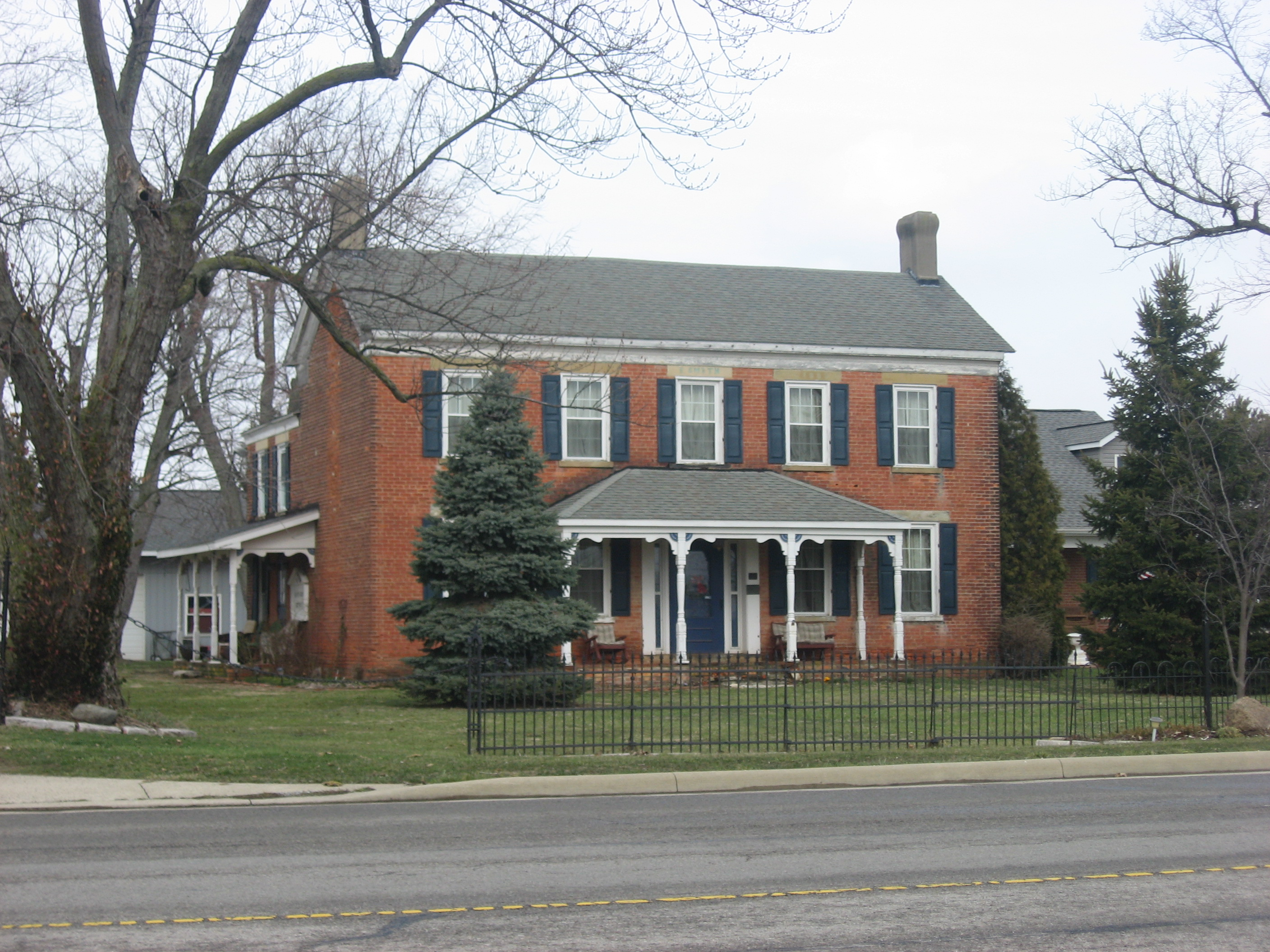
- Front and western side

- Location within Ohio Location within the United States
- Location: 2085 U.S. Route 62, northeast of Washington Court House, Ohio
- Coordinates: 39°33′16″N 83°25′10″W
- Area: Less than 1 acre (0.40 ha)
- Built: 1855
- Architect: Edward Smith Jr.
- Architectural style: Greek Revival
- NRHP reference No.: 87002110
- Added to NRHP: December 9, 1987

The Edward Smith Jr. Farm is a historic farm complex located near Washington Court House in Fayette County, Ohio, United States. Home to one of Fayette County's earliest residents, the farm has experienced remarkably few changes since the nineteenth century, and it has been named a historic site.

== Edward Smith ==
Edward Smith Jr. was born in Pennsylvania and moved to Fayette County with his parents in 1810; they were likely the first settlers on the present site of Washington Court House. Development of the family farm was hindered by the War of 1812 when Edward Smith Sr. volunteered for military service, and his death while trying to cross a flooded stream caused further hardship for the family. Nevertheless, his widow raised their ten children; Edward Jr. and all nine of his siblings lived into adulthood. Edward Jr. married Nancy Kukel, who bore him ten children.

== Architecture ==
Built in 1855, Smith's farmhouse is an I-house with substantial Greek Revival influence. Both the walls and the foundation are brick, while the gabled roof is asphalt. Five bays wide in the front, the two-story residence features a porch in the middle of its first story; the main entrance and one window on each side face the porch. Inside, important components include walnut-wood trim, a simple early stairway, and doorways with stencilwork. In 1875, the house was expanded with the construction of a vernacular Victorian addition, thus making the house a leading example of transitional 19th-century architecture in the area.

== Preservation ==
The house and several outbuildings compose a farmstead unique in the area for its high degree of preservation from the middle of the 19th century. Two of them, the barn and the smokehouse, are original to the property and have experienced few changes; built of wood, they are important as surviving examples of early construction methods and lifeways for farmers in the area. The farmstead's integrity is such that it has received national recognition: in late 1987, it was listed on the National Register of Historic Places because of its architecture.
