= Jacob Light House =

- U.S. National Register of Historic Places
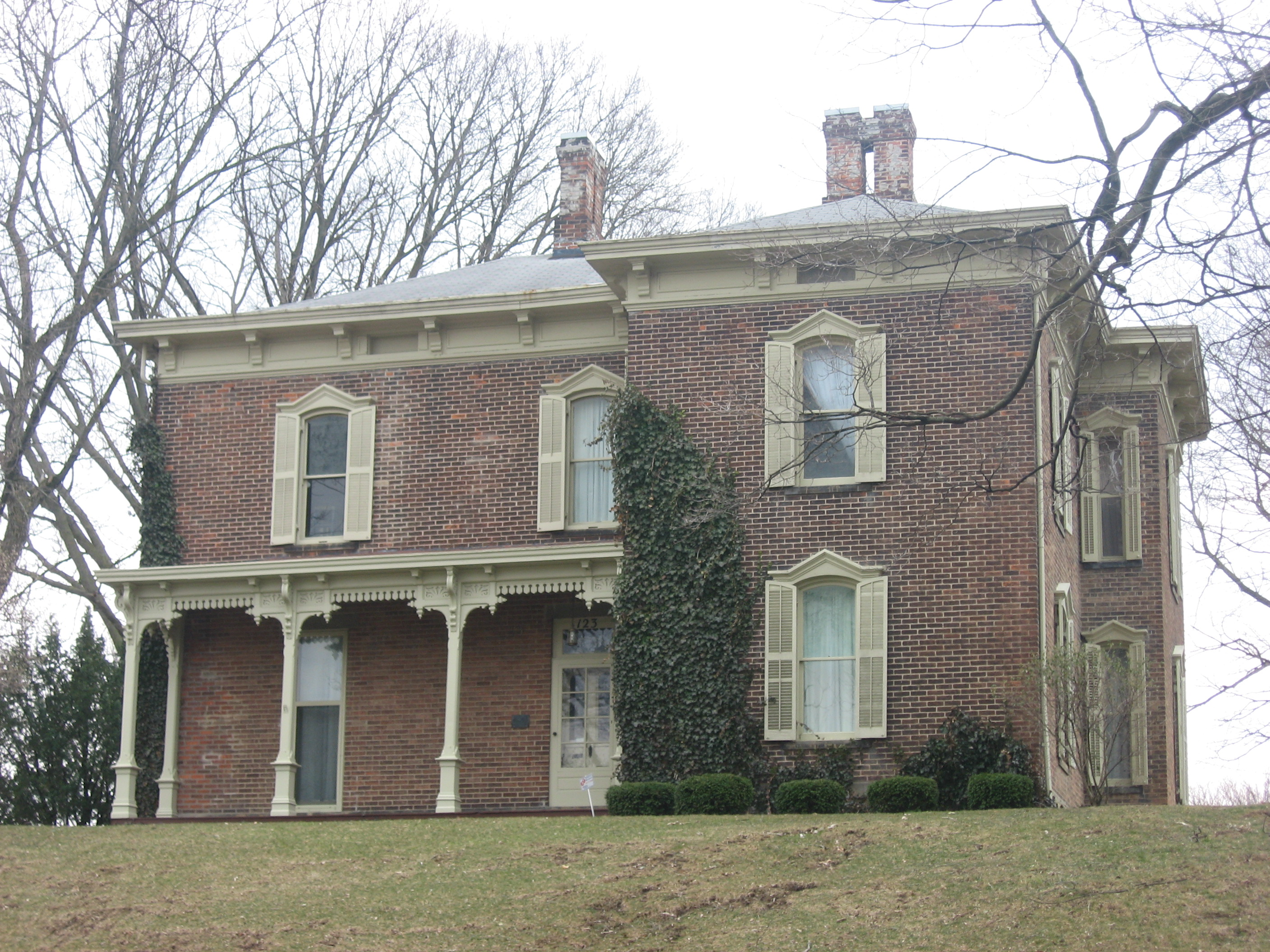
- Front and western side

- Location within Ohio Location within the United States
- Location: 123 W. Circle Ave., Washington Court House, Ohio
- Coordinates: 39°31′53″N 83°26′13″W
- Area: 0.4 acres (0.16 ha)
- Built: 1875
- Architectural style: Italianate
- NRHP reference No.: 88003191
- Added to NRHP: January 13, 1989

The Jacob Light House is a historic residence in the city of Washington Court House, Ohio, United States. Once home to a prominent local craftsman, it has been designated a historic site as a well-preserved example of the Italianate style of architecture.

With the coming of multiple railroad lines, Washington Court House became an increasingly important center of commerce in the third quarter of the nineteenth century. Among those attracted to the city was Jacob Light, a tailor who had established himself as a regional merchant. Light purchased from Mills Gardner a sizeable lot south of the city's downtown on 10 May 1875, and by the beginning of June, he had commenced the construction of the present house. Built of brick on a stone foundation and covered with a slate roof, the L-shaped house is a distinctive example of the Italianate style. Among its prominent architectural components are the shallow hip roof, the front porch and its handcarven support beams, the shutters and pediments of the windows, and the brackets supporting the cornice. Particularly significant are the porch supports, which demonstrate the extent to which local woodcarving had progressed during the nineteenth century.

After sixty-one years of ownership, Jacob Light's family sold the house in 1936. Later owners preserved the house with few changes; more than fifty years later, it remained a good example of the Italianate style, of which just twenty other houses remained in the city by the late 1980s. In early 1988, the house was listed on the National Register of Historic Places, qualifying because of its historically significant architecture.
