= Fayette County Courthouse (Ohio) =

Local government building in the United States

- U.S. National Register of Historic Places
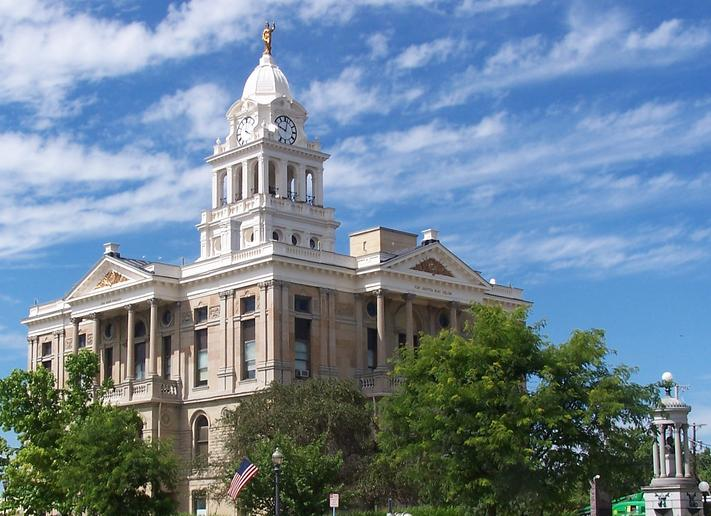
- The Fayette County Courthouse

- Location within Ohio Location within the United States
- Interactive map showing the location of Fayette County Courthouse
- Location: Main and Court Sts., Washington Court House, Ohio
- Coordinates: 39°32′11″N 83°26′24″W
- Area: 1.5 acres (0.61 ha)
- Built: 1882
- Architect: Gibbs & Co.; D.W. Gibbs
- Architectural style: Second Empire
- NRHP reference No.: 73001433
- Added to NRHP: July 2, 1973

The Fayette County Courthouse is a historic courthouse building located at 110 East Court Street in Washington Court House, Ohio. On July 2, 1973, it was added to the National Register.

== History ==
The area that is currently Fayette County was once part of the Virginia Military District and was established as a county in 1810 from part of Ross County. The county seat was placed at Bloomingburg and court was held in the home of John Devault. The county seat was moved to Washington Court House in 1812 and a wooden structure was built that year. This building was replaced by a brick structure in 1813, and ultimately burned downed in 1828.

The county rebuilt at the same site in 1828, erecting a structure with 40 square feet (3.7 m^{2}) and an additional wing measuring 14 x 30 feet (9.1 m). This was soon deemed too small and a new courthouse was designed by architect David W. Gibbs and began construction in 1882. The courthouse closely resembles the county courthouse in Marion. The courthouse was completed in 1885 and has served the county since.

== Exterior ==
The Second Empire style building rises three-stories on its square foundation. The ground floor consists of smooth stone blocks and rectangular windows. The building contains central projections with smooth stone blocks on all faces with a flight of stairs accessing the entrances. The entrances are set into a recessed arched alcove with two long arched windows on the fronts. Above the alcove is a small balcony topped by a pediment, which is supported by four Ionic columns. The pediment contains a tympanum decorated with a wreath surrounded by flags. A balustrade lines the balcony. The second floor contains arched windows set into rusticated stone blocks. Decorative carved wreaths are set between each window. The third floor is lined with smooth stones and is pierced by long rectangular windows topped by a small square window above. A decorative frieze runs along this floor between the windows and Corinthian pilasters frame each window. The roof is supported by an entablature with dentil moldings and a balustrade lines the flat roof. A central tower rises on a solid bricked drum, the drum supports an arched and pillared bell tower. The bell tower is topped by a four faced clock which supports a dome rising to a statue.
