= Barney Kelley House =

- U.S. National Register of Historic Places
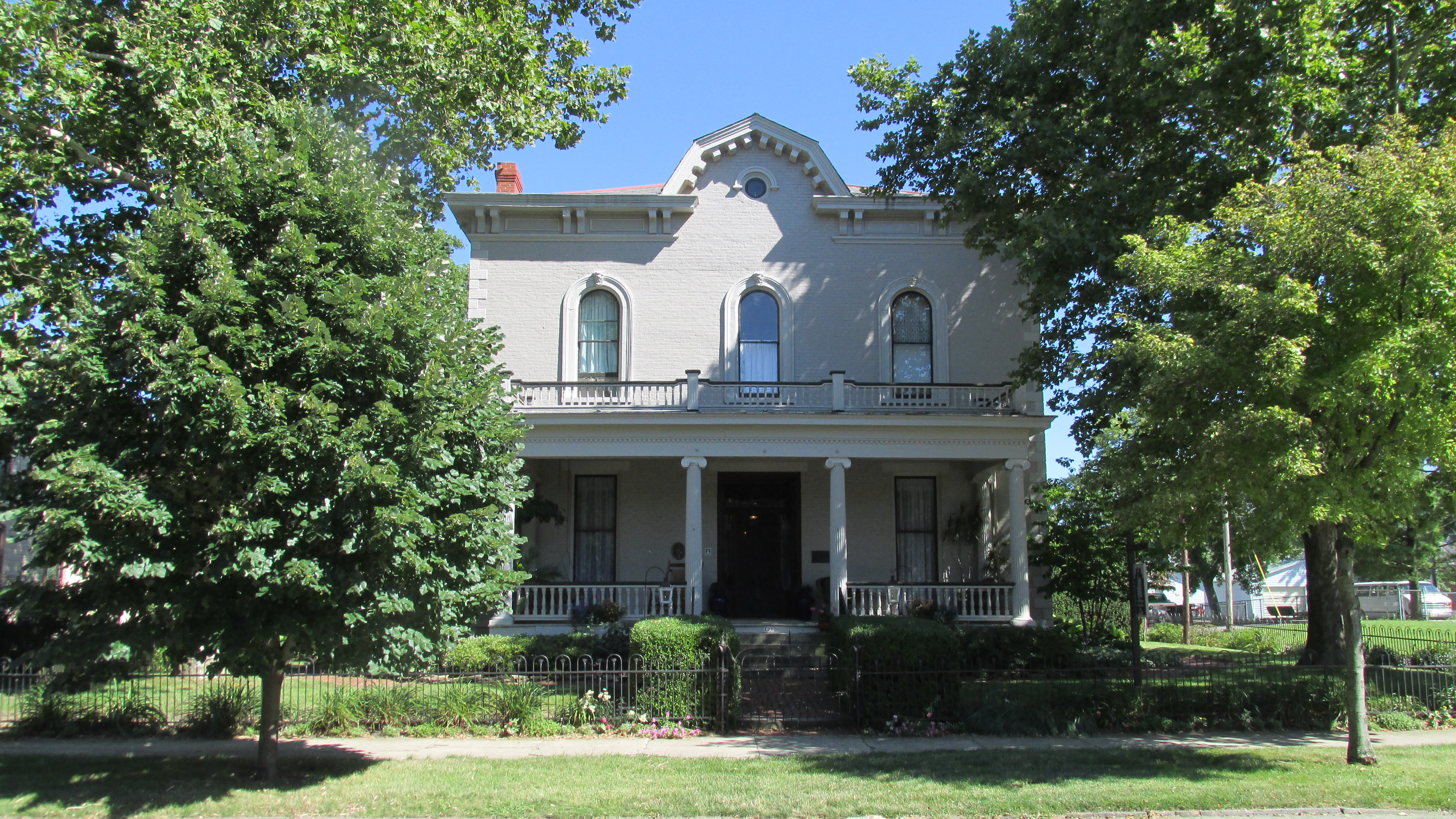
- Front of the house

- Location within Ohio Location within the United States
- Location: 321 E. East St., Washington Court House, Ohio
- Coordinates: 39°32′12″N 83°26′10″W
- Area: Less than 1 acre (0.40 ha)
- Built: 1875
- Architect: L.C. and B.S. Coffman; Amos Cooke
- Architectural style: Italianate
- NRHP reference No.: 79001834
- Added to NRHP: April 17, 1979

The Barney Kelley House is a historic residence in Washington Court House, Ohio, United States. Built amid a period of commercial prosperity for the city, it was home to some of the area's leading businessmen for many decades.

Born in 1834 in Ireland, Barney Kelley immigrated to the United States and moved to Washington Court House in the 1860s. At this time, the city was growing rapidly due to improved transportation: multiple railroads served the city, making it a fine site for commerce. Kelley soon opened a combined saloon and general store on East Main Street, selling everything from food to cutlery. In 1875, he arranged for the construction of the present house; and at this address he lived until selling it to Thomas Craig in 1896. Craig and his family, the owners of the city's Craig Brothers Department Store, owned the house until 1975.

The Kelley House is a brick building with a stone foundation, an asphalt roof, and various additional elements of stone. Designed and built by L.C. and B.C. Coffman and by Amos Cooke, it is one of several Italianate houses in the city, but none of the others feature the Kelley House's most prominent component. Some of its typical Italianate features include the ornamental frieze, the cornice supported by pairs of brackets, the keystones and architraves on the rounded arched windows, and the quoins. Setting the house apart from the other Italianate residences is its unusual circular front dormer window, set in a semicircular extension of the facade. The side of the house is divided into two bays and the front into three, with the main entrance in the middle; a porch is placed across the full width of the facade. Washington Court House is not the only city in the region in which circular dormer windows are rare; the Doan House is the only such residence with such a window in Wilmington to the southeast.

In 1979, the Kelley House was listed on the National Register of Historic Places. One of several houses in the city with this distinction, it was listed both because it was the home of a prominent local citizen and because of its architecture.
