= Washington Cemetery (Washington Court House, Ohio) =

- Washington Cemetery Historic District
- U.S. National Register of Historic Places
- U.S. Historic district
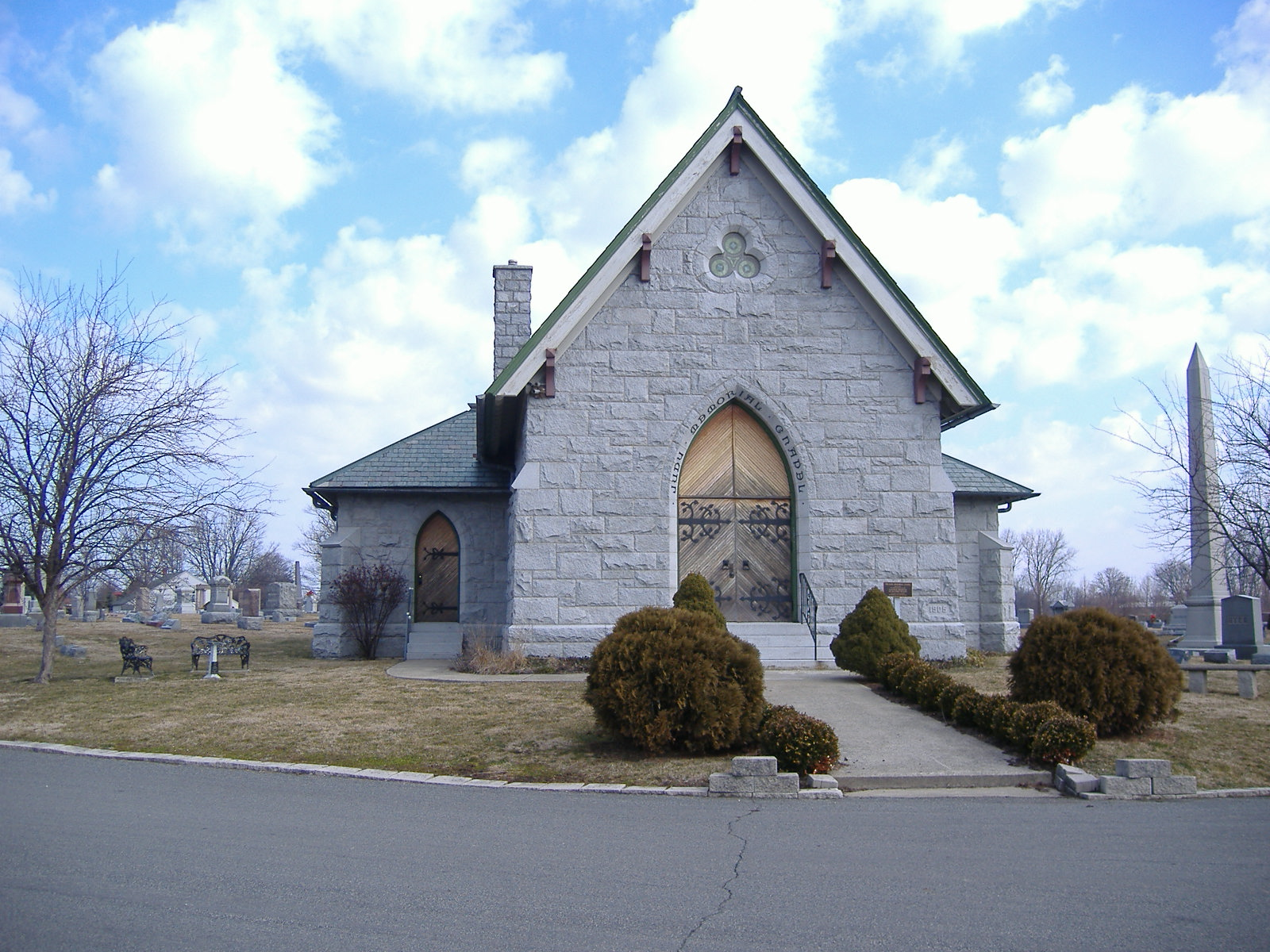
- Judy Chapel, a prominent part of the cemetery

- Location within Ohio Location within the United States
- Location: 1741 Washington Ave., Washington Court House, Ohio
- Coordinates: 39°32′19″N 83°25′1″W
- Area: 23.5 acres (9.5 ha)
- Architect: J.W. Fiske & Co.; W.H. Mullins Segesman
- NRHP reference No.: 06000765
- Added to NRHP: September 6, 2006

- Judy Chapel
- U.S. National Register of Historic Places
- Location: 1741 Washington Ave., Washington Court House, Ohio
- Coordinates: 39°32′20″N 83°25′0″W
- Area: Less than 1 acre (0.40 ha)
- Built: 1905
- Architect: David H. Buchanan
- Architectural style: Late Gothic Revival
- NRHP reference No.: 98000441
- Added to NRHP: May 8, 1998

The Washington Cemetery is a historic rural cemetery on the outskirts of the city of Washington Court House in the southeastern part of the U.S. state of Ohio. Established in the mid-19th century, the cemetery was transformed from a typical cemetery into a masterpiece of design during its first several decades. It is the burial place of several prominent political figures, and elements of its design have caused it to be designated a historic site.

== Establishment ==
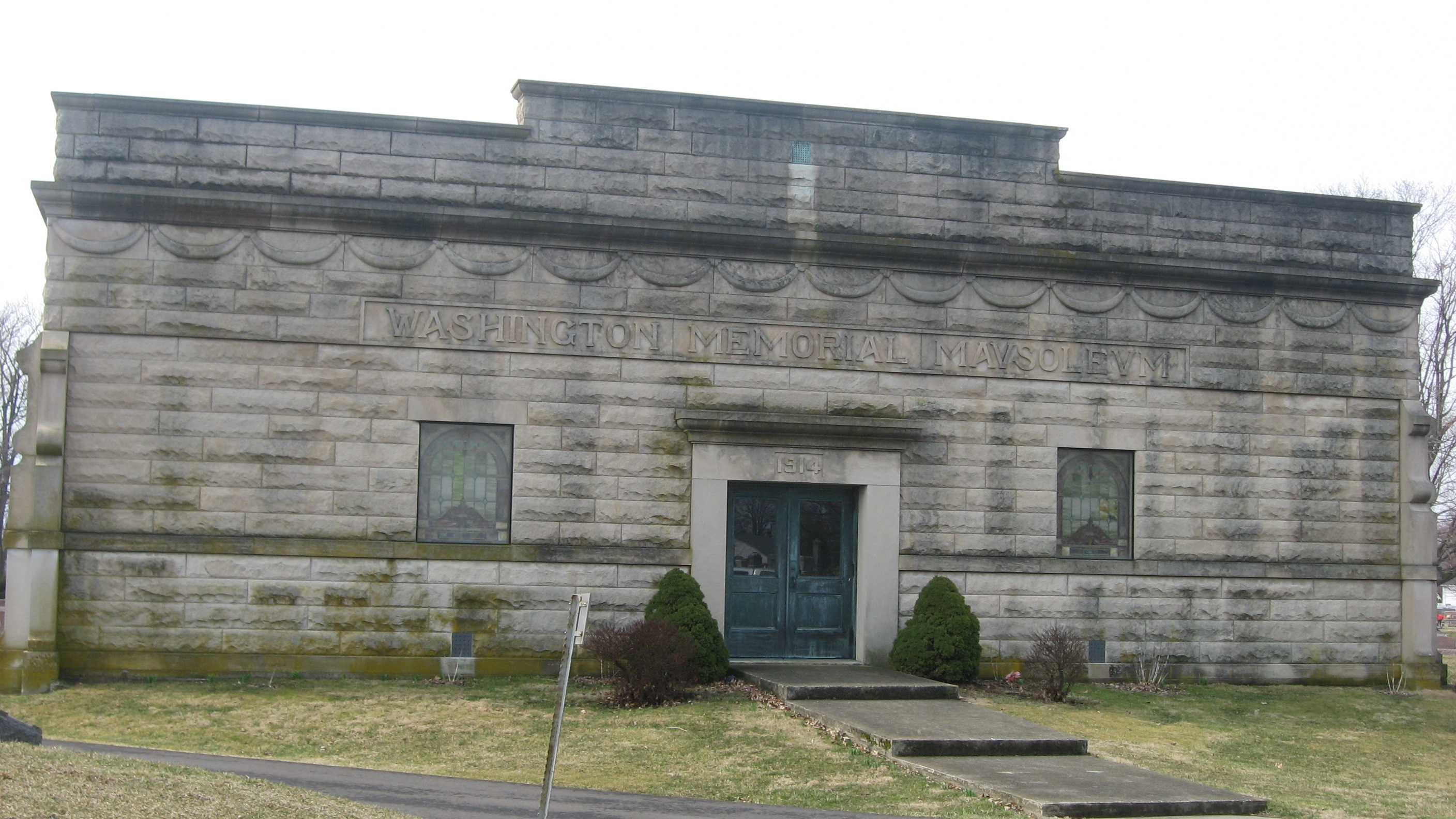
Washington Memorial Mausoleum

The cemetery was platted in 1856 by several eminent citizens, including Judge Daniel McLain, who had previously owned the land. Although its original boundaries encompassed 10 acres (4.0 ha), the area was soon tripled. As soon as the cemetery was properly organized in a legal fashion, it was devised to the city and to Union Township. Colonel Samuel N. Yeoman, a former forty-niner and Civil War veteran, established the cemetery; he participated in planning its layout and served as its first president. Under the leadership of superintendents W.B. Ely, James Holmes, and George Gossard, the cemetery was converted from an ordinary burial ground into a garden cemetery of a sort little seen in Ohio except in the large cities. Some of the leading components of its design are the winding driveways, artificial lakes, rare shrubs and trees, and a fountain that was placed in 1892. Two of the most prominent buildings in the cemetery are its mausoleum (originally known as the "Washington Memorial") and its chapel (originally the "Doctor Judy Memorial"; now known as the "Judy Chapel"), which were constructed in 1914 and 1905 respectively.

== Later history ==
In 1903, local residents began planning a streetcar line for the city, with the cemetery to be the terminus; although rails and other resources were purchased, the concept was ultimately abandoned without anything having been built. As the twentieth century passed, the cemetery fell into disarray; money was saved by filling in a lake, and the fountain and chapel deteriorated. Under the leadership of the garden clubs of Fayette County, Judy Chapel and the fountain were restored in 1997 and the early 2000s respectively. The chapel was listed on the National Register of Historic Places in 1998, and the entire cemetery followed it eight years later; it was designated the "Washington Cemetery Historic District." This designation was unusual, for both religious properties and cemeteries are generally ineligible for the National Register and must pass higher standards than most other properties to be eligible for inclusion.

== Notable burials ==
Two U.S. Representatives are buried at Washington Cemetery: Mills Gardner (died 1910) and James D. Post (died 1921), as well as Harry M. Daugherty, who served as United States Attorney General during the presidencies of Warren G. Harding and Calvin Coolidge in the 1920s.
