= Washington Court House, Ohio =

City in Fayette County, Ohio, US

- City
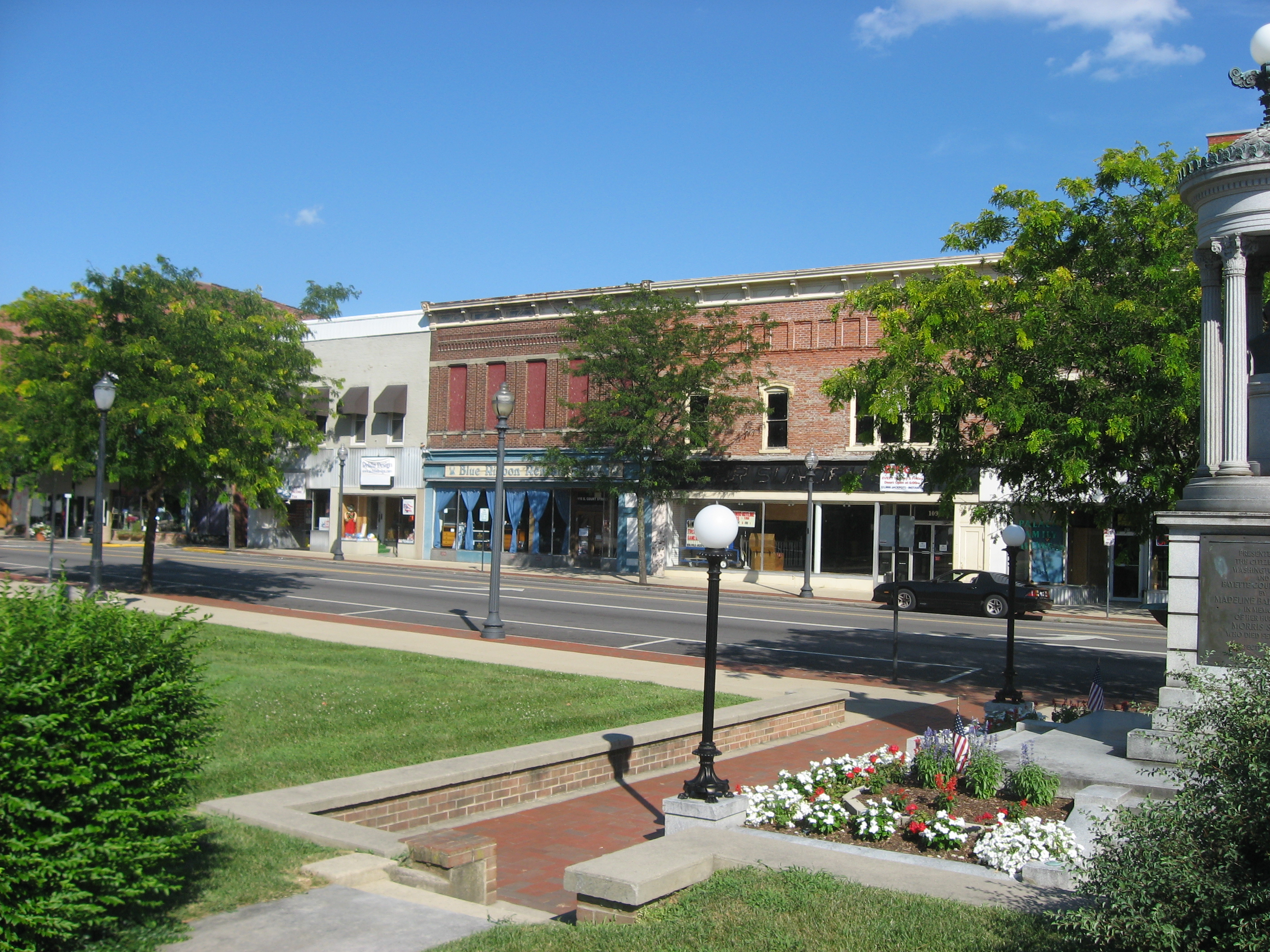
- Downtown Washington Court House from the courthouse lawn

- Seal
- Nickname: Washington C.H.
- Interactive map of Washington Court House, Ohio
- Location within Ohio Location within the United States
- Coordinates: 39°32′17″N 83°25′41″W
- Country: United States
- State: Ohio
- County: Fayette
- Township: Union

Government
  - City manager: Joe Denen

Area
  - Total: 8.98 sq mi (23.27 km^{2})
  - Land: 8.92 sq mi (23.11 km^{2})
  - Water: 0.062 sq mi (0.16 km^{2})
- Elevation: 965 ft (294 m)

Population (2020)
  - Total: 14,401
  - Density: 1,613.7/sq mi (623.05/km^{2})
- Time zone: UTC−5 (Eastern (EST))
  - Summer (DST): UTC−4 (EDT)
- ZIP code: 43160
- Area code: 740
- FIPS code: 39-81214
- GNIS feature ID: 1086095
- Website: www.cityofwch.com

Washington Court House (often abbreviated as Washington C.H.) is a city in Fayette County, Ohio, United States, and its county seat. The population was 14,401 at the 2020 census. The area was initially settled by Virginia veterans of the American Revolution, who received the land from the government as payment for their service in the war.

== Name ==
Officially named Washington as far back as 1910, the "Court House" suffix was used to distinguish the city from other places in the state with "Washington" in their name (Ohio also has an Old Washington, New Washington, Washingtonville, and Port Washington). The suffix is attributed to settlers who had come from Virginia, where "Court House" was used with county seats (e.g. Appomattox Court House). "Washington C. H." was added to maps and postal guides, and the de facto use of "Washington Court House" persisted over time. The name was made official when the city adopted a new charter in the early 2000s. (Note: The city's website gives a 2002 date for the charter change that formally adopted the Washington Court House name; however, the charter itself cites an effective date of January 1, 2004.) "Washington Court House" is the longest city name in the state of Ohio.

== History ==
Washington Court House's first settlers appear to have been Edward Smith Sr., and his family, who emigrated from Pennsylvania in 1810. Smith and his family constructed a crude house in the thick woodlands near Paint Creek, but their efforts to clear the land were interrupted by his departure for military service in the War of 1812. Comparatively soon after returning from his martial pursuits, Smith drowned while attempting to cross a flooded creek, but his widow and 10 children survived and prospered despite the absence of their patriarch. Smith's descendants remained prominent in Fayette County for more than a century after his arrival from Pennsylvania, although many had left Washington Court House for other parts of the county. A family residence still stands on U.S. Route 62 not far outside the city's eastern boundary.

In 1833, Washington Court House (then known as Washington) contained a printing office, seven stores, two taverns, two groceries, a schoolhouse, a meeting house, and about 70 residential houses.

Numerous locations in the city are listed on the National Register of Historic Places. Downtown, the courthouse square has been named a historic district, and a similar designation has been accorded the city cemetery. Nine individual buildings are separately listed on the register: Judy Chapel at the cemetery, the former Washington School, the Fayette County Courthouse, the former William Burnett House (no longer standing), and the Barney Kelley, Jacob Light, Rawlings-Brownell, Robinson-Pavey, and Morris Sharp houses.

Streets within the downtown part of the city around the courthouse building are arranged northeast–southwest and northwest–southeast, rather than east–west and north–south, so that each side of the courthouse receives some sunlight every day of the year.

=== 1894 riot ===
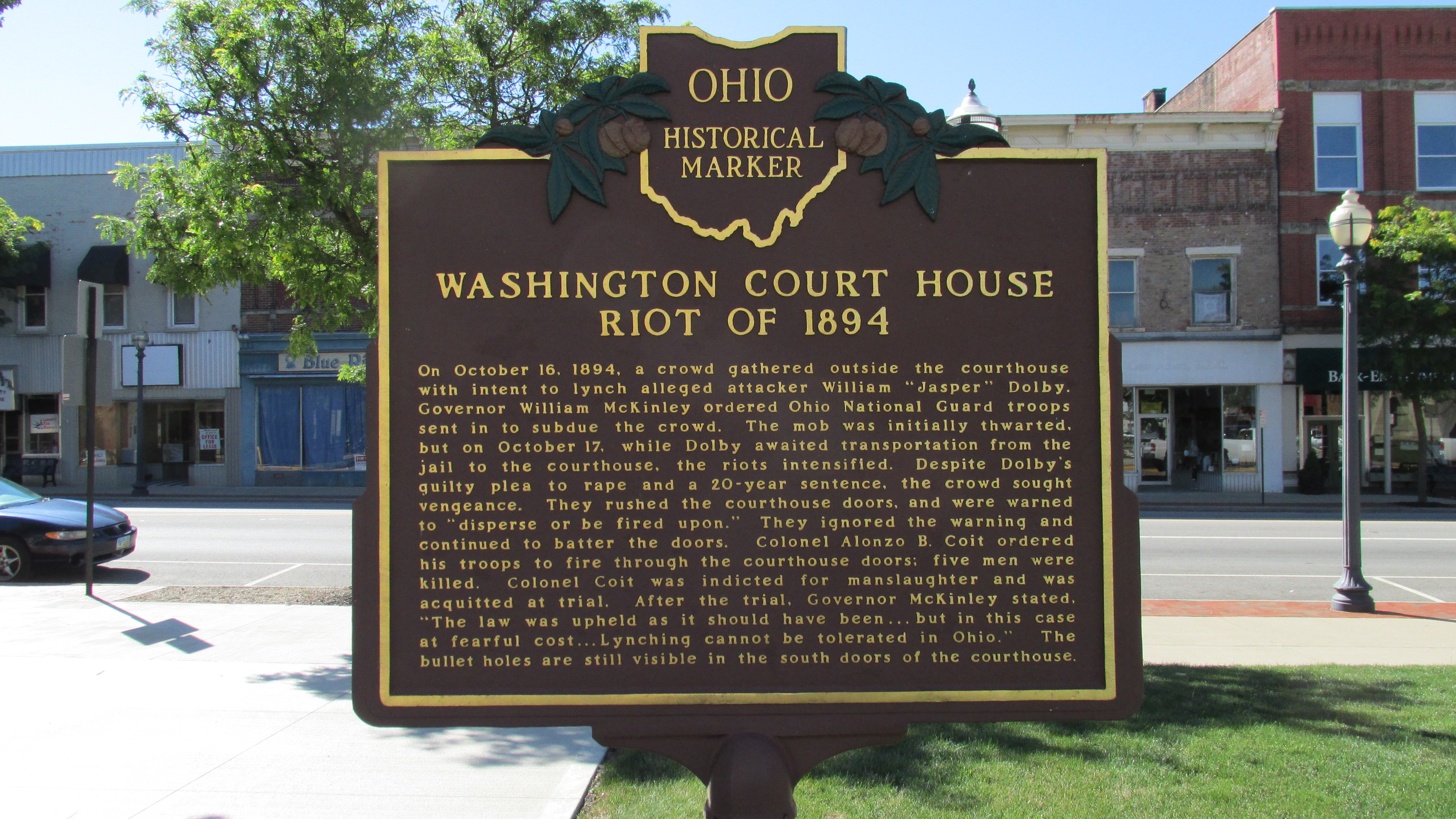
Ohio Historical Marker on the front lawn of the Fayette County Courthouse

On October 16, 1894, a crowd gathered outside the Fayette County Courthouse with intent to lynch William "Jasper" Dolby, a black man who had been convicted of sexually assaulting a white woman. Ohio Governor William McKinley called out the militia to subdue the crowd. On October 17, the crowd rushed the courthouse doors and was warned to "disperse or be fired upon." They ignored the warning and continued to batter the doors.

Colonel Alonzo B. Coit ordered his troops to fire through the courthouse doors, killing five men. Colonel Coit was indicted for manslaughter, but was acquitted at trial. After the trial, Governor McKinley stated, "The law was upheld as it should have been... but in this case at fearful cost... Lynching cannot be tolerated in Ohio." The courthouse doors were not repaired or replaced and the bullet holes from the 1894 riot are still present in the southeast doors.

== Geography ==
Washington Court House is located along Paint Creek.

According to the United States Census Bureau, the city has a total area of 8.80 square miles (22.79 km^{2}), of which 8.74 square miles (22.64 km^{2}) is land and 0.06 square miles (0.16 km^{2}) is covered by water.

=== Climate ===
Climate data for Washington Court House, Ohio, 1991–2020 normals, extremes 1915–present
Month	Jan	Feb	Mar	Apr	May	Jun	Jul	Aug	Sep	Oct	Nov	Dec	Year
Record high °F (°C)	74 (23)	77 (25)	87 (31)	89 (32)	95 (35)	101 (38)	107 (42)	103 (39)	102 (39)	92 (33)	81 (27)	77 (25)	107 (42)
Mean maximum °F (°C)	60.9 (16.1)	64.3 (17.9)	73.4 (23.0)	79.6 (26.4)	85.9 (29.9)	90.5 (32.5)	91.8 (33.2)	90.9 (32.7)	89.1 (31.7)	82.9 (28.3)	70.3 (21.3)	63.2 (17.3)	93.1 (33.9)
Mean daily maximum °F (°C)	36.0 (2.2)	39.9 (4.4)	50.2 (10.1)	63.8 (17.7)	73.0 (22.8)	80.7 (27.1)	83.5 (28.6)	82.3 (27.9)	77.2 (25.1)	65.7 (18.7)	51.8 (11.0)	40.7 (4.8)	62.1 (16.7)
Daily mean °F (°C)	27.8 (−2.3)	30.9 (−0.6)	39.9 (4.4)	51.6 (10.9)	61.8 (16.6)	70.1 (21.2)	73.2 (22.9)	71.7 (22.1)	65.5 (18.6)	54.0 (12.2)	41.9 (5.5)	32.9 (0.5)	51.8 (11.0)
Mean daily minimum °F (°C)	19.6 (−6.9)	21.9 (−5.6)	29.6 (−1.3)	39.5 (4.2)	50.5 (10.3)	59.6 (15.3)	62.9 (17.2)	61.1 (16.2)	53.9 (12.2)	42.3 (5.7)	31.9 (−0.1)	25.1 (−3.8)	41.5 (5.3)
Mean minimum °F (°C)	0.4 (−17.6)	4.1 (−15.5)	12.7 (−10.7)	25.3 (−3.7)	36.9 (2.7)	48.0 (8.9)	54.3 (12.4)	52.0 (11.1)	40.6 (4.8)	29.6 (−1.3)	18.3 (−7.6)	8.9 (−12.8)	−3.4 (−19.7)
Record low °F (°C)	−27 (−33)	−14 (−26)	−6 (−21)	16 (−9)	26 (−3)	37 (3)	44 (7)	37 (3)	28 (−2)	15 (−9)	−6 (−21)	−20 (−29)	−27 (−33)
Average precipitation inches (mm)	3.01 (76)	2.53 (64)	3.76 (96)	4.06 (103)	4.45 (113)	4.33 (110)	3.95 (100)	3.35 (85)	2.69 (68)	2.69 (68)	2.78 (71)	3.19 (81)	40.79 (1,035)
Average snowfall inches (cm)	7.9 (20)	3.7 (9.4)	2.8 (7.1)	0.3 (0.76)	0.0 (0.0)	0.0 (0.0)	0.0 (0.0)	0.0 (0.0)	0.0 (0.0)	0.2 (0.51)	0.7 (1.8)	2.7 (6.9)	18.3 (46.47)
Average precipitation days (≥ 0.01 in)	11.7	10.3	11.6	13.0	13.2	11.5	10.7	8.2	8.1	9.6	10.6	11.1	129.6
Average snowy days (≥ 0.1 in)	3.8	2.3	1.5	0.3	0.0	0.0	0.0	0.0	0.0	0.1	0.6	2.1	10.7
Source 1: NOAA
Source 2: National Weather Service

== Demographics ==
Historical population
Census	Pop.	Note	%±
1820	191		—
1830	299		56.5%
1850	569		—
1860	1,035		81.9%
1870	2,117		104.5%
1880	3,798		79.4%
1890	5,742		51.2%
1900	5,751		0.2%
1910	7,277		26.5%
1920	7,962		9.4%
1930	8,426		5.8%
1940	9,402		11.6%
1950	10,560		12.3%
1960	12,388		17.3%
1970	12,495		0.9%
1980	12,648		1.2%
1990	12,983		2.6%
2000	13,524		4.2%
2010	14,192		4.9%
2020	14,401		1.5%
2025 (est.)	14,375		−0.2%

=== Racial and ethnic composition ===
Racial composition as of the 2020 census
Race	Number	Percent
White	12,987	90.2%
Black or African American	372	2.6%
American Indian and Alaska Native	31	0.2%
Asian	135	0.9%
Native Hawaiian and Other Pacific Islander	1	0.0%
Some other race	139	1.0%
Two or more races	736	5.1%
Hispanic or Latino (of any race)	343	2.4%

=== 2020 census ===
As of the 2020 census, Washington Court House had a population of 14,401. The median age was 40.9 years, 23.1% of residents were under the age of 18, and 20.4% of residents were 65 years of age or older. For every 100 females there were 90.3 males, and for every 100 females age 18 and over there were 87.0 males age 18 and over.

99.4% of residents lived in urban areas, while 0.6% lived in rural areas.

There were 6,113 households in Washington Court House, of which 27.7% had children under the age of 18 living in them. Of all households, 36.3% were married-couple households, 20.0% were households with a male householder and no spouse or partner present, and 33.9% were households with a female householder and no spouse or partner present. About 34.8% of all households were made up of individuals and 16.7% had someone living alone who was 65 years of age or older.

There were 6,569 housing units, of which 6.9% were vacant. The homeowner vacancy rate was 2.3% and the rental vacancy rate was 4.1%.

=== 2010 census ===
As of the census of 2010, there were 14,192 people, 5,762 households, and 3,628 families residing in the city. The population density was 1,623.8 inhabitants per square mile (627.0/km^{2}). There were 6,433 housing units at an average density of 736.0 per square mile (284.2/km^{2}). The racial makeup of the city was 93.5% White, 2.7% African American, 0.3% Native American, 0.8% Asian, 0.6% from other races, and 2.1% from two or more races. Hispanic or Latino of any race were 1.8% of the population.

There were 5,762 households, of which 32.8% had children under the age of 18 living with them, 40.7% were married couples living together, 16.6% had a female householder with no husband present, 5.7% had a male householder with no wife present, and 37.0% were non-families. 31.1% of all households were made up of individuals, and 12.7% had someone living alone who was 65 years of age or older. The average household size was 2.37 and the average family size was 2.92.

The median age in the city was 38.4 years. 25% of residents were under the age of 18; 8.1% were between the ages of 18 and 24; 25.7% were from 25 to 44; 25.2% were from 45 to 64; and 15.9% were 65 years of age or older. The gender makeup of the city was 47.7% male and 52.3% female.

=== 2000 census ===
As of the census of 2000, there were 13,524 people, 5,483 households, and 3,536 families residing in the city. The population density was 810.8/km^{2} (2,100.8/mi^{2}). There were 5,961 housing units at an average density of 357.4/km^{2} (926.0/mi^{2}). The racial makeup of the city was 94.52% White, 2.71% African American, 0.16% Native American, 0.82% Asian, 0.01% Pacific Islander, 0.66% from other races, and 1.12% from two or more races. Hispanic or Latino of any race were 1.38% of the population.

There were 5,483 households, out of which 31.1% had children under the age of 18 living with them, 46.5% were married couples living together, 13.7% had a female householder with no husband present, and 35.5% were non-families. 30.7% of all households were made up of individuals, and 14.2% had someone living alone who was 65 years of age or older. The average household size was 2.37 and the average family size was 2.93.

In the city the age distribution of the population showed 25.0% under the age of 18, 8.1% from 18 to 24, 28.2% from 25 to 44, 22.0% from 45 to 64, and 16.7% who were 65 years of age or older. The median age was 37 years. For every 100 females, there were 92.7 males. For every 100 females age 18 and over, there were 87.0 males.

The median income for a household in the city was $33,003, and the median income for a family was $40,721. Males had a median income of $31,708 versus $22,382 for females. The per capita income for the city was $18,618. About 9.0% of families and 12.5% of the population were below the poverty line, including 16.3% of those under the age of 18 and 13.2% ages 65 or older.

== Media ==
Washington Court House is part of the Columbus, Ohio, media market, so is served by several Columbus-area television and radio stations. The city has two local radio stations. Buckeye Country 105.5 FM (WCHO-FM) WCHO plays country music and (WCHO-AM) 1250 plays oldies. Both stations cover local news, sports, and agricultural stories. Washington Court House also easily receives radio and television stations from Dayton and Cincinnati.

The hometown newspaper of Washington Court House is the Record Herald. The Record Herald was formed from the merger of two dailies — The Record-Republican and the Washington C.H. Herald — in 1937. The latter paper's publishing history dates back to 1858 when it began as a weekly. As of 2012, the Record Herald reported circulation of 5,143 daily and 21,849 for weekend inserts.

== Education ==
Education in Washington Court House comprises two public school districts, as well as a private school .

- Washington Court House City School District enrolls most school-aged children within the city limits of Washington Court House.
  - Washington High School
- Miami Trace Local School District includes Miami Trace High School.
- Fayette Christian School

Washington Court House has a public library, housed in a historic Carnegie library building.

== Airport ==
Fayette County Airport is a county-owned general aviation facility located northeast of Washington Court House.

== Notable people ==
- Randall Adams, wrongly convicted of murder; his release was accomplished by a 1988 documentary film
- Harry M. Daugherty, United States attorney general under Presidents Warren G. Harding and Calvin Coolidge
- Margaret Peterson Haddix, author of children's fiction
- Scott Lewis, Cleveland Indians baseball player 2008–09
- Sam Lucas, vaudeville actor and singer
- Tom Rogers, college football player and coach
- Art Schlichter, quarterback for Ohio State and in the NFL
- Jeff Shaw, Major League Baseball player from 1990 to 2001; two-time All-Star
- Travis Shaw, Major League Baseball player for the Boston Red Sox, and the son of Jeff Shaw
- Jess Smith, lawyer and assistant to Harry M. Daugherty

== See also ==
- Education in Washington Court House – School district in Ohio, United States
