= Ohio State Route 756 =

State highway in southwestern Ohio, US

State Route 756

Route information
- Maintained by ODOT
- Length: 13.16 mi (21.18 km)
- Existed: 1937–present

Major junctions
- West end: SR 232 in Monroe Township
- East end: SR 505 in Lewis Township

Location
- Country: United States
- State: Ohio
- Counties: Clermont, Brown

Highway system
- Ohio State Highway System; Interstate; US; State; Scenic
← SR 754	→ SR 757

State Route 756 (SR 756) is a 13.16-mile-long (21.18 km) state highway in southwestern Ohio. Located in the southern portions of Clermont and Brown Counties, it runs from SR 232 in Monroe Township to SR 505 in Lewis Township. The east–west route passes through downtown Felicity.

== Route description ==
The state route begins at an intersection with SR 232 within a valley formed by the Big Indian Creek. First heading southeast, it crosses over the aforementioned creek and climbs a hill. At the top, the terrain flattens out and SR 756 continues heading southeast towards Felicity. After intersecting SR 743 in Washington Township and crossing into Franklin Township, the route enters the village limits of Felicity on West Light Street. At the intersection with Mulberry Street, SR 222 joins SR 756 through the center of Felicity. The two routes run together until they reach North Market Street, which carries SR 133. SR 222 heads south with SR 133 but SR 756 turns north onto Market Street for one block. After its short concurrency with SR 133, SR 756 heads in a northeast direction towards Feesburg. After entering Lewis Township, Brown County, the route makes an S-curve towards the southeast but quickly returns to a northeastern bearing. The route ends at an intersection with SR 505.

== History ==
The first part of SR 756 brought into the state highway system was the current route from SR 232 to Felicity in 1937. By 1940, it was extended to SR 505, but was also routed north on SR 505 past Feesburg to SR 125. This long concurrency would remain in place until approximately 1995.

== Major intersections ==
County	Location	mi	km	Destinations	Notes
Clermont	Monroe Township	0.00	0.00	SR 232 – Point Pleasant, Bethel	
Clermont	Washington Township	2.70	4.35	SR 743 – Moscow, Point Isabel	
Clermont	Felicity	7.48	12.04	SR 222 north / Mulberry Street	Western end of SR 222 concurrency
Clermont	Felicity	7.73	12.44	SR 133 south / SR 222 south (Market Street) / Light Street	Western end of SR 133 concurrency, eastern end of SR 222 concurrency
Clermont	Felicity	7.79	12.54	SR 133 north	Eastern end of SR 133 concurrency
Brown	Lewis Township	13.16	21.18	SR 505	
1.000 mi = 1.609 km; 1.000 km = 0.621 mi: Concurrency terminus
