= U.S. Route 52 in Ohio =

Section of U.S. Highway in Ohio

U.S. Route 52
- US 52 highlighted in red

Route information
- Maintained by ODOT
- Length: 180.968 mi (291.240 km)
- Tourist routes: Ohio River Scenic Byway

Major junctions
- West end: I-74 / US 52 at the Indiana state line near Harrison
- I-275 near Blue Jay; US 27 in Cincinnati; I-75 in Cincinnati; US 127 in Cincinnati; US 42 in Cincinnati; US 22 / SR 3 in Cincinnati; I-275 / Kellogg Road in Cincinnati; US 62 / US 68 in Ripley; US 23 in Portsmouth
- East end: US 52 at the West Virginia state line in Chesapeake

Location
- Country: United States
- State: Ohio
- Counties: Hamilton, Clermont, Brown, Adams, Scioto, Lawrence

Highway system
- United States Numbered Highway System; List; Special; Divided; Ohio State Highway System; Interstate; US; State; Scenic
← SR 51	→ SR 53

U.S. Route 52 (US 52) runs east–west across the southern part of the state of Ohio along the Ohio River, passing through or very near the cities and towns of Cincinnati, Portsmouth, and Ironton. For its first 19 miles (31 km) or so, the highway runs concurrently with Interstate 74 (I-74) and I-75 before it winds through downtown Cincinnati for several miles. The route is primarily two lanes between New Richmond and West Portsmouth, Ohio, where it becomes a four-lane partial access highway until it exits the state near Chesapeake.

== Route description ==
=== Indiana state line to Downtown Cincinnati ===
Starting at the Indiana state line, US 52, along with I-74, travel due southeast. In Harrison, both routes first meet New Haven Road and then Dry Fork Road. From Blue Jay to Dent, I-275 runs concurrently with both routes. While the three routes are sharing the same freeway, they meet SR 128 in Miamitown. After I-275 branches due northeast, both US 52 and I-74 then meet Rybolt Road/Harrison Avenue and North Bend Road; all are partial cloverleaf interchanges. After entering Cincinnati, they then meet Montana Avenue at an incomplete diamond interchange and US 27 (Beekman Street)/Colerain Avenue. At this point, US 27 runs concurrently with US 52. Less than a mile after that, I-74 ends as they meet I-75 west of the Cincinnati State Technical and Community College.

US 52 and US 27 then briefly follow south along I-75 before exiting at Hopple Street. Then, they also briefly travel east along that street before intersecting US 127 (Central Parkway) at a one-quadrant interchange. At this point, both routes travel south along US 127, largely paralleling I-75. As they reach Downtown Cincinnati, they split as a two-way pair. As a two-way pair, they intersect US 22, US 42, US 50, SR 3, and SR 264.

=== Downtown Cincinnati to Portsmouth ===
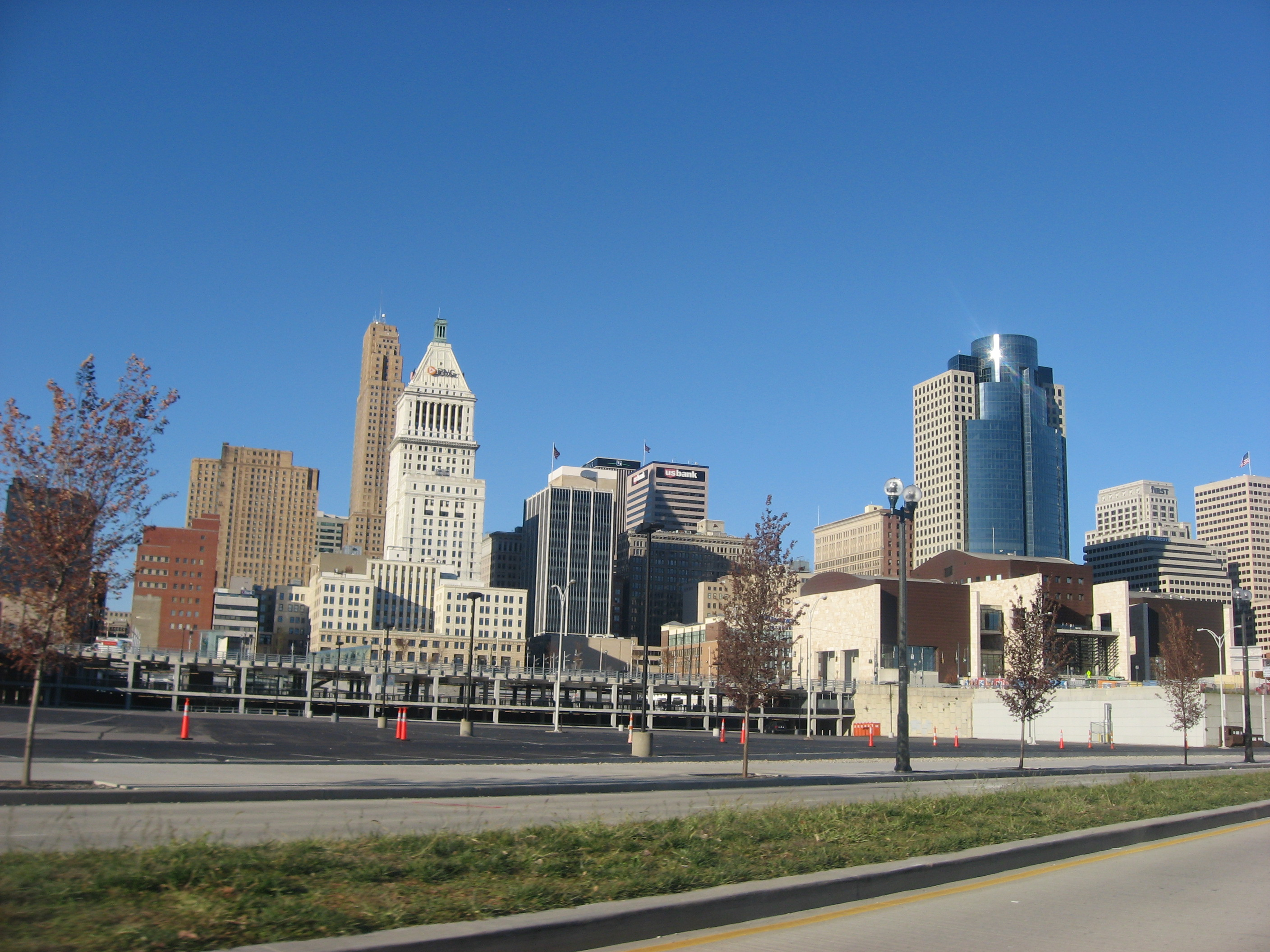
Mehring Way in Downtown Cincinnati

At this point, most of the remainder of US 52 in Ohio is part of the Ohio River Scenic Byway.

US 52 and US 27 then turn eastward along Mehring Way. Both routes run along the north bank of the Ohio River, serving two stadiums (the Paul Brown Stadium and the Great American Ball Park). They also cross under the John A. Roebling Suspension Bridge. After that, US 27 turns west onto Pete Rose Way and then south on the Taylor–Southgate Bridge. US 52 proceeds eastward to continue running along the bank of the river. Then, up until the Cincinnati Municipal Airport Lunken Field, US 52 is sandwiched between US 50 up north and the river down south. After the airport, the route briefly runs concurrently again with I-275.

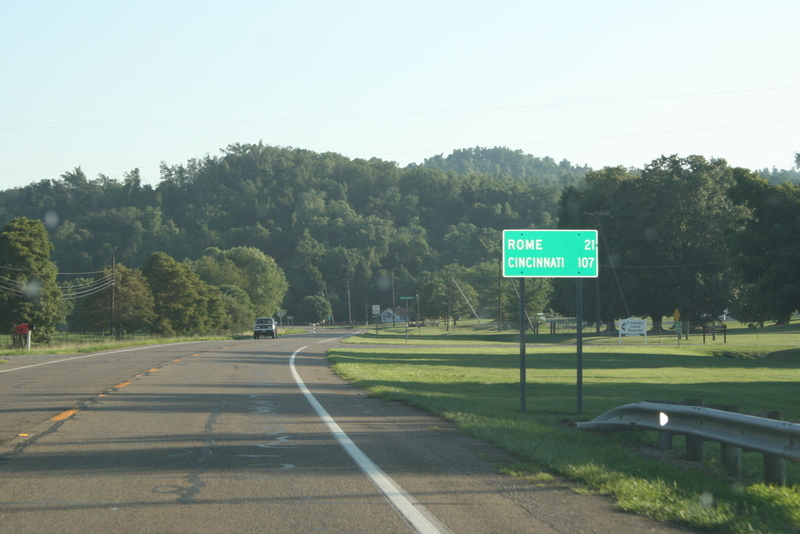
US 52 near SR 125 in Friendship, OH

US 52 then intersects several state routes in different locations. Between Ripley and the William H. Harsha Bridge, US 62 and US 68 run along with US 52. In downtown Aberdeen, US 52 intersects SR 41 and then the Simon Kenton Memorial Bridge. On its way towards Portsmouth, the route intersects a few more state routes. As it gets close to Portsmouth, it becomes a short freeway, meeting SR 239 and SR 852/SR 73. After crossing the Scioto River, it enters downtown Portsmouth, ending the freeway. After that, it intersects US 23.

=== Portsmouth to West Virginia state line ===
On its way towards the West Huntington Bridge, US 52 meets more state routes in different locations, including SR 823 in Sciotodale. Large portions along the way are limited–access roads. East of Burlington, US 52 then turns south towards the bridge, crossing the Ohio River and the West Virginia state line.

== History ==
With the creation of the "Inter-County Highway" system, two routes were formed along present-day US 52: Inter-County Highways (later State Routes) 7 and 42. In 1923, SR 42 was relocated to Marion-Mount Gilead routing (the new route is now SR 95) as per the highway renumbering. As a result, SR 130 was designated along SR 42's 1912 route.

In 1926, US 52 was formed along with the creation of the U.S. Highway System. The new route roughly travels along its modern-day route. However, both state routes along the route were retained. As a result, the 1927 Ohio state highway renumbering had relocated SR 130 to its current routing and truncated SR 7.

== Major intersections ==
County	Location	mi	km	Exit	Destinations	Notes
Hamilton	Harrison Township	0.000	0.000		I-74 west / US 52 west – Indianapolis	Continuation into Indiana
Hamilton	Harrison	1.600	2.575	1	New Haven Road – Harrison	
Hamilton	Harrison	3.580	5.761	3	Dry Fork Road	
Hamilton	Whitewater Township	5.850	9.415	5	I-275 south – Kentucky	Western end of I-275 concurrency; I-275 exit 25
Hamilton	Whitewater Township	7.760	12.489	7	SR 128 – Cleves, Hamilton, Miamitown	
Hamilton	Colerain Township	9.330	15.015	9	I-275 north to I-75 – Dayton	Eastern end of I-275 concurrency; I-275 exit 28
Hamilton	Green Township	11.160	17.960	11	Rybolt Road, Harrison Pike	
Hamilton	Green Township	14.660	23.593	14	North Bend Road – Cheviot	
Hamilton	Cincinnati	17.440	28.067	17	Montana Avenue	Westbound exit and eastbound entrance
Hamilton	Cincinnati	18.400– 18.520	29.612– 29.805	18	US 27 north (Beekman Street) / Colerain Avenue	Western end of US 27 concurrency; no direct access from I-74/US 52 west to Beekman Street south or from Beekman Street north to I-74/US 52 east, however, a legal U-turn provides indirect access
Hamilton	Cincinnati	19.470	31.334	4	I-75 north – Dayton I-74 ends	Eastern end of I-74 concurrency; western end of I-75 concurrency
Hamilton	Cincinnati	19.930– 20.401	32.074– 32.832	3	I-75 south – Lexington	Eastern end of I-75 concurrency
Hamilton	Cincinnati	20.7	33.3		US 127 north (Central Parkway)	Western end of US 127 concurrency; one-quadrant interchange
Hamilton	Cincinnati	23.3	37.5		Central Parkway (US 42 north)	Western end of US 42 concurrency eastbound
Hamilton	Cincinnati	23.4	37.7		West Ninth Street (US 22 west / SR 3 west)	
Hamilton	Cincinnati	23.5	37.8		US 22 east (US 42 north / West Seventh Street) / SR 3 north	Near western end of US 42 concurrency westbound
Hamilton	Cincinnati	23.7	38.1		I-75 north / US 50 west	On ramps only
Hamilton	Cincinnati	23.9	38.5		US 42 south / US 127 south (West Third Street) to I-71 south / I-75 south	Eastern end of US 42 / US 127 concurrency
Hamilton	Cincinnati	25.227	40.599		East Pete Rose Way (US 27) south	Eastern end of US 27 concurrency
Hamilton	Cincinnati	33.807– 34.207	54.407– 55.051	72	I-275 west to I-471 / Kellogg Avenue – Kentucky	Western end of I-275 concurrency
Hamilton	Anderson Township	35.367– 35.687	56.918– 57.433	71	I-275 to I-71 – Columbus	Eastern end of I-275 concurrency
Hamilton	Anderson Township	35.937– 36.287	57.835– 58.398	—	Kellogg Avenue west	Modified partial cloverleaf interchange
Clermont	Pierce Township	41.657	67.040		SR 749 east (Ten Mile Road) / Ten Mile Road to Palestine Street	Western terminus of SR 749
Clermont	New Richmond	45.607	73.397		SR 132 north (Sycamore Street) / Sycamore Street	Southern terminus of SR 132
Clermont	Point Pleasant	50.587	81.412		SR 232 east – Bethel, Grant Birthplace	Western terminus of SR 232
Clermont	Moscow	53.137	85.516		SR 743 south (Wells Street)	Western end of SR 743 concurrency
Clermont	Washington Township	53.517	86.127		SR 743 north – Point Isabel	Eastern end of SR 743 concurrency
Clermont	Chilo	60.867	97.956		SR 222 (Green Street) – Felicity	
Clermont	Rural	63.657	102.446		SR 133 north – Felicity	Southern terminus of SR 133
Brown	Higginsport	70.161	112.913		SR 505 north	Southern terminus of SR 505
Brown	Higginsport	70.634	113.674		SR 221 north – Georgetown	Southern terminus of SR 221
Brown	Ripley	78.351	126.094		US 62 east / US 68 north	Western end of US 62 / US 68 concurrency
Brown	Aberdeen	84.106– 84.111	135.355– 135.364		US 62 Detour west / US 68 south (William H. Harsha Bridge)	Eastern end of US 68 concurrency
Brown	Aberdeen	86.281	138.856		SR 41 north (Market Street) / Market Street – West Union	Southern terminus of SR 41
Brown	Aberdeen	86.546	139.282		US 62 west (Simon Kenton Memorial Bridge) – Maysville	Eastern end of US 62 concurrency; 15-ton limit imposed on Simon Kenton Memorial Bridge
Adams	Manchester	97.293	156.578		SR 136 north (Jack Roush Way) / East Front Street – West Union	Southern terminus of SR 136
Adams	Monroe Township	102.500	164.958		SR 247 – Wrightsville, West Union	
Scioto	Friendship	131.368	211.416		SR 125 west	Eastern terminus of SR 125
Scioto	Washington Township	135.718– 136.038	218.417– 218.932	Western end of freeway		
Scioto	Washington Township	135.718– 136.038	218.417– 218.932	—	SR 239 north – West Portsmouth	Diamond interchange; southern terminus of SR 239
Scioto	Washington Township	136.508– 136.998	219.688– 220.477	—	US 23 Truck south / SR 73 / SR 104 / SR 852 – Hillsboro, Kentucky	Western end of US 23 Truck concurrency; partial cloverleaf interchange fused with other ramps
Scioto	Washington Township	136.508– 136.998	219.688– 220.477	Eastern end of freeway		
Scioto	Portsmouth	138.028– 138.128	222.135– 222.295		US 23 (Chillicothe Street / Gay Street)	Eastern end of US 23 Truck concurrency; northern terminus of US 23 Truck; this is made up of separate one-way intersections
Scioto	New Boston	141.778	228.170		SR 139 north (Park Avenue)	Southern terminus of SR 139
Scioto	New Boston	143.608	231.115	Western end of freeway		
Scioto	Sciotoville	143.608	231.115	143	SR 335 north (Gallia Street) / Winchester Avenue	Eastbound exit only; southern terminus of SR 335
Scioto	Sciotoville	143.938– 144.108	231.646– 231.919	143	SR 335 (Gallia Street / Harding Avenue) / Gallia Street – Sciotoville	Westbound exit and entrance only
Scioto	Sciotoville	144.838	233.094	144	SR 140 east to SR 823 north – South Webster, Chillicothe	Diamond interchange; western terminus of SR 140; SR 823 and Chillicothe are not signed westbound
Scioto	Sciotodale	145.098	233.513	145	SR 823 north – Chillicothe	Westbound exit and eastbound entrance; southern terminus of SR 823
Scioto	Wheelersburg	146.718	236.120	146	Center Street - Wheelersburg	Diamond interchange
Scioto	Porter Township	149.458	240.529	149	SR 522 east / Hayport Road	Diamond interchange; western terminus of SR 522
Scioto	Green Township	152.498	245.422	152	SR 253 west / Gallia Pike to US 23 / AA Hwy (KY 10) – Greenup	Diamond interchange; eastern terminus of SR 253
Scioto	Green Township	152.968	246.178	153	Old US 52 / CR 1	Eastbound left exit and westbound left entrance
Scioto	Green Township	152.968	246.178	Eastern end of freeway; western end of expressway		
Scioto	Green Township	157.058	252.760		Haverhill–Ohio Furnace Road (CR 8) – Haverhill	Only intersection between the interchanges to the west and east
Lawrence	Hamilton Township	160.008	257.508	—	CR 1A / CR 23	Diamond interchange
Lawrence	Hamilton Township	160.748	258.699		Patrick Street (TR 1117)	These 3 are the only intersections between the interchanges to the west and east
Lawrence	Hanging Rock	161.248	259.504		Happy Hollow Road (TR 330)	
Lawrence	Hanging Rock	161.848	260.469		Rock Hollow Road	
Lawrence	Hanging Rock	162.628	261.724	—	SR 650 north / US 52 Bus. east – Hanging Rock, Ironton	Diamond interchange; southern terminus of SR 650; western terminus of US 52 Bus
Lawrence	Hamilton Township	163.058	262.416		Noble Hill Road (TR 277)	These 3 are the only intersections between the interchanges to the west and east
Lawrence	Hamilton Township	163.688	263.430		Rock Avenue	
Lawrence	Upper Township	164.258	264.348		Deep Cut Road (TR 183)	
Lawrence	Ironton–Upper Township line	165.288	266.005	Eastern end of expressway; western end of freeway		
Lawrence	Ironton–Upper Township line	165.288	266.005	—	SR 93 (Park Avenue / Park Drive) – Ironton, Jackson	Partial cloverleaf interchange
Lawrence	Ironton–Upper Township line	166.388	267.776	—	SR 141 east (Campbell Drive) / Liberty Avenue – Ironton	Diamond interchange; western terminus of SR 141
Lawrence	Coal Grove	168.468	271.123	—	SR 243 east / US 52 Bus. west (Marion Pike) – Coal Grove, Ironton	Diamond interchange; western terminus of SR 243; eastern terminus of US 52 Bus
Lawrence	Coal Grove	169.618– 169.648	272.974– 273.022	—	Ashland KY (SR 652 south)	Inverted SPUI/continuous green T hybrid interchange; northern terminus of SR 652
Lawrence	Coal Grove	169.618– 169.648	272.974– 273.022	Eastern end of freeway; western end of expressway		
Lawrence	Perry Township	170.648	274.631		Crabtree Hollow Road (TR 268)	These 5 are the only intersections between the interchanges to the west and east
Lawrence	Perry Township	171.668	276.273		CR 1 / Old US 52	
Lawrence	Perry Township	171.988	276.788		Lick Creek Road (CR 15)	
Lawrence	Perry Township	173.378	279.025		Grandview Avenue (CR 450)	First traffic lights since Portsmouth
Lawrence	Perry Township	173.758	279.636		Delta Lane (CR 60)	Traffic lights
Lawrence	South Point	175.448	282.356	—	Solida Road - South Point	Hybrid diamond/dumbbell interchange
Lawrence	Fayette Township	177.758	286.074		Dallas–Matthew Pike	Intersection
Lawrence	Fayette Township	178.278	286.911		Burlington–Macedonia Road (CR 120)	These 4 intersections are all controlled by traffic lights leading to commercial development; US 52 maintains its expressway character with no commercial driveways
Lawrence	Fayette Township	178.788	287.731		Sam's Wal-Mart Way (CR 410)	
Lawrence	Fayette Township	179.398	288.713		Sandusky Road (TR 276)	
Lawrence	Fayette Township	179.868	289.469		Charlie Creek Road (CR 144)	
Lawrence	Union Township	180.638– 180.668	290.709– 290.757	—	SR 7 north – Chesapeake	Trumpet interchange; the roadway continues as SR 7; US 52 east exits onto a two-lane road approaching the bridge; US 52 west merges from the two-lane road; southern terminus of SR 7
Lawrence	Ohio River	180.968	291.240		US 52 east to I-64 / US 60 – Huntington, W VA	Continuation into West Virginia via the West Huntington Bridge
1.000 mi = 1.609 km; 1.000 km = 0.621 mi: Closed/former; Concurrency terminus; Incomplete access

U.S. Route 52
Previous state: Indiana	Ohio	Next state: West Virginia
