= Ohio State Route 222 =

State highway in Clermont County, Ohio, US

State Route 222

Route information
- Maintained by ODOT
- Length: 29.14 mi (46.90 km)
- Existed: 1923–present

Major junctions
- South end: US 52 near Chilo
- North end: US 50 in Batavia

Location
- Country: United States
- State: Ohio
- Counties: Clermont

Highway system
- Ohio State Highway System; Interstate; US; State; Scenic
← SR 221	→ US 223

State Route 222 (SR 222) is a 29.14-mile-long (46.90 km) north–south state highway in the southwestern part of the U.S. state of Ohio. The southern terminus of SR 222 is at U.S. Route 52 (US 52) in the village of Chilo. Its northern terminus is at a signalized T-intersection with US 50 approximately 3.50 miles (5.63 km) northwest of Batavia.

== Route description ==
The entirety of SR 222 is situated within Clermont County. No section of this state route is included within the National Highway System (NHS), a network of highways that are deemed most important for the economy, mobility and defense of the nation.

== History ==
The designation of SR 222 took place in 1923. Originally, the highway was routed from its present southern terminus in Chilo to its junction with the former SR 25 in Monroe Township. SR 222 was extended to the north in 1937, traveling from SR 125 in Batavia Township to its current northern terminus at US 50.

== Major intersections ==
The entire route is in Clermont County.

Location	mi	km	Destinations	Notes
Chilo	0.00	0.00	US 52 (Main Street) / Green Street – New Richmond, Higginsport	Southern terminus
Franklin Township	3.36	5.41	SR 133 south	Southern end of SR 133 concurrency
Felicity	4.71	7.58	SR 133 north / SR 756 east (Light Street)	Northern end of SR 133 concurrency; southern end of SR 756 concurrency
Felicity	4.99	8.03	SR 756 west (Light Street) / Mulberry Street	Northern end of SR 756 concurrency
Washington Township	9.52	15.32	SR 743 west (Bees Run Road) – Moscow	Eastern terminus of SR 743
Tate Township	11.83	19.04	SR 232 south / Salt Air Road – Point Pleasant	Southern end of SR 232 concurrency
Tate Township	12.56	20.21	SR 232 north	Northern end of SR 232 concurrency
Batavia Township	17.95	28.89	SR 125 east – Bethel	Southern end of SR 125 concurrency
Batavia Township	19.41	31.24	SR 125 west (Ohio Pike) – Amelia	Northern end of SR 125 concurrency
Batavia	25.00	40.23	SR 132 south – UC Clermont	Southern end of SR 132 concurrency
Batavia	25.67	41.31	SR 32 / SR 132 north – Williamsburg, Cincinnati, Owensville	Interchange; northern end of SR 132 concurrency
Stonelick Township	29.14	46.90	US 50 – Owensville, Milford	
1.000 mi = 1.609 km; 1.000 km = 0.621 mi: Concurrency terminus
