= Ohio State Route 743 =

State highway in Clermont County, Ohio, US

State Route 743

Route information
- Maintained by ODOT
- Length: 6.76 mi (10.88 km)
- Existed: 1937–present

Major junctions
- West end: 5th Street in Moscow
- US 52 in Moscow
- East end: SR 222 near Felicity

Location
- Country: United States
- State: Ohio
- Counties: Clermont

Highway system
- Ohio State Highway System; Interstate; US; State; Scenic
← SR 741	→ SR 744

State Route 743 (SR 743) is a short east–west state highway in southwestern Ohio, a U.S. state. The highway's western terminus is in the village of Moscow at the intersection of Wells Street and 5th Street, a mere two blocks off of U.S. Route 52 (US 52). Traversing Clermont County's Moscow and Washington Township, SR 743 ultimately arrives at its eastern terminus at SR 222 approximately four and a half miles (7.2 km) northwest of Felicity.

Situated in southern Clermont County, SR 743 came into existence in the late 1930s when many highways numbered in the 500s, 600s and 700s were designated throughout Ohio. The highway generally exists now as it did when it was first designated.

== Route description ==
All of SR 743 is located in southern Clermont County. No portion of this state highway is incorporated within the National Highway System.

Starting from the intersection of 5th Street and Wells Street in the village of Moscow approximately four blocks east of the Ohio River, SR 743 follows Wells Street east two blocks through a residential area to the US 52 junction. SR 743 overlaps US 52 heading south for nearly zero point four miles (0.64 km) into rural Washington Township. The state highway then splits from US 52, and heads east into a predominantly forested setting, with the occasional house appearing along the side of the roadway. SR 743 curves its way around, but in a generally easterly trend, through its intersection with Fruit Ridge Road. The highway then starts to bend into a more northeastern direction, as it meets Brown Road and then passes underneath the Haul Road for the nearby William H. Zimmer Power Station. Some open grassy knolls start to line the sides of SR 743 amidst the forested terrain as the highway makes its way up to its junction with SR 756. Continuing northeast, SR 743 passes a mix of grassy fields and tree patches, with houses appearing here and there. Ultimately, SR 743 turns due east, and follows this path to its intersection with Bees Run Road in the residential hamlet of Point Isabel. The highway turns due north there, and continues in that direction through its endpoint at SR 222.

== History ==
SR 743 was first designated in 1937 along the routing through Moscow and Washington Township in Clermont County that it occupies today. No changes of major significance have taken place to the routing of this state highway since its creation.

== Major intersections ==
The entire route is in Clermont County.

Location	mi	km	Destinations	Notes
Moscow	0.00	0.00	5th Street / Wells Street	
Moscow	0.07	0.11	US 52 west – New Richmond	Western end of US 52 concurrency
Washington Township	0.45	0.72	US 52 east – Neville	Eastern end of US 52 concurrency
Washington Township	3.76	6.05	SR 756 – Point Pleasant, Felicity	
Washington Township	6.76	10.88	SR 222 / West Street – Felicity	
1.000 mi = 1.609 km; 1.000 km = 0.621 mi: Concurrency terminus
