= Ohio State Route 232 =

State highway in Clermont County, Ohio, US

State Route 232

Route information
- Maintained by ODOT
- Length: 11.46 mi (18.44 km)
- Existed: 1930–present

Major junctions
- West end: US 52 in Point Pleasant
- East end: SR 125 near Bethel

Location
- Country: United States
- State: Ohio
- Counties: Clermont

Highway system
- Ohio State Highway System; Interstate; US; State; Scenic
← SR 231	→ SR 233

State Route 232 (SR 232, OH 232) is an east–west state highway situated in the southwestern corner of the U.S. state of Ohio. The western terminus of State Route 232 is at a T-intersection with U.S. Route 52 in the unincorporated community of Point Pleasant near the Ohio River. The eastern terminus of this highway is at a signalized intersection with State Route 125 in the village of Bethel.

== Route description ==
All of State Route 232 lies within the southern part of Clermont County. There are no segments of this highway that are included within the National Highway System.

== History ==
This state highway made its debut in 1930 along the routing that it occupies to this day between Point Pleasant and Bethel. No changes of major significance have taken place to State Route 232 since its inception.

== Major intersections ==
The entire route is in Clermont County.

Location	mi	km	Destinations	Notes
Monroe Township	0.00	0.00	US 52	
Monroe Township	1.41	2.27	SR 756 east – Felicity	Western terminus of SR 756
Tate Township	6.74	10.85	SR 222 south – Felicity	Western end of SR 222 concurrency
Tate Township	7.47	12.02	SR 222 north – Batavia	Eastern end of SR 222 concurrency
Bethel	11.46	18.44	SR 125 (West Plane Street)	
1.000 mi = 1.609 km; 1.000 km = 0.621 mi: Concurrency terminus

== See also ==
- State Route 232 (1923)
