= Ohio State Route 125 =

State highway in southwestern Ohio, US

State Route 125

Route information
- Maintained by ODOT
- Length: 85.79 mi (138.07 km)
- Existed: 1926–present

Major junctions
- West end: US 50 / SR 561 in Cincinnati
- I-275 in Withamsville; US 68 near Georgetown; US 62 in Russelville
- East end: US 52 in Friendship

Location
- Country: United States
- State: Ohio
- Counties: Hamilton, Clermont, Brown, Adams, Scioto

Highway system
- Ohio State Highway System; Interstate; US; State; Scenic
← SR 124	→ SR 126

State Route 125 (SR 125) is an east–west state highway in the southwestern portion of the U.S. state of Ohio. Its western terminus is within the Cincinnati city limits, about 5 miles (8.0 km) east of downtown, at U.S. Route 50 – this is also the western terminus of State Route 32 and the southern terminus of State Route 561. The route’s eastern terminus is at U.S. Route 52 approximately 7 miles (11 km) west of Portsmouth near the village of Friendship.

Heading east from the Cincinnati neighborhoods of Mount Lookout, Linwood, and Mount Washington, State Route 125 passes through numerous subdivisions in Anderson Township as a four lane road, Beechmont Avenue. After the Clermont County line, State Route 125 becomes Ohio Pike, the old Ohio Turnpike, originally built in 1831 by E.G. Penn, not related to the modern highway of the same name. Passing under Interstate 275, State Route 125 begins to lose its suburban feel after the villages of Amelia and Hamlet as it heads into the countryside of eastern Clermont, Brown, Adams, and Scioto Counties.

Near its eastern terminus, the route passes through Shawnee State Forest, the largest in the state of Ohio, and by the Shawnee State Lodge and Park, Roosevelt Lake, and Turkey Creek Lake. This section of State Route 125 is part of the Scenic Scioto Heritage Trail.

See also National Scenic Byway, Ohio Byway, and Shawnee State Forest and Park map

== History ==
- 1926 – Route certified; originally routed from 7 miles (11 km) east of downtown Cincinnati to Friendship along the current U.S. Route 50 from 7 miles (11 km) to 9 miles (14 km) east of downtown Cincinnati, and along its own current alignment from 9 miles (14 km) east of downtown Cincinnati to Friendship; this entire route was State Route 25 before 1926; 7 miles (11 km) to 11 miles (18 km) east of downtown dually certified with the former State Route 74.
- 1946 – Extended to downtown Cincinnati along U.S. Route 50, U.S. Route 52, and State Route 74.
- 1956 – Truncated at 9 miles (14 km) east of downtown Cincinnati.
- 1959 – From its western terminus to Amelia upgraded to 4 lanes.
- 1962 – State Route 74 renumbered to State Route 32.
- 1972 – Amelia to Bethel and 2 miles (3.2 km) west of Georgetown to Georgetown upgraded to divided highway.
- 1997 – From Interstate 275 to Bethel downgraded from divided highway to 4-lane undivided highway.

=== Before 1926 ===
- Routed from LeSourdesville (south of Middletown to Lebanon along current State Route 63.
- 1926 – Entire route certified as State Route 63.

== Major junctions ==
County	Location	mi	km	Destinations	Notes
Hamilton	Cincinnati	0.00– 0.13	0.00– 0.21	US 50 west (Columbia Parkway) / SR 561 north (Linwood Avenue) / SR 32 begins – Downtown Cincinnati	Interchange; no access to US 50 east, from US 50 west; southern terminus of SR 561; western end of SR 32 concurrency
Hamilton	Cincinnati	0.38– 0.42	0.61– 0.68	Wilmer Avenue / Wooster Road – Lunken Airport	
Hamilton	Anderson Township	1.40– 1.60	2.25– 2.57	SR 32 east – Newtown, Batavia	Interchange; eastern end of SR 32 concurrency
Clermont	Union Township	8.15– 8.43	13.12– 13.57	I-275 to US 52 / I-71 – Kentucky, Columbus	Exit 65 (I-275)
Clermont	Pierce–Batavia township line	14.51	23.35	SR 132 south – New Richmond	Western end of SR 132 concurrency
Clermont	Pierce–Batavia township line	14.83	23.87	SR 132 north – Batavia	Eastern end of SR 132 concurrency
Clermont	Monroe–Batavia township line	16.41	26.41	SR 222 south	Western end of SR 222 concurrency
Clermont	Tate Township	17.87	28.76	SR 222 north / Bantam Road	Eastern end of SR 222 concurrency
Clermont	Bethel	22.18	35.70	SR 232 south – Point Pleasant	Northern terminus of SR 232
Clermont	Bethel	22.56	36.31	SR 133 (Main Street)	
Brown	Hamersville	28.67	46.14	SR 774 (Orchard Street)	
Brown	Clark Township	30.03	48.33	SR 505 south / Feesburg Road	Northern terminus of SR 505
Brown	Georgetown	34.48	55.49	SR 221 south (West Grant Avenue) – Higginsport	Northern terminus of SR 221
Brown	Pleasant Township	36.52	58.77	US 68 north – Mt. Orab	Western end of US 68 concurrency
Brown	Pleasant Township	37.54	60.41	US 68 south – Ripley	Eastern end of US 68 concurrency
Brown	Russellville	41.54	66.85	US 62 (Columbus Street)	
Brown	Byrd Township	47.17– 47.21	75.91– 75.98	SR 353 west / SR 763 south	Eastern terminus of SR 353 / northern terminus of SR 763
Adams	Liberty Township	53.51	86.12	SR 136 – Cherry Fork, Manchester	
Adams	West Union	57.05	91.81	SR 41 south (Manchester Street) / Walnut Street – Bentonville, Aberdeen	Western end of SR 41 concurrency
Adams	West Union	57.27	92.17	SR 247 north (Cross Street)	Western end of SR 241 concurrency
Adams	West Union	57.42	92.41	SR 247 south (2nd Street)	Eastern end of SR 241 concurrency
Adams	West Union	57.83	93.07	SR 41 north (Main Street) / Wilson Drive – Peebles	Eastern end of SR 41 concurrency
Adams	Tiffin Township	63.32	101.90	SR 348 east	Western terminus of SR 348
Scioto	Nile Township	85.79	138.07	US 52 – Rome, Portsmouth	
1.000 mi = 1.609 km; 1.000 km = 0.621 mi: Concurrency terminus
