= Ohio State Route 133 =

State highway in southwestern Ohio, US

State Route 133

Route information
- Maintained by ODOT
- Length: 49.40 mi (79.50 km)
- Existed: 1923–present

Major junctions
- South end: US 52 near Felicity
- SR 32 in Williamsburg; US 50 near Newtonsville
- North end: SR 132 / SR 350 in Clarksville

Location
- Country: United States
- State: Ohio
- Counties: Clermont, Warren, Clinton

Highway system
- Ohio State Highway System; Interstate; US; State; Scenic
← SR 132	→ SR 134

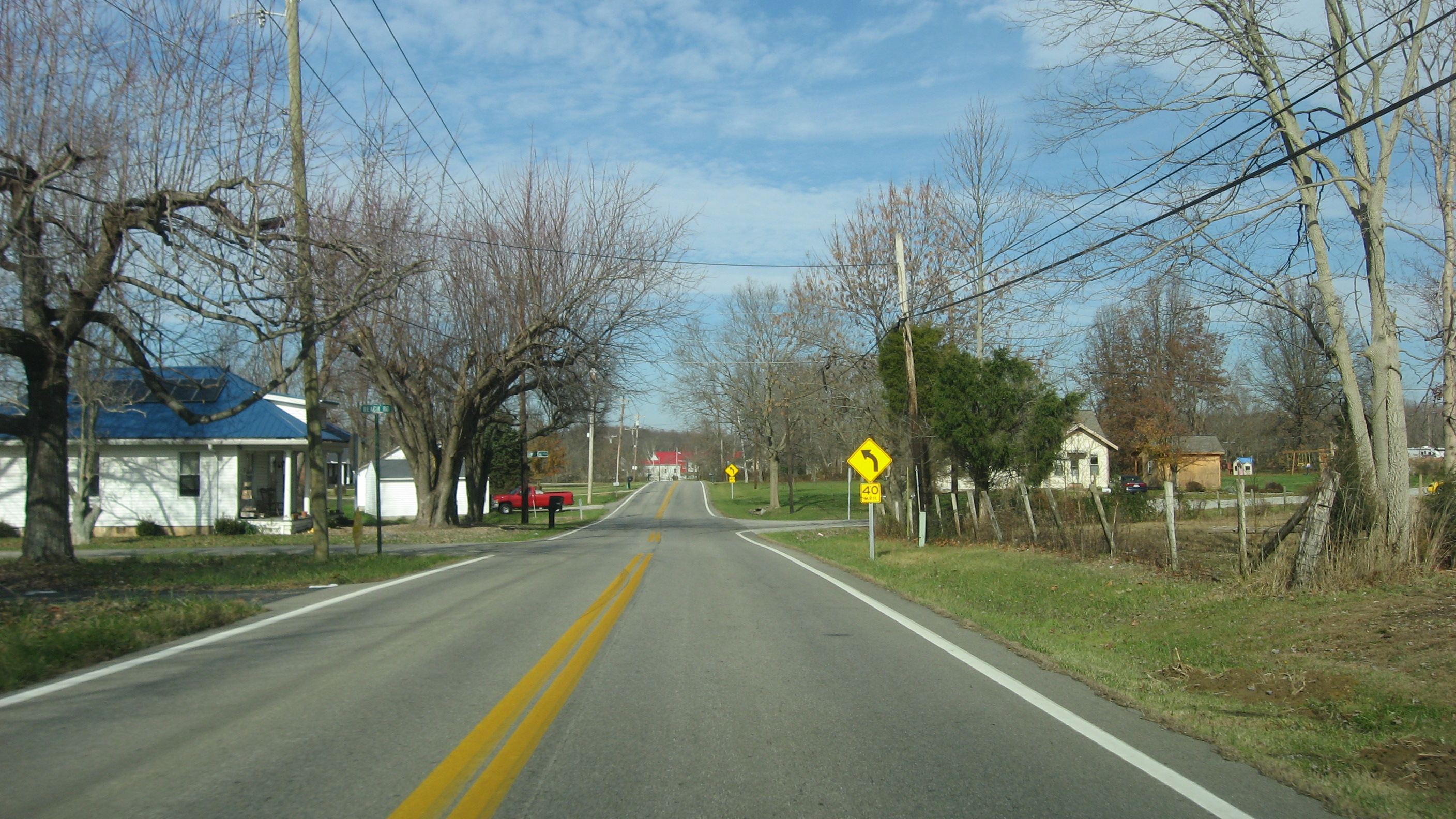
State Route 133 at Mount Olive in Clermont County

State Route 133 (SR 133) is a north–south state highway in the southwestern portion of the U.S. state of Ohio. Its southern terminus is at its interchange with U.S. Route 52 near Felicity and its northern terminus is at its interchange with SR 350 in Clarksville.

== History ==
SR 133 was commissioned in 1923, between Chilo and Bethel. On the route of current SR 222 from Chilo to Felicity and its current route between Felicity and Bethel. In 1926 the highway was extended north to Owensville, passing through Williamsburg. The route was moved onto its current route south of Felicity in 1930, switching routes with SR 222. In that same year the route was extended north to Blanchester. On March 9, 1932 the highway was extended north to Clarksville.

== Major intersections ==
County	Location	mi	km	Destinations	Notes
Clermont	Franklin Township	0.00	0.00	US 52	Southern terminus of SR 133
Clermont	Franklin Township	3.27	5.26	SR 222 south	Southern end of SR 222 concurrency
Clermont	Felicity	4.62	7.44	SR 222 north / SR 756 west	Northern terminus of SR 222; southern end of SR 756
Clermont	Felicity	4.68	7.53	SR 756 east	Northern end of SR 756 concurrency
Clermont	Franklin Township	6.50	10.46	SR 774 north	Southern terminus of SR 774
Clermont	Bethel	13.40	21.57	SR 125	
Clermont	Williamsburg	21.12	33.99	SR 276 begins	Southern end of SR 276 concurrency; southern terminus of SR 276
Clermont	Williamsburg	21.63	34.81	SR 276 north	Northern end of SR 276 concurrency
Clermont	Williamsburg	22.12	35.60	SR 32	
Clermont	Jackson Township	28.00	45.06	US 50	
Clermont	Wayne Township	31.16	50.15	SR 131	
Clermont	Wayne Township	34.57	55.64	SR 727 south	Northern terminus of SR 727
Warren	No major junctions				
Clinton	Blanchester	40.38	64.99	SR 123 south	Southern end of SR 123 concurrency
Clinton	Blanchester	40.50	65.18	SR 28 / SR 123 north	Northern end of SR 123 concurrency
Clinton	Marion Township	43.75	70.41	SR 730 north	Southern terminus of SR 730
Warren	Washington Township	47.71	76.78	SR 132 south	Southern end of SR 132 concurrency
Clinton	Clarksville	49.40	79.50	SR 132 ends / SR 350	Northern end of SR 132 concurrency; northern terminus of SR 132; northern terminus of SR 133
1.000 mi = 1.609 km; 1.000 km = 0.621 mi: Concurrency terminus
