= William H. Zimmer Power Station =

Coal power plant in Clermont County, Ohio

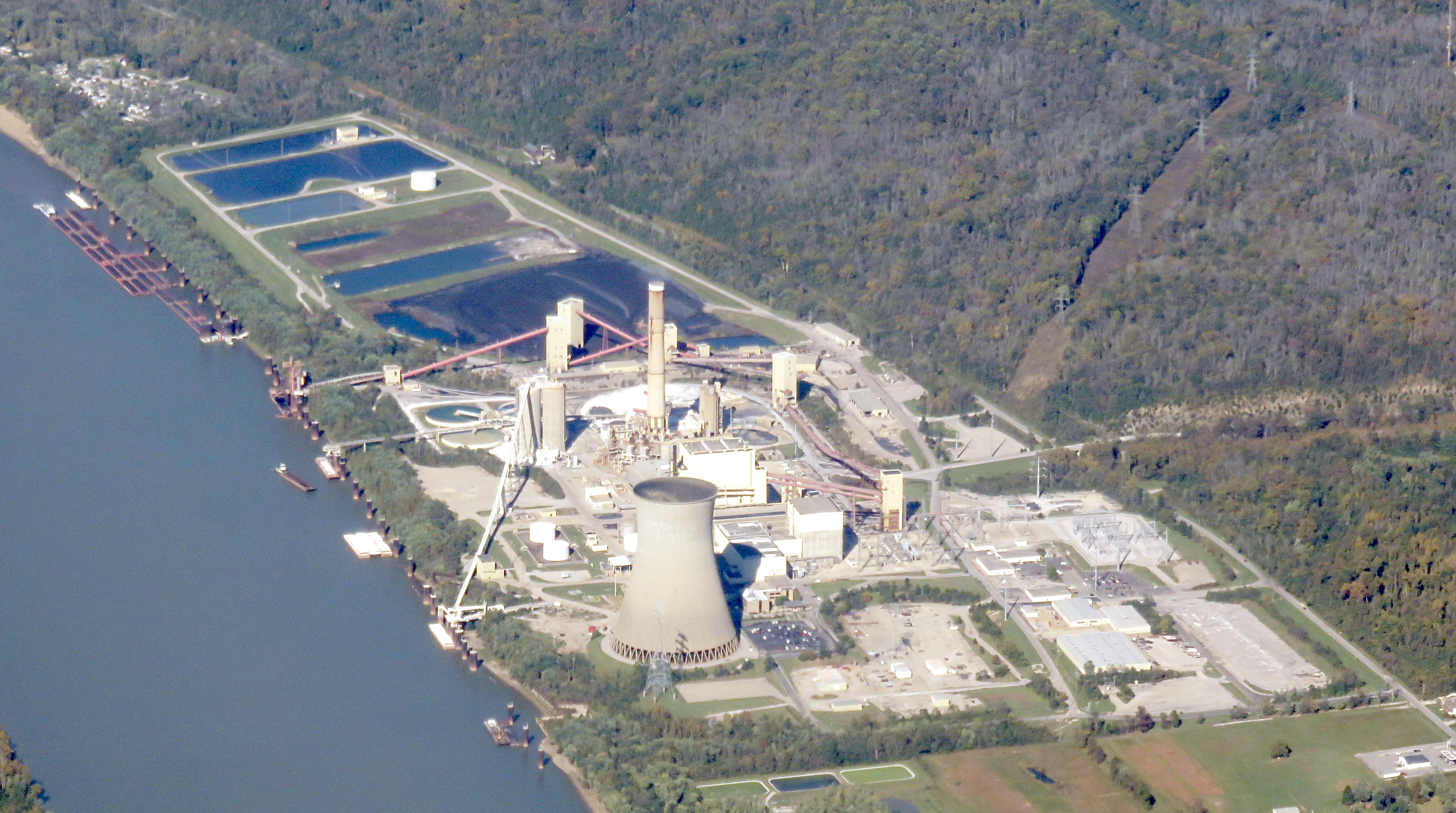
- William H. Zimmer Power Station in 2017
- Country: United States
- Location: Washington Township, Clermont County, near Moscow, Ohio
- Coordinates: 38°51′59″N 84°13′41″W
- Status: Decommissioned
- Commission date: 1991
- Decommission date: May 31, 2022
- Owner: Vistra Corp

Thermal power station
- Primary fuel: Coal
- Cooling source: Ohio River

Power generation
- Units operational: 1 x 1351 MW (gross)
- Units cancelled: 1 × 840 MW BWR; 1 × 1,170 MW BWR
- Nameplate capacity: 1,305 MW
- Capacity factor: 61,1% (2014–2018)
- Annual net output: 6,989 GW·h

External links
- Commons: Related media on Commons

The William H. Zimmer Power Station, located near Moscow, Ohio, was a 1.35-gigawatt (1,351 MW) coal power plant. Planned by Cincinnati Gas and Electric (CG&E) (a forerunner of Duke Energy), with Columbus & Southern Ohio Electric (a forerunner of American Electric Power (AEP)) and Dayton Power & Light (DP&L) as its partners, it was originally intended to be a nuclear power plant. Although once estimated to be 97% complete, poor construction and quality assurance (QA) led to the plant being converted to coal-fired generation. The plant began operations in 1991. Vistra Corp. acquired ownership in 2018 and operated the plant until its closure on May 31, 2022.

== History ==
=== Construction ===
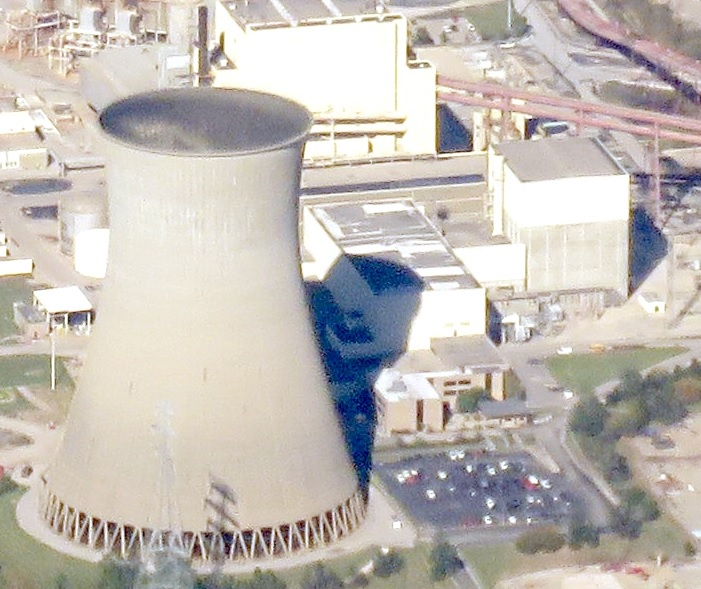
The mothballed containment building (right) that was supposed to house an active nuclear reactor.

The construction of Zimmer was a consortium of CG&E, Columbus & Southern Ohio Electric, and DP&L. The project was announced in 1969 with a cost of $420 million to construct two 840 MW nuclear power units with completion dates set for 1975 and 1976. The plant is named after William H. Zimmer, who was chairman and president of CG&E from 1962 to 1973 and was also an uncle to Major League Baseball's Don Zimmer. Construction of the plant did not start until 1972 because the Atomic Energy Commission (AEC) demanded stricter standards to approve of nuclear plants. The second proposed unit was upgraded from 840 MW to 1,170 MW in 1974. General Electric's BWRs were chosen for the plant's nuclear reactors. Ultimately, the second unit was never constructed due to regulatory issues and costs.

An investigation into the construction of Zimmer began in 1978. A worker charged that a welding contractor did defective work below nuclear safety standards. CG&E's lawyers placed blame on the contractor for not picking up on the defective work. In 1980 the Chicago Sun-Times reported accusations of a cover-up by CG&E of time-card falsifications and the installation of defective piping in one of the plant's safety systems. As a result, the Nuclear Regulatory Commission (NRC) fined CG&E $200,000 for a faulty quality assurance program in 1981. The constructor was The Henry J. Kaiser Company, the construction arm of Kaiser Engineers whereas the primary owner, CG&E, did its own procurement, awarding contracts for equipment, and quality assurance requirements. The NRC, under pressure from the Government Accountability Project (GAP) to reopen the investigation, eventually ordered work on the nuclear reactor to halt in 1982. The Federal Bureau of Investigation (FBI) launched an investigation into the plant's safety records and harassment of inspectors.

CG&E, AEP and DP&L announced the cancellation of the Zimmer Nuclear Power Plant in 1983. Zimmer's total sunk costs amounted to roughly $1.6 billion; CG&E's share was $716 million, nearly 90% of the utility's 1982 net worth. Retired Navy Admiral Joe Williams Jr. was hired to bring the plant on-line, and Bechtel was retained to nuclear-qualify the plant. Bechtel came in with an estimate of more than $1.5 billion—beyond the $1.6 billion already spent—to adequately complete the plant.

=== Conversion to Coal ===
Originally expected to cost $240 million for one unit, when the cost estimate soared to at least $3.1 billion, the decision was made in January 1984 to convert the mothballed plant into a coal-fired generated plant. Sargent & Lundy, who was the architect/engineering firm, and General Electric were sued by the three utilities in July 1984. The utilities sought $400 million in damages asserting the defective equipment caused extra costs for the construction of Zimmer. The lawsuit was settled in November 1987 with Sargent & Lundy agreeing to pay $27.4 million to the utilities. The utilities agreed to pay $12.7 million to Sargent & Lundy.

The conversion process of Zimmer into a coal power plant began in March 1987. During the conversion of the plant from nuclear to coal, the Little Indian Creek was routed through the plant to protect fish populations. The plant now has several unique environmental protection features to keep the creek at its natural state. In addition, mussels along the riverbed at Zimmer were relocated upstream. After $3.3 billion in expenditures, the world's first nuclear-to-coal power plant was completed in 1991.

A tornado struck Zimmer on March 2, 2012 causing damages to surrounding buildings at the plant and electrical towers; fortunately no one at the plant was injured. The power plant continued generating electricity as repairs were made.

Duke Energy sold its stake in Zimmer to Dynegy in 2014. AEP sold its 25% stake in Zimmer to Dynegy for a swap of Dynegy's stake in Conesville Power Plant in February 2017. In April 2017, Dynegy was given sole ownership of Zimmer when DP&L announced it would sell its 28% stake to Dynegy. Zimmer would become owned by Vistra Energy after Vistra's merger with Dynegy in 2018.

In March 2020, Vistra Energy would settle with the Environmental Protection Agency (EPA) over a period of two decades of exceeding its emission operating limits. Vistra would pay a $600,000 fine to the Department of Justice (DOJ), retrofit $45,000 in energy efficient lighting at a nearby school, and replace three school buses that are cleaner-burning.

=== Retirement ===
In September 2020, Vistra announced it would be retiring the Zimmer plant by year-end 2027.

On July 19, 2021, Vistra announced the plant will shut down five years earlier, on May 31, 2022, because they failed to secure any capacity revenues in the May 2021 wholesale electricity market auction held by the grid operator, PJM Interconnection.

The Zimmer coal-fired power plant closed on May 31, 2022.

== Equipment ==
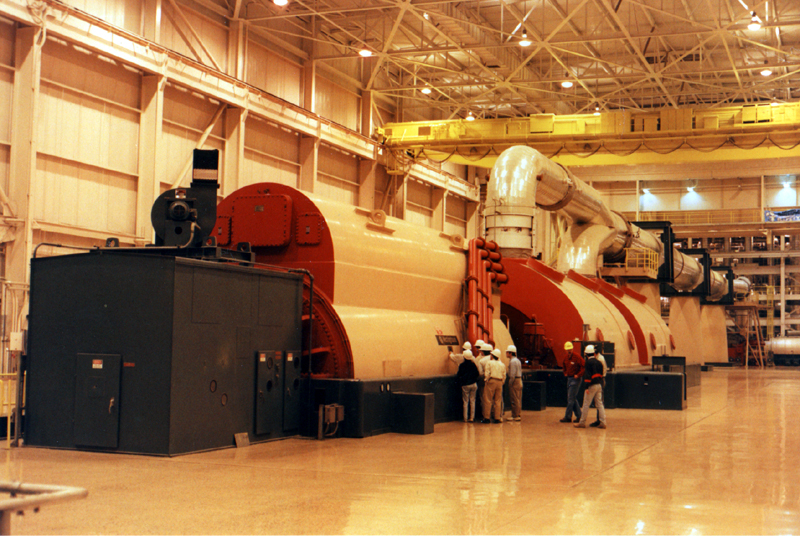
The plant's generator and turbine in 1993.

Zimmer utilizes equipment from the old nuclear plant in conjunction with the coal conversion equipment. The original Westinghouse high-pressure/low-pressure turbine was modified and the high-pressure section was removed. The General Electric reactor was to generate 840 MW per the original nuclear design. ASEA Brown Boveri (ABB) was contracted to design the high-pressure turbine, intermediate-pressure/reheat turbine and generator. The HP/IP generator produces 900 MW and the Westinghouse LP generator produces 497 MW. The plant's feedwater pump is powered by a turbine. The feedwater turbine was designed by ABB and generates 50,000 kW (67,000 hp).

The boiler, designed by Babcock & Wilcox, is a supercritical steam generator with a maximum pressure of about 3,845 psi (26,510 kPa) and temperature of about 1,010 °F (543 °C). The reheat section of the boiler operates at about 1,000 °F (538 °C).

The plant also uses several environmental controls such as selective catalytic reduction (SCRs) to reduce nitrogen oxide (NO_{x}) emissions, electrostatic precipitators to remove fly ash, and a flue-gas desulfurization (FGD) system which removes up to 98% of the sulfur dioxide (SO_{2}) emissions. The gypsum byproduct of the FGD system is sold to make drywall.

The plant's cooling tower was designed to handle the cooling for the original nuclear plant. This creates generating efficiency issues during very hot summer days, as the cooling tower must cool much more equipment than it was originally designed for. A 573 ft (175 m) smokestack was constructed for discharging the flue gas.

== See also ==
- Beckjord Power Station
- List of power stations in Ohio
- List of canceled nuclear plants in the United States
