= Ohio State Route 505 =

State highway in Brown County, Ohio, US

State Route 505

Route information
- Maintained by ODOT
- Length: 10.39 mi (16.72 km)
- Existed: 1937–present

Major junctions
- South end: US 52 in Higginsport
- North end: SR 125 near Hamersville

Location
- Country: United States
- State: Ohio
- Counties: Brown

Highway system
- Ohio State Highway System; Interstate; US; State; Scenic
← SR 504	→ SR 506

State Route 505 (SR 505) is a north–south highway in the southwestern quadrant of the U.S. state of Ohio. This state highway runs from its southern terminus at a T-intersection with U.S. Route 52 (US 52) in the western half of the village of Higginsport to its northern terminus at SR 125 just 0.50 miles (0.80 km) southeast of Hamersville.

== Route description ==
All of SR 505 is situated within the southwestern corner of Brown County. This route is not included as a part of the National Highway System, a network of highways identified as being most important for the country's economy, mobility and defense.

== History ==
The SR 505 designation was assigned in 1937. For the duration of its history, SR 505 has maintained the same routing between US 52 in Higginsport and SR 125 near Hamersville.

In 1940, when SR 756 was extended east from Felicity to connect to SR 505 at the point that marks its current eastern terminus. At that time, however, SR 756 was extended northeast to run concurrently with SR 505 to a common terminus at SR 125. This would remain the case until 1995, when the SR 756 concurrency was removed from SR 505, resulting in SR 756 having a new eastern terminus where it currently does at SR 505. In addition, SR 505 was re-instated to its 1937–1940 status of being free of a concurrency for its entire length.

In 2015, Coopers Excavating replaced a bridge located at the 7.24 mile marker. Coopers Excavating was awarded the contract to replace the bridge for a total of $304,522. The construction started on August 24 and concluded roughly 60 days later.

== Major intersections ==
The entire route is in Brown County.

Location	mi	km	Destinations	Notes
Higginsport	0.00	0.00	US 52 (Columbia Street) – Ripley, Chilo	
Lewis Township	6.72	10.81	SR 756 west	Eastern terminus of SR 756
Clark Township	10.39	16.72	SR 125 / Feesburg Road	
1.000 mi = 1.609 km; 1.000 km = 0.621 mi
