= Clermont County Public Library =

Public library system in Ohio, US

- Location: Clermont County, Ohio, United States
- Established: 1955
- Branches: 10

Access and use
- Circulation: More than 1.8 million in 2025
- Population served: 197,363

Other information
- Director: Andrea Brofft
- Employees: More than 100
- Website: Clermont County Public Library

The Clermont County Public Library is a public library system in Clermont County, Ohio, located east of Hamilton County and within the greater Cincinnati area. There are ten library branches in the system: Amelia, Batavia, Bethel, Felicity, Goshen, Milford, New Richmond, Owensville, Union Township, and Williamsburg.

== History ==
In 1948 Clermont County residents approved a vote to create a public library system. A seven-member board of trustees was appointed in 1949, and library services began in 1955, after funds were raised from personal property taxes (a local tax on stocks and bonds).

Leo Meirose, Director of the library system from 1982 to 1989, was instrumental in the passage of a local levy aimed at expanding the amount of branches in the system in an attempt to provide library branch locations within 15 minutes of all Clermont County residents.

The branches of the Clermont County Public Library include:

- Amelia Branch opened to the public on March 27, 1988. 39°01′42″N 84°13′20″W
- Batavia Branch opened in 1961 and was renamed in 1990 for Doris E. Wood, the library's first head librarian. This building originally included four apartments that generated money for the library. 39°04′28″N 84°10′40″W
- Bethel Branch opened on August 22, 1967. Prior to this, the building had been home to a private community library, which had opened in 1929. Since the Bethel branch's transition to a member on the Clermont County Public Library system, the branch has moved twice, once in 1985 and most recently in 2005. 38°57′50″N 84°05′23″W
- Felicity Branch opened January 30, 1994. 38°50′04″N 84°05′56″W
- Goshen Branch opened on October 29, 1989. 39°13′36″N 84°09′48″W
- Milford Branch opened in 1959 as the first walk-in location in location of the library system. This branch has moved twice since its creation, and was renamed the Milford-Miami Township Branch upon the second move in 1997. 39°10′28″N 84°14′24″W
- New Richmond Branch opened in 1980 and has moved three times since its creation. 38°58′13″N 84°17′05″W
- Owensville Branch opened August 25, 1997 and was the last of the current ten branches to have been built. 39°07′31″N 84°07′30″W
- Union Township Branch opened in 1963. In 2012 this branch moved to a new, larger location. 39°05′47″N 84°15′43″W
- Williamsburg Branch opened in 1988 and was renamed the Marion G. Croswell branch in 2007 in honor of Croswell's years as a library board member. 39°03′24″N 84°03′25″W
