= Ohio State Route 276 =

State highway in Clermont County, Ohio, US

State Route 276

Route information
- Maintained by ODOT
- Length: 6.46 mi (10.40 km)
- Existed: 1930–present

Major junctions
- South end: SR 133 in Williamsburg
- North end: US 50 / SR 132 in Owensville

Location
- Country: United States
- State: Ohio
- Counties: Clermont

Highway system
- Ohio State Highway System; Interstate; US; State; Scenic
← SR 275	→ I-277

State Route 276 (SR 276) is a 6.46-mile (10.40 km) long state highway located entirely in Clermont County, Ohio. The route runs from an intersection with West Main Street (SR 133) and 5th Street in Williamsburg to US 50 and SR 132 in Owensville.

== Route description ==
SR 276 begins at an intersection with West Main Street and 5th Street in downtown Williamsburg. In this area, SR 133 is routed along West Main Street; Fifth Street west of here and Main Street east of here formerly carried SR 32 before it was rerouted onto the Corridor D expressway in the 1970s. SR 133 and SR 276 travel concurrently heading northwest through Williamsburg. After 0.5 miles (0.80 km), SR 133 turns north onto Tollgate Road leaving SR 276 to continue northwest into Williamsburg Township. After passing through the residential neighborhoods of Williamsburg, the road enters into a mixture of houses and farmland. SR 276 passes under the SR 32 expressway just outside the village but without a direct interchange. After about 5 miles (8.0 km), SR 276 curves to the north towards Owensville. About 0.3 miles (0.48 km) before its terminus, SR 132 joins SR 276 from the southwest at the Owensville village limits. In the center of Owensville, the two routes intersect US 50 (Main Street). At this intersection, SR 276 ends, but SR 132 continues by turning left onto US 50 west.

No part of SR 276 is a part of the National Highway System.

== History ==
The highway connecting Williamsburg and Owensville has been a part of the state highway system since 1915. The former route numbers of this highway include SR 480 (c. 1915–1922), SR 132 (1923–1925), and SR 133 (1926–1929). By 1930, the route designation became SR 276. Within one year, the entire route became paved. Since then, no major changes have affected the route.

== Major intersections ==
The entire route is in Clermont County.

Location	mi	km	Destinations	Notes
Williamsburg	0.00	0.00	SR 133 south (West Main Street) / 5th Street	Southern end of SR 133 concurrency
Williamsburg	0.51	0.82	SR 133 north (Tollgate Road) to SR 32 – Blanchester, Batavia	Northern end of SR 133 concurrency
Owensville	6.10	9.82	SR 132 south / Jackson Pike – Batavia	Southern end of SR 132 concurrency
Owensville	6.46	10.40	US 50 / SR 132 north (Main Street) / North Broadway Street	Northern end of SR 132 concurrency
1.000 mi = 1.609 km; 1.000 km = 0.621 mi: Concurrency terminus
