= Ohio State Route 221 =

State highway in Brown County, Ohio, US

State Route 221

Route information
- Maintained by ODOT
- Length: 8.04 mi (12.94 km)
- Existed: 1924–present

Major junctions
- South end: US 52 in Higginsport
- North end: SR 125 in Georgetown

Location
- Country: United States
- State: Ohio
- Counties: Brown

Highway system
- Ohio State Highway System; Interstate; US; State; Scenic
← SR 220	→ SR 222

State Route 221 (SR 221, OH 221) is a north–south state highway in southwestern Ohio, a U.S. state. Situated entirely in the southern portion of Brown County, the southern terminus of State Route 221 is at U.S. Route 52 in the eastern end of Higginsport, a village set along the banks of the Ohio River. The northern terminus of State Route 221 is at State Route 125 in the western portion of Georgetown, the county seat of Brown County.

== Route description ==
The entirety of State Route 221 is situated in the southwestern quadrant of Brown County. State Route 221 is included as a part of the National Highway System.

== History ==
State Route 221 first appeared in 1924. At the time, it followed the routing of what is now the county-maintained Old U.S. 68 running between Ripley and Georgetown. Meanwhile, what is currently State Route 221 between Higginsport and Georgetown was at the time designated as a portion of State Route 53. In 1933, when U.S. Route 68 was extended into Ohio, the U.S. route replaced all of State Route 221 from Ripley to Georgetown. With all of State Route 53 from Georgetown north to Kenton replaced by U.S. Route 68, the State Route 221 designation, rather than be removed, was simply transposed onto the former routing of State Route 53 between Higginsport and Georgetown. Consequently, State Route 221 has utilized this alignment since 1933 without any significant changes.

== Major intersections ==
The entire route is in Brown County.

Location	mi	km	Destinations	Notes
Higginsport	0.00	0.00	US 52 – Ripley, Chilo	
Georgetown	8.04	12.94	SR 125 – Hamersville, Russellville	
1.000 mi = 1.609 km; 1.000 km = 0.621 mi
