= Feesburg, Ohio =

Unincorporated community in Ohio, U.S.

Coordinates: 38°52′42″N 83°59′56″W

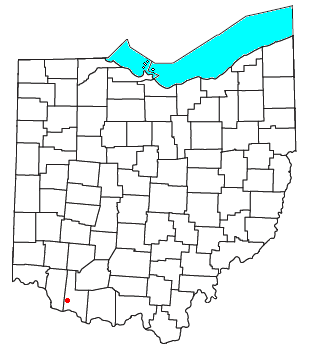
Location of Feesburg, Ohio

Feesburg is a small unincorporated community in northern Lewis Township, Brown County, Ohio, United States. It is located on State Route 505. The ZIP code for Feesburg, Ohio is 45119.

== History ==
Feesburg was laid out in 1835 by Thomas J. Fee, and named for him. A post office has been in operation at Feesburg since 1841.

== Gallery ==
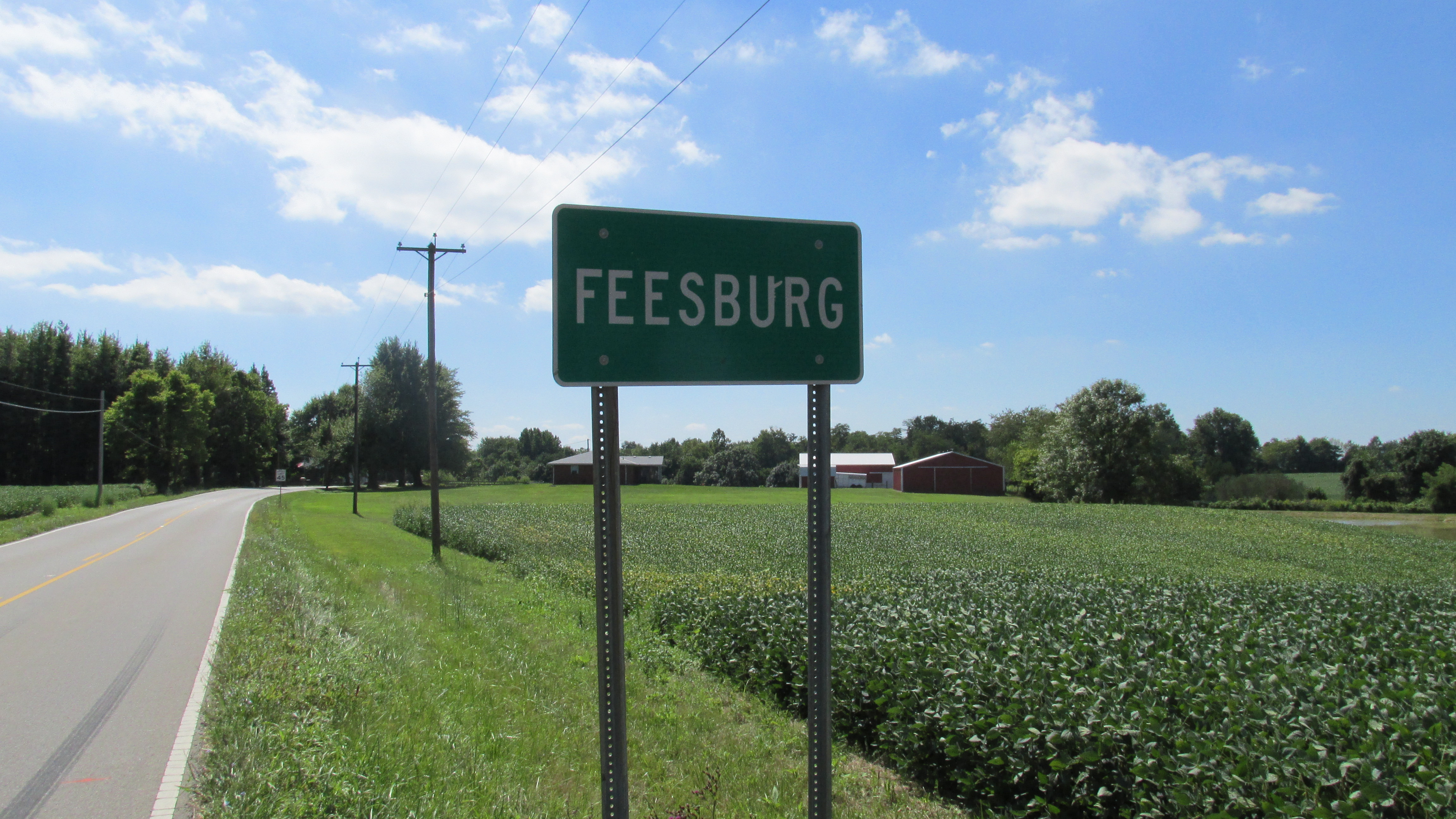
Feesburg community sign.

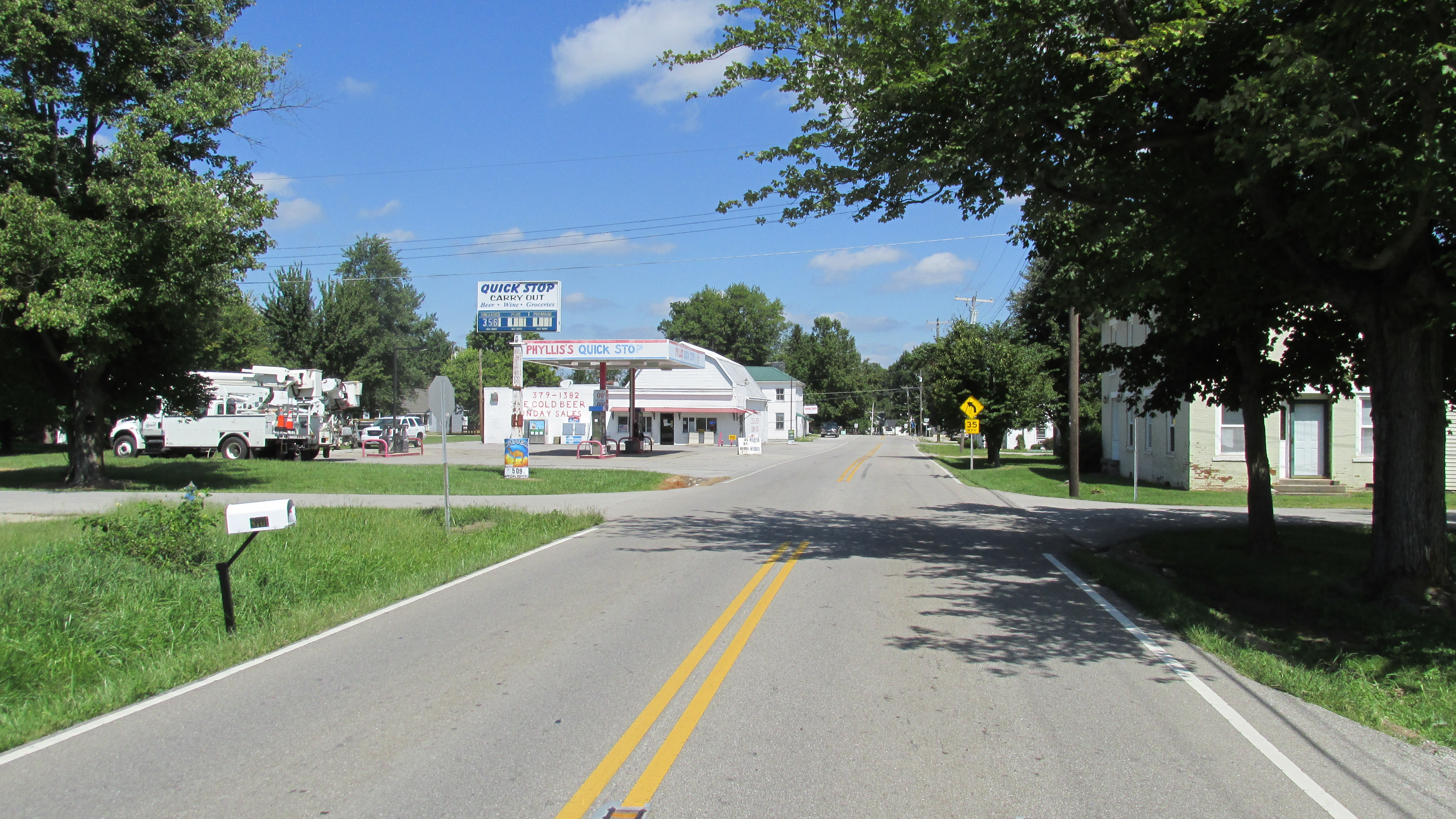
Looking north on Ohio Highway 505 in Feesburg.
