= Blue Jay, Ohio =

- Census-designated place
- Location in Hamilton County and the state of Ohio.
- Coordinates: 39°13′53″N 84°44′53″W
- Country: United States
- State: Ohio
- County: Hamilton

Area
  - Total: 4.41 sq mi (11.42 km^{2})
  - Land: 4.37 sq mi (11.33 km^{2})
  - Water: 0.035 sq mi (0.09 km^{2})
- Elevation: 755 ft (230 m)

Population (2020)
  - Total: 1,427
  - Density: 326.2/sq mi (125.95/km^{2})
- Time zone: UTC-5 (Eastern (EST))
  - Summer (DST): UTC-4 (EDT)
- FIPS code: 39-07377
- GNIS feature ID: 2585500

Blue Jay is a census-designated place (CDP) in Whitewater Township, Hamilton County, Ohio, United States. The population was 1,427 at the 2020 census.

== Geography ==
Blue Jay is located along Harrison Pike, 18 miles (29 km) northwest of Cincinnati. An interchange between Interstate 74 and Interstate 275 is south of the center of the CDP. Harrison, Ohio is located just west of Blue Jay.

According to the United States Census Bureau, the CDP has a total area of 4.4 square miles (11.4 km^{2}), of which 4.4 square miles (11.3 km^{2}) is land and 0.04 square miles (0.1 km^{2}), or 0.79%, is water.

== Demographics ==
Historical population
Census	Pop.	Note	%±
2020	1,427		—
U.S. Decennial Census

As of the 2020 census, the CDP had a population of 1,427, with a density of 326.25 people per square mile (125.95/km²). There were 561 housing units. The racial makeup of the CDP was 92.7% White, 1.8% Black or African American, 0.0% Native American, 0.7% Asian, 0.1% Pacific Islander, 1.0% from some other race, and 3.8% from two or more races. 2.2% of the population were Hispanic or Latino of any race.

There were 560 households, out of which 42.9% had children under the age of 18 living with them, 76.4% were married couples living together, 7.7% had a male householder with no spouse present, and 10.2% had a female householder with no spouse present. 14.1% of all households were made up of individuals, and 7.7% were someone living alone who was 65 years of age or older. The average household size was 2.95, and the average family size was 3.27.

31.0% of the CDP's population were under the age of 18, 55.2% were 18 to 64, and 13.8% were 65 years of age or older. The median age was 38.1. For every 100 females, there were 102.2 males.

According to the U.S. Census American Community Survey, for the period 2016-2020 the estimated median annual income for a household in the CDP was $103,350, and the median income for a family was $104,029. About 4.6% of the population were living below the poverty line, including 0.0% of those under age 18 and 4.0% of those age 65 or over. About 66.5% of the population were employed, and 26.4% had a bachelor's degree or higher.
