= Point Isabel, Ohio =

Unincorporated community in Ohio, U.S.

Coordinates: 38°53′42″N 84°8′31″W

Point Isabel is an unincorporated community in Washington Township, Clermont County, in the U.S. state of Ohio.

== History ==
The first settlement at Point Isabel was made around 1838. A post office called Point Isabel was established in 1847, and remained in operation until 1907.

Athlete George Flippin, a pioneering African-American football player, was born in Point Isabel in 1868.
