= Friendship, Ohio =

- CDP
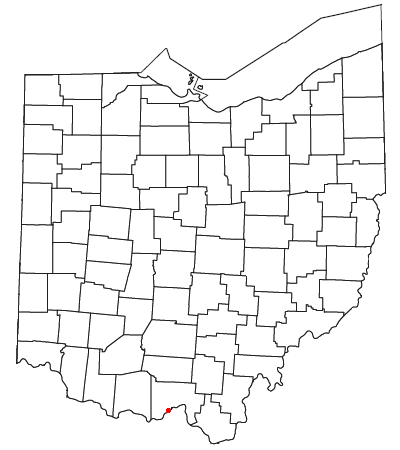
- Location of Friendship, Ohio
- Coordinates: 38°41′53″N 83°06′02″W
- Country: United States
- State: Ohio
- County: Scioto
- Township: Nile
- Elevation: 528 ft (161 m)

Population (2020)
  - Total: 343
- Time zone: UTC-5 (Eastern (EST))
  - Summer (DST): UTC-4 (EDT)
- ZIP code: 45630
- Area codes: 740, 220
- GNIS feature ID: 2628894

Friendship is a census-designated place in western Nile Township, Scioto County, Ohio, United States. As of the 2020 census it had a population of 343. It has a post office with the ZIP code 45630. It lies along U.S. Route 52.

The citizens of Friendship are served by the Nile Township Volunteer Fire Department and the Washington-Nile Local School District (Portsmouth West High School).

== Notable person ==
- Al Bridwell, former Major League Baseball player
