= Monroe Township, Clermont County, Ohio =

Township in Ohio, US

- Township
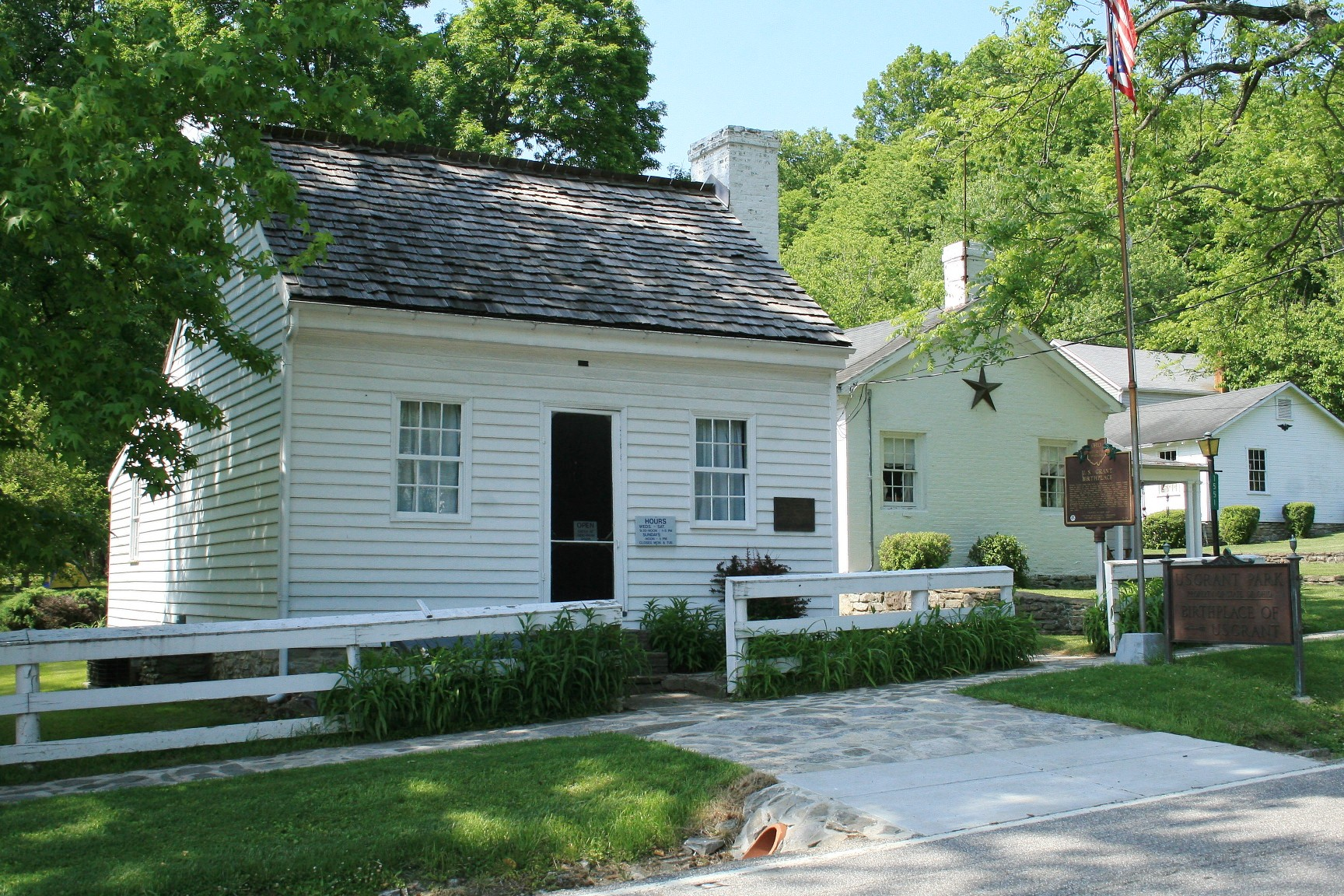
- Grant Birthplace at Point Pleasant

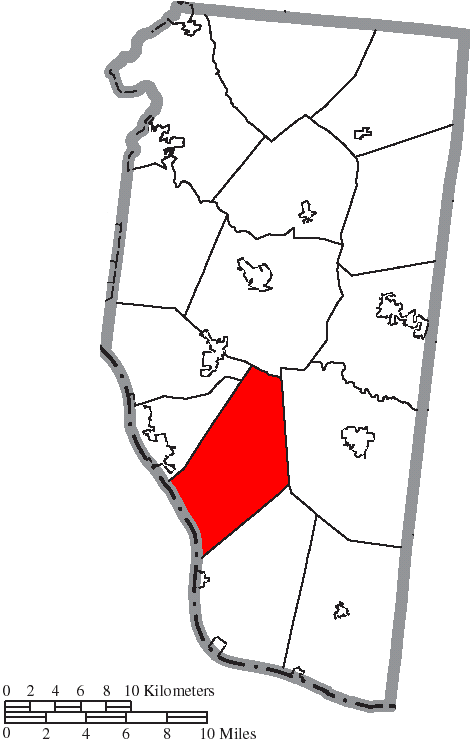
- Location of Monroe Township in Clermont County
- Coordinates: 38°56′50″N 84°11′25″W
- Country: United States
- State: Ohio
- County: Clermont

Area
  - Total: 31.7 sq mi (82.1 km^{2})
  - Land: 31.4 sq mi (81.4 km^{2})
  - Water: 0.27 sq mi (0.7 km^{2})
- Elevation: 879 ft (268 m)

Population (2020)
  - Total: 7,531
  - Density: 249/sq mi (96.2/km^{2})
- Time zone: UTC-5 (Eastern (EST))
  - Summer (DST): UTC-4 (EDT)
- FIPS code: 39-51338
- GNIS feature ID: 1085867
- Website: Township website

Monroe Township, founded June 9, 1825, is one of the fourteen townships of Clermont County, Ohio, United States. The population was 7,531 at the 2020 census. The birthplace of Ulysses S. Grant is located in Point Pleasant, an unincorporated community in the southern part of the township.

== Geography ==
Located in the southwestern part of the county along the Ohio River, it borders the following townships:

- Batavia Township - north
- Tate Township - east
- Washington Township - south
- Ohio Township - west
- Pierce Township - northwest

Campbell County, Kentucky lies across the Ohio River to the southwest.

No municipalities are located in Monroe Township, although the unincorporated community of Point Pleasant lies in the township's south along the Ohio River. Other unincorporated areas include Nicholsville, Ohio and Laurel, Ohio.

== Name and history ==
It is one of 22 Monroe Townships statewide.

== Government ==
The township is governed by a three-member board of trustees, who are elected in November of odd-numbered years to a four-year term beginning on the following January 1. Two are elected in the year after the presidential election and one is elected in the year before it. There is also an elected township fiscal officer, who serves a four-year term beginning on April 1 of the year after the election, which is held in November of the year before the presidential election. Vacancies in the fiscal officership or on the board of trustees are filled by the remaining trustees. Monroe Township also employs a township administrator for daily activities.

== Parks ==
The township maintains two parks: Fair Oak Park in Amelia and Monroe Community Park in Bethel. There is also a rest stop across from the Grant Birthplace and the Bachelier Park sports complex operated by Amelia Knothole Baseball.

== School districts ==
Monroe Township is covered by two school districts, New Richmond Exempted Village School District and West Clermont Local School District.

== Notable people ==
- Ulysses S. Grant (April 27, 1822 – July 23, 1885) Commanding General of the United States Army during the American Civil War and 18th President of the United States
- Henry Clark Corbin (September 15, 1842 – September 8, 1909) Adjutant General of the U.S. Army from 1898 to 1904
- Eliza Archard Conner (1838 – 1912), journalist, lecturer, and feminist
