= Moscow, Ohio =

- Village
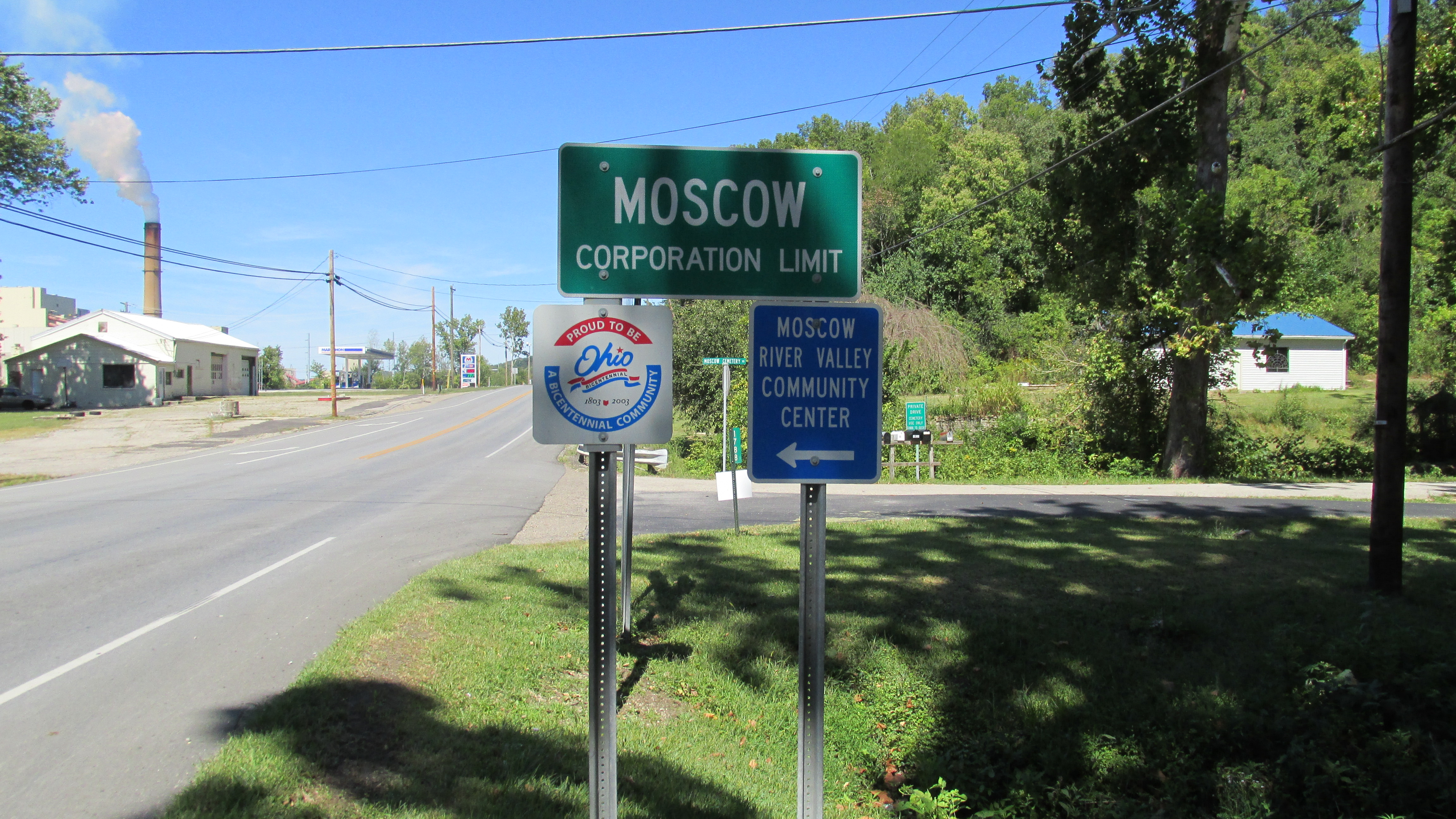
- Moscow corporation limit sign with William H. Zimmer Power Station in the background.
- Motto: "...a peaceful spot on the River"
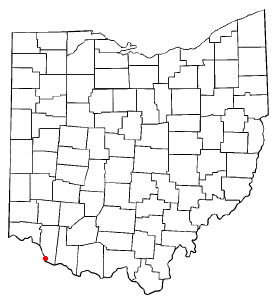
- Location of Moscow, Ohio

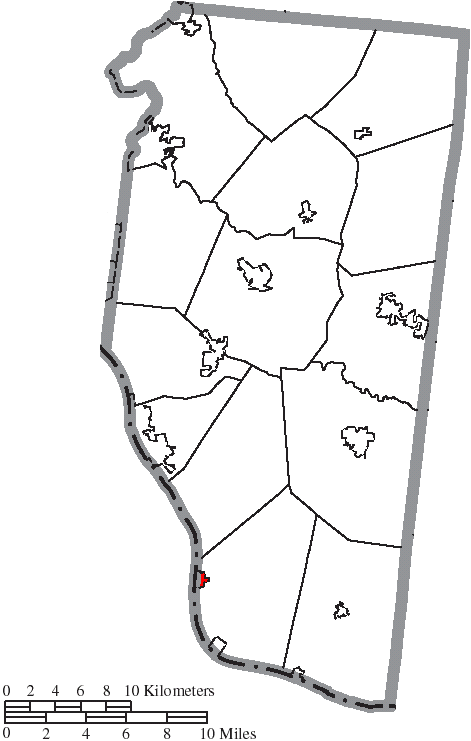
- Location of Moscow in Clermont County
- Coordinates: 38°51′37″N 84°13′41″W
- Country: United States
- State: Ohio
- County: Clermont
- Township: Washington

Government
  - Mayor: Tim Suter

Area
  - Total: 0.39 sq mi (1.01 km^{2})
  - Land: 0.37 sq mi (0.95 km^{2})
  - Water: 0.023 sq mi (0.06 km^{2})
- Elevation: 499 ft (152 m)

Population (2020)
  - Total: 155
  - Density: 422.5/sq mi (163.12/km^{2})
- Time zone: UTC-5 (Eastern (EST))
  - Summer (DST): UTC-4 (EDT)
- ZIP code: 45153
- Area code: 513
- FIPS code: 39-52416
- GNIS feature ID: 2399404
- Website: www.villageofmoscow.org

Moscow (/ˈmɒskoʊ/ MOS-koh) is a village in Clermont County, Ohio. The population was 155 at the time of the 2020 census. The William H. Zimmer Power Station, a coal-fired power plant that was converted from a planned nuclear power plant during construction, is partially located within village limits. It is located near the Ulysses S. Grant Birthplace.

== History ==
Moscow was platted in 1816. The name may have been given to the town by French immigrants who were veterans of Napoleon's Invasion of Russia. A post office called Moscow has been in operation since 1826.

William J. Bulow, a U.S. Senator from South Dakota and Governor of South Dakota, was born in Moscow in 1869 and attended local schools.

On March 2, 2012, a tornado destroyed over 80% of the town and caused three deaths, as multiple tornadoes ripped through Indiana, Kentucky and Ohio.

== Geography ==
Moscow is located along the Ohio River.

According to the United States Census Bureau, the village has a total area of 0.39 square miles (1.01 km^{2}), of which 0.37 square miles (0.96 km^{2}) is land and 0.02 square miles (0.05 km^{2}) is water.

== Demographics ==
Historical population
Census	Pop.	Note	%±
1860	434		—
1870	443		2.1%
1880	516		16.5%
1890	591		14.5%
1900	475		−19.6%
1910	327		−31.2%
1920	274		−16.2%
1930	293		6.9%
1940	309		5.5%
1950	336		8.7%
1960	438		30.4%
1970	348		−20.5%
1980	324		−6.9%
1990	279		−13.9%
2000	244		−12.5%
2010	185		−24.2%
2020	155		−16.2%
U.S. Decennial Census

=== 2010 census ===
As of the census of 2010, there were 185 people, 81 households, and 51 families living in the village. The population density was 500.0 inhabitants per square mile (193.1/km^{2}). There were 96 housing units at an average density of 259.5 per square mile (100.2/km^{2}). The racial makeup of the village was 98.4% White, 1.1% African American, and 0.5% from other races. Hispanic or Latino of any race were 1.6% of the population.

There were 81 households, of which 24.7% had children under the age of 18 living with them, 44.4% were married couples living together, 18.5% had a female householder with no husband present, and 37.0% were non-families. 30.9% of all households were made up of individuals, and 11.1% had someone living alone who was 65 years of age or older. The average household size was 2.28 and the average family size was 2.80.

The median age in the village was 47.7 years. 16.8% of residents were under the age of 18; 6.9% were between the ages of 18 and 24; 21.1% were from 25 to 44; 39.9% were from 45 to 64; and 15.1% were 65 years of age or older. The gender makeup of the village was 51.9% male and 48.1% female.

=== 2000 census ===
As of the census of 2000, there were 244 people, 91 households, and 64 families living in the village. The population density was 606.3 inhabitants per square mile (234.1/km^{2}). There were 104 housing units at an average density of 258.4 per square mile (99.8/km^{2}). The racial makeup of the village was 97.13% White, 0.41% African American, 0.41% Native American, 0.41% Asian, 0.41% from other races, and 1.23% from two or more races.

There were 91 households, out of which 38.5% had children under the age of 18 living with them, 51.6% were married couples living together, 17.6% had a female householder with no husband present, and 28.6% were non-families. 26.4% of all households were made up of individuals, and 9.9% had someone living alone who was 65 years of age or older. The average household size was 2.68 and the average family size was 3.26.

In the village, the population was spread out, with 29.1% under the age of 18, 6.6% from 18 to 24, 30.3% from 25 to 44, 23.0% from 45 to 64, and 11.1% who were 65 years of age or older. The median age was 36 years. For every 100 females, there were 98.4 males. For every 100 females age 18 and over, there were 88.0 males.

The median income for a household in the village was $31,563, and the median income for a family was $33,125. Males had a median income of $30,357 versus $26,250 for females. The per capita income for the village was $12,491. About 14.3% of families and 19.9% of the population were below the poverty line, including 34.6% of those under the age of eighteen and none of those 65 or over.

== See also ==
- List of cities and towns along the Ohio River
