= Washington Township, Clermont County, Ohio =

Township in Ohio, US

- Township
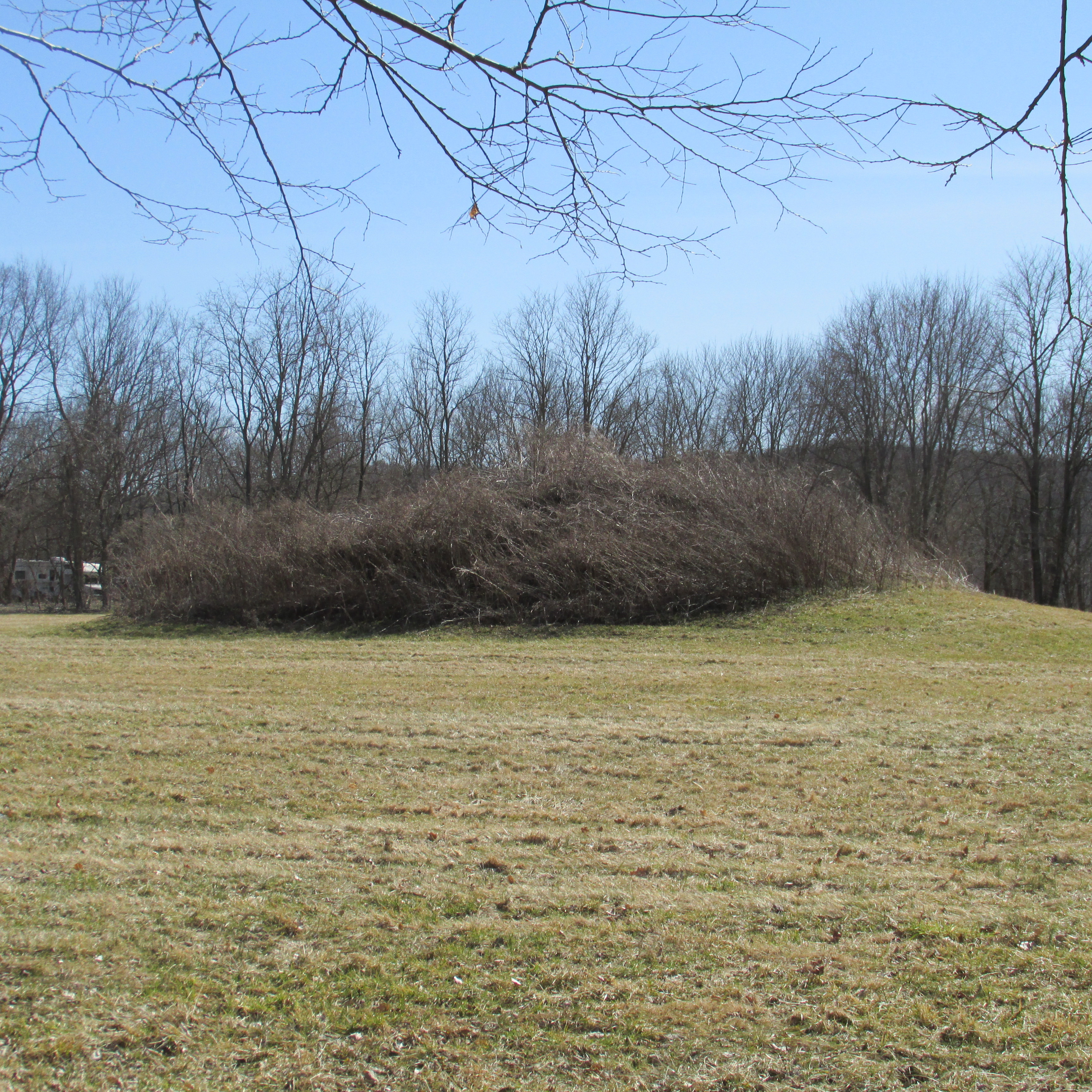
- Prehistoric Edgington Mound on U.S. Route 52

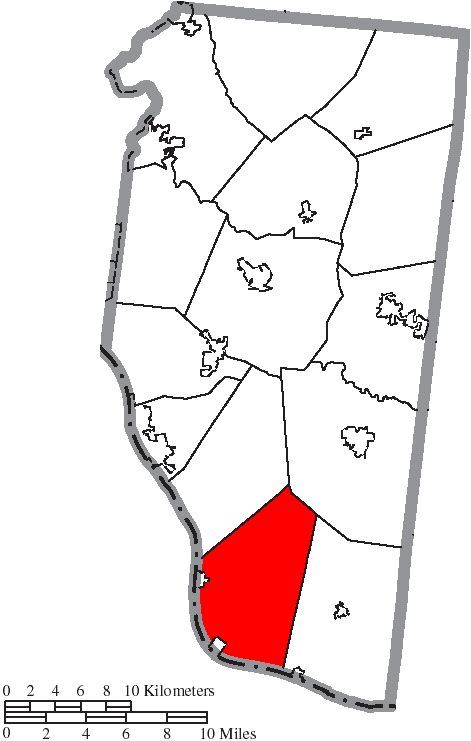
- Location of Washington Township in Clermont County
- Coordinates: 38°51′13″N 84°11′50″W
- Country: United States
- State: Ohio
- County: Clermont

Government
  - Type: Board of Trustees
  - Trustee: David Peters

Area
  - Total: 36.3 sq mi (94.0 km^{2})
  - Land: 35.6 sq mi (92.3 km^{2})
  - Water: 0.66 sq mi (1.7 km^{2})
- Elevation: 751 ft (229 m)

Population (2020)
  - Total: 2,182
  - Density: 64/sq mi (24.7/km^{2})
- Time zone: UTC-5 (Eastern (EST))
  - Summer (DST): UTC-4 (EDT)
- Postal code: 45153
- Area code: 45153
- FIPS code: 39-81130
- GNIS feature ID: 1085873
- Website: washingtontwpclermont.org

Washington Township is one of the fourteen townships of Clermont County, Ohio, United States. The population was 2,182 at the 2020 census.

== Geography ==
Located in the southern part of the county along the Ohio River, it borders the following townships:

- Monroe Township - north
- Tate Township - northeast
- Franklin Township - east

Across the Ohio River, Washington Township borders Kentucky to the south and west:

- Bracken County - south
- Pendleton County - west
- Campbell County - northwest

Two villages are located in Washington Township along the Ohio River: Moscow in the west, and Neville in the southwest.

== Name and history ==
Washington Township was organized in 1801.

It is one of 43 Washington Townships statewide.

== Government ==
The township is governed by a three-member board of trustees, who are elected in November of odd-numbered years to a four-year term beginning on the following January 1. Two are elected in the year after the presidential election and one is elected in the year before it. There is also an elected township fiscal officer, who serves a four-year term beginning on April 1 of the year after the election, which is held in November of the year before the presidential election. Vacancies in the fiscal officership or on the board of trustees are filled by the remaining trustees.
