= Point Pleasant, Ohio =

Unincorporated community in Ohio, U.S.

Coordinates: 38°53′40″N 84°14′02″W

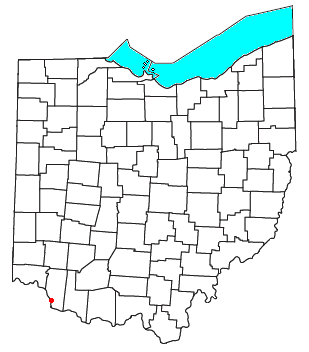
Location of Point Pleasant, Ohio

Point Pleasant is a small unincorporated community in southern Monroe Township, Clermont County, Ohio, United States. It is located on the Ohio River, around 25 miles (40 km) southeast of Cincinnati. U.S. Route 52 passes through Point Pleasant, where it intersects State Route 232. It is best known for being the birthplace of the 18th president of the United States, Ulysses S. Grant.

== History ==
Point Pleasant was platted in 1813. A post office called Point Pleasant that was established in 1826 remained in operation until 1983. By 1833, Point Pleasant had about 130 inhabitants. The Ohio River flood of 1937 inundated the community.

Point Pleasant is the birthplace of Civil War general and U.S. President Ulysses S. Grant. The one-story cottage where he was born was taken by barge on a tour across the country, then by rail to Columbus, Ohio, where it was displayed at the Ohio State Fairgrounds. It was returned to Point Pleasant in 1936, where it has been restored with period furniture and opened to tours.

== Gallery ==
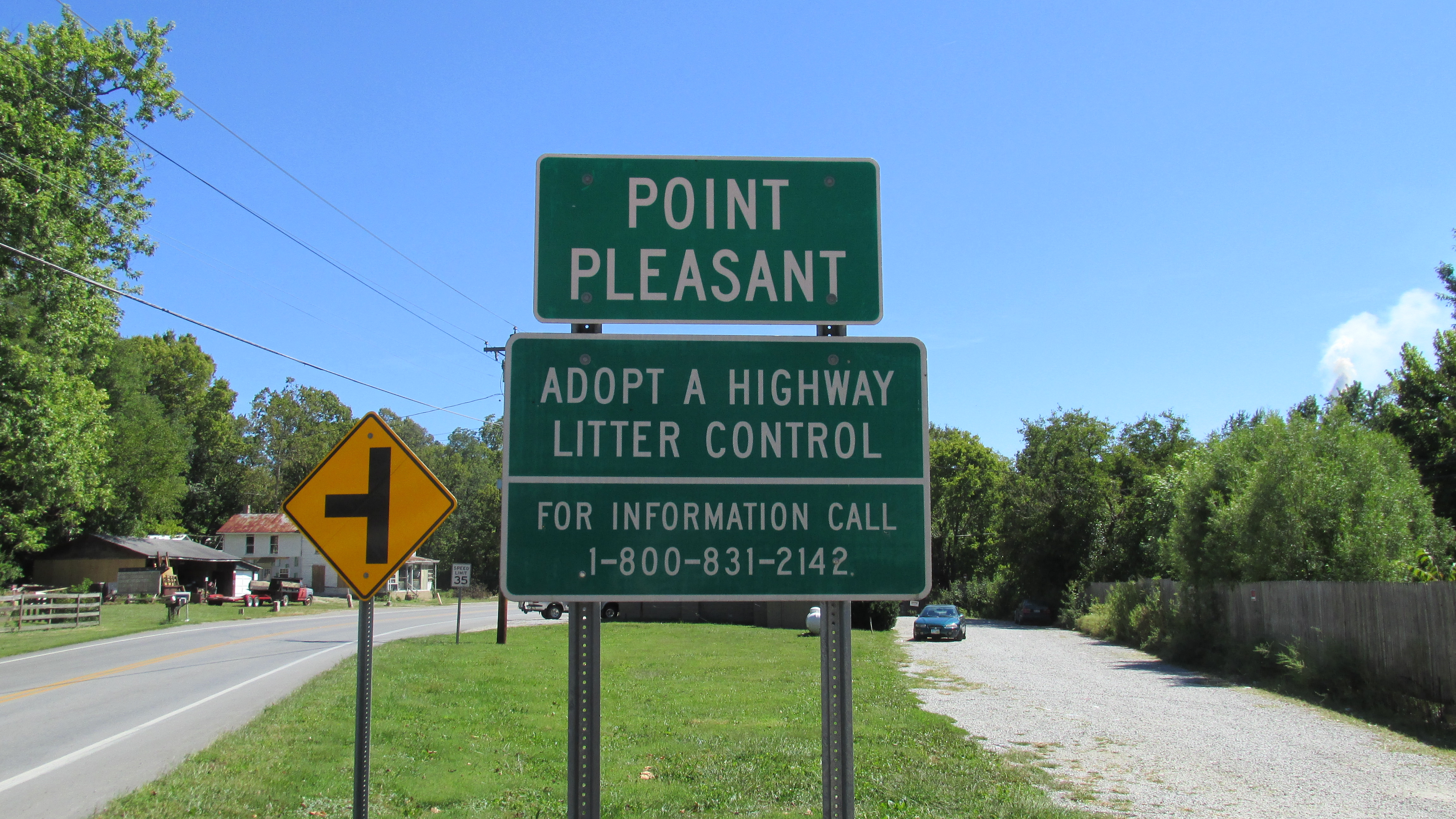
Point Pleasant community sign

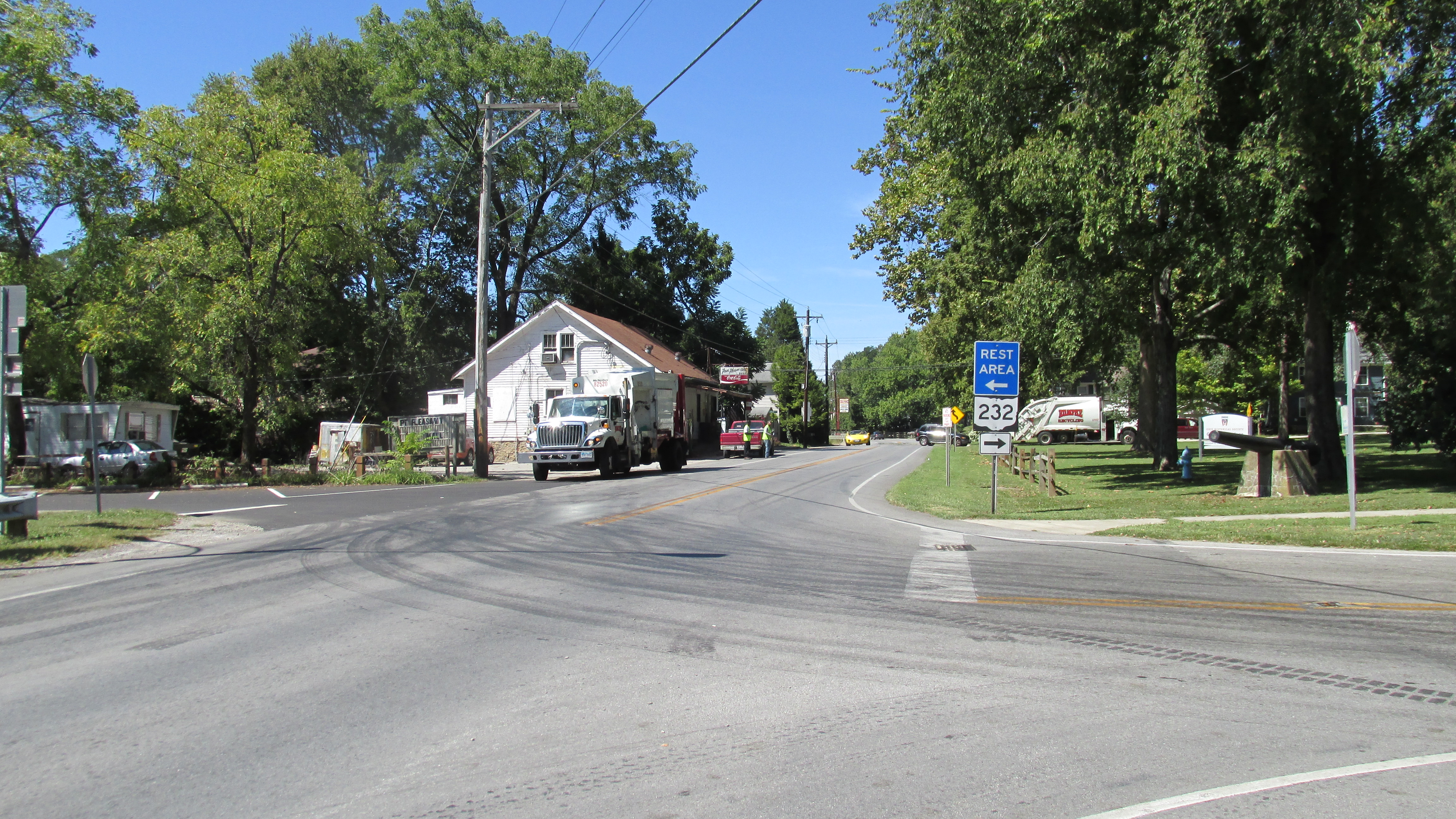
Junction of US Highway 52 and Ohio Highway 232 in Point Pleasant

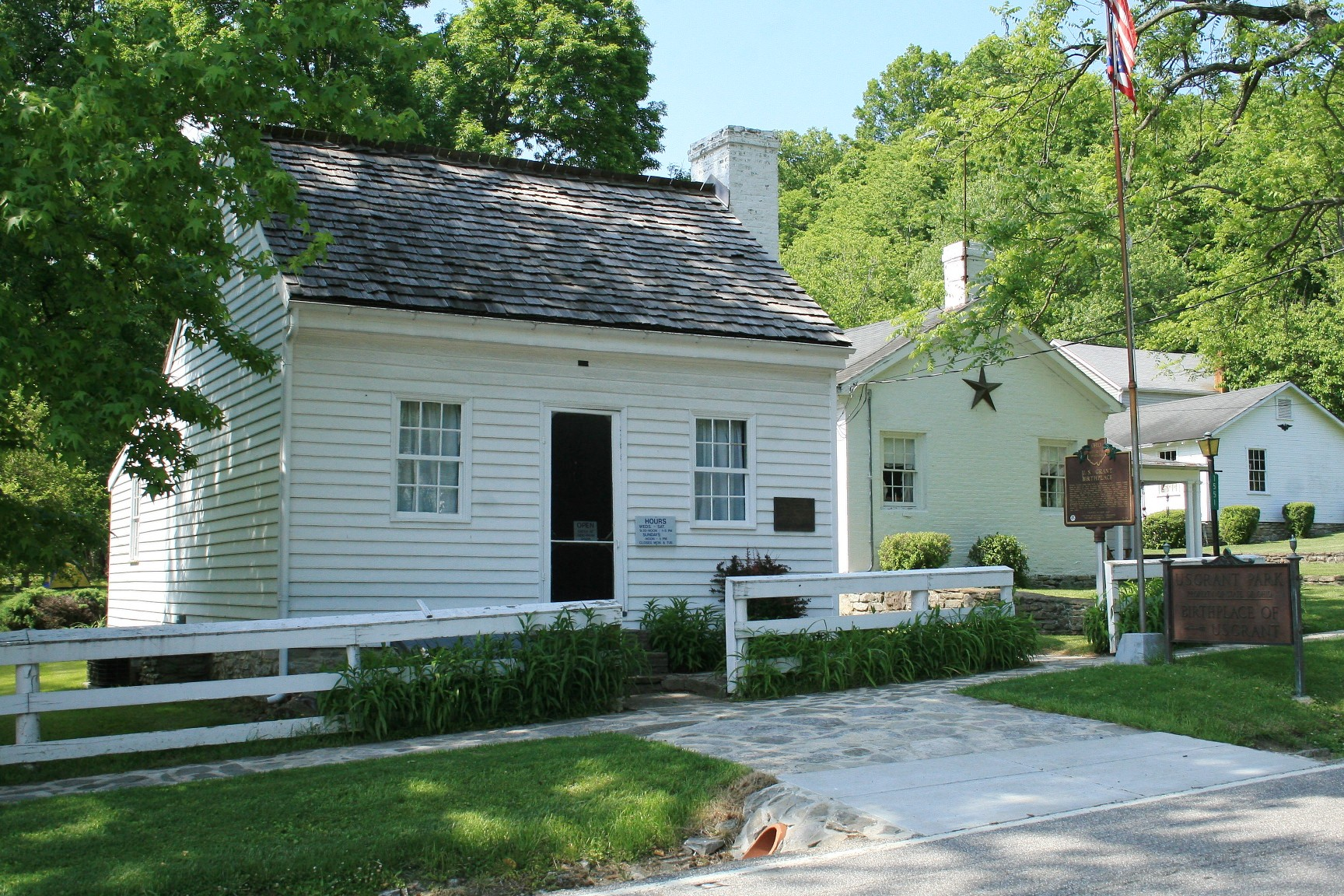
Birthplace of Ulysses Grant

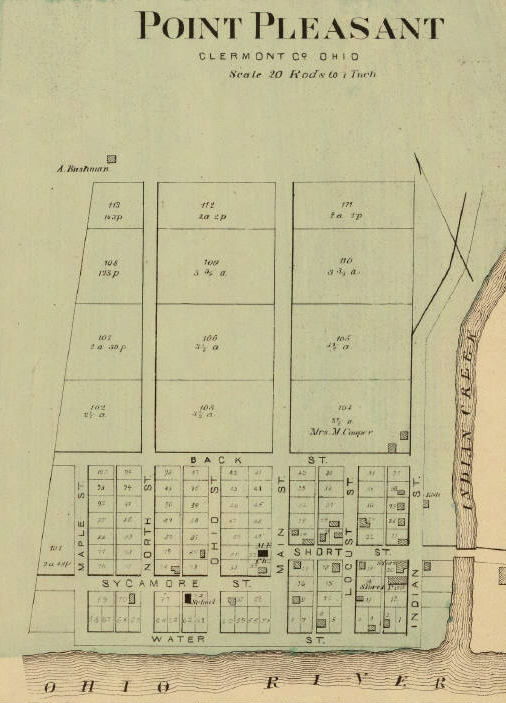
Detail of 1877 map showing Point Pleasant, Ohio

== See also ==
- List of cities and towns along the Ohio River
