= Felicity, Ohio =

- Village
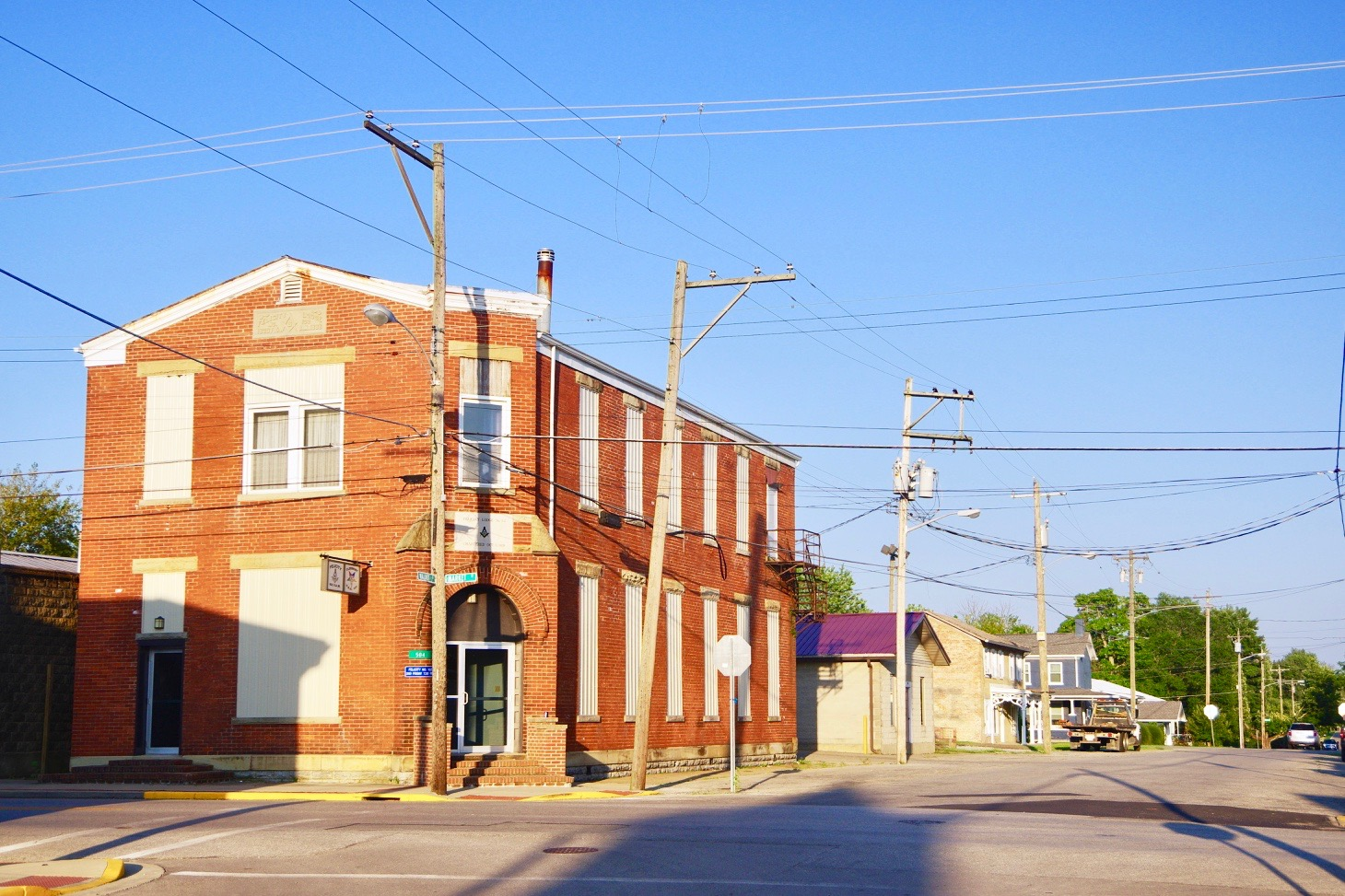
- Walnut Lane, with Felicity Lodge on the left

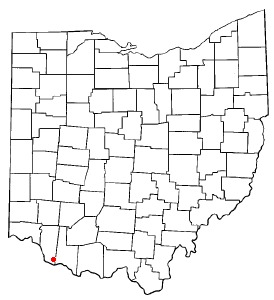
- Location of Felicity, Ohio

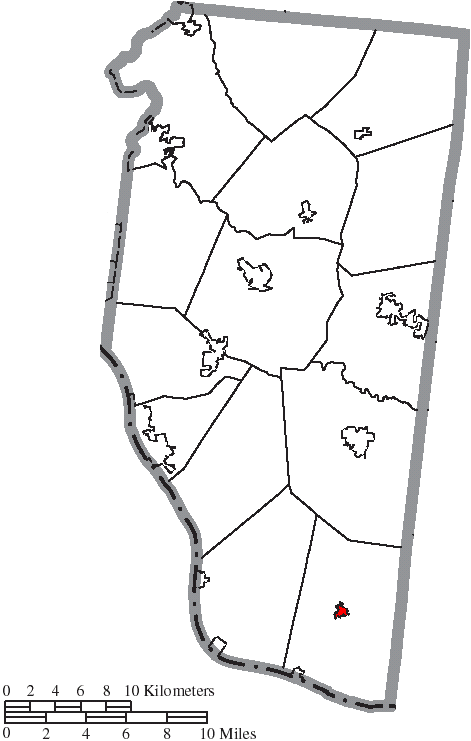
- Location of Felicity in Clermont County
- Coordinates: 38°50′20″N 84°05′54″W
- Country: United States
- State: Ohio
- County: Clermont
- Township: Franklin

Government
  - Mayor: Randy Meyers

Area
  - Total: 0.26 sq mi (0.68 km^{2})
  - Land: 0.26 sq mi (0.68 km^{2})
  - Water: 0 sq mi (0.00 km^{2})
- Elevation: 922 ft (281 m)

Population (2020)
  - Total: 651
  - Estimate (2023): 656
  - Density: 2,467.9/sq mi (952.86/km^{2})
- Time zone: UTC-5 (Eastern (EST))
  - Summer (DST): UTC-4 (EDT)
- ZIP code: 45120
- Area code: 513
- FIPS code: 39-26880
- GNIS feature ID: 2398870
- Website: https://www.felicityohio.us/

Felicity is a village in Franklin Township, Clermont County, Ohio, United States. The population was 651 at the 2020 census.

== History ==
Felicity was laid out in 1817. It was originally called Feestown in honor of founder William Fee, and changed to Felicity per request of Fee's daughter. It is said that Felicity was a corruption of "Feel City", an earlier variant name. A post office called Feestown was established in 1811, and the name was changed to Felicity in 1829.

== Geography ==
The village is concentrated around the intersection of State Route 133 and State Route 222, a few miles north of the Ohio River.

According to the United States Census Bureau, the village has a total area of 0.27 square miles (0.70 km^{2}), all land.

== Demographics ==
Historical population
Census	Pop.	Note	%±
1860	956		—
1870	955		−0.1%
1880	1,047		9.6%
1890	779		−25.6%
1900	695		−10.8%
1910	578		−16.8%
1920	606		4.8%
1930	580		−4.3%
1940	641		10.5%
1950	716		11.7%
1960	878		22.6%
1970	786		−10.5%
1980	929		18.2%
1990	856		−7.9%
2000	922		7.7%
2010	818		−11.3%
2020	651		−20.4%
2023 (est.)	656	▲	0.8%
U.S. Decennial Census

=== 2010 census ===
As of the census of 2010, there were 818 people, 335 households, and 198 families living in the village. The population density was 3,029.6 inhabitants per square mile (1,169.7/km^{2}). There were 374 housing units at an average density of 1,385.2 per square mile (534.8/km^{2}). The racial makeup of the village was 98.7% White, 0.2% African American, 0.5% Native American, 0.1% Asian, 0.1% from other races, and 0.4% from two or more races. Hispanic or Latino of any race were 1.2% of the population.

There were 335 households, of which 31.9% had children under the age of 18 living with them, 34.9% were married couples living together, 17.3% had a female householder with no husband present, 6.9% had a male householder with no wife present, and 40.9% were non-families. 34.3% of all households were made up of individuals, and 16.4% had someone living alone who was 65 years of age or older. The average household size was 2.44 and the average family size was 3.19.

The median age in the village was 37.5 years. 27.8% of residents were under the age of 18; 6.3% were between the ages of 18 and 24; 26.6% were from 25 to 44; 27.1% were from 45 to 64; and 12.2% were 65 years of age or older. The gender makeup of the village was 46.6% male and 53.4% female.

=== 2000 census ===
As of the census of 2000, there were 922 people, 344 households, and 232 families living in the village. The population density was 3,450.8 inhabitants per square mile (1,332.4/km^{2}). There were 370 housing units at an average density of 1,384.8 per square mile (534.7/km^{2}). The racial makeup of the village was 97.72% White, 0.87% African American, 0.11% Native American, 0.11% Asian, and 1.19% from two or more races. Hispanic or Latino of any race were 1.08% of the population.

There were 344 households, out of which 35.8% had children under the age of 18 living with them, 45.6% were married couples living together, 16.9% had a female householder with no husband present, and 32.3% were non-families. 27.6% of all households were made up of individuals, and 14.0% had someone living alone who was 65 years of age or older. The average household size was 2.68 and the average family size was 3.27.

In the village, the population was spread out, with 31.6% under the age of 18, 9.2% from 18 to 24, 26.9% from 25 to 44, 20.1% from 45 to 64, and 12.3% who were 65 years of age or older. The median age was 31 years. For every 100 females there were 91.7 males. For every 100 females age 18 and over, there were 87.8 males.

The median income for a household in the village was $20,781, and the median income for a family was $25,625. Males had a median income of $31,136 versus $18,750 for females. The per capita income for the village was $10,490. About 29.2% of families and 34.9% of the population were below the poverty line, including 43.5% of those under age 18 and 33.6% of those age 65 or over.

== Education ==
Felicity has a public library, a branch of the Clermont County Public Library.

== Notable people ==
- Guy T. Helvering, representative, commissioner, and judge

== Gallery ==
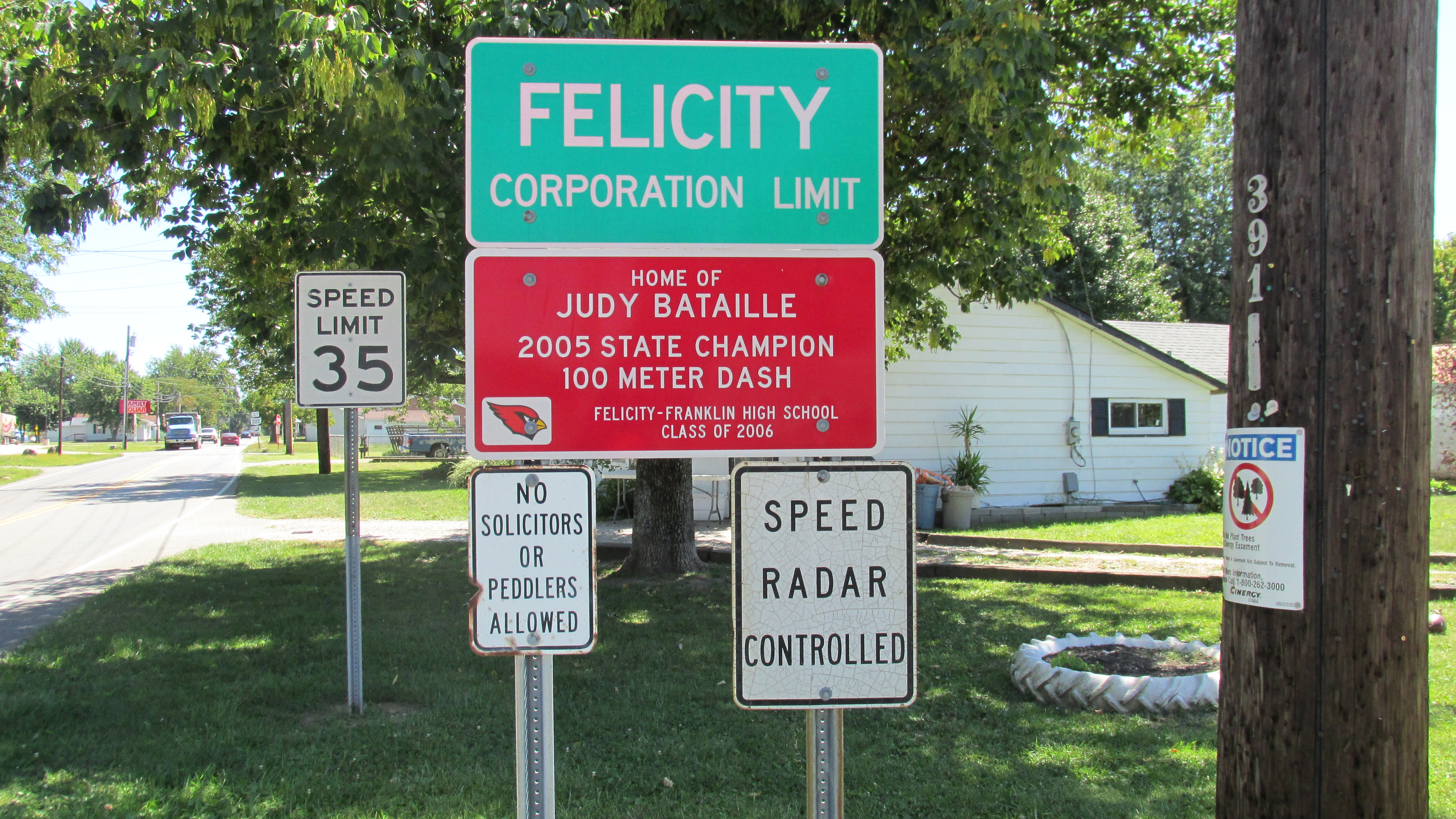
Felicity corporation limit sign.

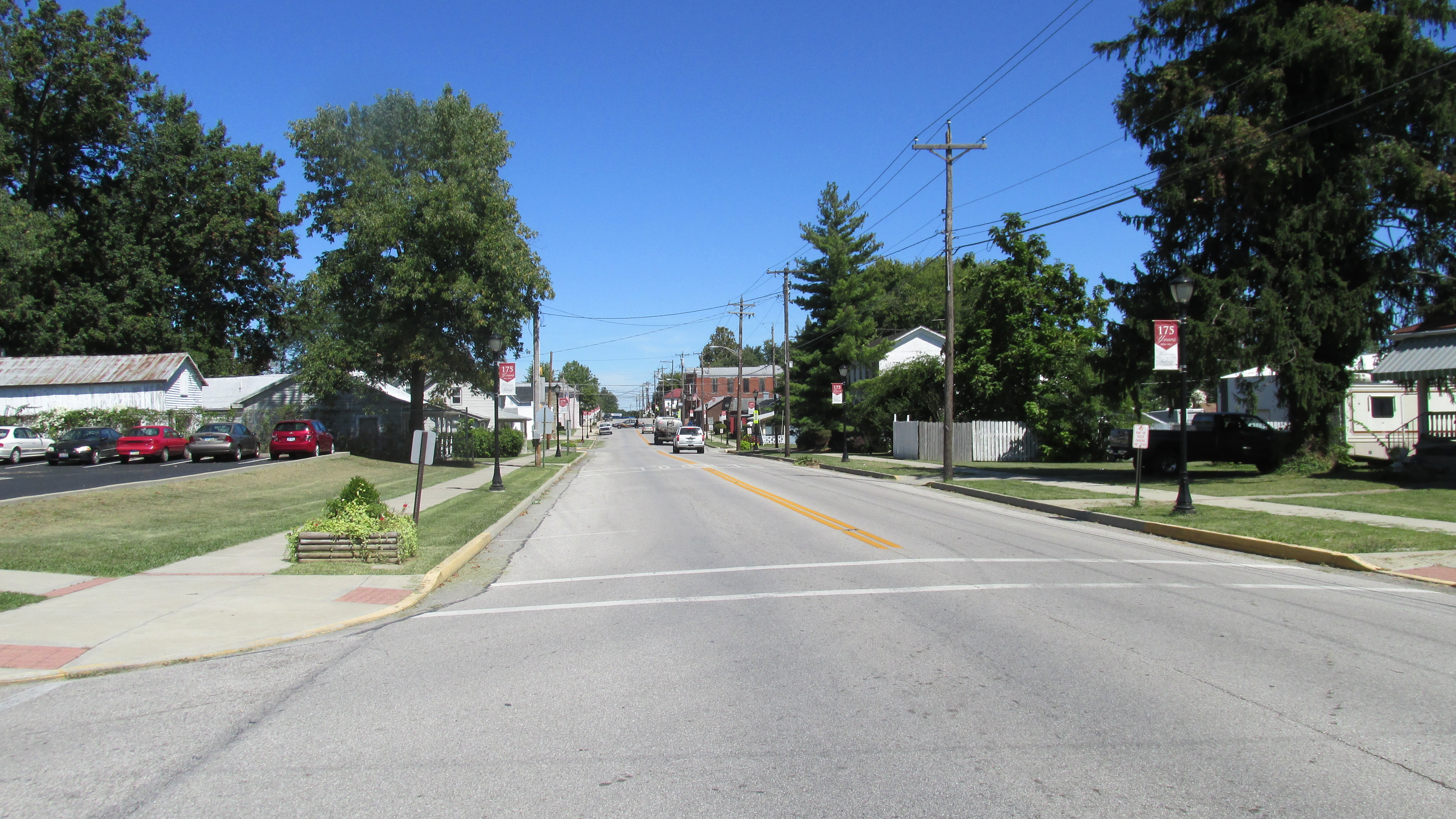
Looking north at the intersection of Market and Vine Streets in Felicity.
