= Bethel, Ohio =

- Village
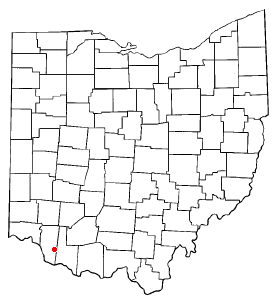
- Location of Bethel, Ohio

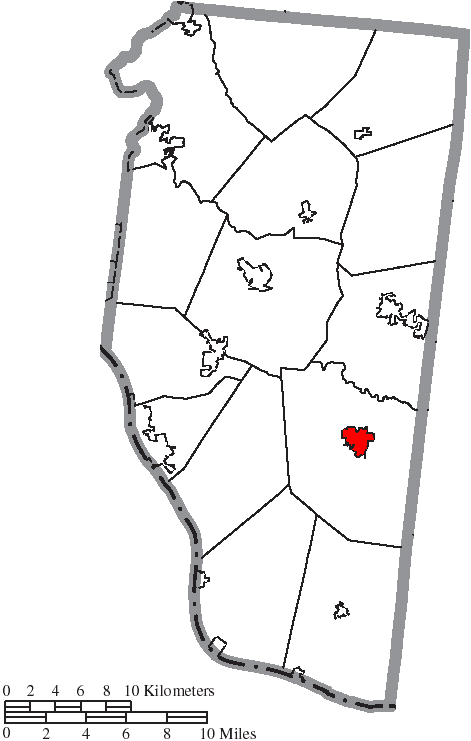
- Location of Bethel in Clermont County
- Coordinates: 38°57′46″N 84°05′05″W
- Country: United States
- State: Ohio
- County: Clermont
- Township: Tate

Government
  - Mayor: Jay Noble

Area
  - Total: 1.43 sq mi (3.71 km^{2})
  - Land: 1.43 sq mi (3.70 km^{2})
  - Water: 0.0039 sq mi (0.01 km^{2})
- Elevation: 873 ft (266 m)

Population (2020)
  - Total: 2,620
  - Estimate (2023): 2,659
  - Density: 1,835.6/sq mi (708.73/km^{2})
- Time zone: UTC-5 (Eastern (EST))
  - Summer (DST): UTC-4 (EDT)
- ZIP code: 45106
- Area code: 513
- FIPS code: 39-06068
- GNIS feature ID: 2398110
- Website: bethel-oh.gov

Bethel is a village in Tate Township, Clermont County, Ohio, United States. The population was 2,620 at the 2020 census.

== History ==
Bethel was originally called Plainfield, and under the latter name was platted in 1798. The town site was replatted in 1802 under the name Bethel. The present name is after Bethel, a city in the Hebrew Bible. A post office in Bethel has been in operation since 1815.

== Geography ==
According to the United States Census Bureau, the village has a total area of 1.41 square miles (3.65 km^{2}), of which 1.40 square miles (3.63 km^{2}) is land and 0.01 square miles (0.03 km^{2}) is water.

== Demographics ==
Historical population
Census	Pop.	Note	%±
1870	634		—
1880	582		−8.2%
1890	625		7.4%
1900	850		36.0%
1910	1,201		41.3%
1920	1,340		11.6%
1930	1,312		−2.1%
1940	1,604		22.3%
1950	1,932		20.4%
1960	2,019		4.5%
1970	2,214		9.7%
1980	2,231		0.8%
1990	2,407		7.9%
2000	2,637		9.6%
2010	2,711		2.8%
2020	2,620		−3.4%
2023 (est.)	2,659	▲	1.5%
U.S. Decennial Census

=== 2010 census ===
As of the census of 2010, there were 2,711 people, 1,052 households, and 681 families living in the village. The population density was 1,936.4 inhabitants per square mile (747.6/km^{2}). There were 1,182 housing units at an average density of 844.3 per square mile (326.0/km^{2}). The racial makeup of the village was 97.3% White, 0.4% African American, 0.1% Native American, 0.1% Asian, 0.4% Pacific Islander, 0.1% from other races, and 1.6% from two or more races. Hispanic or Latino of any race were 1.0% of the population.

There were 1,052 households, of which 39.4% had children under the age of 18 living with them, 40.3% were married couples living together, 18.8% had a female householder with no husband present, 5.6% had a male householder with no wife present, and 35.3% were non-families. 30.2% of all households were made up of individuals, and 14.7% had someone living alone who was 65 years of age or older. The average household size was 2.56 and the average family size was 3.16.

The median age in the village was 33.8 years. 29% of residents were under the age of 18; 9.1% were between the ages of 18 and 24; 26.4% were from 25 to 44; 22.4% were from 45 to 64; and 12.9% were 65 years of age or older. The gender makeup of the village was 46.5% male and 53.5% female.

=== 2000 census ===
As of the census of 2000, there were 2,637 people, 1,012 households, and 682 families living in the village. The population density was 1,969.2 inhabitants per square mile (760.3/km^{2}). There were 1,099 housing units at an average density of 820.7 per square mile (316.9/km^{2}). The racial makeup of the village was 98.29% White, 0.11% African American, 0.19% Native American, 0.19% Asian, and 1.21% from two or more races. Hispanic or Latino of any race were 0.72% of the population.

There were 1,012 households, out of which 40.3% had children under the age of 18 living with them, 46.5% were married couples living together, 15.1% had a female householder with no husband present, and 32.6% were non-families. 29.2% of all households were made up of individuals, and 14.8% had someone living alone who was 65 years of age or older. The average household size was 2.59 and the average family size was 3.22.

In the village, the population was spread out, with 31.9% under the age of 18, 8.5% from 18 to 24, 30.9% from 25 to 44, 15.8% from 45 to 64, and 13.0% who were 65 years of age or older. The median age was 31 years. For every 100 females there were 87.2 males. For every 100 females age 18 and over, there were 81.9 males.

The median income for a household in the village was $31,385, and the median income for a family was $38,448. Males had a median income of $31,829 versus $23,844 for females. The per capita income for the village was $15,071. About 16.4% of families and 20.1% of the population were below the poverty line, including 26.9% of those under age 18 and 20.1% of those age 65 or over.

== Education ==
Bethel has a public library, a branch of the Clermont County Public Library.

== Notable people ==
- Libbie C. Riley Baer (1849–1929), poet
- Ulysses S. Grant Jr. - attorney and entrepreneur, a son of President Grant
- Thomas Morris - U.S. Senator from Ohio
- Steven M. Newman - pedestrian circumnavigator, journalist, and author
- Dick Scott - Cincinnati Reds pitcher

== Gallery ==
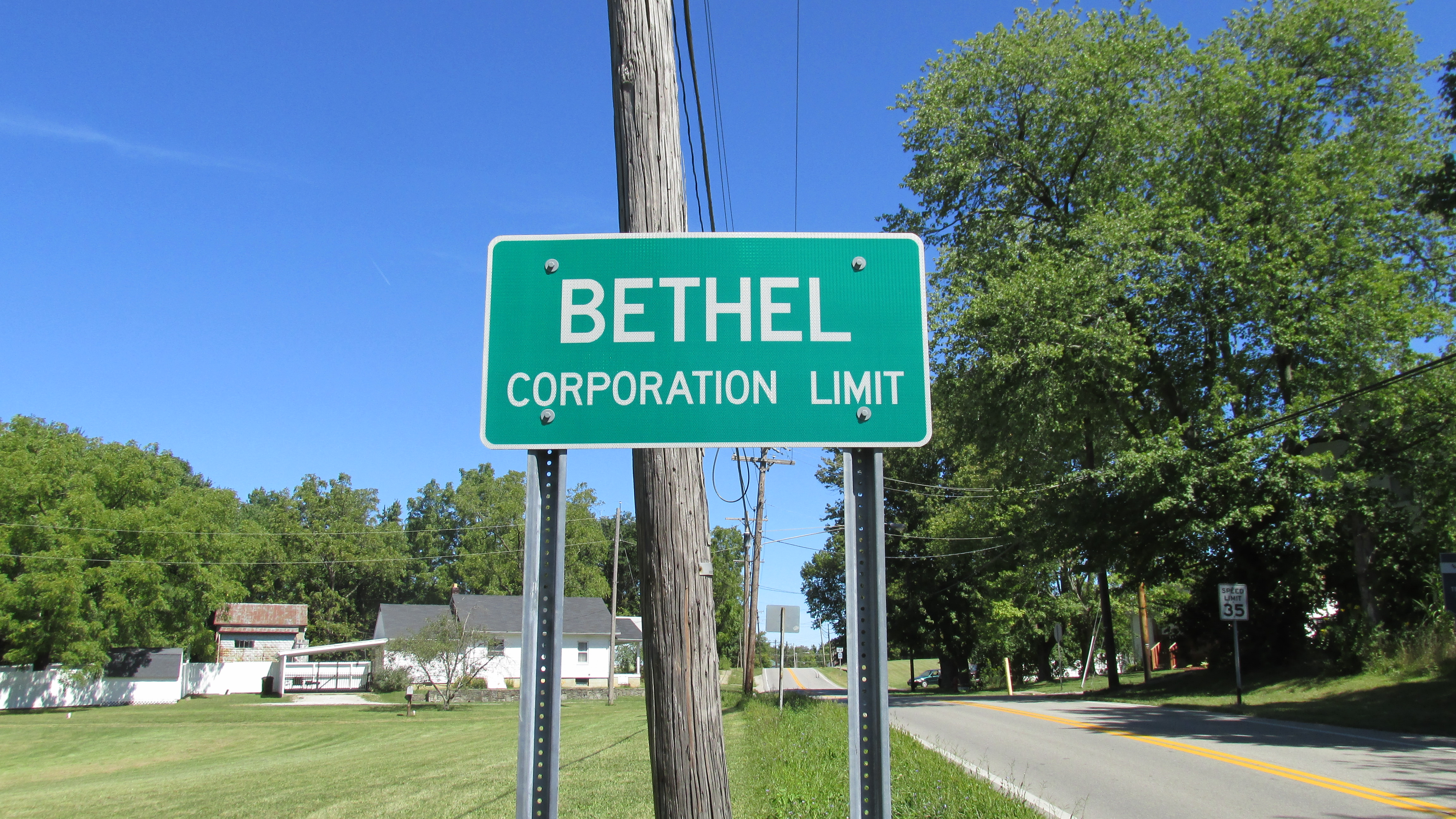
Bethel corporation limit sign

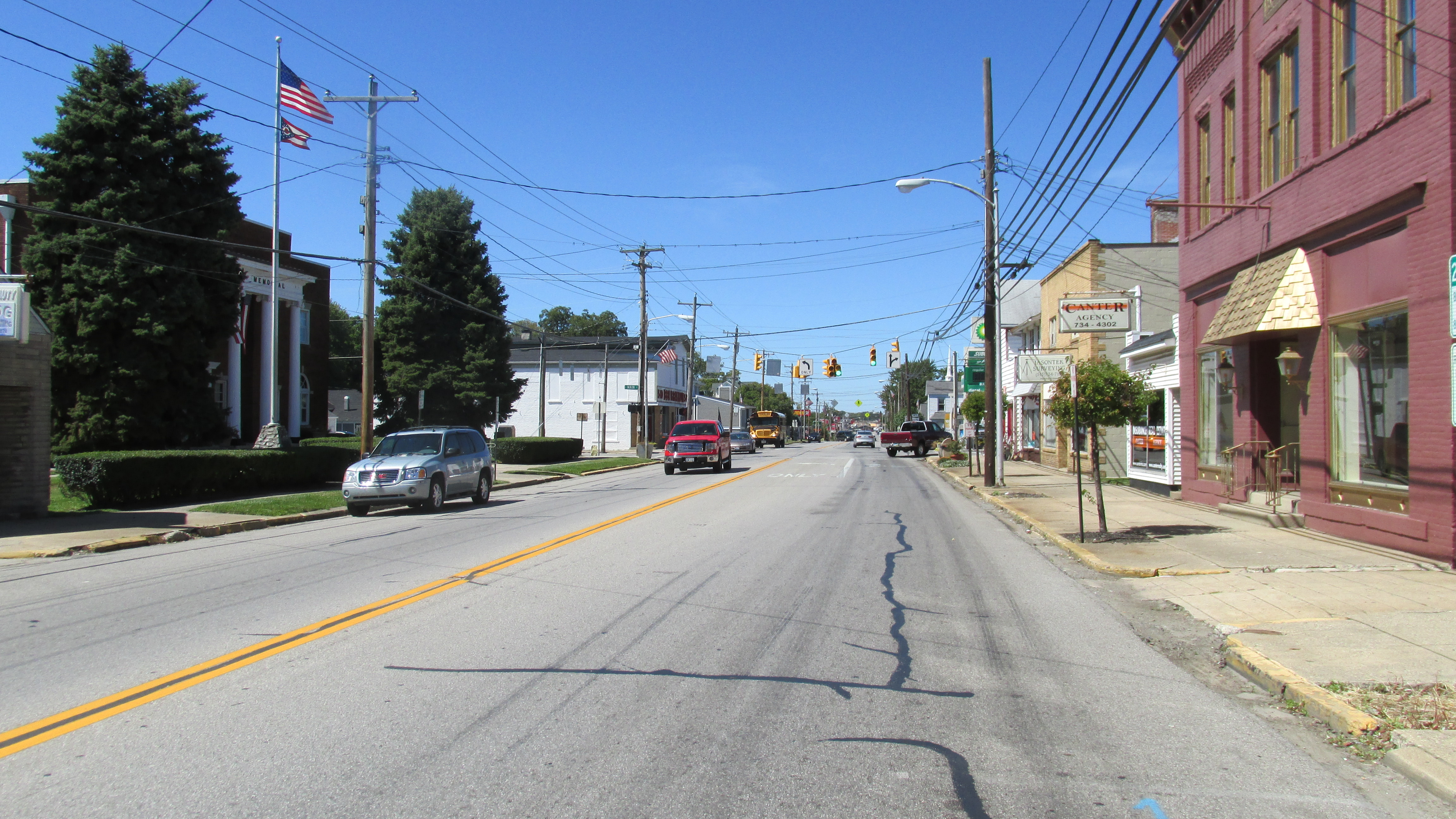
Looking west on East Plane Street in Bethel

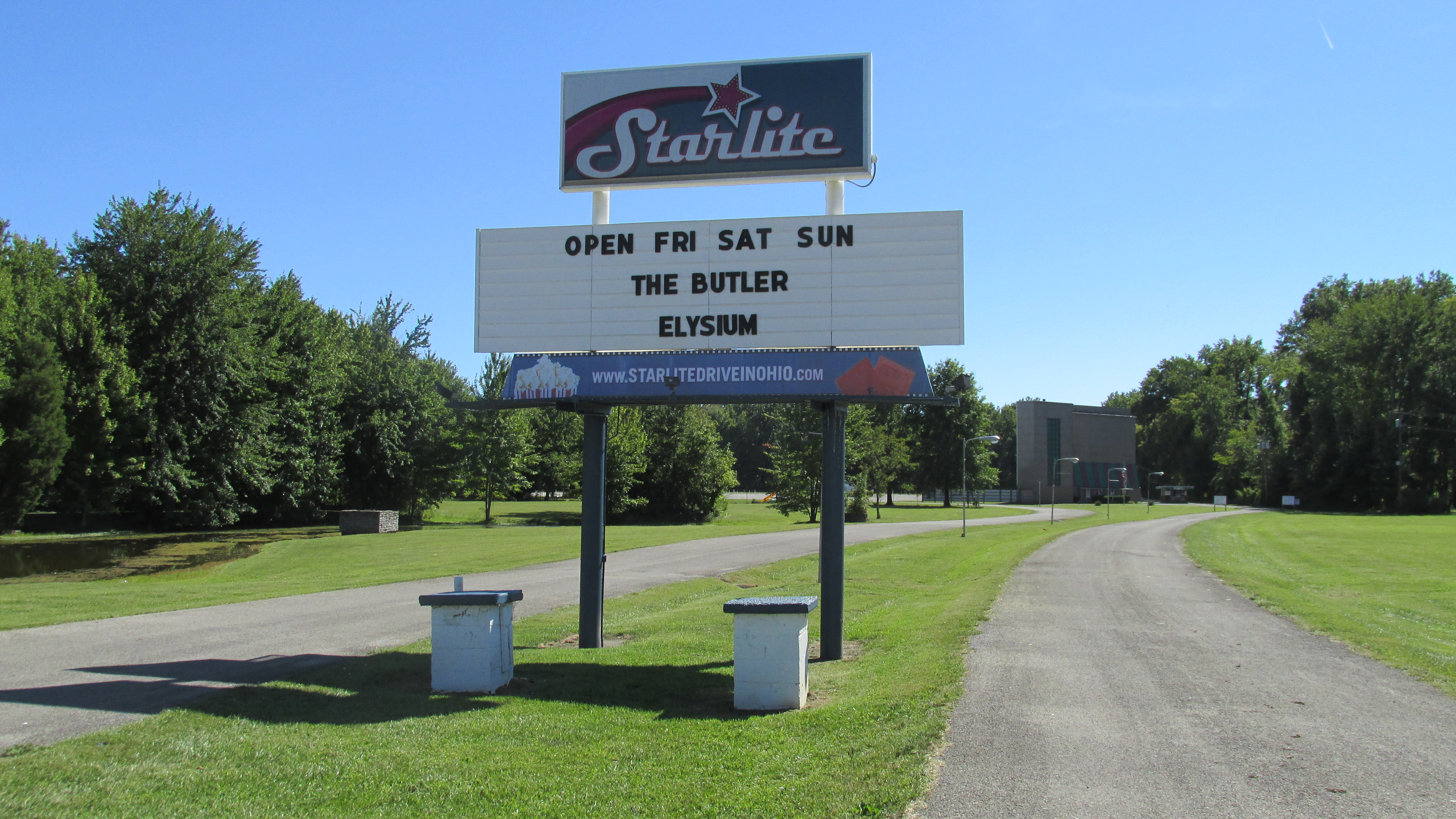
The Starlite Drive-In
