= Ohio State Route 286 =

State highway in southwestern Ohio, US

State Route 286

Route information
- Maintained by ODOT
- Length: 9.97 mi (16.05 km)
- Existed: 1931–present

Major junctions
- West end: US 50 / CR 47 near Fayetteville
- US 68 near Mount Orab
- East end: SR 134 near Sardinia

Location
- Country: United States
- State: Ohio
- Counties: Clermont, Brown, Highland

Highway system
- Ohio State Highway System; Interstate; US; State; Scenic
← SR 285	→ SR 287

State Route 286 (SR 286) is a 9.97-mile-long (16.05 km) east–west state highway in the southwestern portion of the U.S. state of Ohio. The western terminus of SR 286 is at U.S. Route 50 (US 50) nearly five miles (8.0 km) southwest of the village of Fayetteville. Its eastern terminus is at SR 134 approximately seven and a quarter miles (11.7 km) northwest of Sardinia.

== History ==
The SR 286 designation was applied in 1931. The highway originally ran from its present junction with US 68 (at the time the concurrency of SR 10 and SR 53) to its eastern terminus at SR 134.

In 1938, SR 286 was extended west-northwest along a previously un-numbered roadway to its present western terminus at US 50 southwest of Fayetteville.

== Major intersections ==
County	Location	mi	km	Destinations	Notes
Clermont	Jackson Township	0.00	0.00	US 50 / CR 47 (Formorin Road) – Owensville	
Brown	Green Township	5.16	8.30	US 68	
Highland	Clay Township	9.97	16.05	SR 134 / Hereford Road	
1.000 mi = 1.609 km; 1.000 km = 0.621 mi
