= Bantam, Ohio =

- Unincorporated community
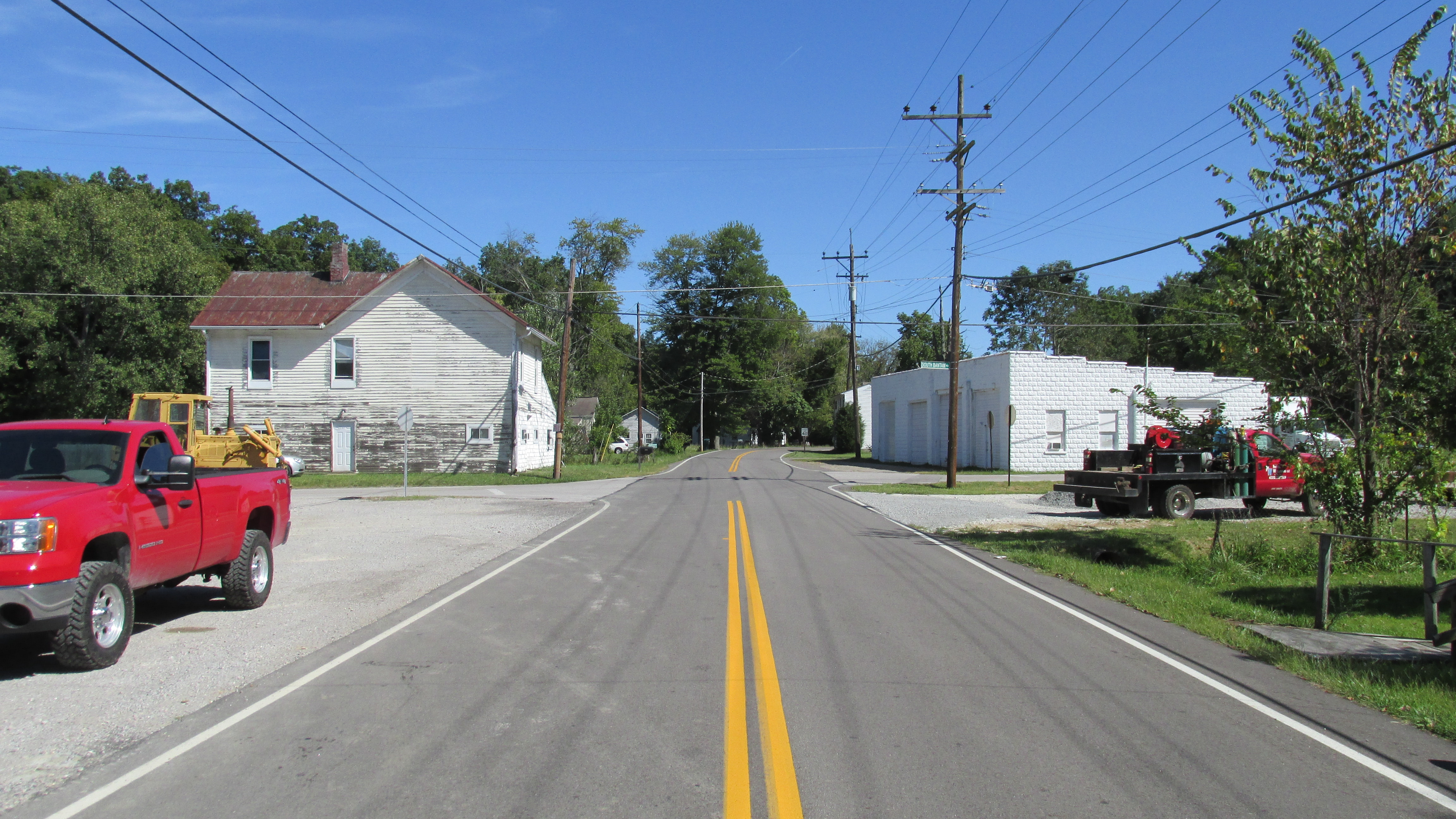
- Bantam Road

- Location within Ohio Location within the United States
- Coordinates: 38°59′55″N 84°08′29″W
- Country: United States
- State: Ohio
- County: Clermont
- Township: Tate
- Elevation: 863 ft (263 m)
- Time zone: UTC-5 (Eastern (EST))
  - Summer (DST): UTC-4 (EDT)
- Area code: 513
- GNIS feature ID: 1048485

Bantam is an unincorporated community in Clermont County, Ohio, United States. It is the location of Bethel Methodist Church, which is listed on the National Register of Historic Places.

The community is located in northwest Tate Township along Old State Route 125 (Bantam Road) and South Bantam Road, 4.2 miles northwest of Bethel. Years ago, to protect the county seat at Batavia, land from northern Bantam and other local communities was purchased by eminent domain to form the East Fork State Park flood prevention reservoir and its surrounding recreation areas. Travel north onto Elklick Road to enter the state park. The first Bantam post office was established in 1837. It eventually closed. Most of Bantam receives mail service from the Bethel post office.
