= John H. Wageman =

- Born: March 22, 1841; Amelia, Ohio
- Died: January 9, 1916 (aged 74)
- Burial place: Clover Cemetery Williamsburg, Ohio
- Military career
- Allegiance: United States of America
- Branch: United States Army; Union Army
- Rank: Private
- Units: Company I, 60th Ohio Infantry
- Conflicts: Second Battle of Petersburg
- Awards: Medal of Honor

John H. Wageman (March 22, 1841 - January 9, 1916) was an American soldier who fought for the Union Army during the American Civil War. He received the Medal of Honor for valor.

== Biography ==
Wageman served in the American Civil War in the 60th Ohio Infantry. He received the Medal of Honor on July 27, 1896 for his actions at the Second Battle of Petersburg on June 17, 1864.

== Medal of Honor citation ==
Citation:

Remained with the command after being severely wounded until he had fired all the cartridges in his possession, when he had to be carried from the field.

== Burial ==
Wageman is buried in the Clover Cemetery, located at Bass Road and State Route 133, which is southeast of Williamsburg, Ohio.

== See also ==
- List of American Civil War Medal of Honor recipients: T-Z
