= Sterling Township, Brown County, Ohio =

Township in Ohio, US

- Township
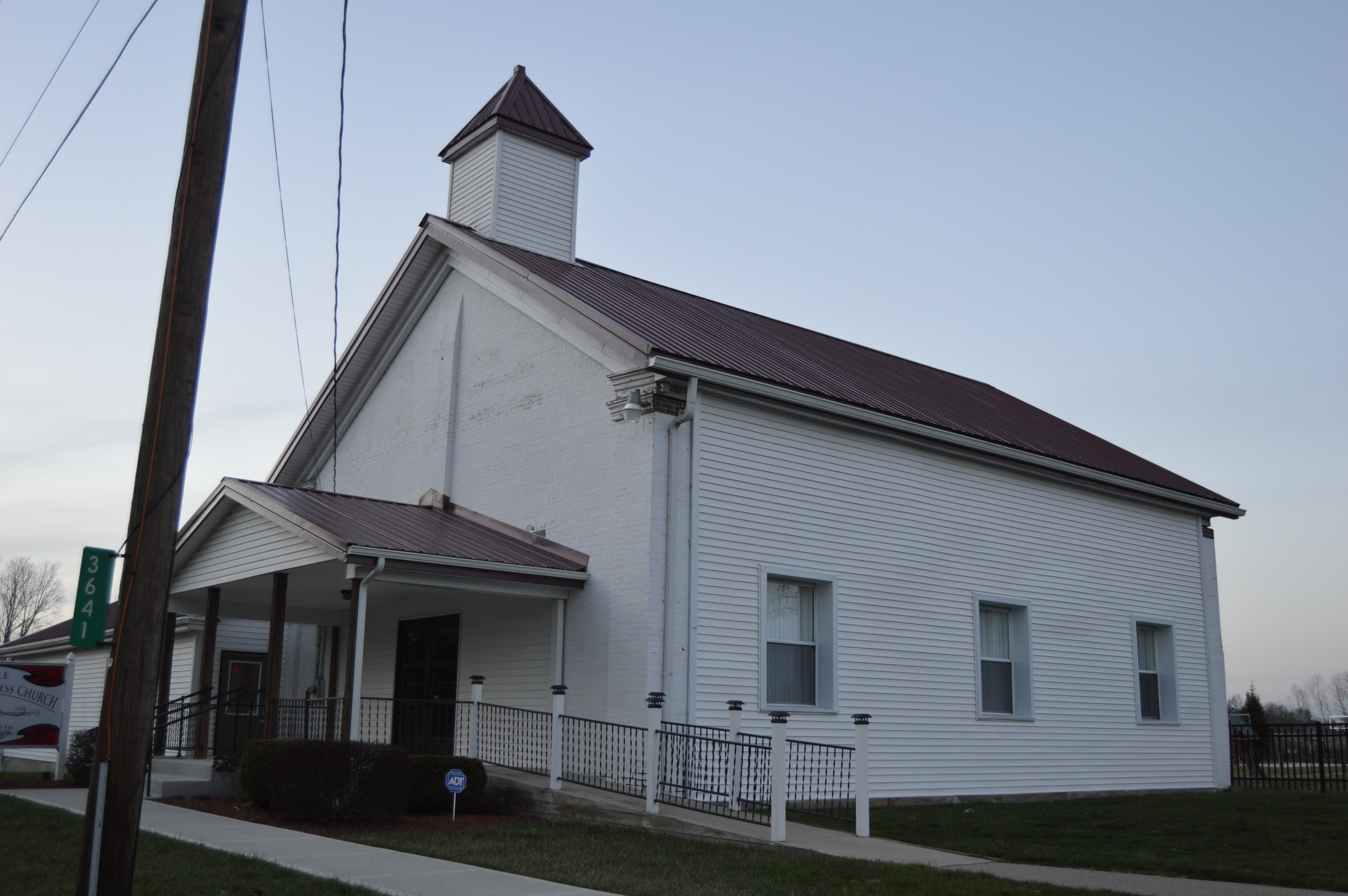
- Church on State Route 286 near Five Mile

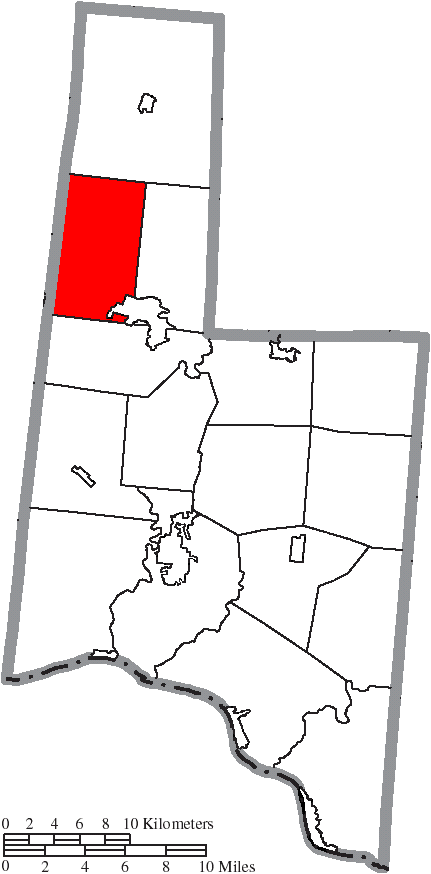
- Location of Sterling Township in Brown County
- Coordinates: 39°4′20″N 83°58′26″W
- Country: United States
- State: Ohio
- County: Brown

Area
  - Total: 28.4 sq mi (73.6 km^{2})
  - Land: 28.4 sq mi (73.6 km^{2})
  - Water: 0 sq mi (0.0 km^{2})
- Elevation: 922 ft (281 m)

Population (2020)
  - Total: 4,602
  - Density: 162/sq mi (62.5/km^{2})
- Time zone: UTC-5 (Eastern (EST))
  - Summer (DST): UTC-4 (EDT)
- FIPS code: 39-74559
- GNIS feature ID: 1085805
- Website: https://sterlingtownship.us/

Sterling Township is one of the sixteen townships of Brown County, Ohio, United States. The 2020 census recorded 4,602 people in the township.

== Geography ==
The Township is located in the northern extension of the county and borders the following townships:

- Perry Township - north
- Green Township - east
- Pike Township - south
- Williamsburg Township, Clermont County - southwest
- Jackson Township, Clermont County - northwest

Part of the village of Mount Orab is located in southeastern Sterling Township.

== Name and history ==
It is the only Sterling Township statewide.

Sterling Township was established in 1824 from land given by Perry and Pike townships.

== Government ==
The township is governed by a three-member board of trustees, who are elected in November of odd-numbered years to a four-year term beginning on the following January 1. Two are elected in the year after the presidential election and one is elected in the year before it. There is also an elected township fiscal officer, who serves a four-year term beginning on April 1 of the year after the election, which is held in November of the year before the presidential election. Vacancies in the fiscal officership or on the board of trustees are filled by the remaining trustees.
