= American Modern Insurance Group =

Insurance company in the US

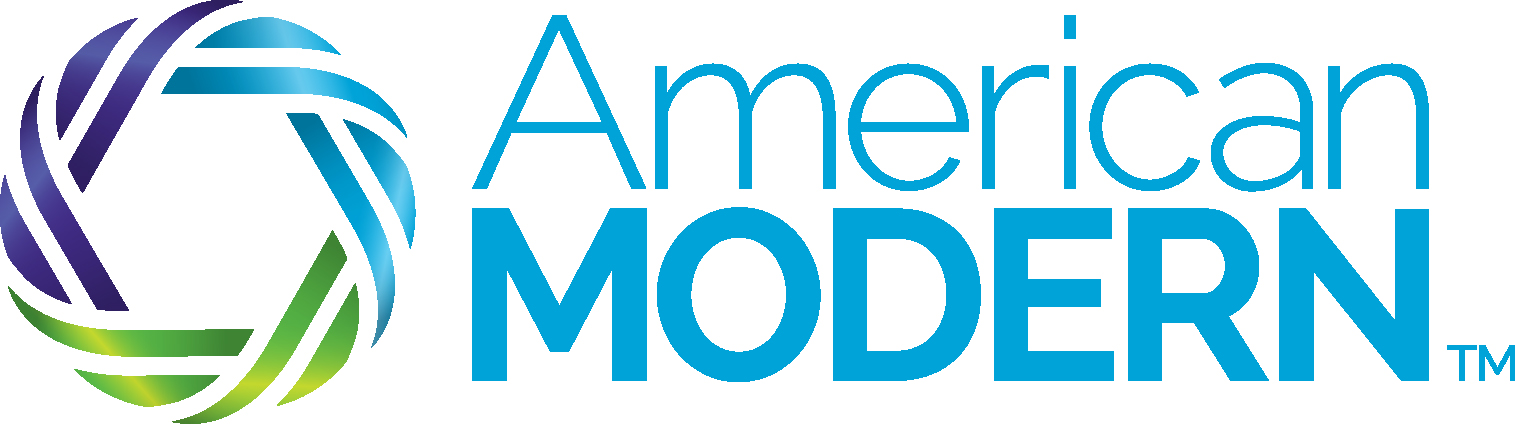
- Industry: Specialty Personal Insurance
- Founded: Initial Insurance Companies in 1965
- Headquarters: Batavia Township, Ohio, USA (Amelia mailing address)
- Area served: Nationwide
- Key people: Andreas Kleiner (CEO); René Gobonya (CFO), Kevin Morreale (Sales)
- Revenue: $1.42B (2015)
- Number of employees: 1,400 (March 2015)
- Parent: Munich Re
- Website: www.amig.com

American Modern Insurance Group, Inc., operating under the American Modern® insurance brand, is the holding company for a number of subsidiary property and casualty insurance companies that provide specialty products for owners of a variety of specialty dwellings such as houses, seasonal homes and mobile homes, and collectable or recreational vehicles such as watercraft, snowmobiles and motorcycles. They also provide pet insurance. Among its companies is American Family Home Insurance Company, but it is not affiliated with the mutual insurance company American Family Insurance.

The company also serves the commercial insurance needs of landlords, as well as of dealers and communities within the manufactured housing market. It also provides services and products to protect lender interests, including mortgage fire, debt cancellation, vendors single interest, collateral protection insurance, renters insurance, credit life and flood insurance.

The company's two initial insurance companies were founded in 1965 in Cincinnati, OH. Collectively, the insurance companies of American Modern Insurance Group are licensed to do business in all states.

American Modern's ultimate parent is Munich Re, one of the 100 largest companies in the world in annual revenue. It is part of Munich Re's primary insurance operations in the United States.

== History ==
American Modern Headquarters in Batavia Township, OH

The group's primary insurance companies were founded in 1965. But, its roots go back to 1938 when The Midland Discount Corporation was founded in Cincinnati as an automobile financing company during a time when the United States was working its way out of the Great Depression.

In 1949 Midland identified an emerging market in the mobile home industry and became one of the first companies to specialize in the mobile home finance business at both the wholesale and retail levels.

In February 1961 Midland made its initial public offering of stock to help finance expansion and, in 1965, it entered the manufactured home insurance marketplace with the establishment of American Modern Home Insurance Company and American Family Home Insurance Company, which remain to this day as the primary subsidiaries of American Modern Insurance Group.

The financial downturn of the mid-1970s hit the mobile home industry particularly hard and resulted in the discontinuation of the company's finance operations in February 1976.

In 1990, Midland's insurance subsidiary, American Modern Insurance Group, began an important diversification into lines of business beyond manufactured homes, starting with watercraft insurance and then collector vehicle insurance a few years later.

American Modern Insurance Group expanded into the motorcycle, ATV and snowmobile markets in 2000 with the purchase of GuideOne Motorsport's book of business.

The company continued to diversify its product offerings in the first decade of the 21st century to meet special needs in the site built home market, such as vacant, seasonal and rental homes. It also expanded its portfolio of single and dual interest products—including credit life and disability insurance—that were marketed to the financial community through its Financial Institutions Division.

In 2008 Midland and its subsidiaries were purchased by Munich Re, an international company with approximately 47,000 employees doing business in more than 40 countries. American Modern is part of its primary insurance operations in the United States focusing on penetrating the specialty segment of the market.

== Distribution ==
The company takes its products to market through a variety of distribution channels. Licensed dealers and lenders offer insurance to buyers of manufactured homes to facilitate the closing process and protect lender collateral. Independent agents and general agents use the company's products to satisfy specialty product needs not adequately served by standard lines carriers. Other insurance companies form alliances with American Modern to provide "account rounding" products for their agents in lines they choose not to offer.

== Companies ==
The subsidiary companies of American Modern Insurance Group are rated A+ (Superior) by A.M. Best and the group has been selected for 13 consecutive years as one of the Top 50 property and casualty insurance companies in the United States by the Ward Financial Group. It is part of Munich Re's US operations. American Modern has 9 primary property and casualty insurance subsidiaries.

Property and casualty subsidiaries include:

- American Modern Home Insurance Company - The flagship company, used in nearly all states for all targeted lines of specialty business. Does business as American Modern Insurance Company in California.
- American Family Home Insurance Company – Does business as AFH Insurance Company in California.
- American Southern Home Insurance Company
- American Modern Lloyds Insurance Company
- American Modern Select Insurance Company
- American Western Home Insurance Company - Primarily writes non-admitted commercial business.
- American Modern Insurance Company of Florida, Inc. - Used only in Florida for some personal lines programs.
- American Modern Surplus Lines Insurance Company - Used in many states for non-admitted business.
- American Modern Property and Casualty Insurance Company
