= Batavia Township, Ohio =

Township in Ohio, US

- Township
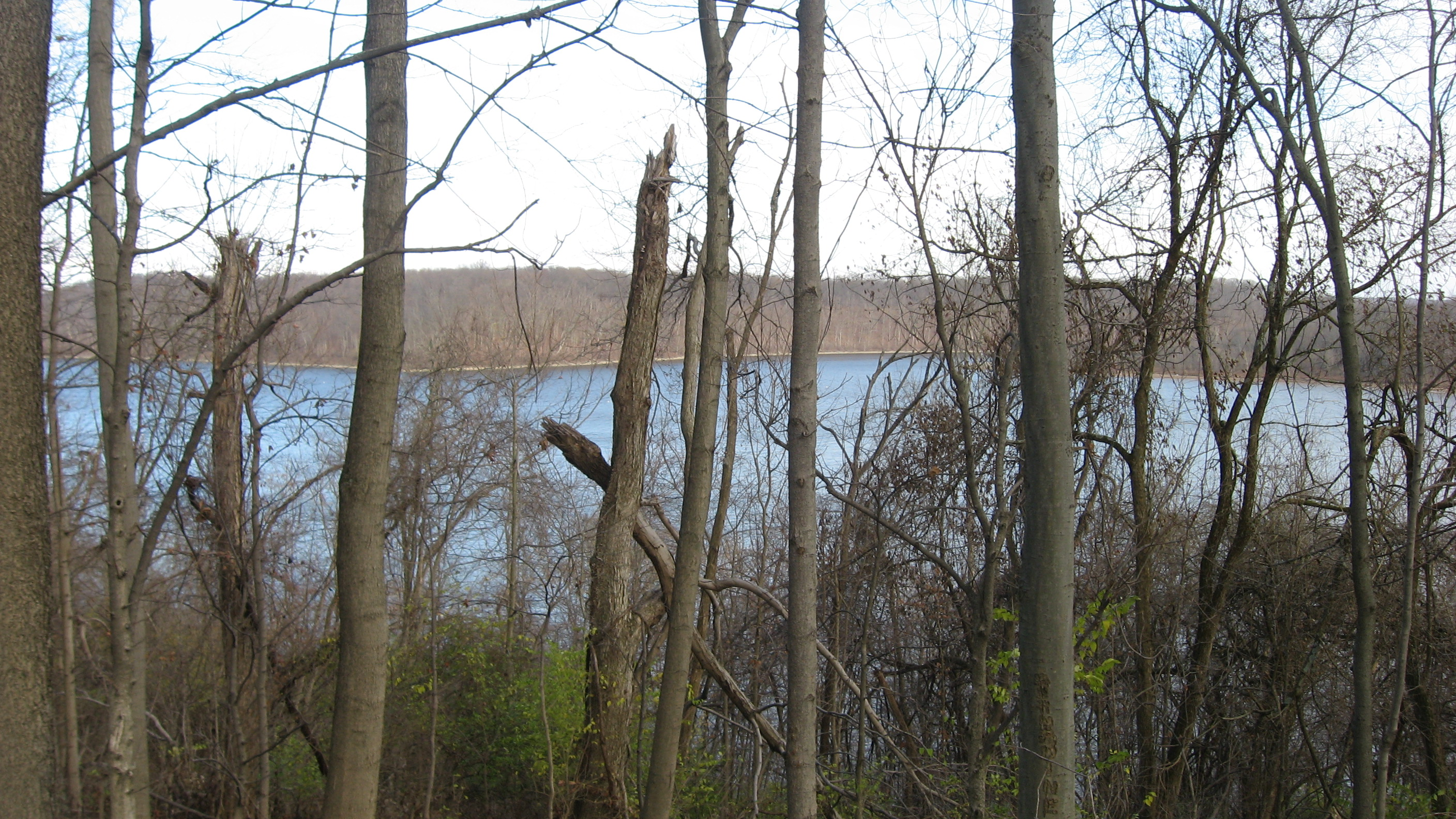
- Lake at East Fork State Park in the township's far southeast

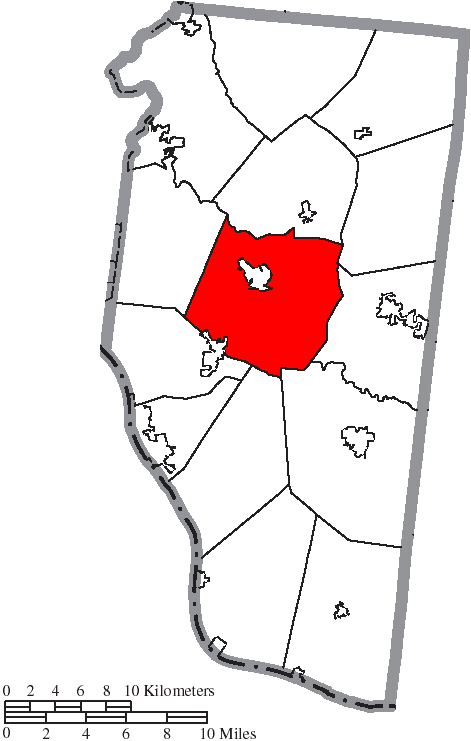
- Location of Batavia Township in Clermont County
- Coordinates: 39°4′1″N 84°10′23″W
- Country: United States
- State: Ohio
- County: Clermont

Area
  - Total: 41.6 sq mi (107.7 km^{2})
  - Land: 39.7 sq mi (102.9 km^{2})
  - Water: 1.9 sq mi (4.8 km^{2})
- Elevation: 823 ft (251 m)

Population (2020)
  - Total: 27,660
  - Density: 586/sq mi (226.2/km^{2})
- Time zone: UTC-5 (Eastern (EST))
  - Summer (DST): UTC-4 (EDT)
- ZIP code: 45103
- Area code: 513
- FIPS code: 39-04157
- GNIS feature ID: 1085861
- Website: bataviatownship.org

Batavia Township is one of the fourteen townships of Clermont County, Ohio, United States. The population was 27,660 as of the 2020 census.

== Geography ==
Located in the center of the county, it borders the following townships:

- Stonelick Township - north
- Jackson Township - northeast
- Williamsburg Township - east
- Tate Township - southeast
- Monroe Township - south
- Pierce Township - southwest
- Union Township - northwest

The incorporated village and county seat of Batavia is located in the center of the Township. Parts of the census-designated place and former village of Amelia (dissolved in 2019) are located in the southwest.

== Name and history ==
Batavia Township was organized in 1815. It is the only Batavia Township statewide.

As a result of tax abatements for a residential development in the Village of Batavia, the township passed a resolution in December 2025 to separate from the joint fire department with the village.

== Economy ==
American Modern Insurance Group, Inc. and Milacron are based in the township.

The township was home to Ford Motor Company's Batavia Transmission plant until it closed in 2009 under a corporate plan called "The Way Forward". It also anchored an industrial area that also includes rollercoaster manufacturer Clermont Steel Fabricators.

== Government ==
The township is governed by a three-member board of trustees, who are elected in November of odd-numbered years to a four-year term beginning on the following January 1. Two are elected in the year after the presidential election and one is elected in the year before it. There is also an elected township fiscal officer, who serves a four-year term beginning on April 1 of the year after the election, which is held in November of the year before the presidential election. Vacancies in the fiscal officership or on the board of trustees are filled by the remaining trustees.

== Infrastructure ==
The Clermont County Airport is located two nautical miles (2.3 mi; 3.7 km) west of the Village of Batavia's central business district.

The Cincinnati Eastern Railroad passes through the township.

== Education ==
University of Cincinnati Clermont College, a regional campus of the University of Cincinnati, is in the township. UC Clermont's satellite campus, UC East, operates out of the administrative offices of the former Ford plant. Due to declining enrollment at UC Clermont, UC East was closed and is vacated as of 2020.

== Media ==
WOBO-FM broadcasts from the township at 88.7 MHz.
