= Bethel Methodist Church (Bantam, Ohio) =

Historic church in Ohio, United States

- U.S. National Register of Historic Places
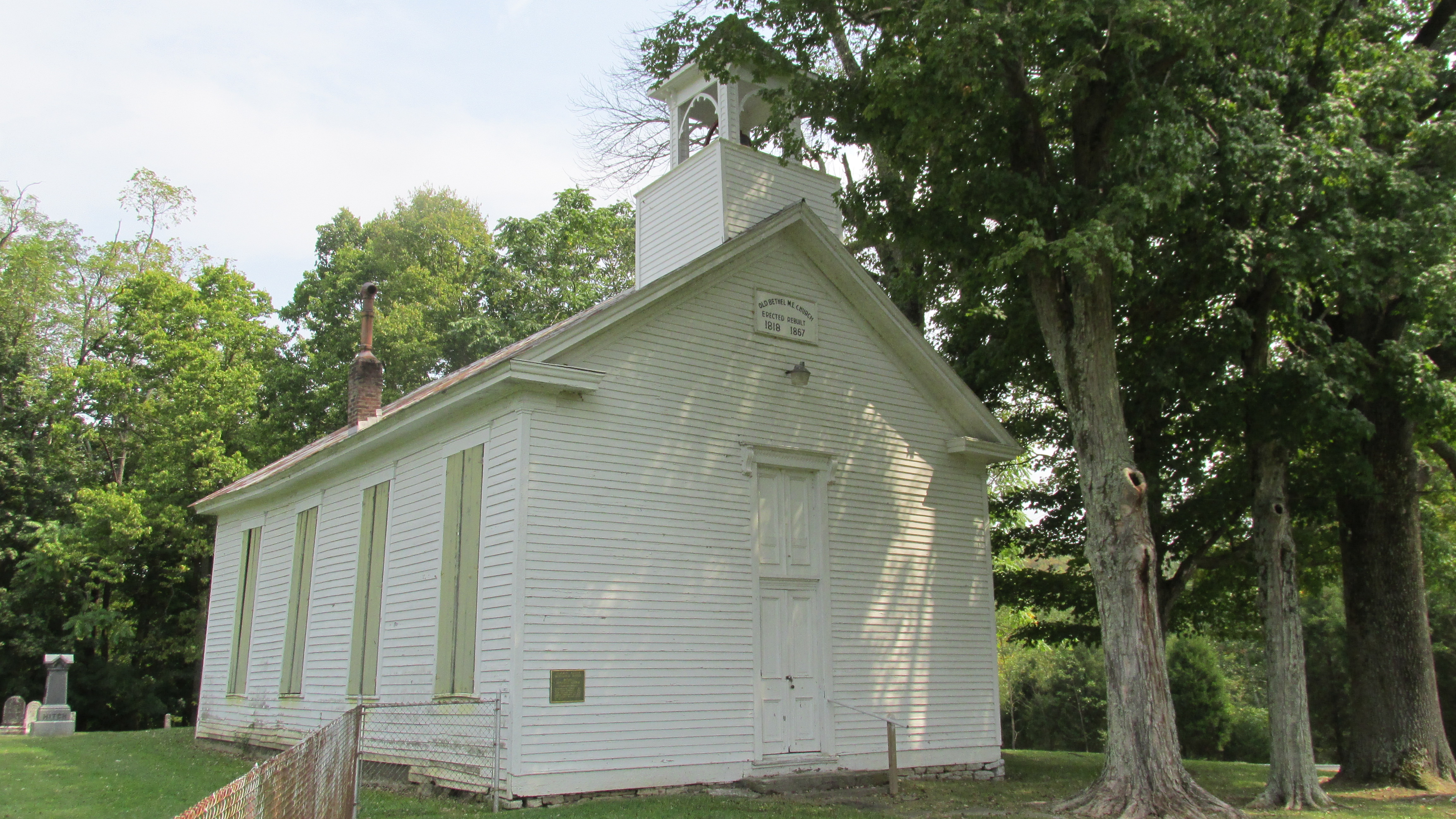
- Front and southern side in 2013

- Location within Ohio Location within the United States
- Location: 1 mile north of Bantam, Ohio, on Elk Lick Road
- Coordinates: 39°0′27″N 84°8′18″W
- Area: less than one acre
- Built: 1818
- Architect: John Collins
- NRHP reference No.: 78002020
- Added to NRHP: August 11, 1978

Bethel Methodist Church is a historic Methodist church building in rural Clermont County, Ohio, United States. Built in the 1810s under the leadership of one of Ohio's earliest Methodist preachers, it has survived the death of its congregation, and it remains in use for community activities. Together with its cemetery, the building continues to be used occasionally, and it has been named a historic site.

== History ==
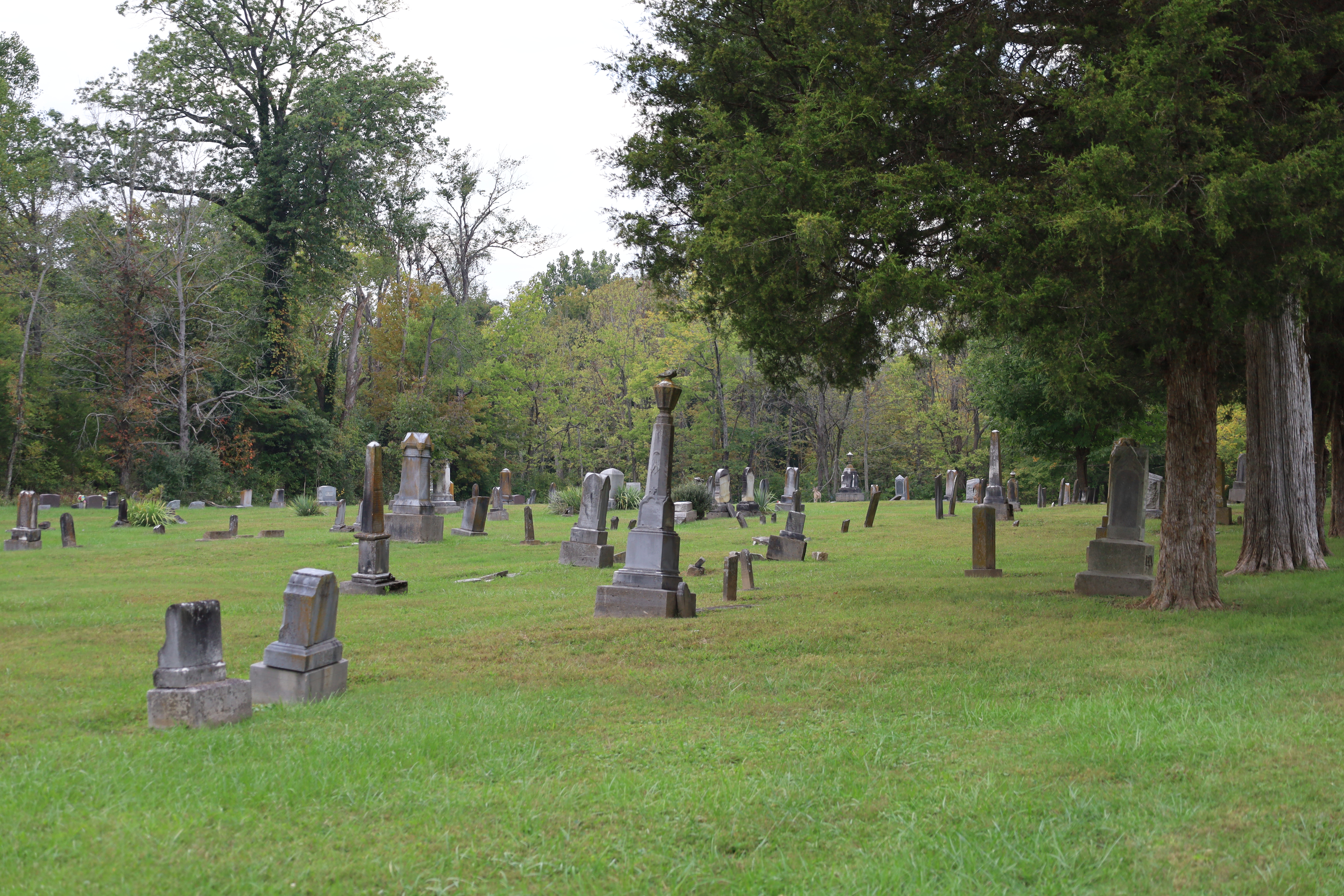
The church cemetery in 2021

The pioneer minister at Bethel was New Jersey native John Collins, who migrated to the Northwest Territory in 1802. Local legend asserts that he was the first Methodist Episcopal preacher in what has since become the Cincinnati metropolitan area, although Ohio's oldest Methodist church was formed in a preacher's house at Milford in 1797. Collins started Methodist classes throughout much of southern Ohio, including Bantam, Chillicothe, Dayton, Hillsboro, and Lebanon. When the congregation at Bantam was founded in 1805, the members named it "Bethel" and built a log church building, but the original structure remained for only a short time; the present church building replaced it in 1818. Substantial changes were made in 1867, although the core of the 1818 structure still stands.

The congregation closed in 1968: when the Corps of Engineers bought large amounts of land to create East Fork State Park, all area residents were forced out, and no members remained to continue worshiping at Bethel. Today, the building is used just twice annually: a Memorial Day service is held in conjunction with an American Legion post, and a homecoming event each fall includes a service.

== Architecture ==
Bethel is a simple vernacular building, a frame rectangular gable-front structure. Sitting atop the eastern end of the church is a square belfry. Built with weatherboarded walls, the church rests on a stone foundation. Its southern side is divided into four bays with twelve-over-twelve sash windows. Surrounding the building is the church graveyard; among its hundreds of burials are dozens of unknown soldiers and the grandparents of U.S. President Ulysses S. Grant, a Clermont County native.

== Historic site ==
In 1978, the former Bethel Methodist Church was listed on the National Register of Historic Places, qualifying both because of its architecture and because of its connection to John Collins. Nearby lies another National Register-listed location, the Elk Lick Road Mound, an Indian mound constructed by peoples of the Adena culture.
