= Marathon, Ohio =

Unincorporated community in Ohio, U.S.

Coordinates: 39°08′43″N 84°00′23″W

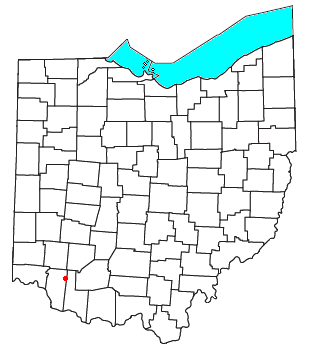
Location of Marathon, Ohio

Marathon is an unincorporated community and Census-designated place in northeastern Jackson Township, Clermont County, Ohio, United States. As of the 2020 census, Marathon had a population of 155. Although it is unincorporated, it had a post office, with the ZIP code 45145. The current ZIP code is 45118. It lies along U.S. Route 50.

== History ==
Marathon was originally called Cynthiana; the town was laid out in 1838 under the latter name. A post office called Marathon was established in 1845, and remained in operation until its discontinuation in 2011.

== Gallery ==
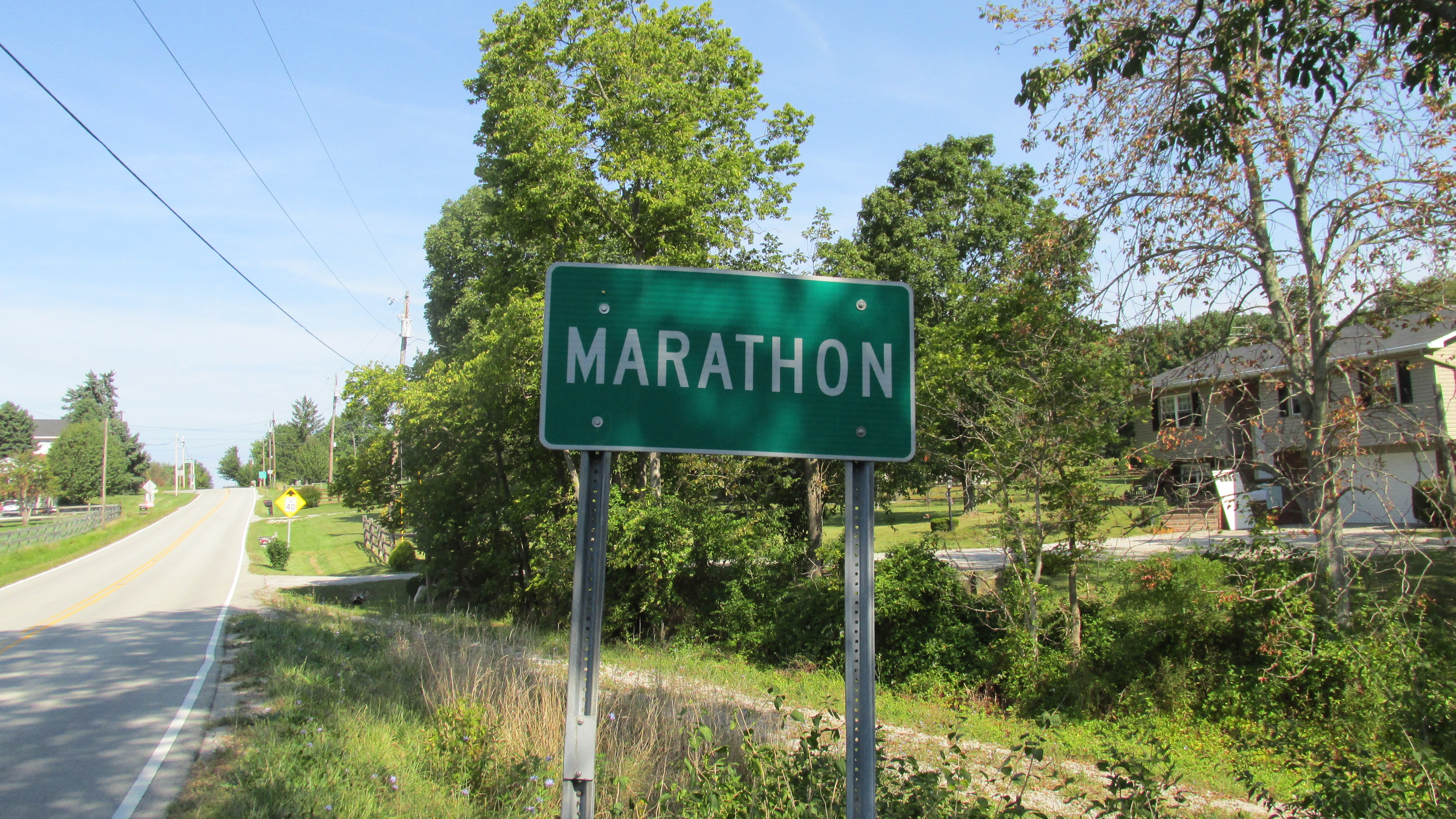
Marathon community sign

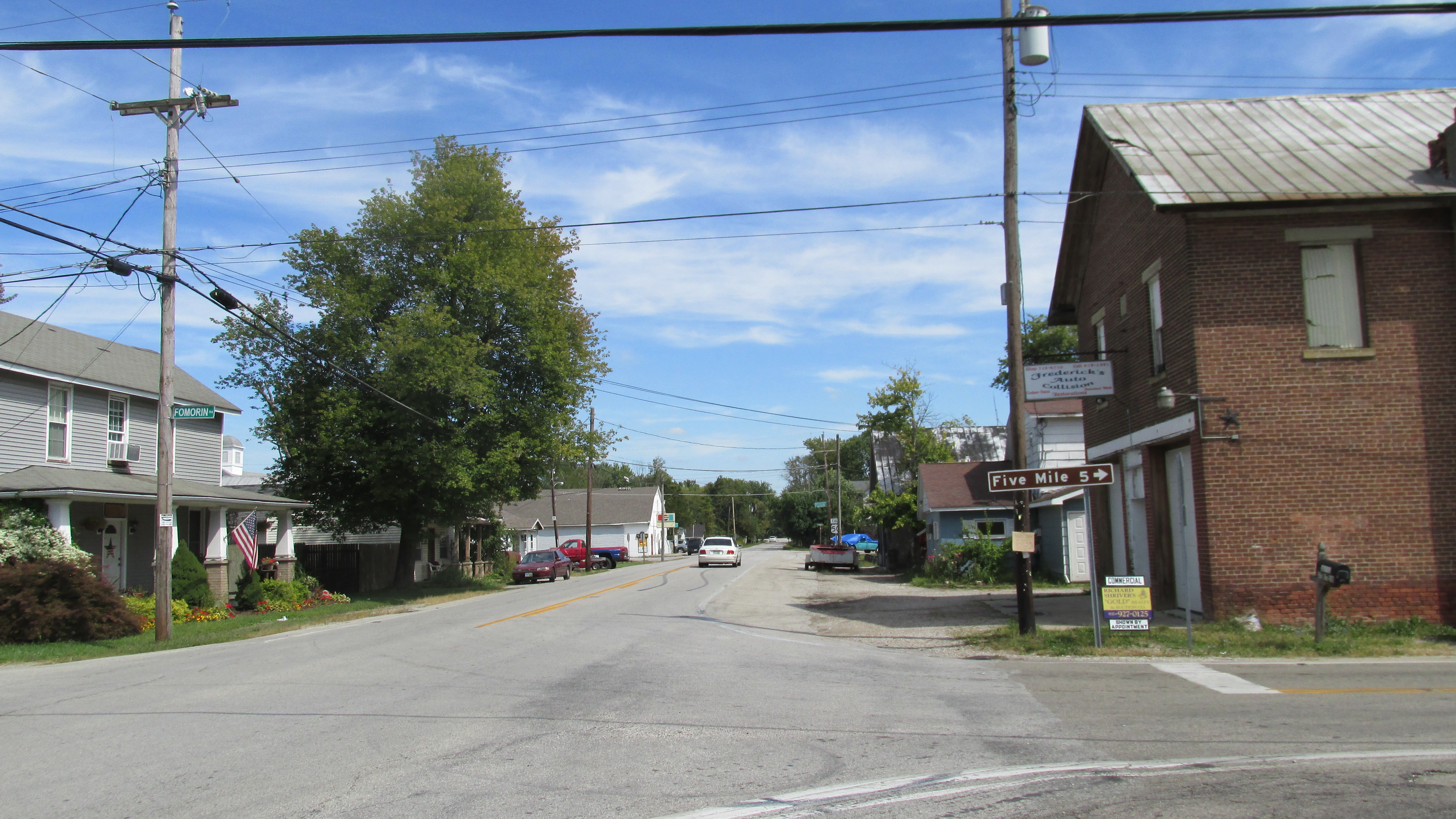
Looking east on Main Street (US Highway 50) in Marathon
