= Williamsburg Township, Clermont County, Ohio =

Township in Ohio, US

- Township
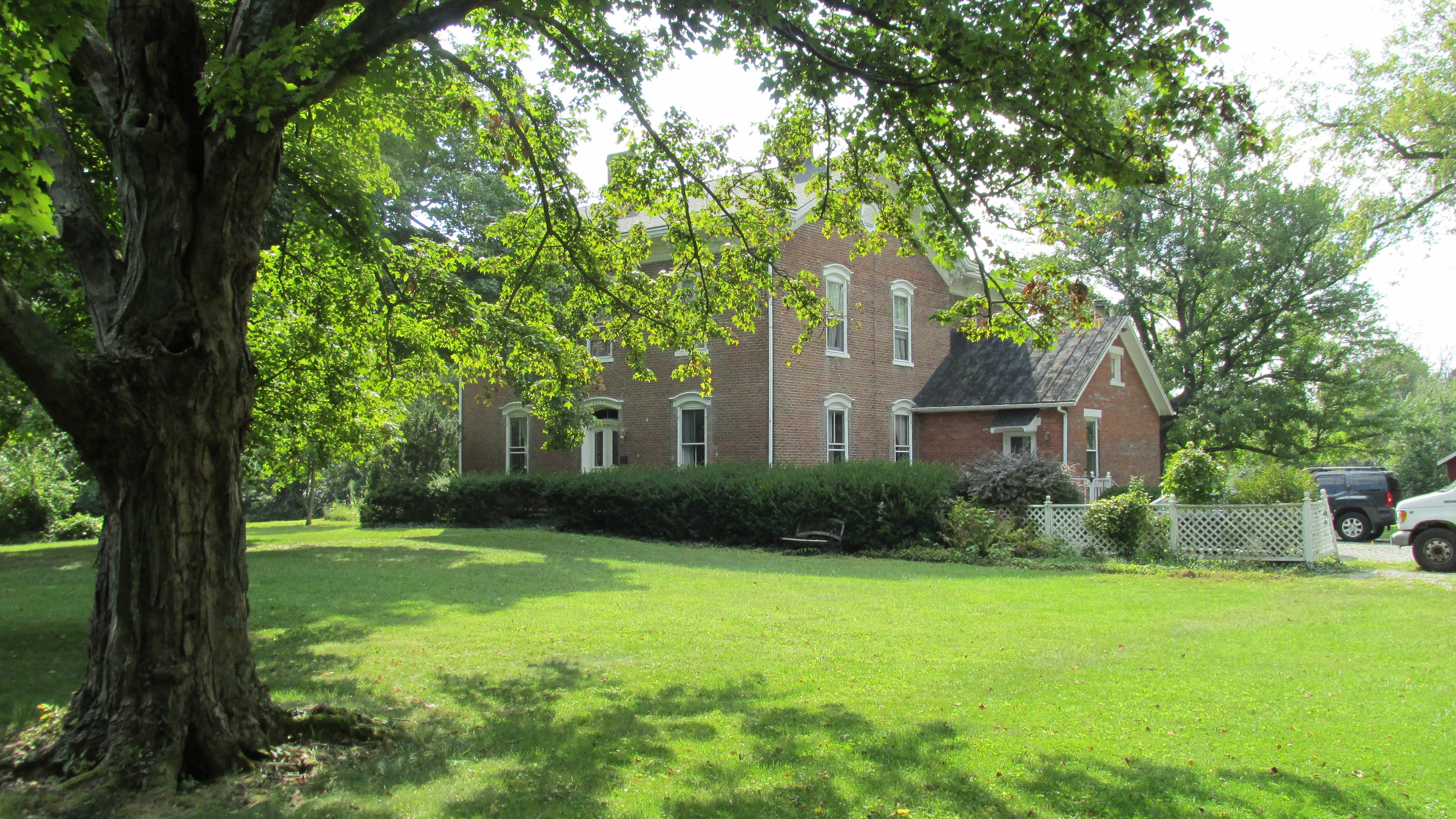
- Lewis McKever Farmhouse

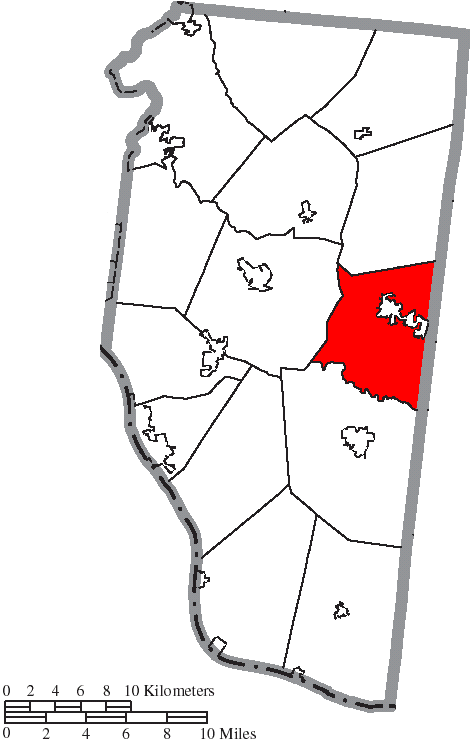
- Location of Williamsburg Township in Clermont County
- Coordinates: 39°3′4″N 84°3′49″W
- Country: United States
- State: Ohio
- County: Clermont

Area
  - Total: 31.2 sq mi (80.7 km^{2})
  - Land: 30.1 sq mi (77.9 km^{2})
  - Water: 1.1 sq mi (2.8 km^{2})
- Elevation: 758 ft (231 m)

Population (2020)
  - Total: 5,682
  - Density: 191/sq mi (73.8/km^{2})
- Time zone: UTC-5 (Eastern (EST))
  - Summer (DST): UTC-4 (EDT)
- ZIP code: 45176
- Area code: 513
- FIPS code: 39-85302
- GNIS feature ID: 1085875
- Website: williamsburgtownship.org

Williamsburg Township is one of the fourteen townships of Clermont County, Ohio, United States. The population was 5,682 at the 2020 census.

== Geography ==
Located in the eastern part of the county, it borders the following townships:

- Jackson Township - north
- Sterling Township, Brown County - northeast
- Pike Township, Brown County - east
- Clark Township, Brown County - southeast corner
- Tate Township - south
- Batavia Township - west

The village of Williamsburg is located in eastern Williamsburg Township.

== Name and history ==
It is the only Williamsburg Township statewide.

In 2024, Purina announced that it was building a new plant in the township.

== Government ==
The township is governed by a three-member board of trustees, who are elected in November of odd-numbered years to a four-year term beginning on the following January 1. Two are elected in the year after the presidential election and one is elected in the year before it. There is also an elected township fiscal officer, who serves a four-year term beginning on April 1 of the year after the election, which is held in November of the year before the presidential election. Vacancies in the fiscal officership or on the board of trustees are filled by the remaining trustees.
