= Tate Township, Clermont County, Ohio =

Township in Ohio, US

- Township
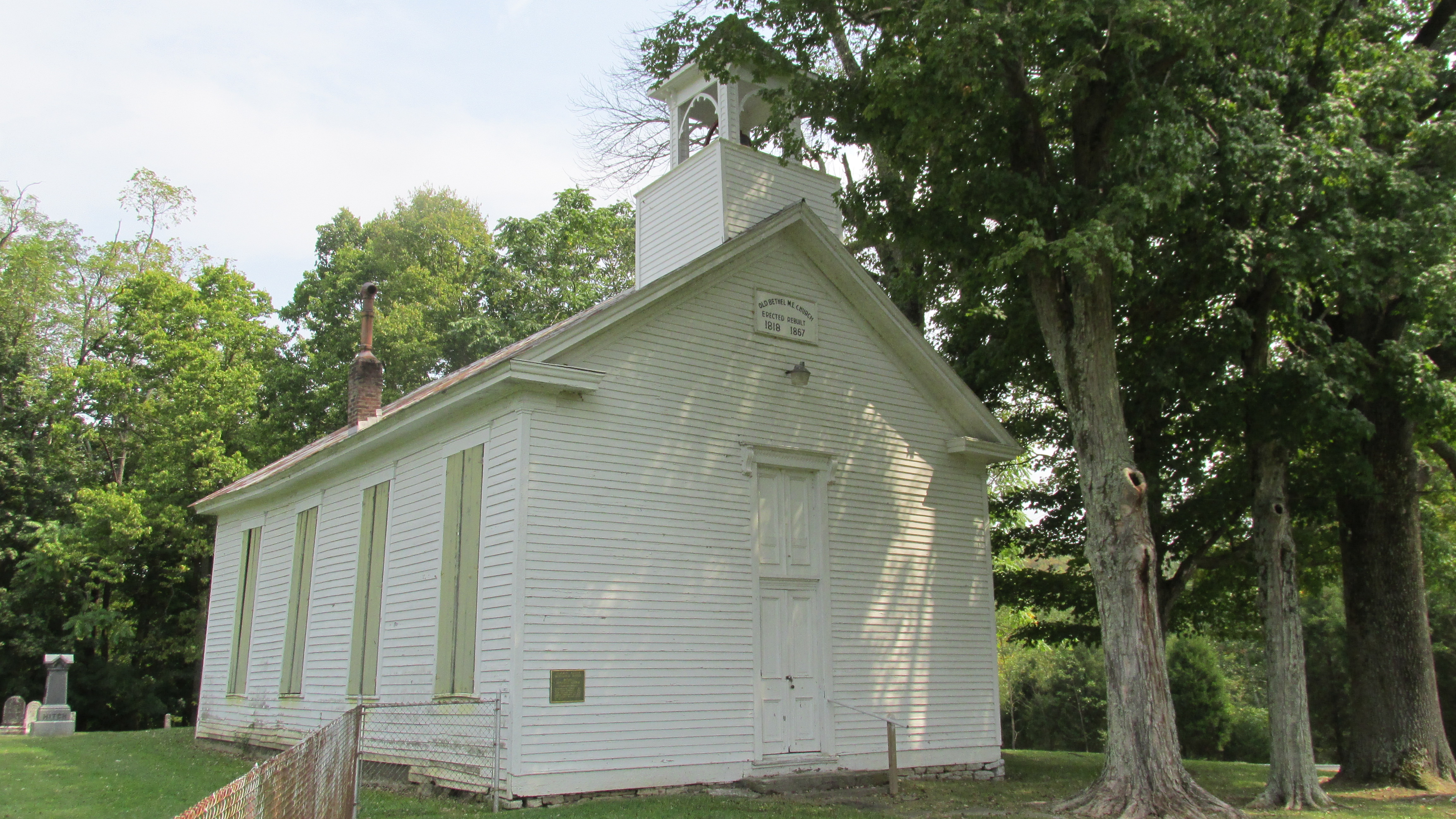
- Former Bethel Methodist Church

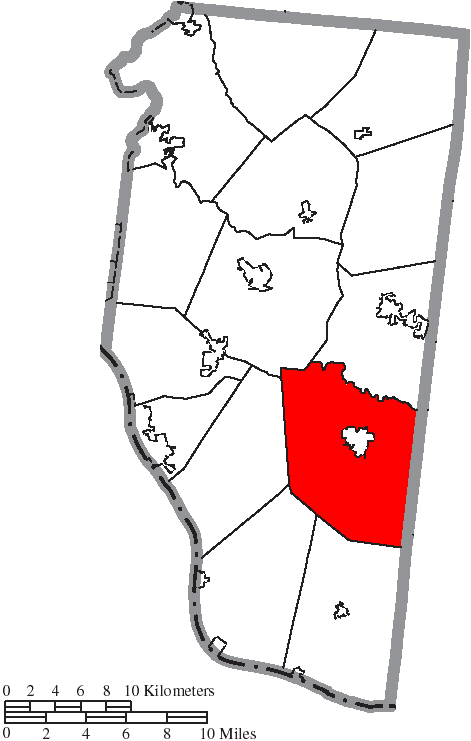
- Location of Tate Township in Clermont County
- Coordinates: 38°57′27″N 84°5′43″W
- Country: United States
- State: Ohio
- County: Clermont

Area
  - Total: 47.5 sq mi (122.9 km^{2})
  - Land: 46.6 sq mi (120.7 km^{2})
  - Water: 0.85 sq mi (2.2 km^{2})
- Elevation: 879 ft (268 m)

Population (2020)
  - Total: 9,162
  - Density: 201/sq mi (77.5/km^{2})
- Time zone: UTC-5 (Eastern (EST))
  - Summer (DST): UTC-4 (EDT)
- FIPS code: 39-76155
- GNIS feature ID: 1085871
- Website: tatetownship.org

Tate Township is one of the fourteen townships of Clermont County, Ohio, United States. The population was 9,162 at the 2020 census.

== Geography ==
Located in the southeastern part of the county, it borders the following townships:

- Williamsburg Township - north
- Pike Township, Brown County - northeast corner
- Clark Township, Brown County - east
- Lewis Township, Brown County - southeast
- Franklin Township - south
- Washington Township - southwest
- Monroe Township - west
- Batavia Township - northwest

The village of Bethel is located in central Tate Township. Public education is provided by the Bethel-Tate School District.

== Name and history ==
It is the only Tate Township statewide.

== Government ==
The township is governed by a three-member board of trustees, who are elected in November of odd-numbered years to a four-year term beginning on the following January 1. Two are elected in the year after the presidential election and one is elected in the year before it. There is also an elected township fiscal officer, who serves a four-year term beginning on April 1 of the year after the election, which is held in November of the year before the presidential election. Vacancies in the fiscal officership or on the board of trustees are filled by the remaining trustees.
