= Pike Township, Brown County, Ohio =

Township in Ohio, US

- Township
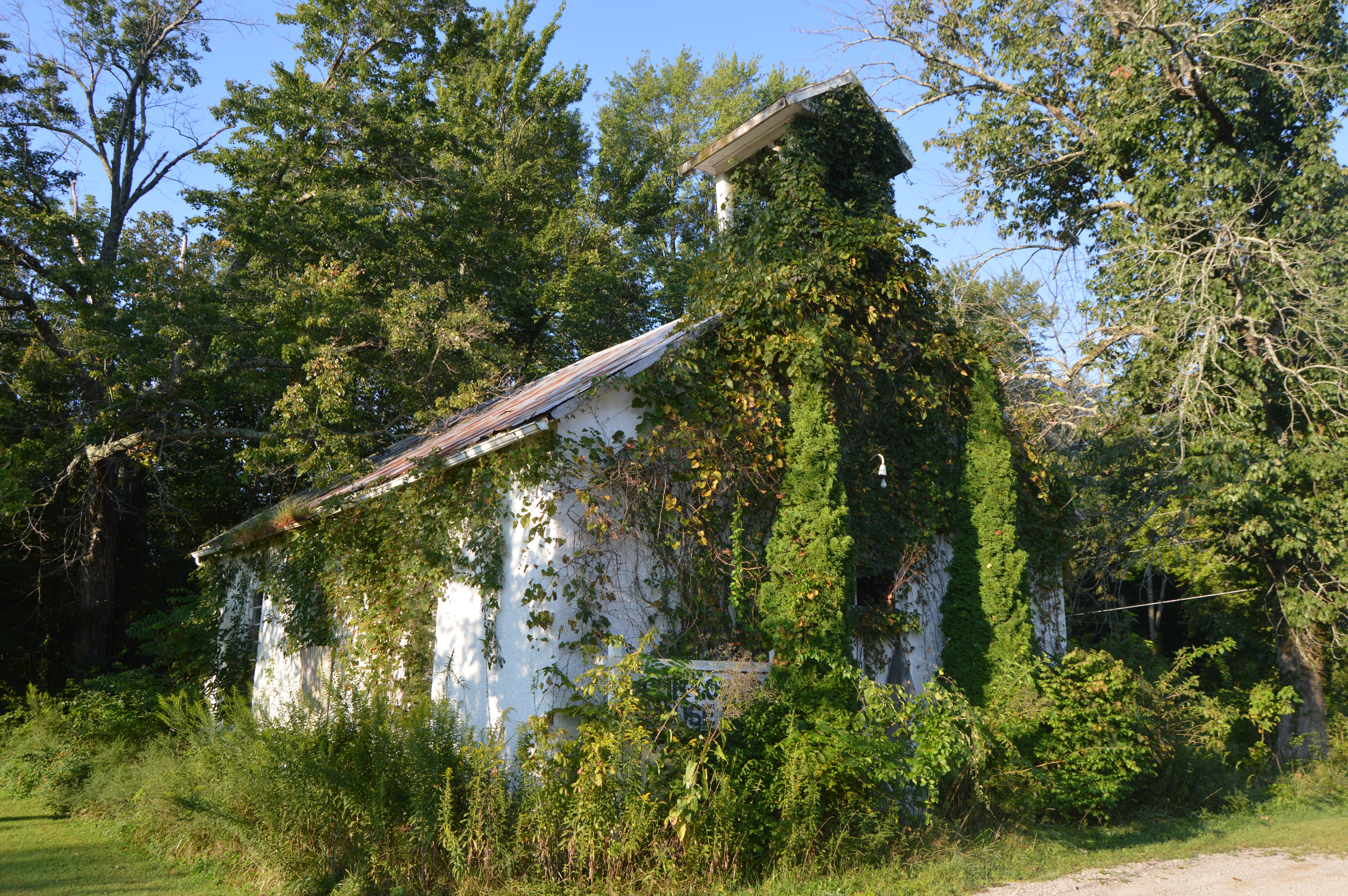
- Abandoned church on Oakland-Locust Ridge Road

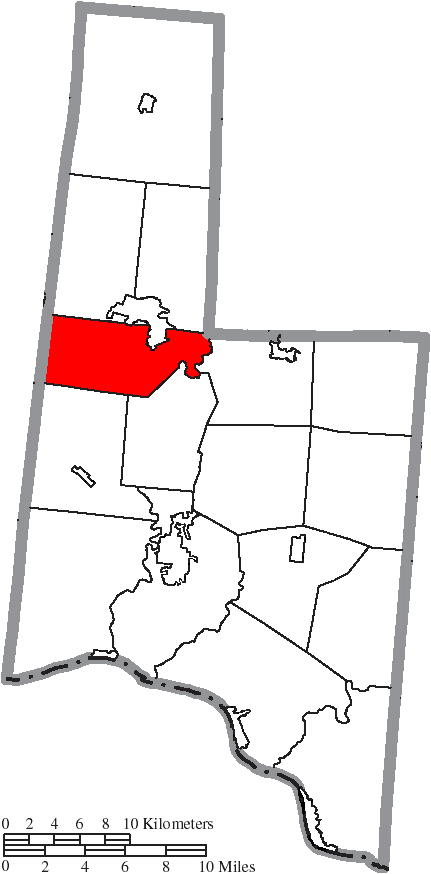
- Location of Pike Township in Brown County
- Coordinates: 39°0′40″N 83°57′3″W
- Country: United States
- State: Ohio
- County: Brown

Area
  - Total: 24.5 sq mi (63.5 km^{2})
  - Land: 24.2 sq mi (62.8 km^{2})
  - Water: 0.23 sq mi (0.6 km^{2})
- Elevation: 942 ft (287 m)

Population (2020)
  - Total: 4,134
  - Density: 170/sq mi (65.8/km^{2})
- Time zone: UTC-5 (Eastern (EST))
  - Summer (DST): UTC-4 (EDT)
- FIPS code: 39-62596
- GNIS feature ID: 1085802
- Website: https://piketwp.org/6/index.php

Pike Township is one of the sixteen townships of Brown County, Ohio, United States. The 2020 census found 4,134 people in the township.

== Geography ==
Located in the western part of the county, it borders the following townships:

- Sterling Township - north, west of Green Township
- Green Township - north, east of Sterling Township
- Clay Township, Highland County - northeast corner
- Washington Township - east
- Scott Township - southeast
- Clark Township - south
- Tate Township, Clermont County - southwest corner
- Williamsburg Township, Clermont County - west

Part of the village of Mount Orab is located in northern Pike Township.

== Name and history ==
It is one of eight Pike Townships statewide.

Pike Township was established in 1823 from land given by Clark Township.

== Government ==
The township is governed by a three-member board of trustees, who are elected in November of odd-numbered years to a four-year term beginning on the following January 1. Two are elected in the year after the presidential election and one is elected in the year before it. There is also an elected township fiscal officer, who serves a four-year term beginning on April 1 of the year after the election, which is held in November of the year before the presidential election. Vacancies in the fiscal officership or on the board of trustees are filled by the remaining trustees.
