= Mount Orab, Ohio =

- City
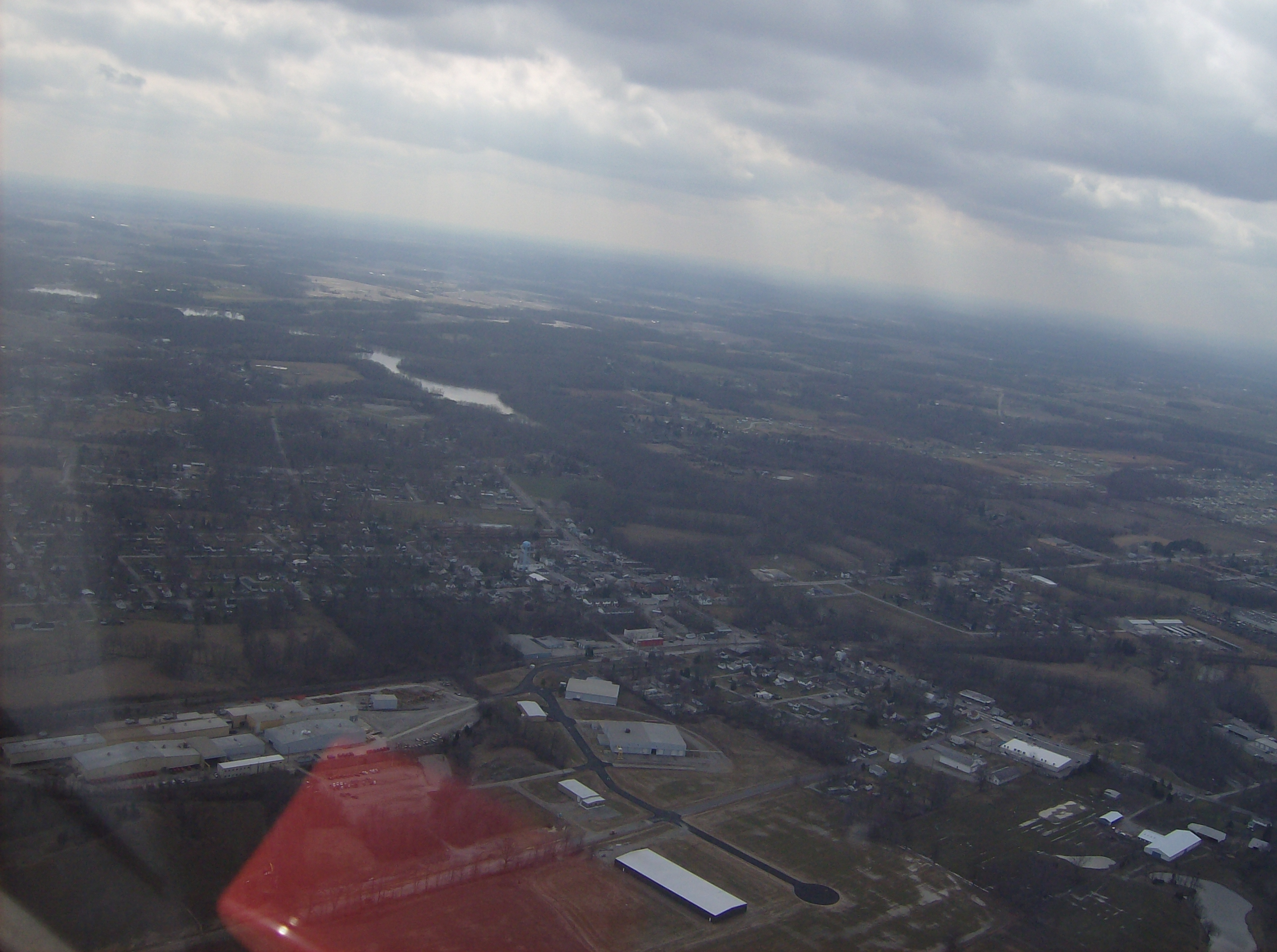
- Aerial view of central Mt. Orab

- Logo

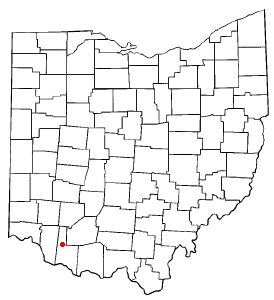
- Location of Mount Orab, Ohio

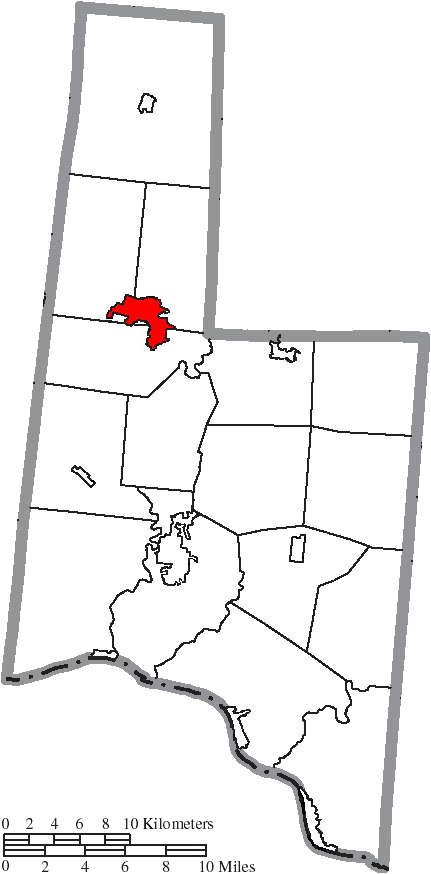
- Location of Mount Orab in Brown County
- Coordinates: 39°01′50″N 83°55′38″W
- Country: United States
- State: Ohio
- County: Brown
- Townships: Green, Pike, Sterling
- Founded: September 3, 1850

Government
  - Mayor: Joe Howser

Area
  - Total: 9.69 sq mi (25.09 km^{2})
  - Land: 9.69 sq mi (25.09 km^{2})
  - Water: 0 sq mi (0.00 km^{2})
- Elevation: 935 ft (285 m)

Population (2020)
  - Total: 4,347
  - Density: 448.8/sq mi (173.28/km^{2})
- Time zone: UTC-5 (Eastern (EST))
  - Summer (DST): UTC-4 (EDT)
- ZIP code: 45154
- Area codes: 937, 326
- FIPS code: 39-52906
- GNIS feature ID: 2399414
- Website: www.mtoraboh.us

Mount Orab (/ˈmaʊnt ˈɔːrəb/ MOUNT OR-əb) is a village in Brown County, Ohio, United States. The population is 4,347 as of the 2020 United States census.

== History ==
Mount Orab was laid out by Daniel Keether on September 3, 1850. The village's name most likely is derived from Mount Horeb, a place in the Hebrew Bible.

== Railroad ==
The Cincinnati, Batavia & Williamsburg Railroad was chartered on January 11, 1876, with the intent to construct a railway between Cincinnati and Williamsburg. On May 16, the eastern terminus of the line was extended to Portsmouth, and the name of the railroad was changed to the Cincinnati & Eastern Railroad (C&E) on May 24.

The C&E itself was acquired by the Norfolk & Western (now Norfolk Southern) in 1901. The Cincinnati Eastern Railroad (CCET) passes through Mount Orab.

== Geography ==
According to the United States Census Bureau, the village has a total area of 8.89 square miles (23.02 km^{2}), all land.

== Demographics ==
Historical population
Census	Pop.	Note	%±
1880	242		—
1890	336		38.8%
1900	561		67.0%
1910	539		−3.9%
1920	545		1.1%
1930	541		−0.7%
1940	589		8.9%
1950	758		28.7%
1960	1,058		39.6%
1970	1,306		23.4%
1980	1,573		20.4%
1990	1,929		22.6%
2000	2,307		19.6%
2010	3,664		58.8%
2020	4,347		18.6%
U.S. Decennial Census

=== 2020 census ===
As of the 2020 census, Mount Orab had a population of 4,347. The median age was 37.2 years. 27.7% of residents were under the age of 18 and 16.9% of residents were 65 years of age or older. For every 100 females there were 86.6 males, and for every 100 females age 18 and over there were 83.7 males age 18 and over.

0.0% of residents lived in urban areas, while 100.0% lived in rural areas.

There were 1,727 households in Mount Orab, of which 36.9% had children under the age of 18 living in them. Of all households, 44.6% were married-couple households, 13.8% were households with a male householder and no spouse or partner present, and 31.8% were households with a female householder and no spouse or partner present. About 28.9% of all households were made up of individuals and 14.7% had someone living alone who was 65 years of age or older.

There were 1,827 housing units, of which 5.5% were vacant. The homeowner vacancy rate was 0.4% and the rental vacancy rate was 5.4%.

Racial composition as of the 2020 census
Race	Number	Percent
White	4,085	94.0%
Black or African American	20	0.5%
American Indian and Alaska Native	7	0.2%
Asian	15	0.3%
Native Hawaiian and Other Pacific Islander	0	0.0%
Some other race	33	0.8%
Two or more races	187	4.3%
Hispanic or Latino (of any race)	78	1.8%

=== 2010 census ===
As of the census of 2010, there were 3,664 people, 1,381 households, and 1,013 families living in the village. The population density was 412.1 inhabitants per square mile (159.1/km^{2}). There were 1,473 housing units at an average density of 165.7 per square mile (64.0/km^{2}). The racial makeup of the village was 97.7% White, 0.7% African American, 0.1% Native American, 0.6% Asian, 0.2% from other races, and 0.7% from two or more races. Hispanic or Latino of any race were 0.6% of the population.

There were 1,381 households, of which 41.2% had children under the age of 18 living with them, 50.8% were married couples living together, 17.2% had a female householder with no husband present, 5.4% had a male householder with no wife present, and 26.6% were non-families. 22.8% of all households were made up of individuals, and 8.6% had someone living alone who was 65 years of age or older. The average household size was 2.64 and the average family size was 3.08.

The median age in the village was 33.7 years. 29.7% of residents were under the age of 18; 8.3% were between the ages of 18 and 24; 27.9% were from 25 to 44; 22.7% were from 45 to 64; and 11.6% were 65 years of age or older. The gender makeup of the village was 47.7% male and 52.3% female.

=== 2000 census ===
As of the census of 2000, there were 2,307 people, 879 households, and 639 families living in the village. The population density was 607.7 inhabitants per square mile (234.6/km^{2}). There were 932 housing units at an average density of 245.5 per square mile (94.8/km^{2}). The racial makeup of the village was 99.22% White, 0.13% African American, 0.22% Native American, 0.04% Asian, and 0.39% from two or more races. Hispanic or Latino of any race were 0.22% of the population.

There were 879 households, out of which 40.6% had children under the age of 18 living with them, 51.5% were married couples living together, 16.6% had a female householder with no husband present, and 27.3% were non-families. 23.4% of all households were made up of individuals, and 11.1% had someone living alone who was 65 years of age or older. The average household size was 2.61 and the average family size was 3.05.

In the village, the population was spread out, with 30.8% under the age of 18, 9.8% from 18 to 24, 30.6% from 25 to 44, 17.5% from 45 to 64, and 11.3% who were 65 years of age or older. The median age was 30 years. For every 100 females there were 86.7 males. For every 100 females age 18 and over, there were 80.5 males.

The median income for a household in the village was $33,798, and the median income for a family was $42,938. Males had a median income of $33,672 versus $21,339 for females. The per capita income for the town was $16,483. About 12.5% of families and 14.6% of the population were below the poverty line, including 20.2% of those under age 18 and 8.7% of those age 65 or over.

== Education ==
The village contains four public schools, Mount Orab Elementary School, Mount Orab Middle School, Western Brown High School and Southern State Community College. Mount Orab has a public library, a branch of the Brown County Public Library.

== In the media ==
Mount Orab was formerly home to the Lake Drive-In movie theater, which was destroyed by a storm in the late 1980s. After the theater was shut down, the management posted "Gone with the Wind" on the marquee, a punning reference to the storm. A local newspaper printed a picture of the marquee prompting rumors that a tornado had taken the theater out during a re-release of Gone with the Wind.

== Gallery ==
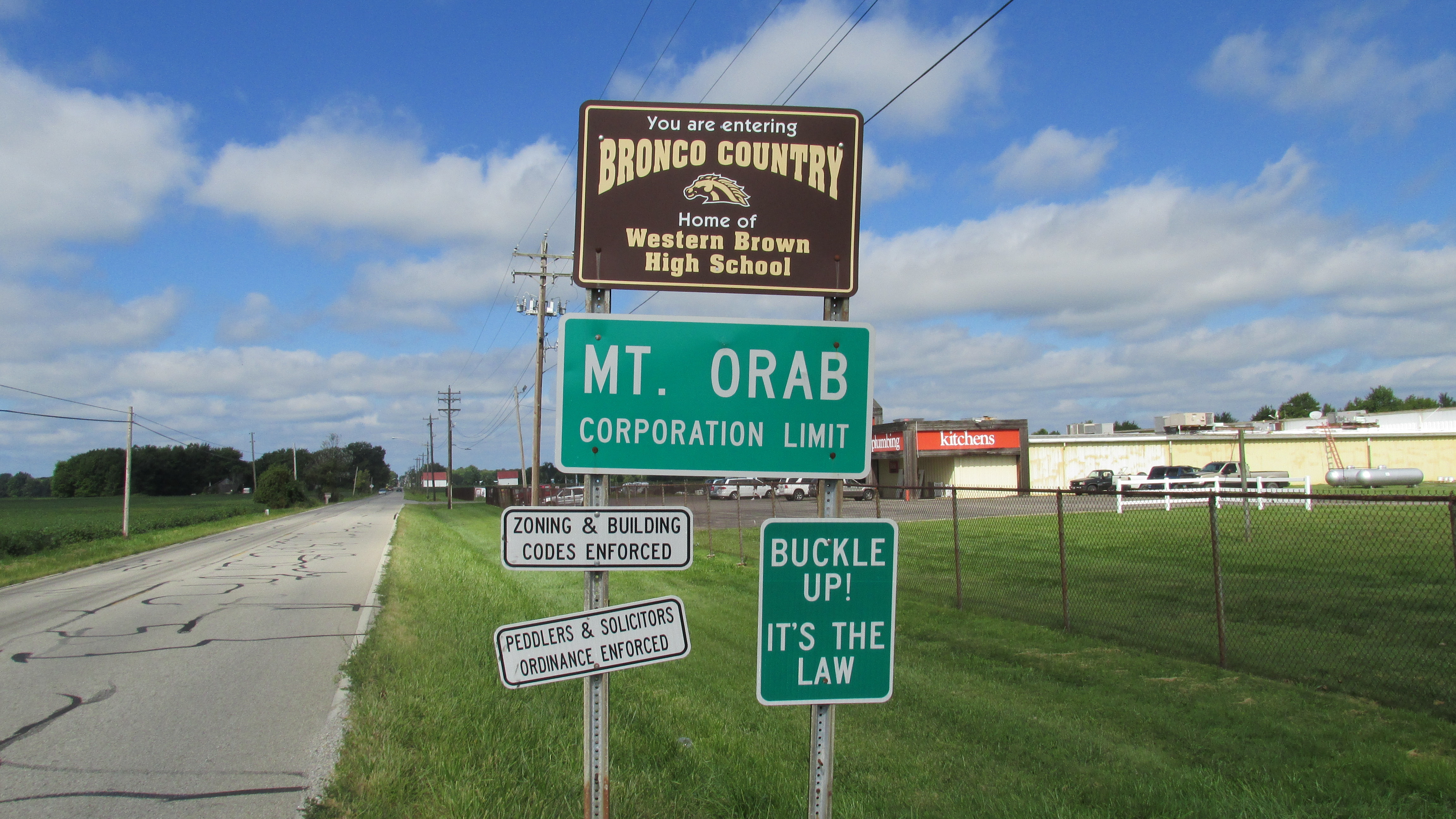
Mt. Orab corporation limit sign

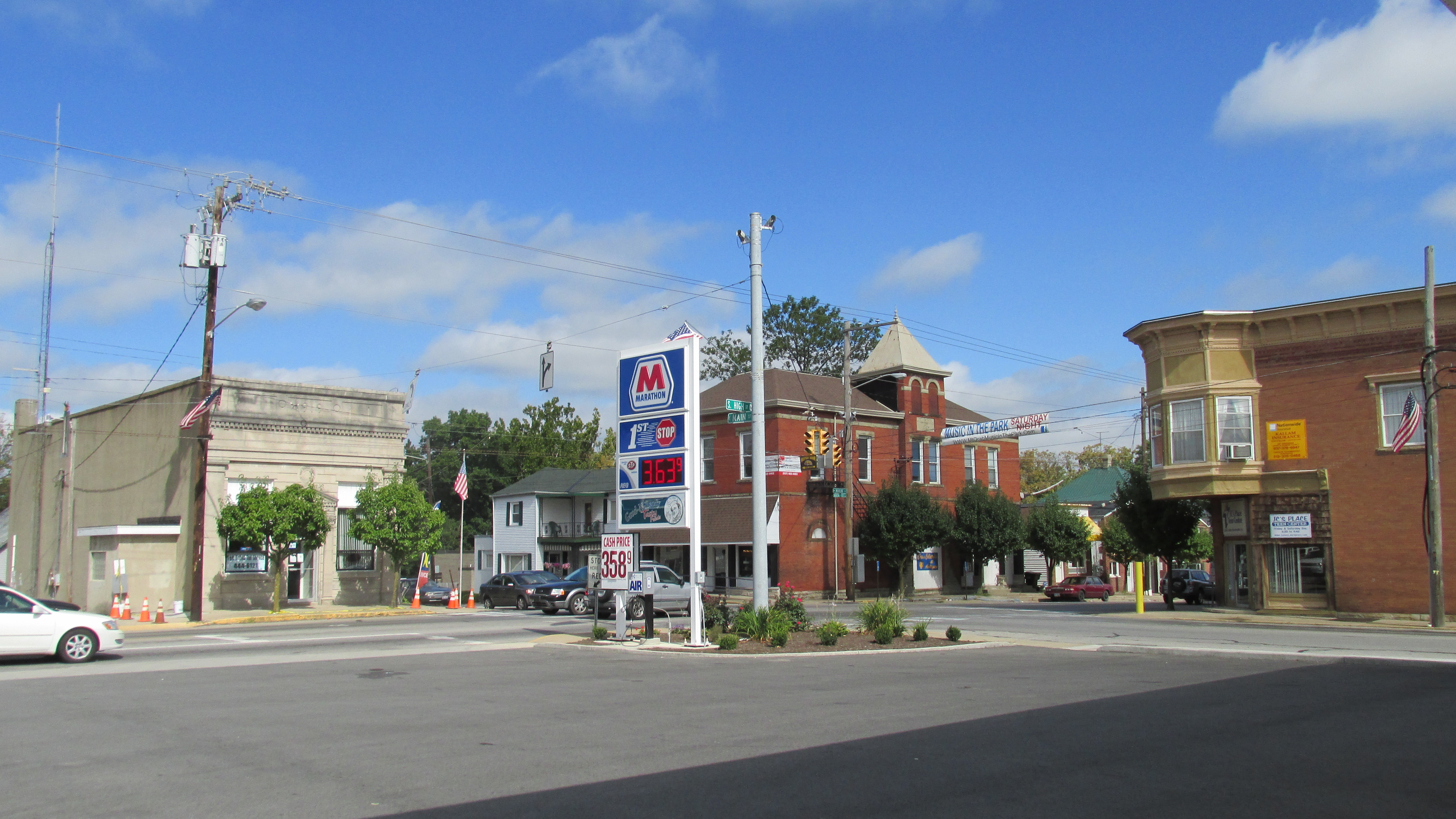
Looking northwest at the intersection of Tri-County Highway (Old Ohio Highway 32) and High Street (U.S. Route 68) in Mt. Orab

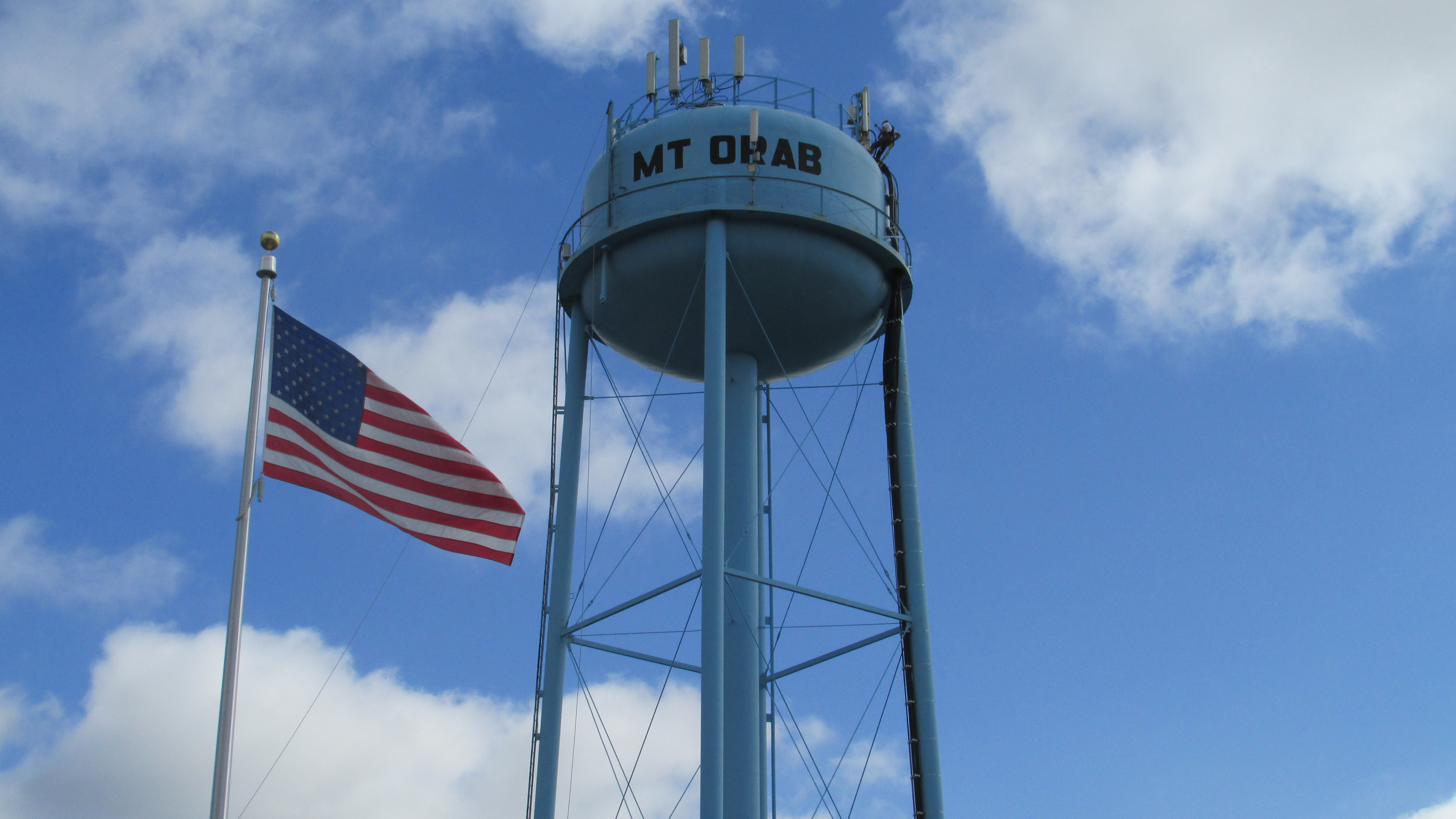
Water tower in Mt. Orab
