= Clay Township, Highland County, Ohio =

Township in Ohio, US

- Township
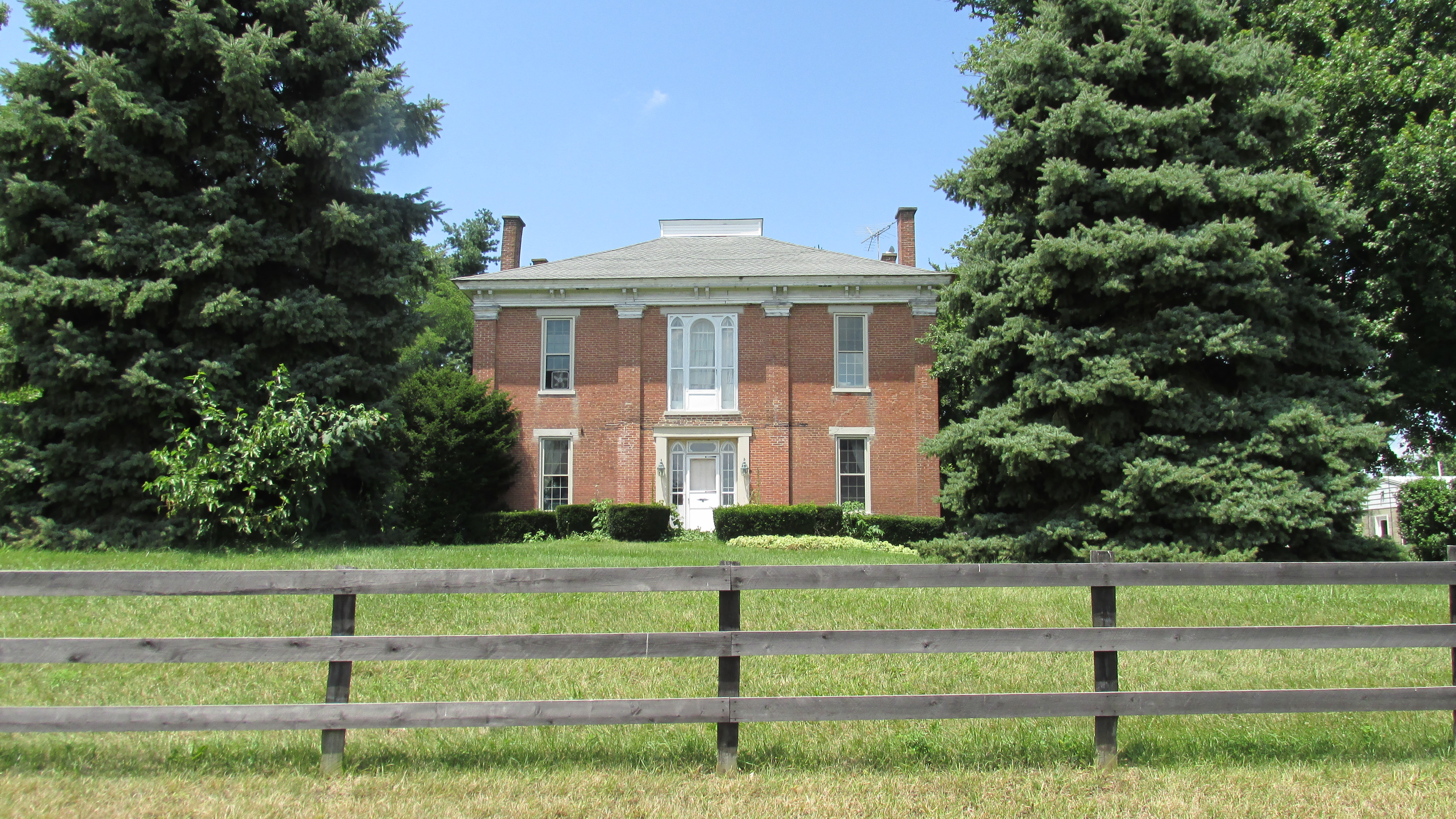
- The Hirons-Brown House, a historic site in the township

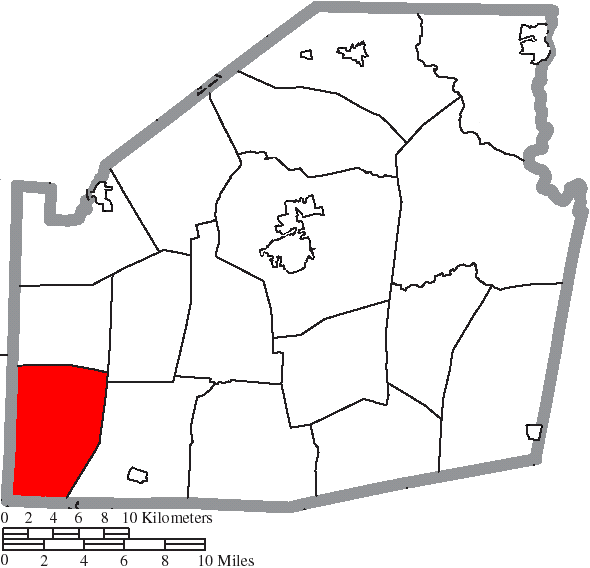
- Location of Clay Township in Highland County
- Coordinates: 39°4′25″N 83°50′28″W
- Country: United States
- State: Ohio
- County: Highland

Area
  - Total: 28.11 sq mi (72.81 km^{2})
  - Land: 28.10 sq mi (72.79 km^{2})
  - Water: 0.0077 sq mi (0.02 km^{2})
- Elevation: 948 ft (289 m)

Population (2020)
  - Total: 1,499
  - Density: 53.34/sq mi (20.59/km^{2})
- Time zone: UTC-5 (Eastern (EST))
  - Summer (DST): UTC-4 (EDT)
- FIPS code: 39-15476
- GNIS feature ID: 1086300

Clay Township is one of the seventeen townships of Highland County, Ohio, United States. As of the 2020 census the population was 1,499.

== Geography ==
Located in the southwestern corner of the county, it borders the following townships:

- Salem Township - north
- Hamer Township - northeast
- Whiteoak Township - east
- Washington Township, Brown County - south
- Pike Township, Brown County - southwest corner
- Green Township, Brown County - west

No municipalities are located in Clay Township, although the census-designated place of Buford lies in the center of the township.

== Name and history ==
It is one of nine Clay Townships statewide.

== Government ==
The township is governed by a three-member board of trustees, who are elected in November of odd-numbered years to a four-year term beginning on the following January 1. Two are elected in the year after the presidential election and one is elected in the year before it. There is also an elected township fiscal officer, who serves a four-year term beginning on April 1 of the year after the election, which is held in November of the year before the presidential election. Vacancies in the fiscal officership or on the board of trustees are filled by the remaining trustees.
