= Green Township, Brown County, Ohio =

Township in Ohio, US

- Township
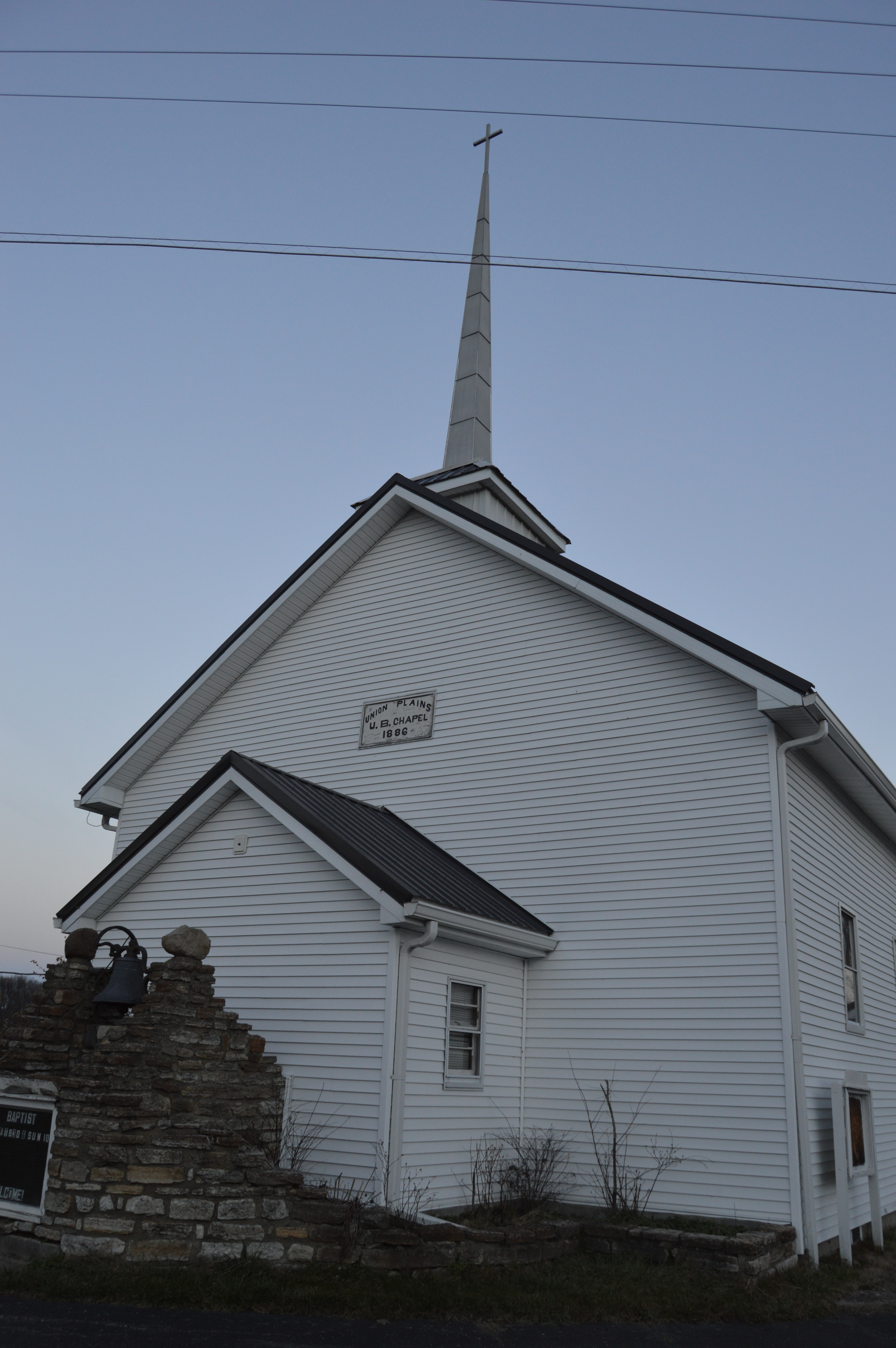
- Union Plains United Baptist Church at Greenbush

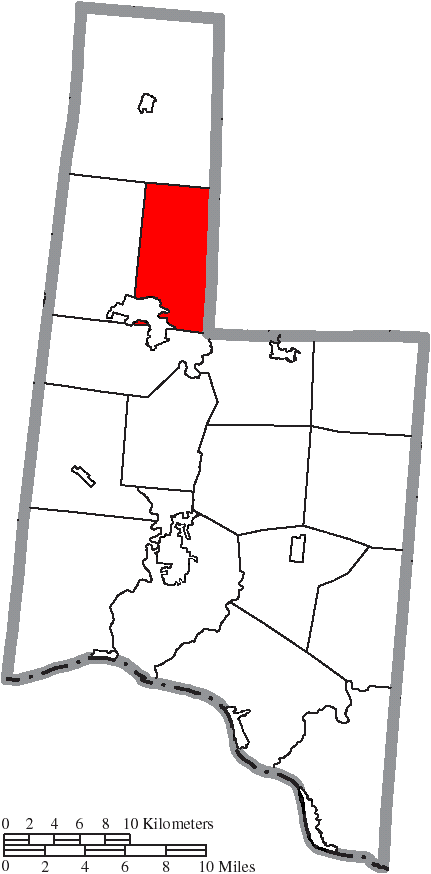
- Location of Green Township in Brown County
- Coordinates: 39°3′36″N 83°55′3″W
- Country: United States
- State: Ohio
- County: Brown

Area
  - Total: 25.8 sq mi (66.9 km^{2})
  - Land: 25.8 sq mi (66.9 km^{2})
  - Water: 0 sq mi (0.0 km^{2})
- Elevation: 942 ft (287 m)

Population (2020)
  - Total: 3,632
  - Density: 141/sq mi (54.3/km^{2})
- Time zone: UTC-5 (Eastern (EST))
  - Summer (DST): UTC-4 (EDT)
- FIPS code: 39-31696
- GNIS feature ID: 1085796

Green Township is one of the sixteen townships of Brown County, Ohio, United States. The 2020 census found 3,632 people in the township.

== Geography ==
Located in the northern extension of the county, it borders the following townships:

- Perry Township - north
- Salem Township, Highland County - northeast
- Clay Township, Highland County - east
- Washington Township - southeast corner
- Pike Township - south
- Sterling Township - west

Part of the village of Mount Orab is located in southwestern Green Township.

== Name and history ==
Green Township was established in 1834. It is named from a thicket of green bushes near the home of a pioneer settler.

It is one of sixteen Green Townships statewide.

== Government ==
The township is governed by a three-member board of trustees, who are elected in November of odd-numbered years to a four-year term beginning on the following January 1. Two are elected in the year after the presidential election and one is elected in the year before it. There is also an elected township fiscal officer, who serves a four-year term beginning on April 1 of the year after the election, which is held in November of the year before the presidential election. Vacancies in the fiscal officership or on the board of trustees are filled by the remaining trustees.
