= Jackson Township, Clermont County, Ohio =

Township in Ohio, US

- Township
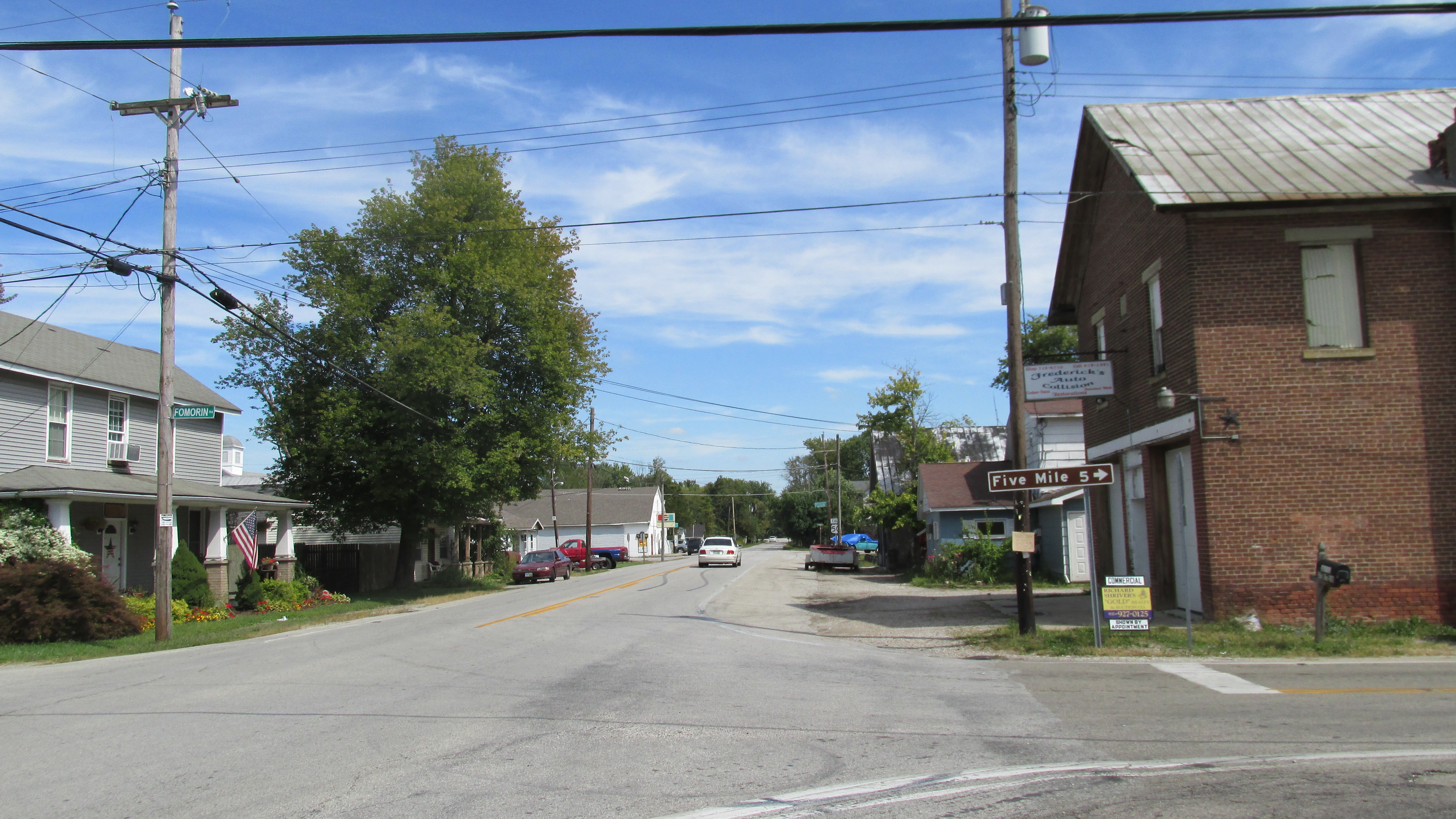
- U.S. Route 50 in Marathon

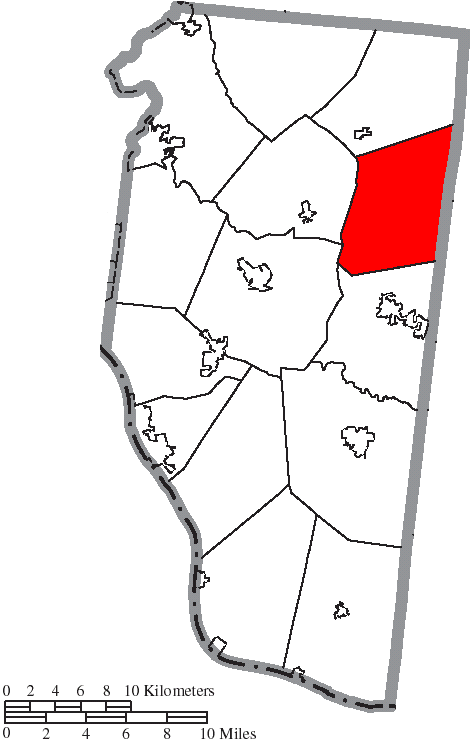
- Location of Jackson Township in Clermont County
- Coordinates: 39°7′58″N 84°2′24″W
- Country: United States
- State: Ohio
- County: Clermont

Area
  - Total: 31.4 sq mi (81.2 km^{2})
  - Land: 31.2 sq mi (80.7 km^{2})
  - Water: 0.19 sq mi (0.5 km^{2})
- Elevation: 909 ft (277 m)

Population (2020)
  - Total: 3,089
  - Density: 96/sq mi (36.9/km^{2})
- Time zone: UTC-5 (Eastern (EST))
  - Summer (DST): UTC-4 (EDT)
- FIPS code: 39-37716
- GNIS feature ID: 1085864

Jackson Township is one of the fourteen townships of Clermont County, Ohio, United States. The population was 3,089 at the 2020 census.

== Geography ==
Located in the northeastern part of the county, it borders the following townships:

- Wayne Township - north
- Perry Township, Brown County - northeast
- Sterling Township, Brown County - southeast
- Williamsburg Township - south
- Batavia Township - southwest
- Stonelick Township - west

No municipalities are located in Jackson Township. The census-designated place of Marathon lies in the township's east.

== Name and history ==
It is one of thirty-seven Jackson Townships statewide.

The small community of Lerado was laid out by Bernard Conn in April 1834 as "Brownsville" on the "Newtonsville and Brownsville free turnpike", now State Route 131. At one time the village had a hotel, a general store, two blacksmith shops and a turning lathe shop. A post office was established there in 1876. It was thought, at one time, that Brownsville would become a sizable town with considerable population and many businesses.

== Government ==
The township is governed by a three-member board of trustees, who are elected in November of odd-numbered years to a four-year term beginning on the following January 1. Two are elected in the year after the presidential election and one is elected in the year before it. There is also an elected township fiscal officer, who serves a four-year term beginning on April 1 of the year after the election, which is held in November of the year before the presidential election. Vacancies in the fiscal officership or on the board of trustees are filled by the remaining trustees.
