= Amelia, Ohio =

- Census-designated place
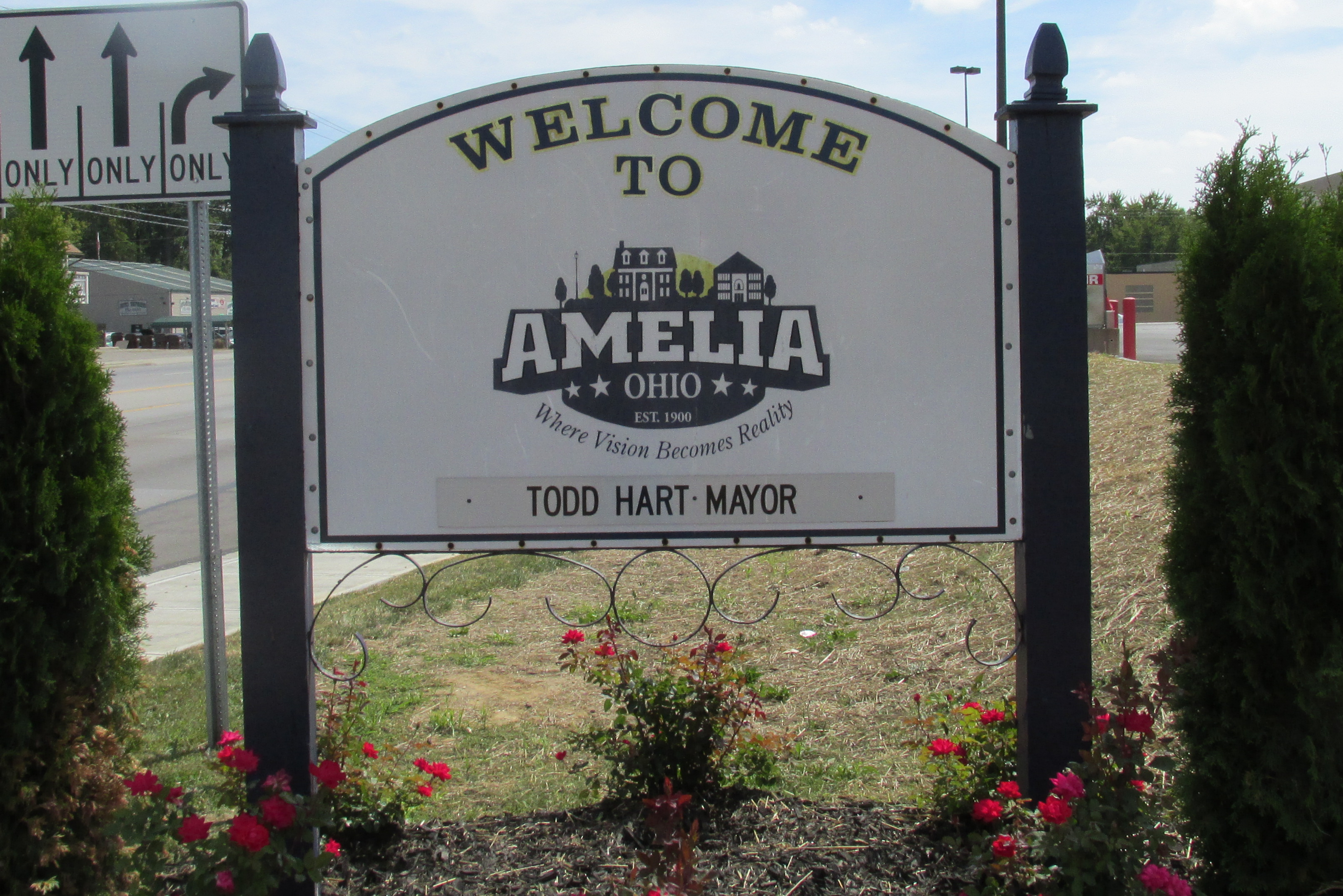
- The Amelia welcome sign, removed in 2019.
- Motto: Where Vision Becomes Reality
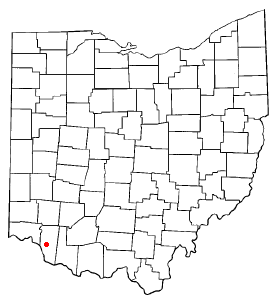
- Location of Amelia, Ohio

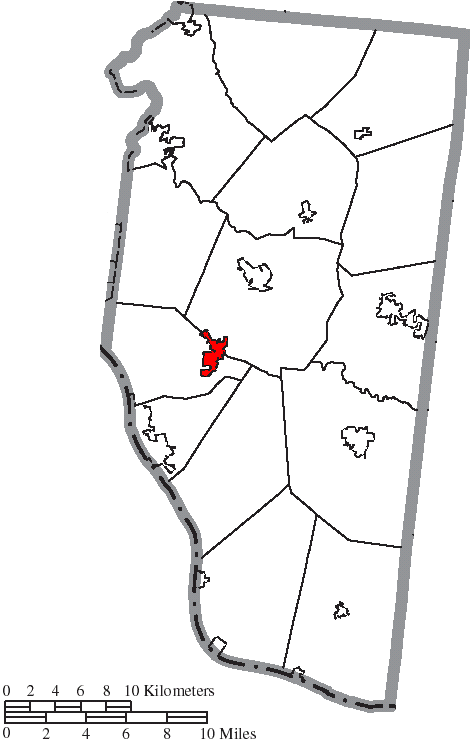
- Location of Amelia in Clermont County
- Coordinates: 39°01′37″N 84°13′19″W
- Country: United States
- State: Ohio
- County: Clermont
- Incorporated: December 20, 1900
- Dissolved: November 25, 2019

Government
  - Mayor-elect: Renee Gerber

Area
  - Total: 5.55 sq mi (14.38 km^{2})
  - Land: 5.53 sq mi (14.33 km^{2})
  - Water: 0.019 sq mi (0.05 km^{2})
- Elevation: 889 ft (271 m)

Population (2020)
  - Total: 12,575
  - Density: 2,272.1/sq mi (877.26/km^{2})
- Demonym: Amelian
- Time zone: UTC-5 (Eastern (EST))
  - Summer (DST): UTC-4 (EDT)
- ZIP code: 45102
- Area code: 513
- FIPS code: 39-01742
- GNIS feature ID: 2805373
- Website: www.ameliavillage.com

Amelia is a census-designated place (CDP) and former village in Pierce and Batavia townships in Clermont County, Ohio, United States. The population was 12,575 at the 2020 census. Amelia incorporated in 1900, but in November 2019, residents voted to dissolve the village over the imposition of a local income tax. Amelia is the most populous village in state history to be dissolved and the first to be partitioned between two townships. The Amelia CDP was created by the United States Census Bureau in 2020 and covers an area slightly larger than the previous village boundaries.

== History ==
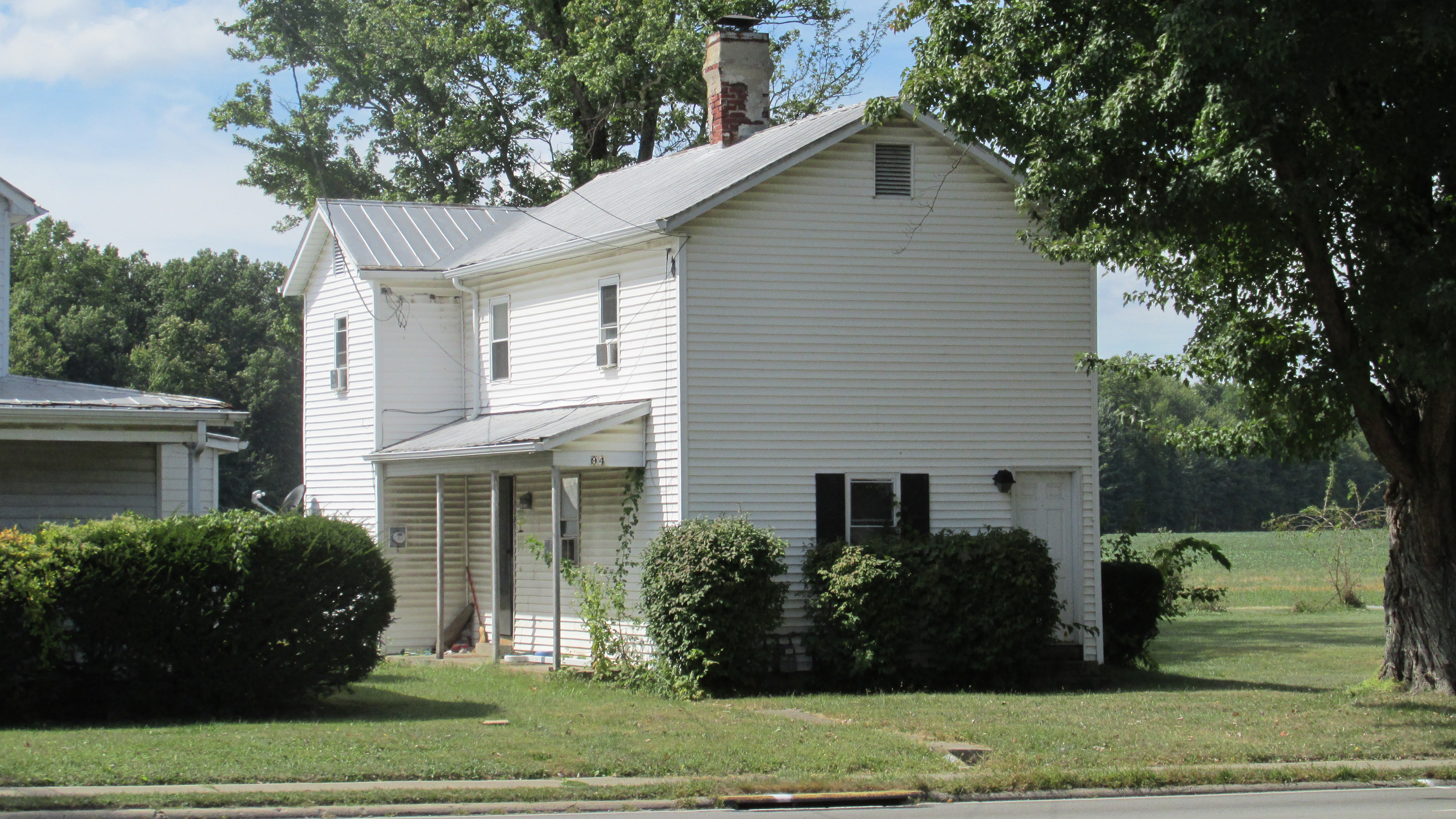
Amelia Bowdoin House

Amelia was not officially platted. The area was originally called Milltown, later shortened to Milton. However, when a post office was established in 1836, there was already a Milton Post Office in the state. Various accounts state that the post office was named Amelia after Amelia Bowdoin, a well known and popular tollkeeper on the Ohio Turnpike (present-day State Route 125). Her home is now known as the Amelia Bowdoin House and stands at 94 West Main Street, across the street from its original location. However, there is no census record of an Amelia Bowdoin; Amelia may have been a corruption of the name of Armilla Bodin, the wife of a tollkeeper. Amelia was incorporated as a village on December 20, 1900.

Amelia's population rose from 4,801 in the 2010 census to an estimated 5,009 in 2018. Under state law, the village would have been required to become a city after it posted a population over 5,000 in the 2020 census. In preparation for becoming a city, it adopted a charter in November 2017, though the change in status was not reflected in the Ohio Secretary of State's roster of municipalities. Among other changes, becoming a city would have protected Amelia from dissolution.

=== Dissolution ===
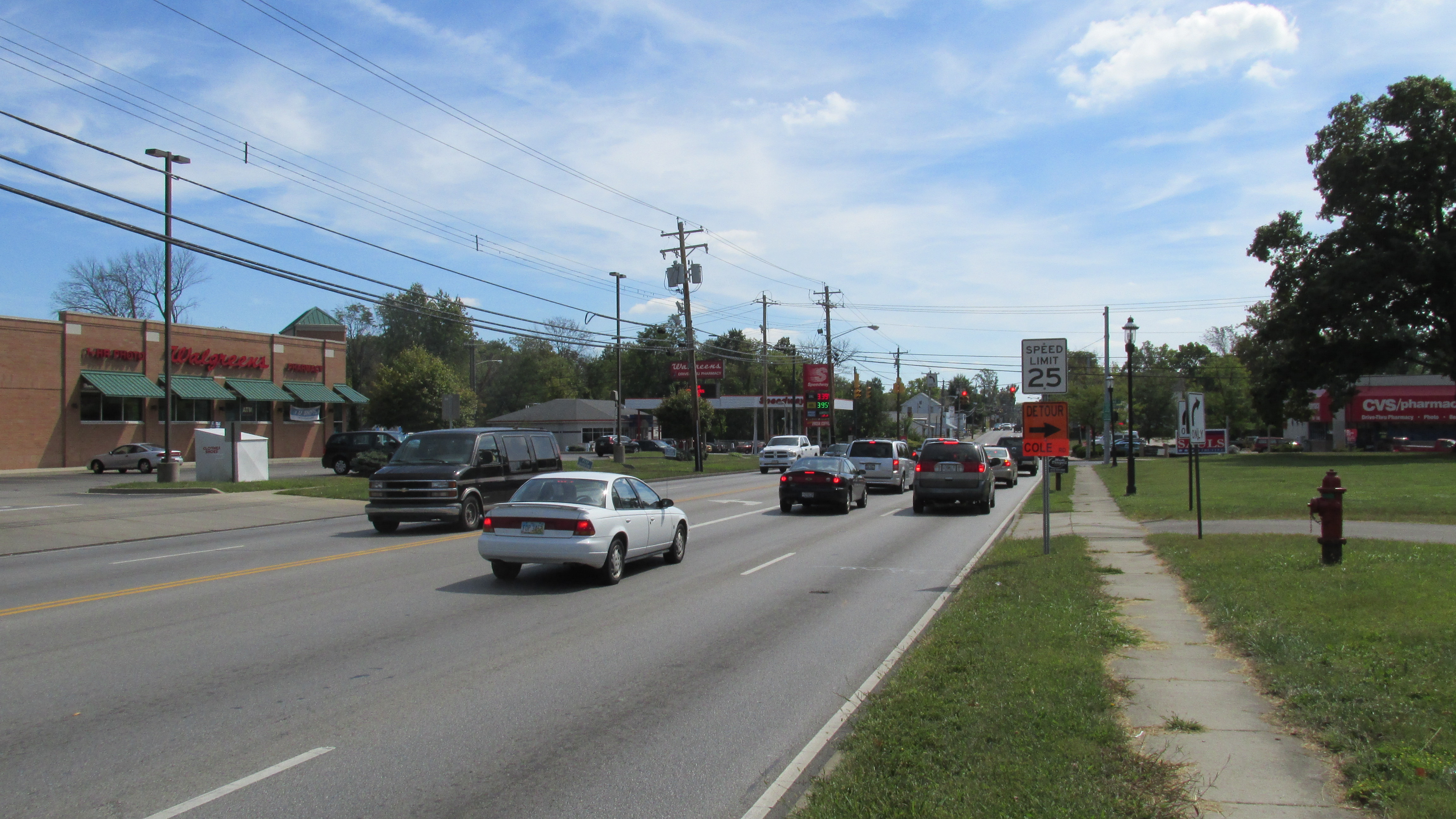
Eastbound State Route 125 (Main Street) in Amelia

In 2008, Amelia Village Council proposed a one-percent income tax to cover maintenance of Ohio State Route 125 within the village. In response to the proposal, Amelia Residents for Fiscal Responsibility gathered a petition to dissolve the village into Pierce and Batavia townships. The Clermont County Board of Elections initially rejected the petition after invalidating many of the signatures, but the group succeeded in adding the initiative to a May 5, 2009, special election. Amelia survived the election by a margin of 865 to 401.

On February 5, 2018, the council unanimously adopted the proposed one-percent income tax in an emergency ordinance, without the usual three readings, to meet a deadline imposed by the Regional Income Tax Authority. The tax went into effect on July 1, 2018, making Amelia the last village in Clermont County to impose an income tax after cuts to the state's local government fund and one of more than 600 cities and villages in Ohio that tax income. Former councilmember Renee Gerber subsequently led a petition drive for dissolution. A June 29 council meeting became heated over the tax and dissolution campaign.

On November 5, 2019, residents voted to dissolve the village by a margin of 843 to 479. Amelia was split between Pierce and Batavia townships along State Route 125. Newtonsville residents voted for dissolution the same day. Dissolution took effect at 10:00 AM on November 25, 2019, when the election results were certified. Gerber was elected to serve as the village's final mayor during a yearlong transition period under the oversight of the Ohio State Auditor, but upon the auditor's advice, Hart was retained to carry out the village's remaining administrative responsibilities. Amelia residents will continue to pay the one-percent income tax until at least $3 million in debt is paid off. Amelia was by far the most populous village in state history to be dissolved and the first to be partitioned between two townships.

== Geography ==
According to the United States Census Bureau, the village had a total area of 1.79 square miles (4.64 km^{2}), all land.

== Demographics ==
Historical population
Census	Pop.	Note	%±
1880	185		—
1910	417		—
1920	658		57.8%
1930	427		−35.1%
1940	550		28.8%
1950	601		9.3%
1960	913		51.9%
1970	820		−10.2%
1980	1,108		35.1%
1990	1,837		65.8%
2000	2,752		49.8%
2010	4,801		74.5%
2020	12,575		161.9%
U.S. Decennial Census

=== 2020 census ===
As of the 2020 census, Amelia had a population of 12,575. The median age was 36.5 years. 25.1% of residents were under the age of 18 and 13.5% of residents were 65 years of age or older. For every 100 females there were 95.2 males, and for every 100 females age 18 and over there were 93.4 males age 18 and over.

99.8% of residents lived in urban areas, while 0.2% lived in rural areas.

There were 5,012 households in Amelia, of which 33.9% had children under the age of 18 living in them. Of all households, 47.1% were married-couple households, 17.2% were households with a male householder and no spouse or partner present, and 26.0% were households with a female householder and no spouse or partner present. About 27.3% of all households were made up of individuals and 10.7% had someone living alone who was 65 years of age or older.

There were 5,249 housing units, of which 4.5% were vacant. The homeowner vacancy rate was 0.7% and the rental vacancy rate was 6.7%.

Racial composition as of the 2020 census
Race	Number	Percent
White	11,296	89.8%
Black or African American	239	1.9%
American Indian and Alaska Native	35	0.3%
Asian	116	0.9%
Native Hawaiian and Other Pacific Islander	2	0.0%
Some other race	112	0.9%
Two or more races	775	6.2%
Hispanic or Latino (of any race)	325	2.6%

=== 2010 census ===
As of the census of 2010, there were 4,801 people, 1,830 households, and 1,238 families living in the village. The population density was 2,682.1 inhabitants per square mile (1,035.6/km^{2}). There were 1,974 housing units at an average density of 1,102.8 per square mile (425.8/km^{2}). The racial makeup of the village was 95.1% White, 1.6% African American, 0.3% Native American, 0.7% Asian, 0.6% from other races, and 1.6% from two or more races. Hispanic or Latino of any race were 1.9% of the population.

There were 1,830 households, of which 41.5% had children under the age of 18 living with them, 49.2% were married couples living together, 13.3% had a female householder with no husband present, 5.1% had a male householder with no wife present, and 32.3% were non-families. 26.0% of all households were made up of individuals, and 7.2% had someone living alone who was 65 years of age or older. The average household size was 2.62 and the average family size was 3.15.

The median age in the village was 30.5 years. 29.7% of residents were under the age of 18; 8.3% were between the ages of 18 and 24; 36.6% were from 25 to 44; 19.7% were from 45 to 64; and 5.9% were 65 years of age or older. The gender makeup of the village was 48.5% male and 51.5% female.

=== 2000 census ===
As of the census of 2000, there were 2,752 people, 1,063 households, and 738 families living in the village. The population density was 2,007.2 inhabitants per square mile (775.0/km^{2}). There were 1,112 housing units at an average density of 811.1 per square mile (313.2/km^{2}). The racial makeup of the village was 96.77% White, 0.58% African American, 0.07% Native American, 0.29% Asian, 0.73% from other races, and 1.56% from two or more races. Hispanic or Latino of any race were 1.27% of the population.

There were 1,063 households, out of which 41.1% had children under the age of 18 living with them, 53.0% were married couples living together, 12.0% had a female householder with no husband present, and 30.5% were non-families. 24.8% of all households were made up of individuals, and 10.3% had someone living alone who was 65 years of age or older. The average household size was 2.59 and the average family size was 3.10.

In the village, the population was spread out, with 28.5% under the age of 18, 10.6% from 18 to 24, 39.3% from 25 to 44, 13.9% from 45 to 64, and 7.6% who were 65 years of age or older. The median age was 29 years. For every 100 females there were 89.0 males. For every 100 females age 18 and over, there were 86.9 males.

The median income for a household in the village was $44,900, and the median income for a family was $51,699. Males had a median income of $37,500 versus $26,295 for females. The per capita income for the village was $17,772. About 5.0% of families and 7.6% of the population were below the poverty line, including 5.7% of those under age 18 and 14.1% of those age 65 or over.

== Education ==
The CDP is in the West Clermont Local School District. West Clermont High School is the public comprehensive high school.

Amelia has a public library, a branch of the Clermont County Public Library.

== Notable person ==
- David Taylor – U.S. representative
