= East Fork State Park =

Park in Ohio, USA

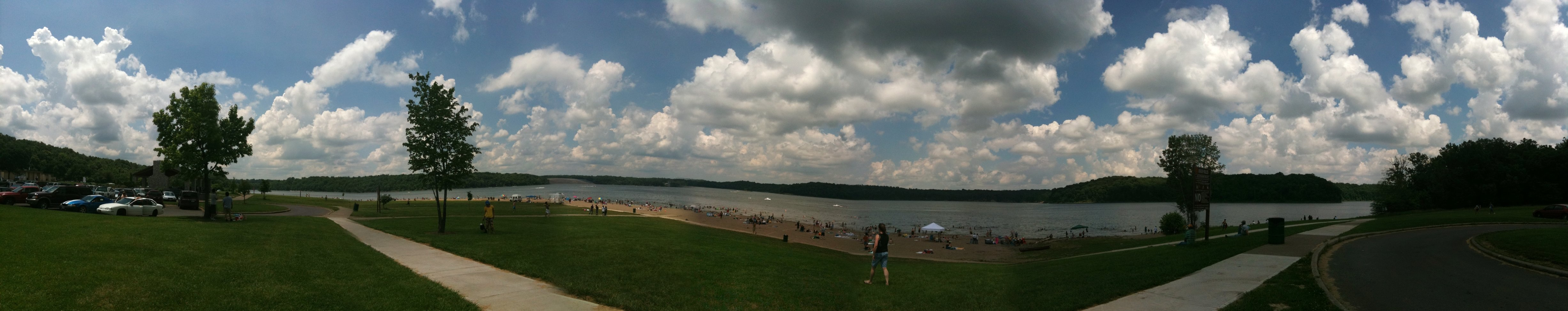

- Location within Ohio Location within the United States
- Location: Clermont County, Ohio, United States
- Coordinates: 39°01′48″N 84°06′15″W
- Area: 4,870 acres (1,970 ha)
- Elevation: 823 ft (251 m)
- Established: 1978
- Administrator: Ohio Department of Natural Resources
- Designation: Ohio state park
- Website: East Fork State Park

East Fork State Park is 4,870-acre (1,970 ha) public recreation area located around the East Fork of the Little Miami River in Clermont County, twenty miles (32 km) southeast of central Cincinnati, Ohio, in the United States. It maintains the 33-mile "Steve Newman World-Walker" perimeter trail, camping, hiking, swimming, and boating opportunities. The state park has hosted junior and collegiate rowing races, including the US Rowing Youth National Championships. The park's main feature is William H. Harsha Lake, a 2,107-acre (853 ha) reservoir created in 1978. The lake's large earthen dam and smaller saddle dams are operated by the U.S. Army Corps of Engineers.

Fish found in the lake include largemouth bass, smallmouth bass, Kentucky spotted bass, bluegill, white crappie, black crappie, channel catfish, flathead catfish, bigmouth buffalofish, carp, and hybrid striped bass.
