= Stonelick =

Stonelick may refer to:

- Stonelick Covered Bridge, in Clermont County, Ohio
- Stonelick State Park, in Clermont County, Ohio
- Stonelick, Ohio, an unincorporated community
- Stonelick Township, Clermont County, Ohio
