= Ohio State Route 727 =

State highway in Clermont County, Ohio, US

State Route 727

Route information
- Maintained by ODOT
- Length: 5.46 mi (8.79 km)
- Existed: 1937–present

Major junctions
- South end: SR 131 near Newtonsville
- North end: SR 133 near Blanchester

Location
- Country: United States
- State: Ohio
- Counties: Clermont

Highway system
- Ohio State Highway System; Interstate; US; State; Scenic
← SR 726	→ SR 728

State Route 727 (SR 727) is a north–south state highway located in the southwestern portion of the U.S. state of Ohio. SR 727 has its southern terminus at a T-intersection with SR 131 approximately 1.50 miles (2.41 km) west of Newtonsville. The highway's northern terminus is at a T-intersection with SR 133 nearly 5.25 miles (8.45 km) southwest of Blanchester in the unincorporated community of Edenton. The route provides access to Stonelick State Park.

== Route description ==
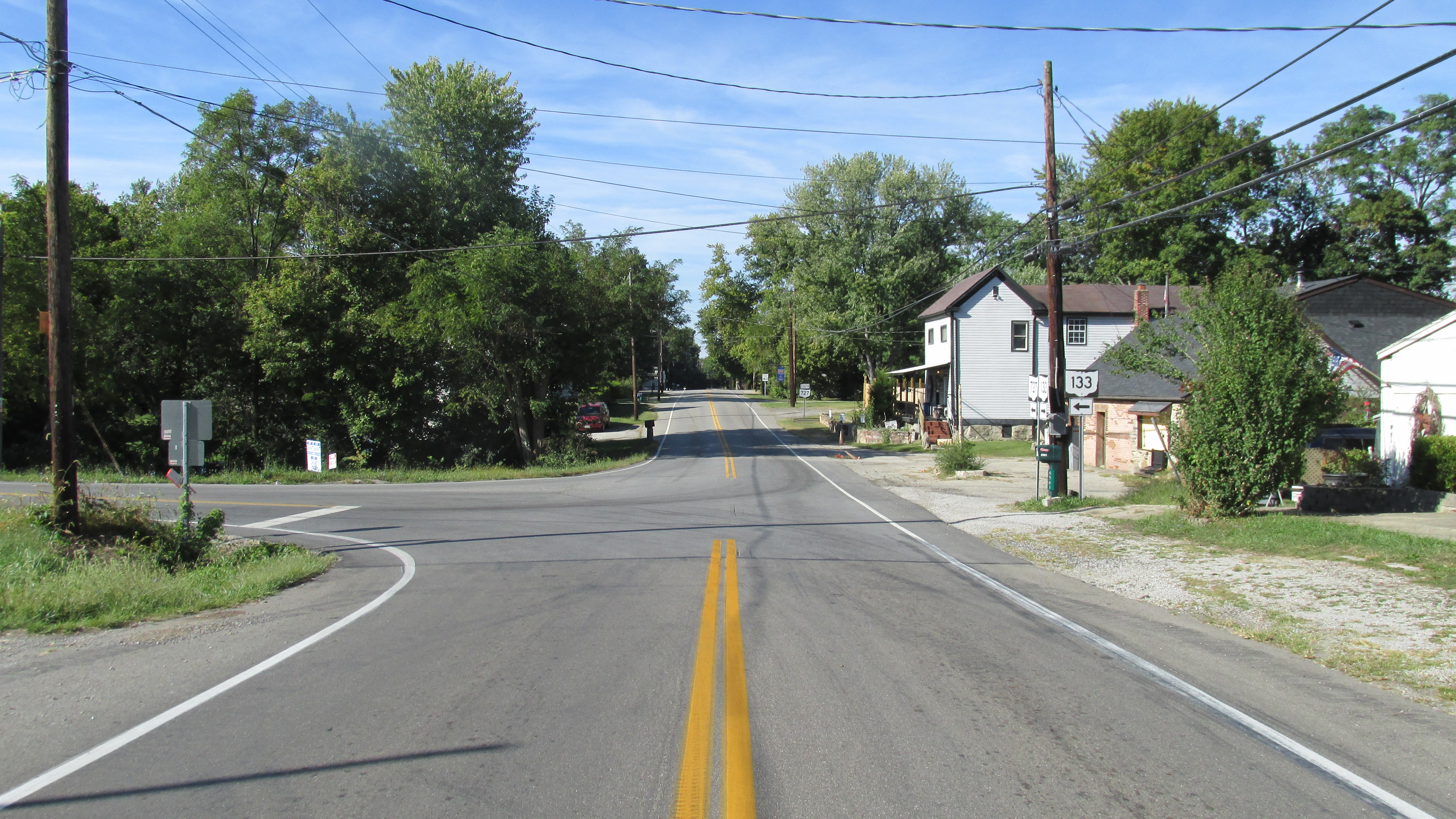
Northern terminus of SR 727 in Edenton looking southwest

All of SR 727 is nestled within the northeastern corner of Clermont County and follows the course of the Stonelick Creek for its entire length. SR 727 begins at an intersection with SR 131 in Stonelick Township and heads northeast. Almost immediately, it enters Wayne Township where it remains for the remainder of the route. The route passes through Modest, and continues northeast through a mix of residential areas, farmlands, and forested areas until it curves sharply to the northwest at the border of Stonelick State Park. SR 727 passes two park access roads before it crosses over the creek in front of the dam impounding Stonelick Lake. The route then curves back to the northeast curving around the lake along the way. Here, the park is on the southern side of the road while residences line the north side. Upon reaching the unincorporated community of Edenton, SR 727 ends at an intersection with SR 133. The route is not included as a component of the National Highway System, a network of routes determined to be the most important for the economy, mobility and defense of the nation.

== History ==
SR 727 was established in 1937. It has generally maintained the same northeastern Clermont County routing between SR 131 and SR 133 from its inception to the present day. The only change in the routing occurred in 1950 when the creation of Stonelick Lake forced the almost-straight route to be rerouted around the north side of the lake.

== Major intersections ==
The entire route is in Clermont County.

Location	mi	km	Destinations	Notes
Stonelick Township	0.00	0.00	SR 131	
Wayne Township	5.46	8.79	SR 133	
1.000 mi = 1.609 km; 1.000 km = 0.621 mi
