= H. Anna Quinby =

American lawyer, magazine editor, and business manager

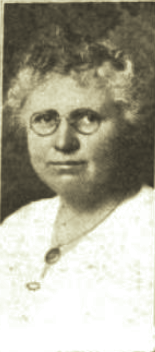
H. Anna Quinby (1921)

H. Anna Quinby (July 8, 1871 – October 28, 1931) was an American lawyer, magazine editor, and business manager. As a social reformer, she advocated for women's suffrage and was active in the temperance movement. She was the first woman from Ohio admitted to practice law before the Supreme Court of the United States. She was also the first woman to apply for the position of notary public, from which women were always excluded before the enactment of the amendment to the Ohio constitution providing for female suffrage. Lastly, she was the first woman in Ohio to raise a litter of pigs to a ton of pork in 180 days and so qualified for membership in the Ohio Ton-Litter Club.

== Early life and education ==
Hannah Anna ("H. Anna") Quinby was born in Edenton, Ohio, July 8, 1871. Her parents were Thomas M. (1828-1903) and Eliza (Cramer) Quinby (1833-1918). Hannah had several siblings including: Franklin, Alfred, Mary, Ephraim, Josephine, Nancy, Arthur, Stephen, Calvin, and Edward.

She graduated from the State Normal University at Lebanon, Ohio with the degree of B.S. in 1896. She did graduate studies ata the University of Michigan in 1897–98. In 1909, she received the degree of LL.B. from Ohio State University in 1909.

== Career ==
After graduation from the normal university, she taught elocution, oratory, and civics in LeMars (Iowa) College. Later, she was a professor of elocution and oratory in Dennison (Ohio) College (now Denison University).

In the fall of 1908, she acted as attorney for the prosecution in a larceny case at Edenton, Ohio in which Ella Purcell, another woman lawyer, appeared for the defense. This was the first case in Ohio in which both attorneys were women. These two, the following year, organized the Ohio association of women lawyers. In 1909, having earned her law degree, Quinby formed a partnership with Purcell. Later, Quinby was the first Ohio woman lawyer admitted to practice before the Supreme Court of the U.S.

In 1908, Quinby was secretary of the Ohio state Loyal Temperance Legion. For ten years, she was a lecturer and organizer of the Ohio Woman's Christian Temperance Union (W.C.T.U.).

Quinby lectured in every county of Ohio on woman suffrage. She secured 36,000 signatures to the Ohio enrollment of men and women who believe in woman suffrage. The Ohio Woman was the name of the weekly publication published in Columbus, Ohio that was devoted to matters of interest to women throughout the state, and at the time, it was the only woman suffrage paper in Ohio owned and controlled by women. Quinby was the company president and the paper's editor-in-chief. The Ohio Woman Publishing Company was incorporated in Columbus and capitalized at US$5,000. Other alumni and students from the University of Michigan who were associated with the publication included Sarah C. Swaney, business manager, and Alice Bower, circulation manager. A department of the magazine was entitled "As College Girls See It", a series of articles written by undergraduates on the campus.

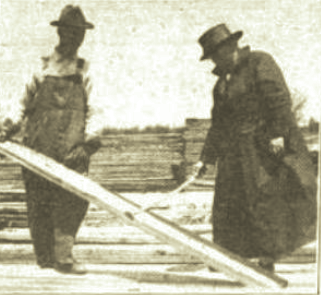
H. Anna Quinby tallying hardwood lumber (1921)

Under the name of H. A. Quinby Lumber Co., Quinby became a wholesaler, with offices in the New First National Bank Building, Columbus, Ohio. In Ohio, she had the distinction of being one of the first woman wholesalers in the lumber business as well as one of the first women to operate a mill. Quinby became a wholesale lumber dealer by force of circumstances. She was an heir to a 200 acres (81 ha) farm near Blanchester, Ohio, in Clermont County, and at the death of her mother, purchased the interests of other heirs, becoming sole owner. This farm contained approximately 100 acres (40 ha) of excellent hardwoods, mostly oak, hickory, and walnut. Quinby saw the value of this woodland and started out to sell it on the stump. But prospective buyers failed to appear and if they did, they offered such small sums that she decided to get a small mill to manufacture the lumber. She followed out her decision with the result that the acreage was cut and more than 300,000 feet (91,000 m) of hardwoods were sold by 1921. Quinby started out to sell the lumber and entered the market almost at the peak and thus received top prices. In selling, she made connections which caused her to enter the wholesale end of the business after her own stock of lumber became exhausted. She was selling for several mills in southwestern Ohio as well as doing a general jobbing business. She confined herself to hardwoods but contemplated taking on southern pine, cypress, and possibly shingles, and also railroad ties.

Quinby was a candidate for the Republican nomination for municipal judge at the fall 1921 primaries. Her candidacy was backed by the Ohio Woman's Republic Club.

Another first occurred for Quinby in 1924 when she became the first woman in Ohio to raise a litter of pigs to a ton of pork in 180 days and so qualified for membership in the Ohio Ton-Litter Club, an honorary organization of hog producers sponsored by the Ohio State University. Her ton-litter was also the first that was ever raised in Clermont County, so far as official records showed.

She was the founder and president of the Ohio Woman's Tax Payers' League. She was also the president of the Women's Association of Commerce.

== Personal life ==
In religion, she was a United Presbyterian.

H. Anna Quinby died in Wilmington, Ohio, (Note: According to The Michigan Alumnus, Quinby died at Columbus, Ohio.) October 28, 1931, age 60. She was buried at Edenton, Ohio.
