= Locust Corner =

Locust Corner may refer to:

- Locust Corners, Michigan, an unincorporated community
- Locust Corner, New Jersey, an unincorporated community
- Locust Corner, Ohio, an unincorporated community
