= Olive Branch (disambiguation) =

An olive branch is a branch of the olive tree, often used symbolically.

Olive Branch may also refer to:

- Olive Branch, Illinois
- Olive Branch, Mississippi
  - Olive Branch Airport
- Olive Branch, a settlement in Minton Township, Holt County, Missouri
- Olive Branch, North Carolina
- Olive Branch, Ohio
- The Olive Branch, a magazine
- HMS Olive Branch – any one of five vessels of the British Royal Navy
- Operation Olive Branch, code-name of the second Turkish military intervention in Syria starting in January 2018
- Olive Branch Petition, the 1775 petition by the Thirteen Colonies to Great Britain
