= Tabasco (disambiguation) =

Tabasco is a Mexican state.

Tabasco may also refer to:

== In food ==
- Tabasco pepper, chili pepper
- Tabasco sauce, sauce made in part from the peppers

== In geography ==
=== Mexico ===
- Tabasco, Francisco Z. Mena
- Tabasco, José María Morelos
- Tabasco, Las Margaritas
- Tabasco, Zacatecas
- Tabasco River, former name of the Grijalva River, Mexico
- Tabasco (former state), a Chontal Maya Nation

=== United States ===
- Tabasco, New York, a hamlet
- Tobasco, Ohio, an unincorporated community
- Tabasco Creek, Alaska

== Other uses ==
- Tabasco mud turtle
- Tabasco (burlesque opera), by George Whitefield Chadwick
- Simona Tabasco (born 1994), Italian actress
