= Mount Carmel Heights, Ohio =

Unincorporated community in Ohio, U.S.

Coordinates: 39°07′06″N 84°18′04″W

Mount Carmel Heights is an unincorporated community located in Clermont County, Ohio, United States.
