= Willowville, Ohio =

Unincorporated community in Ohio, U.S.

Coordinates: 39°05′44″N 84°14′54″W

Willowville is an unincorporated community in Clermont County, in the U.S. state of Ohio.

== History ==
As Donnel's Trace was laid out in 1797, a glen that was naturally pathed out ran through several communities. The borders started at School House Road, where one of the areas oldest schools existed, and ran for about a mile to the next community of Olive Branch. Willowville's neighbor to the west, Glen Este, had the closest post office; however, the much larger town of Batavia, five miles to the east, had a full-service post office as well. The developers named the settlement Willowville because of the abundance of willow trees.
