= Mount Forest Trails, Ohio =

Unincorporated community in Ohio, U.S.

Coordinates: 39°05′57″N 84°17′58″W

Mount Forest Trails is an unincorporated community located in Clermont County, Ohio, United States.
