= Tabacco =

Tabacco may refer to:

- Patrick Tabacco (born 1974), French rugby player
- Tabacco people, a First Nation in Ontario

== See also ==
- Tabaco, a city in Albay, Philippines
- Tobacco, several plants in the genus Nicotiana
- Tobacco (musician) (born Thomas Fec, 1980), American musician
- Tabasco (disambiguation)
