= Braziers, Ohio =

Unincorporated community in the United States

Coordinates: 39°3′43″N 84°13′29″W

Braziers is an unincorporated community in Clermont County, in the U.S. state of Ohio.

== History ==
A post office called Brazier was established in 1879, and remained in operation until 1895. Henry Brazier, the first postmaster, gave the community its name.

It is home to West Clermont Middle School; the former site of Amelia High School.
