= Cedron, Ohio =

Unincorporated community in Ohio, U.S.

Coordinates: 38°48′20″N 84°3′17″W

Cedron is an unincorporated community in Clermont County, in the U.S. state of Ohio.

== History ==
Cedron was platted in 1851. A post office was established at Cedron in 1851, and remained in operation until 1906.
