= Clover, Ohio =

Unincorporated community in Ohio, U.S.

Coordinates: 38°59′55″N 84°2′34″W

Clover is an unincorporated community in Clermont County, in the U.S. state of Ohio.

== History ==
A post office called Clover was established in 1847, and remained in operation until 1863. Besides the post office, Clover had a country store and the Clover church, from which the town took its name.
