= Hills, Ohio =

Unincorporated community in Ohio, U.S.

Coordinates: 39°15′19″N 84°11′15″W

Hills is an unincorporated community in Clermont County, in the U.S. state of Ohio.

== History ==
A variant name was Hills Station. A post office called Hills Station was established in 1870, and remained in operation until 1925. Besides the post office, Hills Station had a country store and a depot on the Cincinnati and Marietta Railroad.
