= Blairsville, Ohio =

Unincorporated community in Ohio, U.S.

Coordinates: 38°59′33″N 84°17′32″W

Blairsville is an unincorporated community in Clermont County, in the U.S. state of Ohio.

== History ==
Blairsville was named for John M. Blair, who started a brick factory there in the 1870s.
