= Modest, Ohio =

- Unincorporated community
- Location within Ohio
- Coordinates: 39°11′35″N 84°06′26″W
- Country: United States
- State: Ohio
- County: Clermont
- Elevation: 886 ft (270 m)
- Time zone: UTC-5 (Eastern (EST))
  - Summer (DST): UTC-4 (EDT)
- GNIS feature ID: 1065042

Modest is an unincorporated community in Clermont County, Ohio, United States.

Modest is located on Ohio State Route 727, next to Stonelick Creek.
