= Felicity–Franklin High School =

Felicity-Franklin High School
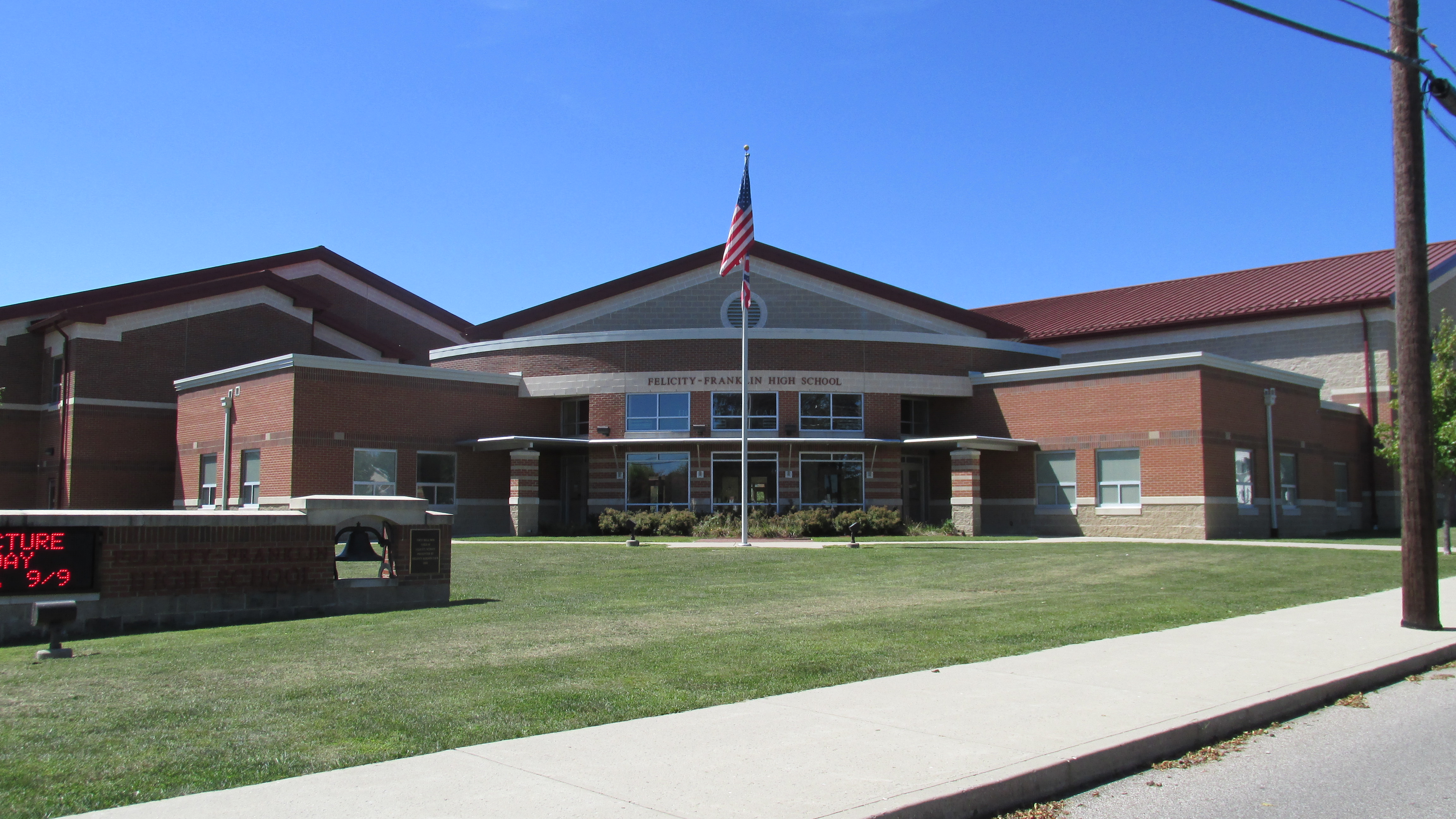
- Home of the Fighting Cardinals

Location
- 105 Market St. Felicity, (Clermont County), Ohio 45120; United States
- Coordinates: 38°50′13″N 84°5′54″W

Information
- Type: Public, Coeducational high school
- Superintendent: Robert Walker
- Principal: Casey Smith
- Teaching staff: 13.54 (FTE)
- Student to teacher ratio: 12.78
- Colors: Red and White
- Athletics conference: Southern Buckeye Athletic/Academic Conference
- Mascot: Cardinals
- Team name: Cardinals
- Website: www.felicityschools.org

Felicity-Franklin High School is a public high school in Felicity, Ohio. It is the only high school in the Felicity-Franklin Local Schools district.
