= Stonelick Covered Bridge =

- U.S. National Register of Historic Places
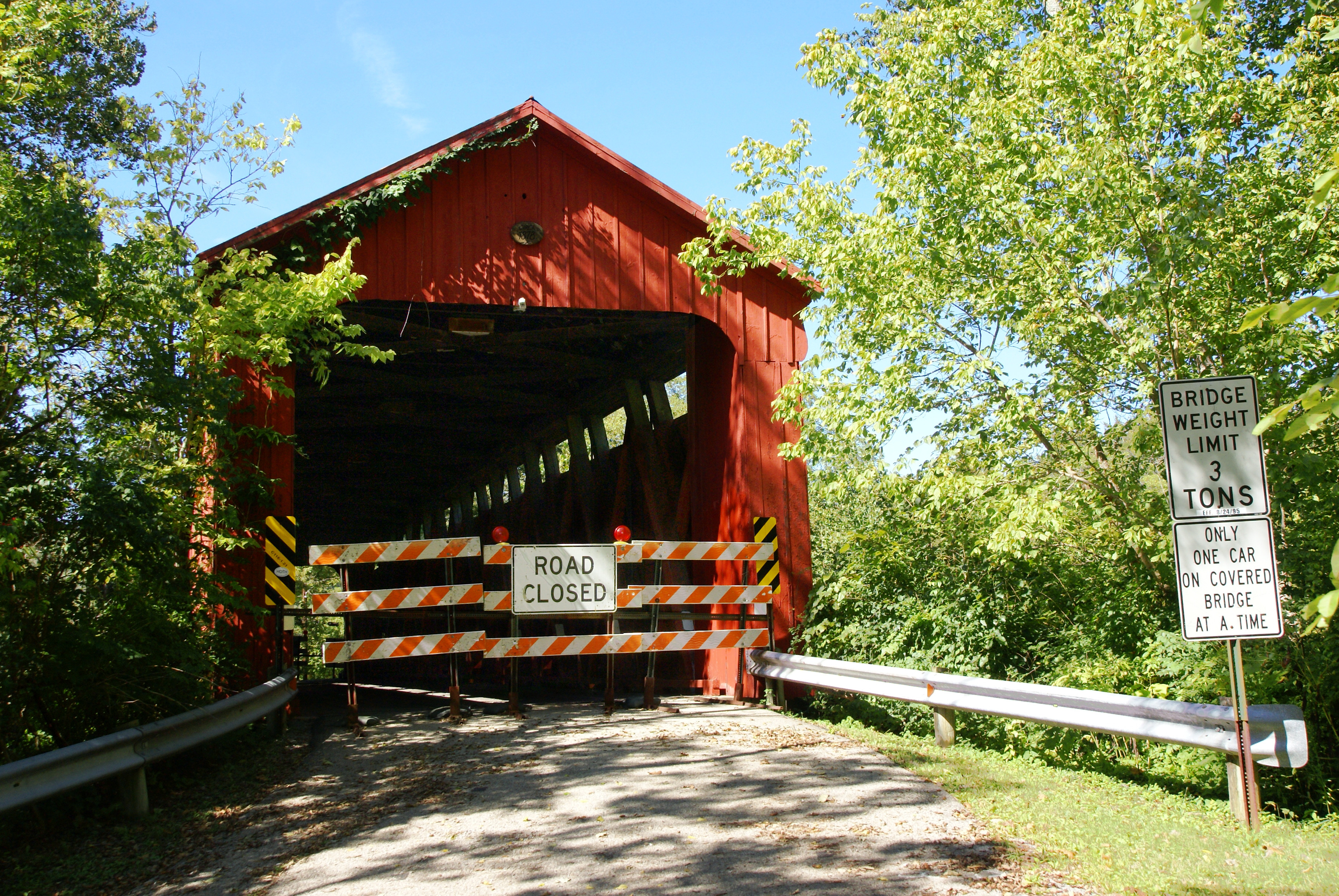

- Location within Ohio Location within the United States
- Nearest city: Owensville, Ohio
- Coordinates: 39°7′52″N 84°11′14″W
- Area: less than one acre
- Built: 1878
- NRHP reference No.: 74001419
- Added to NRHP: September 10, 1974

The Stonelick Covered Bridge is located on Stonelick-Williams Corner Road in Clermont County, Ohio, crossing the Stonelick Creek. The one-lane covered bridge was built in 1878. It is 140 feet long and supported using a 12-panel Howe truss. The property was added to the National Register on September 10, 1974, being the last surviving covered bridge in Clermont County.

== Damage, rehabilitation, and collapse ==
In 1983 a garbage truck broke through the floor. It also suffered some fire damage in 1991. A creek bank revetment project was undertaken in 1999 to prevent further erosion from undermining the bridge.

The bridge was permanently closed to all traffic in May 2010 after its floor and supporting structure was severely damaged by an overweight truck. Repair and rehabilitation, including improvements to raise the weight limit from 3 to 12 tons, was initially estimated to cost $1.2 million USD.

After funds and approval for the rehabilitation project were obtained, a request for bids was made in April 2013, with an updated engineer's estimate of work at $720,000. Construction work began in October 2013. A temporary steel falsework was constructed under the bridge to give additional structural support during the work and to provide work platforms, followed by the removal of all the siding. Additional work to be performed included the replacement of all siding and the roof, additional structural support, repointing and grouting of stonework, and addition of lighting and security systems.

On February 11, 2014, the upper shell of the bridge unexpectedly collapsed, falling off the deck and into the river bed, as repair work was being performed. All workers escaped without serious injury. After assessing the collapse, the County and the contractor have determined to continue the process of restoring the bridge. They completely disassembled the bridge, inspected each component to determine whether it needs to be replaced, and continued and finished the restoration as originally planned, using as many original components as possible.

On February 1, 2015, the bridge opened to the public and is still one lane. It is still banning large trucks but can now support 8 tons as stated on the sign.
