= Ninemile, Ohio =

Unincorporated community in Ohio, U.S.

Coordinates: 39°2′22″N 84°17′52″W

Ninemile is an unincorporated community in Clermont County, in the U.S. state of Ohio.

== History ==
A post office called Nine Mile was established in 1880, the name was changed to Ninemile in 1895, and the post office closed in 1905. The community takes its name from nearby Ninemile Creek.
