= Mount Holly, Clermont County, Ohio =

Unincorporated community in Ohio, U.S.

Coordinates: 39°0′48″N 84°10′53″W

Mount Holly (also Fair Oak) is an unincorporated community in Clermont County, in the U.S. state of Ohio.

== History ==
A post office called Mount Holly was established in 1866, and remained in operation until 1935. Besides the post office, Mount Holly had a country store.
