= Simpkinsville, Ohio =

Coordinates: 39.172397°N 84.152062°W

Simpkinsville is a ghost town in Clermont County, in the U.S. state of Ohio. It was located in Stonelick Township.

== History ==
Simpkinsville was named for David Simpkins, who started a cooper shop there in the 1820s.
