= Hennings Mill, Ohio =

Unincorporated community in Ohio, U.S.

Coordinates: 39°0′50″N 84°1′50″W

Hennings Mill is an unincorporated community in Clermont County, in the U.S. state of Ohio.

== History ==
A post office called Hennings Mill was established in 1857, and remained in operation until 1907. The community was named for J. N. Henning, the first postmaster and proprietor of the local mill.
