= Elk Lick, Ohio =

Extinct town in Ohio, U.S.

Coordinates: 39°01′36″N 84°07′47″W

Elk Lick is an extinct town in Clermont County, in the U.S. state of Ohio. The GNIS classifies it as a populated place.

== History ==
Elk Lick was named for a mineral lick of the same name.
