= Monterey, Clermont County, Ohio =

Unincorporated community in Ohio, U.S.

Coordinates: 39°08′01″N 84°04′53″W

Monterey is an unincorporated community in Clermont County, in the U.S. state of Ohio.

== History ==
A post office called Monterey was established in 1847, and was discontinued in 1957. The community was named in commemoration of the Battle of Monterey (1846).
