= Rural, Ohio =

Unincorporated community in Ohio, U.S.

Coordinates: 38°46′42″N 84°5′23″W

Rural is an unincorporated community in Clermont County, in the U.S. state of Ohio.

== History ==
Rural was laid out in 1845. A post office was established at Rural in 1845, and remained in operation until 1911.
