= Moores Fork, Ohio =

Unincorporated community in Ohio, U.S.

Coordinates: 39°11′48″N 84°1′23″W

Moores Fork is an unincorporated community in Clermont County, in the U.S. state of Ohio.

== History ==
A post office called Moores Fork was established in 1884, and remained in operation until 1906. The community takes its name from nearby Moores Fork creek.
