= Clermont Northeastern High School =

Public high school in Ohio, United States

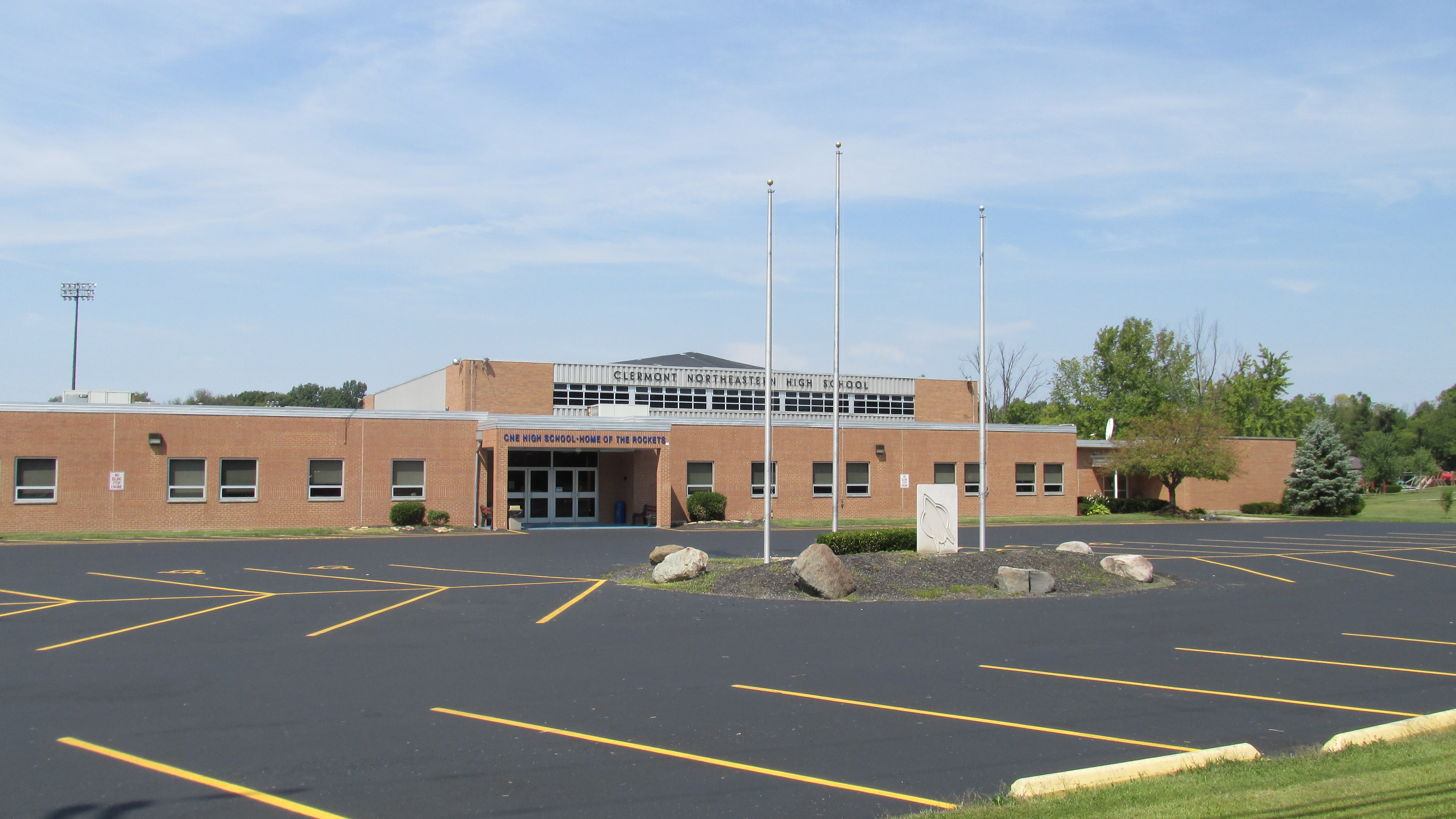

Location
- 5327 Hutchinson Road; Batavia, Ohio; Batavia, (Clermont County), Ohio 45103; United States
- Coordinates: 39°7′50″N 84°6′7″W

Information
- Type: Public, Coeducational high school
- Motto: Rocket Pride
- School district: Clermont Northeastern Schools
- Superintendent: T.J. Dorsey
- Principal: Shane Hartley
- Grades: 9-12
- Average class size: 24
- Colors: Blue and Gold
- Fight song: CNE Fight Song; On Northeastern
- Athletics conference: Southern Buckeye Athletic/Academic Conference
- Sports: Baseball, Softball, Basketball, Soccer, Golf, Track and Field, Cross-Country, Volleyball, Tennis, Academic Quiz Team, Cheerleading, Marching Band, Bowling, Fishing, Wrestling.
- Mascot: The Rocket Man
- Team name: Rockets
- Rival: Batavia High School
- Accreditation: North Central Association of Colleges and Schools
- Newspaper: The Jyst
- Website: http://www.cneschools.org

Clermont Northeastern High School is a public high school in northeastern Clermont County near Batavia, Ohio, and Owensville, Ohio. It is the only high school in the Clermont Northeastern Schools district. The school mascot is the Rocket.
