= Woodville, Clermont County, Ohio =

Unincorporated community in Ohio, U.S.

Coordinates: 39°15′18″N 84°0′39″W

Woodville is an unincorporated community in Clermont County, in the U.S. state of Ohio.

== History ==
Woodville was laid out in 1828 by Jesse Wood, and named for him. A variant name was West Woodville. A post office called West Woodville was established in 1837, and remained in operation until 1906.
