= Hamlet, Ohio =

Coordinates: 39°01′08″N 84°11′59″W

Hamlet is a populated place in Batavia, a township of Clermont County, Ohio. Hamlet's elevation is 876 feet above sea level.
