= Laurel, Ohio =

Unincorporated community in Ohio, U.S.

Coordinates: 38°54′55″N 84°11′30″W

Laurel is an unincorporated community in Clermont County, in the U.S. state of Ohio.

== History ==
Laurel was originally called Van Burenville, and under the latter name was laid out in 1837. A post office called Laurel was established in 1844, and remained in operation until 1907.
