= Edenton, Ohio =

Unincorporated community in Ohio, U.S.

- Location within Ohio
- Coordinates: 39.228°N 84.053°W
- Country: United States
- State: Ohio
- County: Clermont County
- Township: Wayne Township

Edenton is a small unincorporated community in Wayne Township, Clermont County, Ohio. State Routes 133 and 727 intersect through it, and Stonelick State Park is nearby.

== History ==
Edenton was laid out in 1837. A post office called Edenton was established in 1848, and remained in operation until 1983.

== Notable people ==
- H. Anna Quinby (1871–1931), lawyer, editor, business manager, social reformer

== Gallery ==
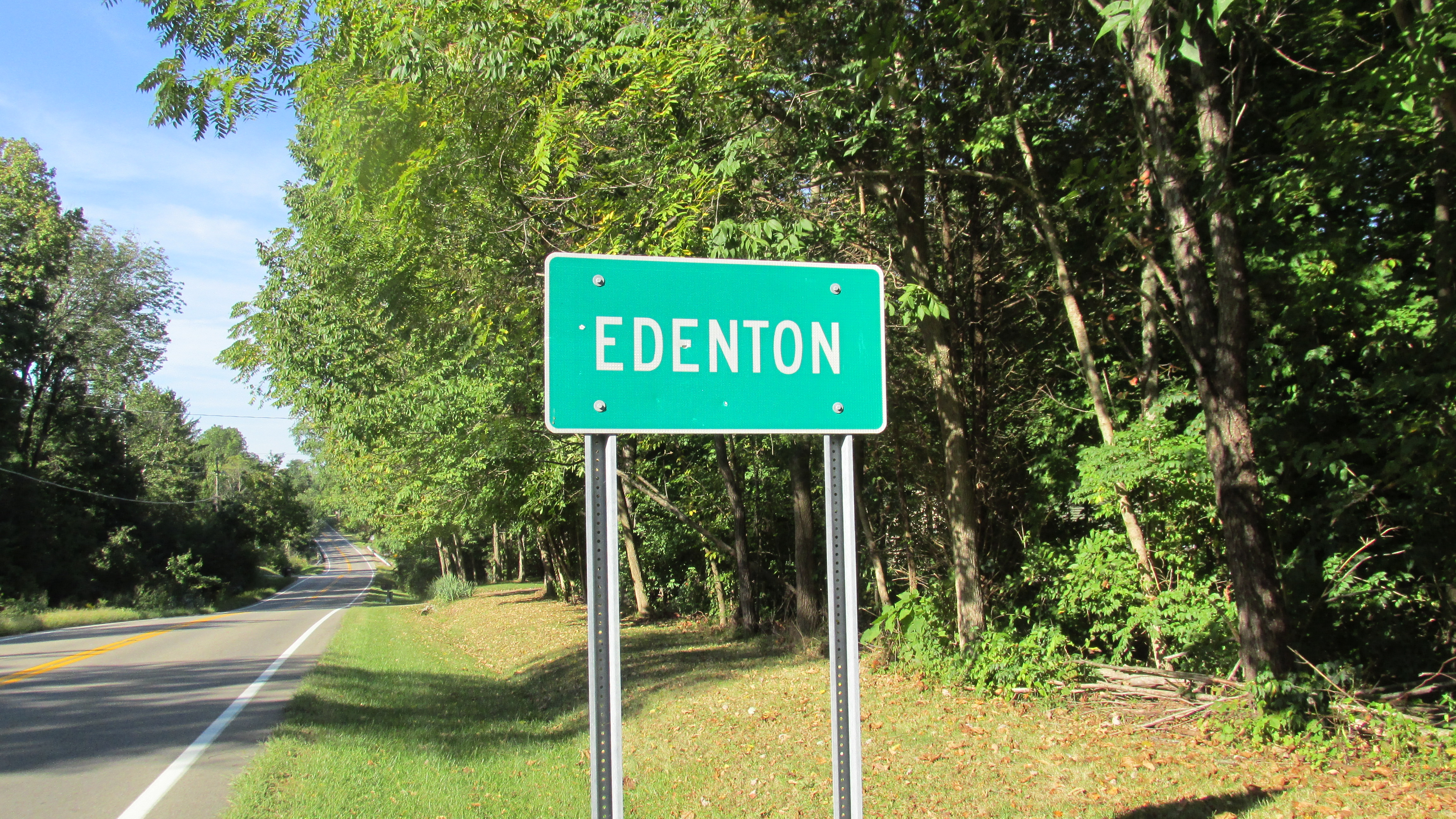
Edenton community sign

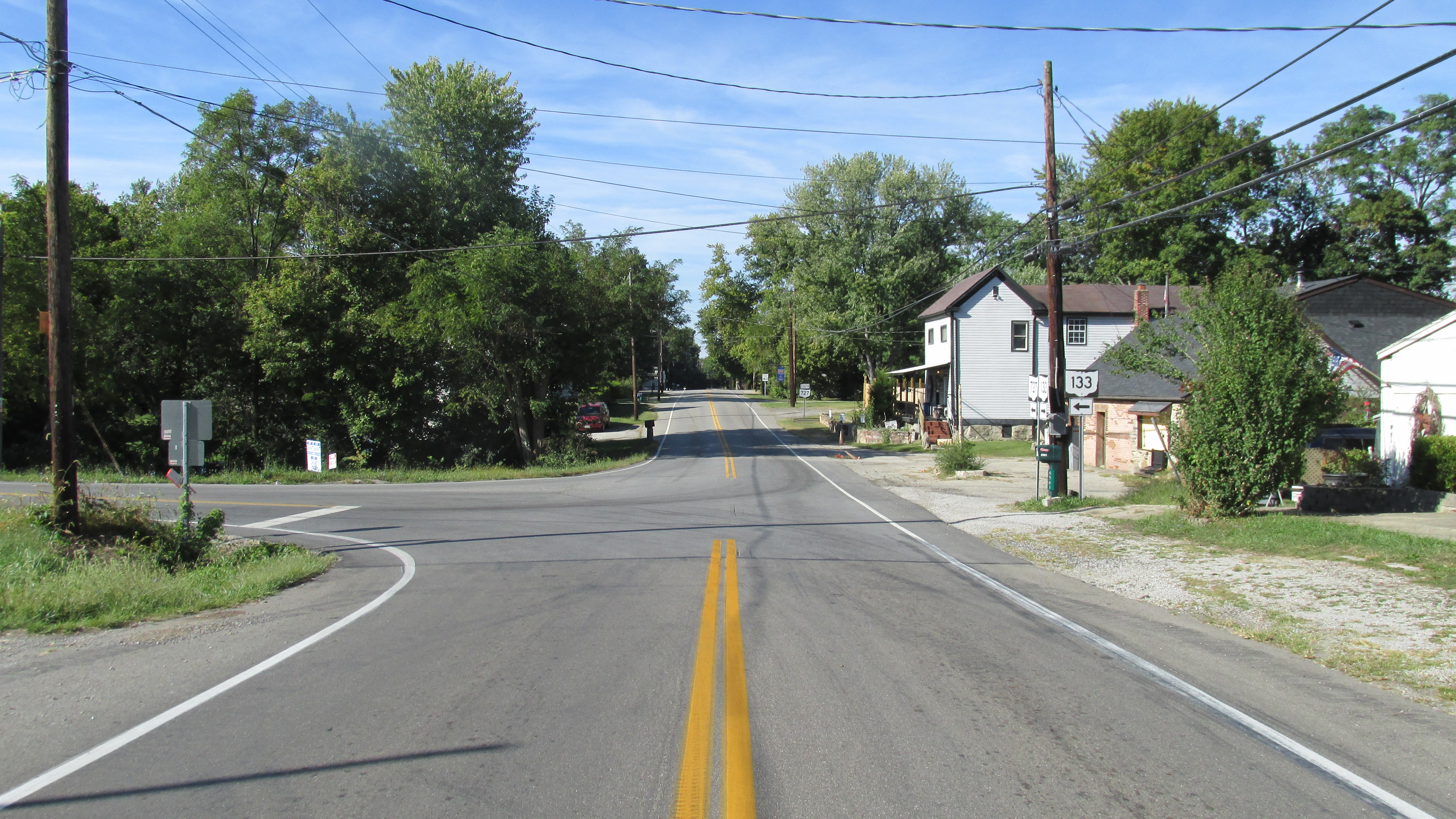
Looking south at the junction of Ohio Highways 133 and 727 in Edenton
