= Saltair, Ohio =

Community in the U.S. state of Ohio

Coordinates: 38°55′37″N 84°8′33″W

Saltair is an unincorporated community in Clermont County, in the U.S. state of Ohio.

== History ==
A post office called Salt Air was established in 1878, the name was changed to Saltair in 1895, and the post office closed in 1907. The community was named for the local Salt family, which owned land near the original town site.
