= Blowville, Ohio =

Unincorporated community in Ohio, U.S.

Coordinates: 39°5′52″N 84°2′44″W

Blowville is an unincorporated community in Clermont County, in the U.S. state of Ohio.

== History ==
A post office called Blowville was established in 1881, and remained in operation until 1905. Besides the post office, Blowville had a country store, which opened in 1872.
