= Perintown, Ohio =

Unincorporated community in Ohio, U.S.

Coordinates: 39°8′15″N 84°14′12″W

Perintown is an unincorporated community in Clermont County, in the U.S. state of Ohio.

== History ==
A variant name was Perin's Mills. The community was named for Samuel Perin, who started a watermill at the site in 1813. A post office called Perins Mills was established in 1830, the name was changed to Perintown in 1890, and the post office closed in 1984.
