= Afton, Ohio =

Unincorporated community in Ohio, U.S.

Coordinates: 39°3′43″N 84°6′2″W

Afton is an unincorporated community in Clermont County, in the U.S. state of Ohio.

== History ==
A post office called California was established in 1849, the name was changed to Afton in 1865, and the post office closed in 1912. Besides the post office, Afton had a station on the Cincinnati & Eastern Railroad, today the Cincinnati Eastern Railroad (CCET).
