= Mount Pisgah, Ohio =

Unincorporated community in Ohio, U.S.

Coordinates: 38°59′4″N 84°13′52″W

Mount Pisgah is an unincorporated community in Ohio Township, Clermont County, in the U.S. state of Ohio.

== History ==
Mount Pisgah was not officially platted. The first post office was originally known as Lisbon. The Lisbon post office was established in 1837, the name was changed to Mount Pisgah in 1844, and the post office closed in 1907.
