= Stonelick, Ohio =

Unincorporated community in Ohio, U.S.

Coordinates: 39°7′20″N 84°11′36″W

Stonelick is an unincorporated community in Clermont County, in the U.S. state of Ohio.

== History ==
A post office named Stone Lick was established in 1859. The name was later altered to Stonelick in 1895. However, the post office ceased its operations in 1900. The community derives its name from the nearby Stonelick Creek.
