= Tobasco, Ohio =

Unincorporated community in Ohio, U.S.

Coordinates: 39°4′16″N 84°17′37″W

Tobasco is an unincorporated community in Clermont County, in the U.S. state of Ohio.

== History ==
A post office called Tobasco was established in 1878, and remained in operation until 1933. The community derives its name from Tabasco, in Mexico.
