= Locust Corner, Ohio =

Unincorporated community in Ohio, U.S.

Coordinates: 39°1′28″N 84°16′32″W

Locust Corner is an unincorporated community in Clermont County, in the U.S. state of Ohio.

== History ==
Locust Corner, originally called Pleasant Hill, had its start around 1830 when the first store opened there. A post office called Locust Corner was established in 1846, and remained in operation until 1905.
