= Tabasco Creek =

Coordinates: 61°08′N 159°28′W

Tabasco Creek is a creek in Bethel Census Area, Alaska.
