= Olive Branch, Ohio =

Unincorporated community in Ohio, U.S.

Coordinates: 39°5′6″N 84°13′12″W

Olive Branch is an unincorporated community in Clermont County, in the U.S. state of Ohio.

== History ==
Olive Branch was not officially platted. A post office called Olive Branch was established in 1845, and remained in operation until 1922.
