= Newtonsville, Ohio =

- Statutory village
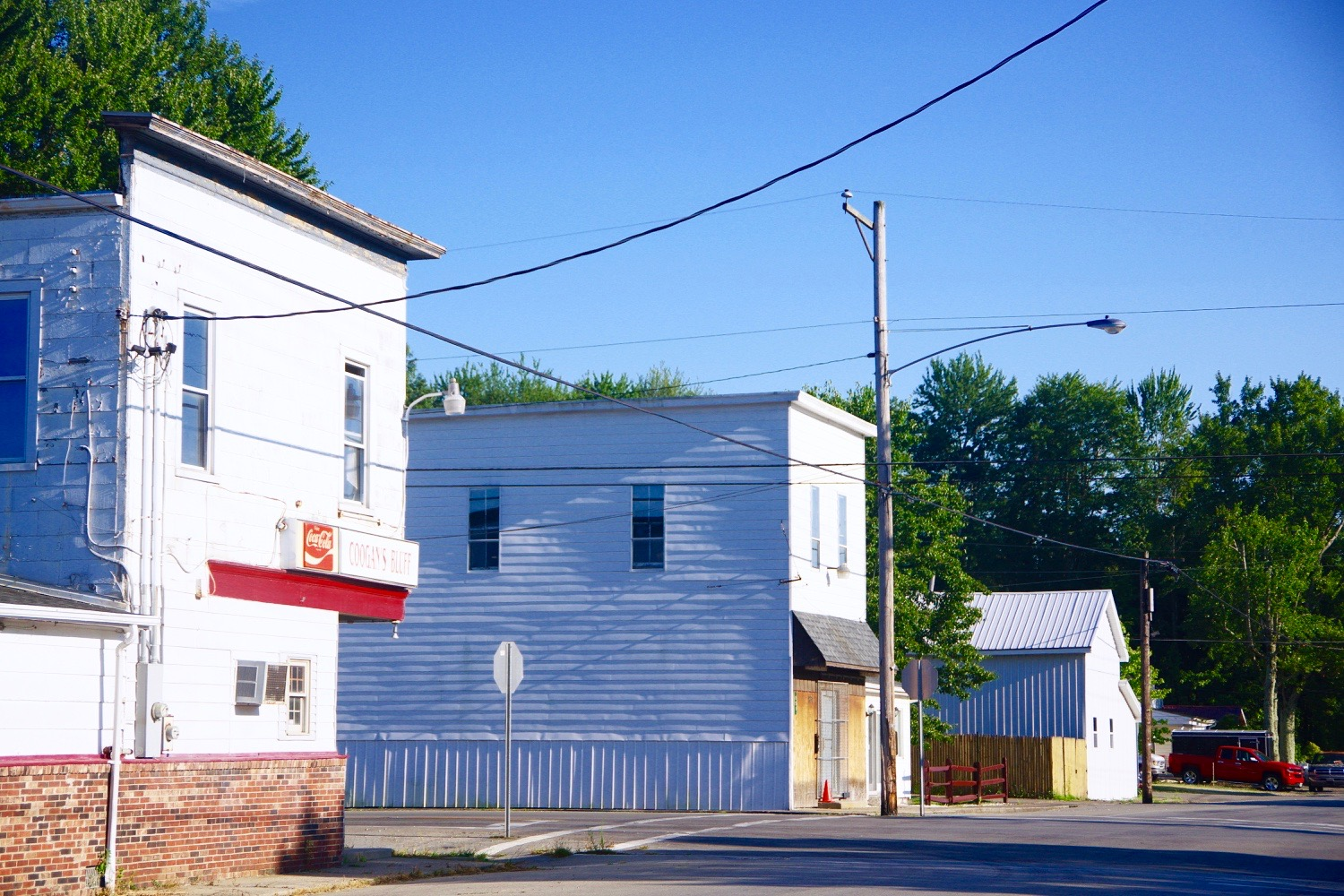
- Businesses along Cross Street

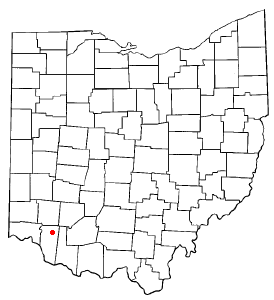
- Location of Newtonsville, Ohio

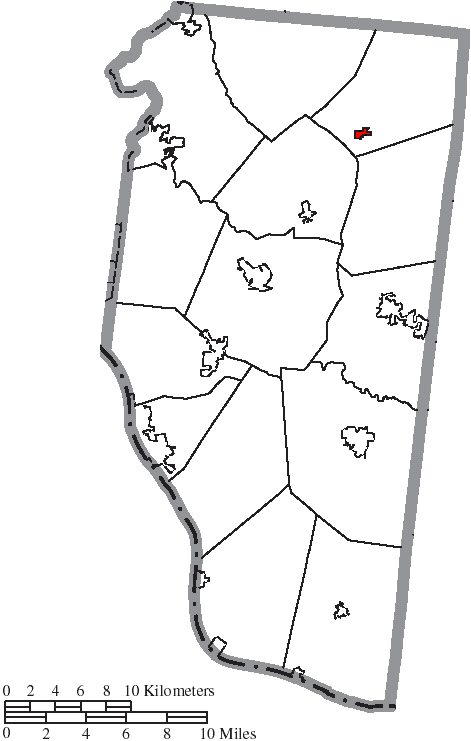
- Location of Newtonsville in Clermont County
- Coordinates: 39°10′52″N 84°5′6″W
- Country: United States
- State: Ohio
- County: Clermont
- Township: Wayne
- Platted: March 30, 1838
- Dissolved: November 25, 2019

Government
  - Mayor: Kevin Pringle

Area
  - Total: 0.19 sq mi (0.49 km^{2})
  - Land: 0.19 sq mi (0.49 km^{2})
  - Water: 0 sq mi (0.00 km^{2})
- Elevation: 899 ft (274 m)

Population (2010)
  - Total: 392
  - Estimate (2019): 376
  - Density: 1,979.6/sq mi (764.33/km^{2})
- Demonym: Newtonsvillager
- Time zone: UTC-5 (Eastern (EST))
  - Summer (DST): UTC-4 (EDT)
- ZIP code: 45158
- Area code: 513
- FIPS code: 39-55664
- GNIS feature ID: 2806431

Newtonsville is an unincorporated community and former village in Clermont County, Ohio, United States. The population was 392 at the 2010 census. In 2019, residents voted to dissolve the village.

== History ==
Newtonsville was platted on March 30, 1838, by Stephen Whitaker and Cornelius Washburn. A post office called Newtonsville has been in operation since 1847. In the 19th century, the village was home to a gristmill and chair factory. The village gradually lost business after World War I.

In 2016, the Ohio State Auditor placed the village in a state of fiscal caution due to poor bookkeeping. Despite levying a one-percent income tax, Newtonsville ran a deficit of $112,000 by 2019, prompting the auditor to declare a state of fiscal emergency in the village. On November 5, 2019, residents passed an initiative to dissolve the village and return it to Wayne Township by a margin of 53 to 46. Amelia residents voted for dissolution the same day. Dissolution took effect at 10:00 AM on November 25, 2019, when the election results were certified. A transition process up to a year long was overseen by the Ohio State Auditor.

== Geography ==
According to the United States Census Bureau, the village has a total area of 0.25 square miles (0.65 km^{2}), all land.

== Demographics ==
Historical population
Census	Pop.	Note	%±
1880	160		—
1910	142		—
1920	120		−15.5%
1930	148		23.3%
1940	166		12.2%
1950	182		9.6%
1960	339		86.3%
1970	385		13.6%
1980	434		12.7%
1990	427		−1.6%
2000	492		15.2%
2010	392		−20.3%
2019 (est.)	376		−4.1%
U.S. Decennial Census

=== 2010 census ===
As of the census of 2010, there were 392 people, 132 households, and 103 families living in the village. The population density was 1,568.0 inhabitants per square mile (605.4/km^{2}). There were 144 housing units at an average density of 576.0 per square mile (222.4/km^{2}). The racial makeup of the village was 99.0% White, 0.3% Native American, and 0.8% from two or more races. Hispanic or Latino of any race were 1.0% of the population.

There were 132 households, of which 49.2% had children under the age of 18 living with them, 57.6% were married couples living together, 12.1% had a female householder with no husband present, 8.3% had a male householder with no wife present, and 22.0% were non-families. 18.2% of all households were made up of individuals, and 6% had someone living alone who was 65 years of age or older. The average household size was 2.97 and the average family size was 3.37.

The median age in the village was 32.6 years. 30.9% of residents were under the age of 18; 8.4% were between the ages of 18 and 24; 26.8% were from 25 to 44; 23.5% were from 45 to 64; and 10.5% were 65 years of age or older. The gender makeup of the village was 48.0% male and 52.0% female.

=== 2000 census ===
As of the census of 2000, there were 492 people, 175 households, and 137 families living in the village. The population density was 2,021.8 inhabitants per square mile (780.6/km^{2}). There were 180 housing units at an average density of 739.7 per square mile (285.6/km^{2}). The racial makeup of the village was 99.59% White, 0.20% Asian, and 0.20% from two or more races. Hispanic or Latino of any race were 0.41% of the population.

There were 175 households, out of which 37.7% had children under the age of 18 living with them, 65.7% were married couples living together, 5.7% had a female householder with no husband present, and 21.7% were non-families. 17.1% of all households were made up of individuals, and 6.3% had someone living alone who was 65 years of age or older. The average household size was 2.81 and the average family size was 3.15.

In the village, the population was spread out, with 28.0% under the age of 18, 7.5% from 18 to 24, 34.6% from 25 to 44, 21.7% from 45 to 64, and 8.1% who were 65 years of age or older. The median age was 34 years. For every 100 females there were 100.0 males. For every 100 females age 18 and over, there were 104.6 males.

The median income for a household in the village was $42,000, and the median income for a family was $49,167. Males had a median income of $37,500 versus $20,893 for females. The per capita income for the village was $18,715. About 11.8% of families and 15.5% of the population were below the poverty line, including 18.8% of those under age 18 and 12.9% of those age 65 or over.

== Gallery ==
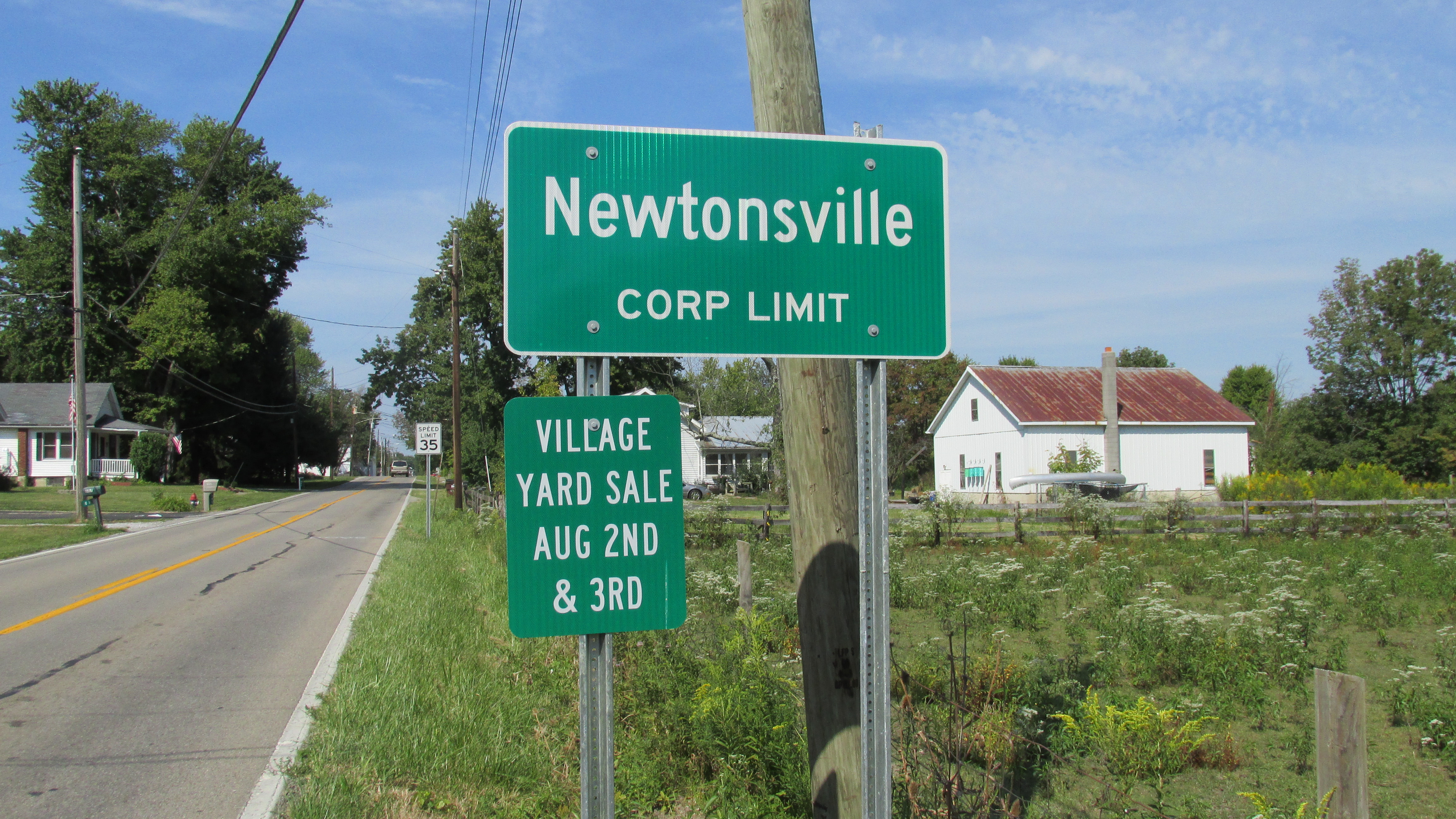
Newtonsville corporation limit sign.

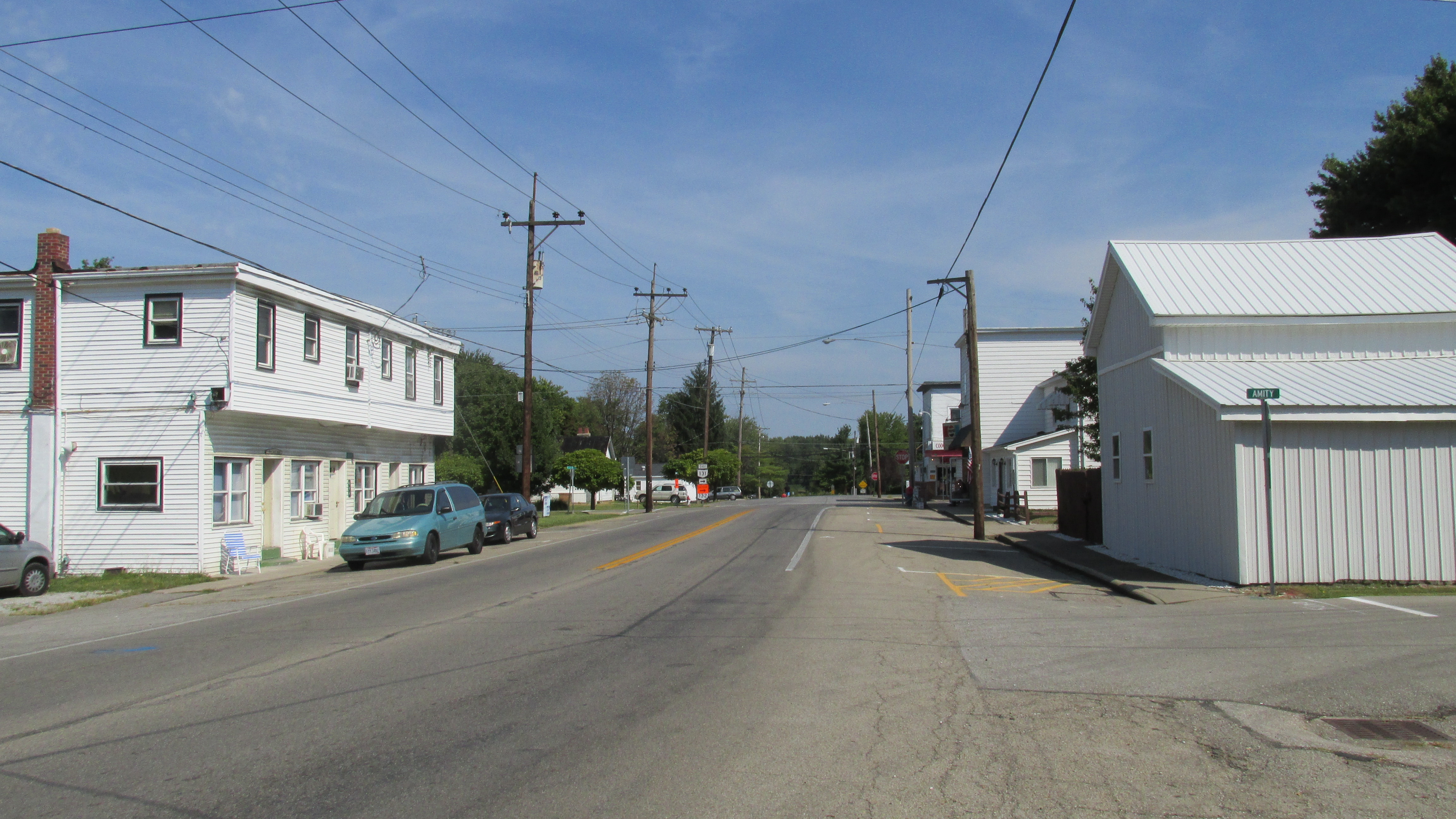
Looking north towards the intersection of West Main Street, Cross and Wright Streets in Newtonsville.
