= Glen Este, Ohio =

USA unincorporated area

Glen Este is an unincorporated area of Union Township, in Clermont County, Ohio, United States.

== History ==
Glen Este, Ohio, is named for early resident David K. Este, who owned a farm near the intersection of Glen Este-Withamsville Road and the railroad tracks, now State Route 32. He was an officer of the Cincinnati, Georgetown, and Portsmouth Railroad and had a combination station and post office established on his land. The main road in town ran through the area of Donnell's Trace, now old State Route 74, passing through a glen, hence the name.

The Glen Este post office was established in July 1878 with an insignificant sign on the door that read: "The Eastgate to Cincinnati". One hundred years later, the nickname Eastgate came to be a regional name for the area around Glen Este. The once thriving downtown district on the Cincinnati Batavia Pike, Old State Route 74, has since shifted somewhat to the Eastgate Shopping district near Interstate 275.

Glen Este is split with two ZIP codes; the west side uses Cincinnati addresses and has a zipcode of 45245, while to the east of Clermont Lane, Batavia addresses begin, using 45103.

The community was also home to Glen Este High School since 1963. Glen Este High School and Amelia High School have become West Clermont High School for the beginning of the 2017 school Year. It's located at the corner of Clough Pike and Bach Buxton Rd in the small community of Braziers.

Some of the businesses that were popular from the 1940s through the 1970s were, Micky McGuire's General Store, Charlie McGuire's gas station and garage, Maurice's Grocery Store, Flick's Pony Keg, Pearl's Beauty Shop, which was owned by Willard and Pearl Pitman, and Tom Clepper Construction, who built most of the ranch-style slab homes in the area. This small community actually had four barber shops at one time. One of the oldest remaining homes in town is the Jackson estate, still owned by the family, as well as one of the county's largest lakes, Jackson's Lake.

Next to the lake is a log cabin that has been operating as a tavern under many different names for many different owners for over a hundred years. Native American arrowheads have been found embedded in the construction. One of the longest-running ownerships of the tavern was Claude and Hazel Jackson, who ran it as The Copper Stallion bar and restaurant until it burned down to the ground from an air conditioning unit in 1955. The two large fireplaces were the only things still standing in the rubble, and as a remembrance are still in place. Newer homes with boat docks were built surrounding the lake.

== Geography/geology ==
Most, if not all, the rural farmland and vacant property owned by the Williams, the Culberstons, the Shepherds, the Aicholtzs, the Shalemans, the Seebohms, and the McQuire brothers are currently zoned for business and were replaced by franchised restaurants and other businesses. All the homes in the original subdivision of Clepper Lane and Fayard Drive have been rezoned for business, which will allow the already sprawling shopping area to spread even farther. Clepper Lane was a dead-end street for 70 years, but in 2020, the street was extended east to meet Bach-Buxton Road and west to meet Aicholtz Road. On the north side of Old 74, the homes on Clermont Lane, Glen Este Lane, Tealtown Road, and Glendale Road are still unscathed by the sprawl.

Glen Willow Lake, which straddles Glen Este and Willowville, has survived and can be seen from the back lot of Jeff Wyler car dealerships. The much smaller Kennedy's Lake, an old pay lake, next to it was drained, and an old airplane runway running to it was dozed away as new apartments and town homes were built at the old Kennedy estate. The private runway belonged to a former resident in the 1940s and 1950s, a Dr. Kennedy, who kept a small plane at his home. Another private lake owned by the Williams was also drained to build the area's first Bigg's store (now Jungle Jims) in the mid-1980s. Wuebold Lake was the original name of the lake that Glen Este Junior and Senior High Schools surround; however, the name is long forgotten by most. The Wuebolds, another large farm family in the area, sold most of their property to make way for the construction of the high school in 1963. In recent years, Kennedy's Lake has been refilled by a private owner.

== Donnell's Trace ==
Donnell's Trace was a road already pathed out by a natural glen often used by the native-American Indians, and travelers, including the Underground Railroad and Morgan's Raiders. John Donnells laid out the road in 1797, which started in Mercersburg (now Newtown) to Lytlestown (now Williamsburg) and later continued to Ohio's first capital, Chillicothe. It was assigned the state route number of 74 in 1923 but was discontinued in 1963 because the parallel highway, State Route 32, was originally planned to be the continuation of Interstate-74 from Indianapolis, but for unknown reasons, it never came about. Old 74 has been reduced to a seven-mile stretch that weaves in and out of St Rt 32, beginning in Mt Carmel and going through Summerside, Glen Este, Willowville, and Olive Branch, then continuing to blend in with Rt 32 to Batavia. On the Mt. Carmel side, another piece of the road has been cut off at 32 and has become part of Aicholtz Road. While the locals still call it Old 74, it's officially Cincinnati Batavia Pike.

== Notable residents ==
In the past few years, the area has also been the home of musician and record producer Bootsy Collins and jazz musician Michael Moore, who hails from Glen Este. Moore was a bassist with bandleaders like Woody Herman in the 1960s and Dave Brubeck in 2008. In 2018, he was inducted into the Cincinnati Jazz Hall of Fame.

== Etymology ==
Written sources say that the town was partially named for Mr. Este. What this may mean is that the area was already named, and Mr. Este coincidentally became the first resident, so they gave him credit. Some atlas books from the 1800s have the area as simply Glen. So why wasn’t it called Este Glen? The words glen este are already an established old Latin term meaning meadow view. There are several roads and areas in the United States named Glen Este that have nothing to do with anyone named Este. So this area very well could have become Glen Este without Mr. Este or possibly Meadow View.

== Sources ==
=== News ===
- "Spotlight". The Cincinnati Enquirer. 3 Apr 1992. p. 89 – via Newspapers.com.
- "$40M senior project planned for Glen Este site". 27 Feb 2019. p. A4 – via Newspapers.com.

=== Websites ===
- "Michael Moore". Apple Music.
- "2018 Hall of Fame Inductees—Michael Moore, bassist". Cincinnati Jazz Hall of Fame.
