= Stonelick State Park =

Park in Ohio, USA

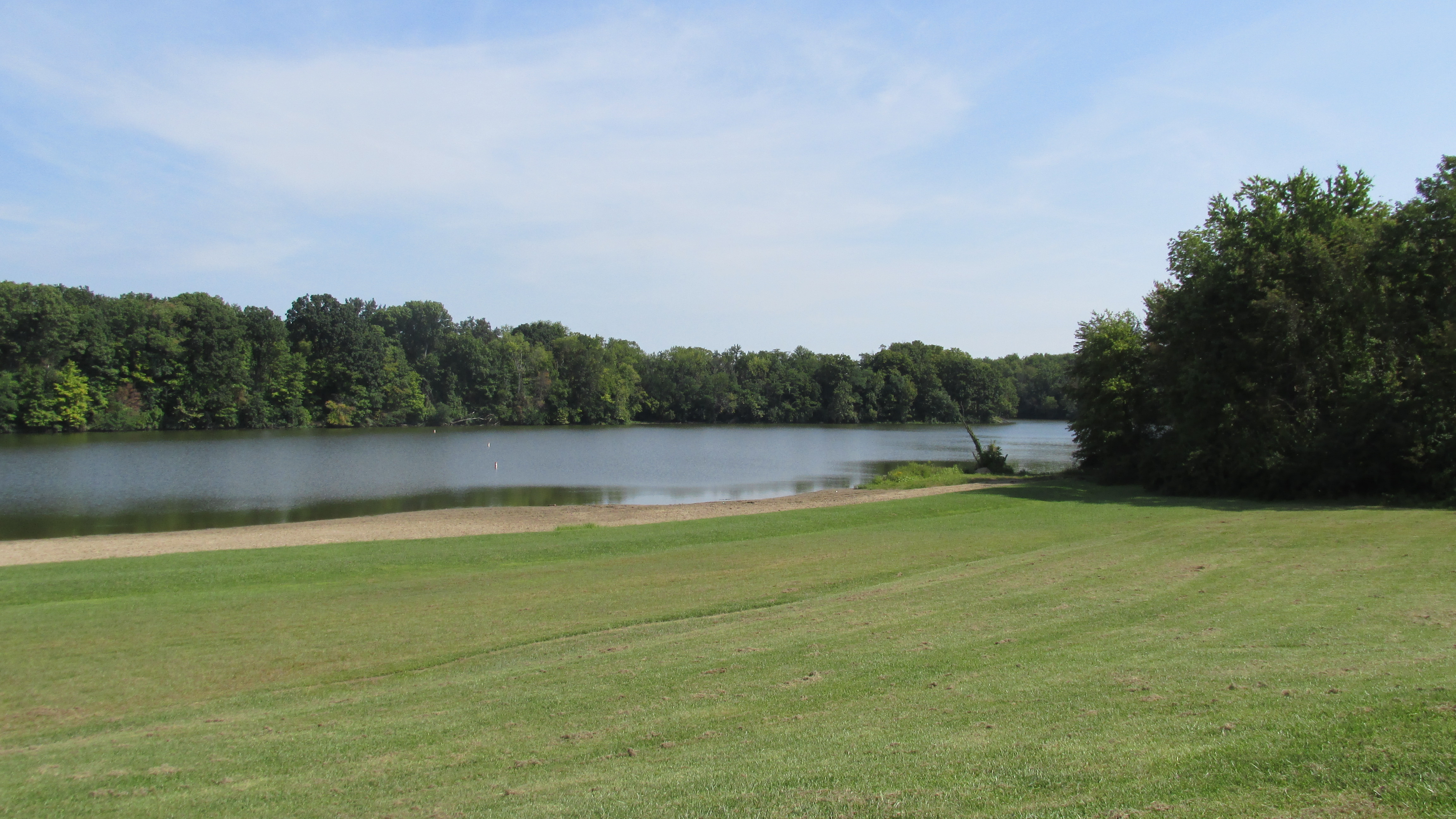
- Stonelick Lake

- Location within Ohio Location within the United States
- Location: Clermont County, Ohio, United States
- Coordinates: 39°13′06″N 84°03′49″W
- Area: Land: 1,058 acres (428 ha); Water: 200 acres (81 ha)
- Elevation: 873 feet (266 m)
- Established: 1948
- Administrator: Ohio Department of Natural Resources
- Designation: Ohio state park
- Website: Stonelick State Park

Stonelick State Park is a public recreation area located off Ohio State Route 727, 24 miles (39 km) east of central Cincinnati, in Wayne Township, Clermont County, Ohio, United States. The state park covers 1,058 acres (428 ha) of land and 200 acres (81 ha) of water. Park activities include fishing, hunting, hiking, disc golf, picnicking, swimming, boating, and camping.

== History ==
The land for the park was acquired in 1948, and a dam at the west side of the lake was completed in 1950, which created the lake. Since the park's inception, there was a wastewater leak that damaged the ecology of the lake. The lake was dredged in the 1990s to restore the contamination levels of the lake to those that are safe for wildlife and swimming.
