= Clermont County, Ohio =

County in Ohio, United States

- County
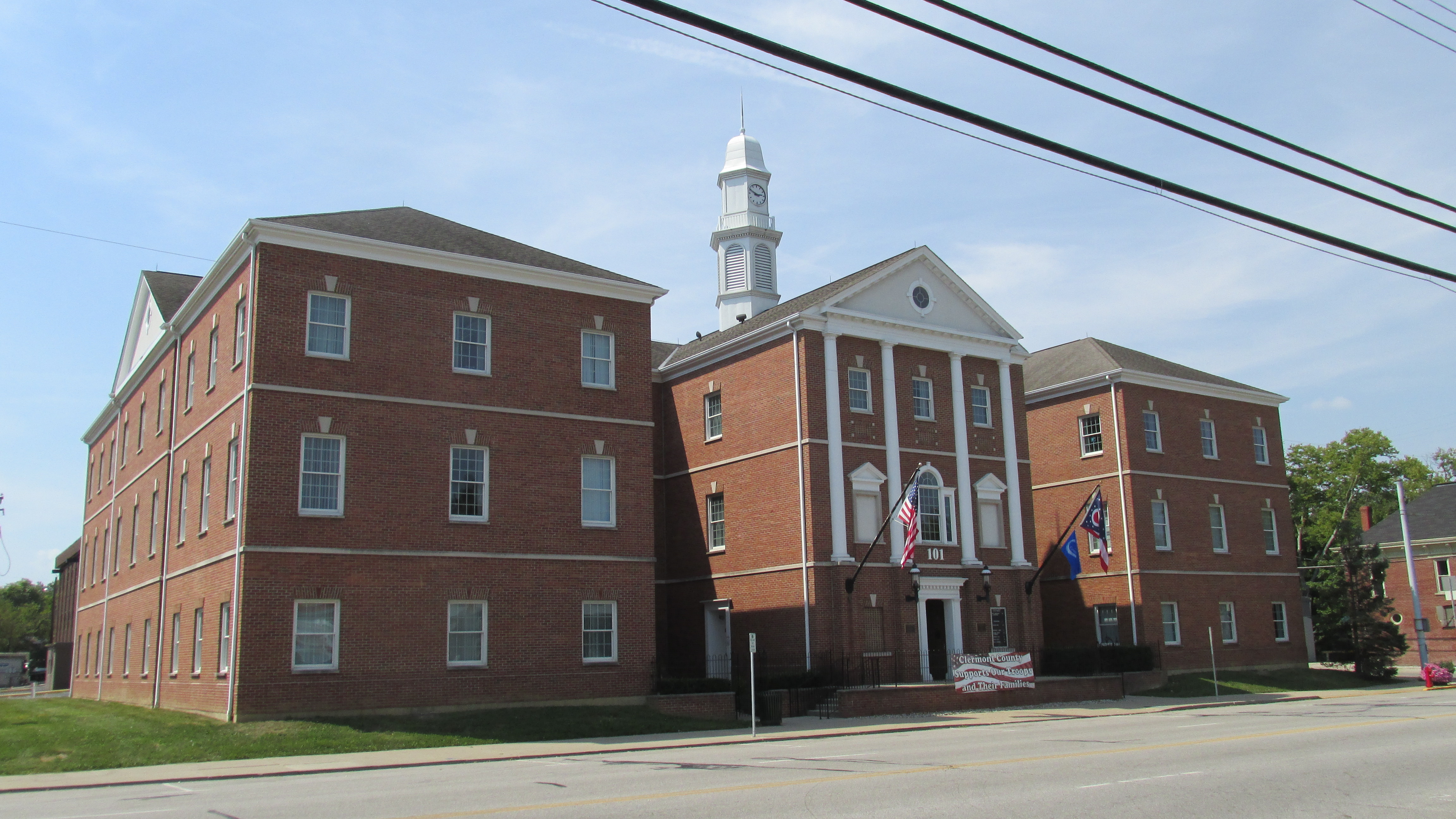
- Clermont Commission Building, Batavia

- Flag Seal

- Location within the U.S. state of Ohio
- Coordinates: 39°03′N 84°09′W
- Country: United States
- State: Ohio
- Founded: December 6, 1800
- Named for: Clermont-Ferrand, France
- Seat: Batavia
- Largest city: Milford

Area
  - Total: 460 sq mi (1,200 km^{2})
  - Land: 452 sq mi (1,170 km^{2})
  - Water: 7.7 sq mi (20 km^{2}) 1.7%

Population (2020)
  - Total: 208,601
  - Estimate (2025): 216,977 ▲
  - Density: 462/sq mi (178/km^{2})
- Time zone: UTC−5 (Eastern)
  - Summer (DST): UTC−4 (EDT)
- Congressional district: 2nd
- Website: http://www.clermontcountyohio.gov/

Clermont County (/ˈklɛərmɒnt/ KLAIR-mont) is a county in the U.S. state of Ohio. As of the 2020 census, the population was 208,601. Ordinanced in 1800 as part of the Virginia Military District, Clermont is Ohio's eighth oldest county, the furthest county west in Appalachian Ohio, and the eleventh oldest county of the former Northwest Territory. Clermont County is part of the Cincinnati, OH-KY-IN Metropolitan Statistical Area. The county is named from the French "clear hills or mountain." Its county seat is Batavia, while its largest city is Milford.

== History ==
Clermont's name is borrowed from a prefecture in France notable as the home of Celtic leader Vercingetorix who led the unified Gallic resistance to Roman invasion. Clermont connotes "clear mountain," which describes the hills when viewed through the thick Ohio River fog. During the Age of Discovery, the French became the first recorded Europeans to see this land from the Ohio River, though Clermont's population dates to the Paleoindian, Adena, Hopewell, and Fort Ancient cultures. The Gatch Site and other sites provide glimpses into what life was like for these people. The Shawnee, Miami, Lenape, Mingo, Odawa, Cherokee, and Wyandot each have or had a presence in Clermont.

=== Ordinance and subsequent settlement ===
At its ordinance in 1800 by the Commonwealth of Virginia to reward Virginian military veterans with land bounties, Clermont encompassed twenty-three current Ohio counties and over 4.2 million acres of dense old-growth forest. The first deed was issued on February 20, 1796. George Washington owned three parcels of land in Clermont County, whose first capital was Williamsburg, founded by William Lytle, and like Milford, was founded in 1796. A stone dairy house, constructed in 1800, is thought to be the oldest standing building in Clermont. The edifice is located beside Harmony Hill on South Third Street in Williamsburg. Harmony Hill, one of the area's first farms, was built by William Lytle. The last American Indian village was located two miles south of Marathon in Jackson Township, along the mouth of Grassy Run on the East Fork of the Little Miami River. The site saw the largest frontier battle in Clermont, the Battle of Grassy Run, during which pioneer Simon Kenton clashed with chief Tecumseh on April 10, 1792. The Wyandot lived at this site until 1811. The Bullskin Trail, once a major American Indian trail, runs north and south through Clermont along Ohio Route 133, and was used by frontiersmen Kenton and Daniel Boone on hunting and warfare expeditions. In 1823, New Richmond became the seat, and in 1824, the seat moved to Batavia, the county's current seat. Clermont's Moscow became the exiled home of French royalty during the early 1800s, including future King of France Louis-Philippe in 1815 and the Marquis de Lafayette in 1825. Point Pleasant was birthplace and boyhood home of military hero, Union general, and President Ulysses S. Grant, born on April 27, 1822; although Grant spent little time in Clermont, and both his political and military careers were disconnected from it.

During the 1800s, antislavery sentiment remained strong. Bethel was the residence of Democratic United States Senator Thomas Morris who also served three terms in the Ohio House of Representatives, as Ohio Supreme Court Justice, and four terms in the Ohio Senate. His U.S. Senate career lasted from 1833 to 1839, and in 1844, Morris was the vice presidential candidate for a third party with the goal of abolishing slavery—approximately sixteen years before the first antislavery Republican president.

=== Utopia, anarchist commune ===
Also in 1844, Clermont became the site of the first of three major anarchist settlements at Utopia, as an egalitarian haven of Puritans who espoused the doctrines of François Marie Charles Fourier. Peer-reviewed research about the mysterious village reveals Utopia's unique profile within national history. The three major elements of anarchism at Utopia included "a socialist movement inspired by the teachings of Charles Fourier ... spiritualist/abolitionist undertaking led by John O. Wattles, and, finally, [the] labor-capital approach by proto-anarchist Josiah Warren" (p. 3). The settlements included the Clermont Phalanx (in 1844); a second albeit spiritualist settlement at the previous site, led by Wattles, to be called Excelsior (in 1847); and a contemporaneous yet distinct influx by settlers drawn to America's first anarchist, philosopher Josiah Warren (also in 1847). Researchers conclude all three settlement influxes at the site were communitarian in nature.

Warren departed Utopia in 1850 after judging the project a success. The final labor-capital system of business transactions were made there in the 1870s; which, "by that time, the community was little more than a small village, with a store ... vineyard and fruit distillery" (pp. 23–24). In the period's volume of planned communities across America, Utopia stands out for its multiple settlement patterns and growth overtime; feeding into the present, although without much of its earlier anarchist format. The primitive socialist life at Utopia was later made into a musical at the Carnegie Center of Columbia Tusculum.

=== Civil War and post-war history ===
In 1847, future Ohio Governor John M. Pattison was born near Owensville. Long after being a Clermont resident, Ulysses Grant became commander-in-chief of the U.S. Army in the Civil War, during which John Hunt Morgan and his Confederate raiders invaded Clermont in 1863; and Grant was elected the eighteenth president (and second Republican) in 1868.

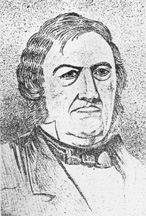
Thomas Morris, U.S. Senator

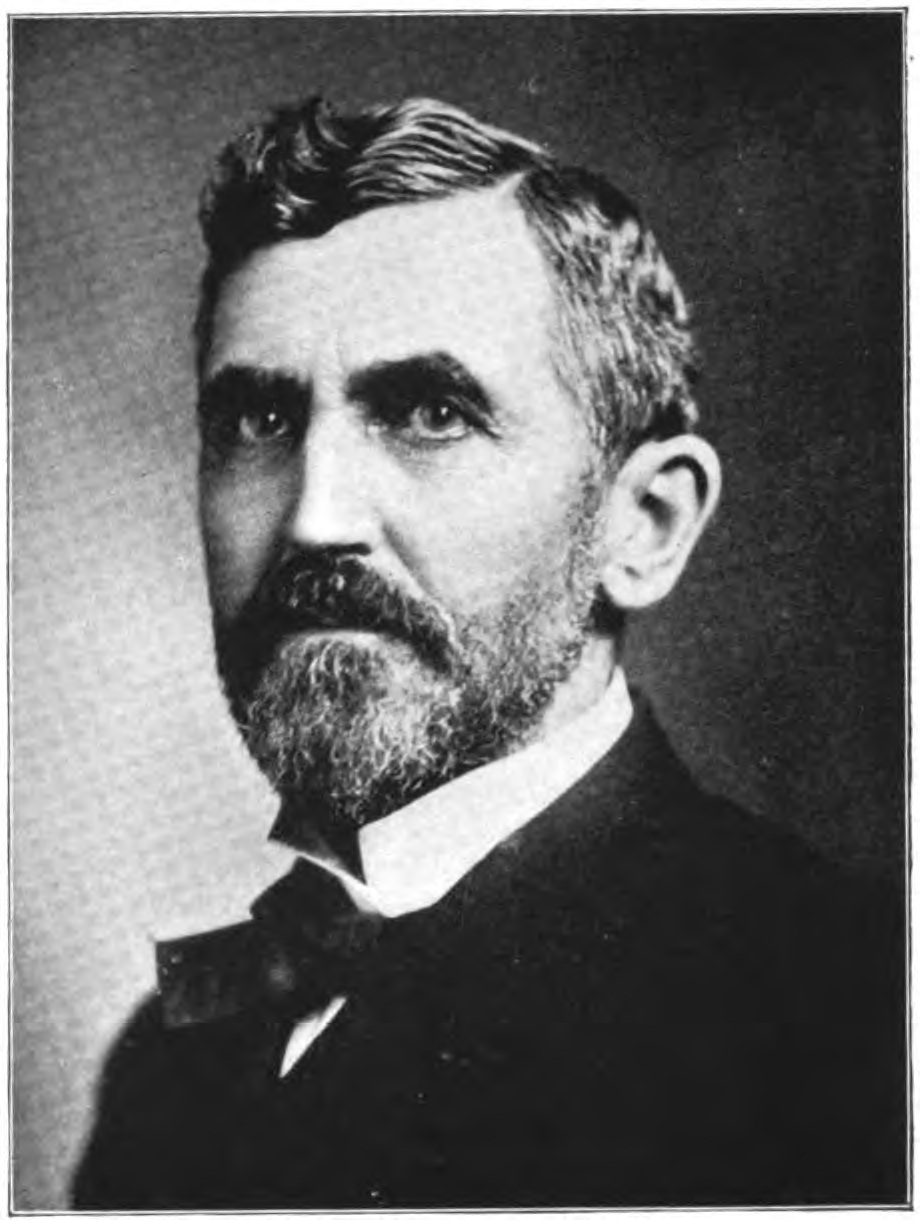
John Pattison, Governor

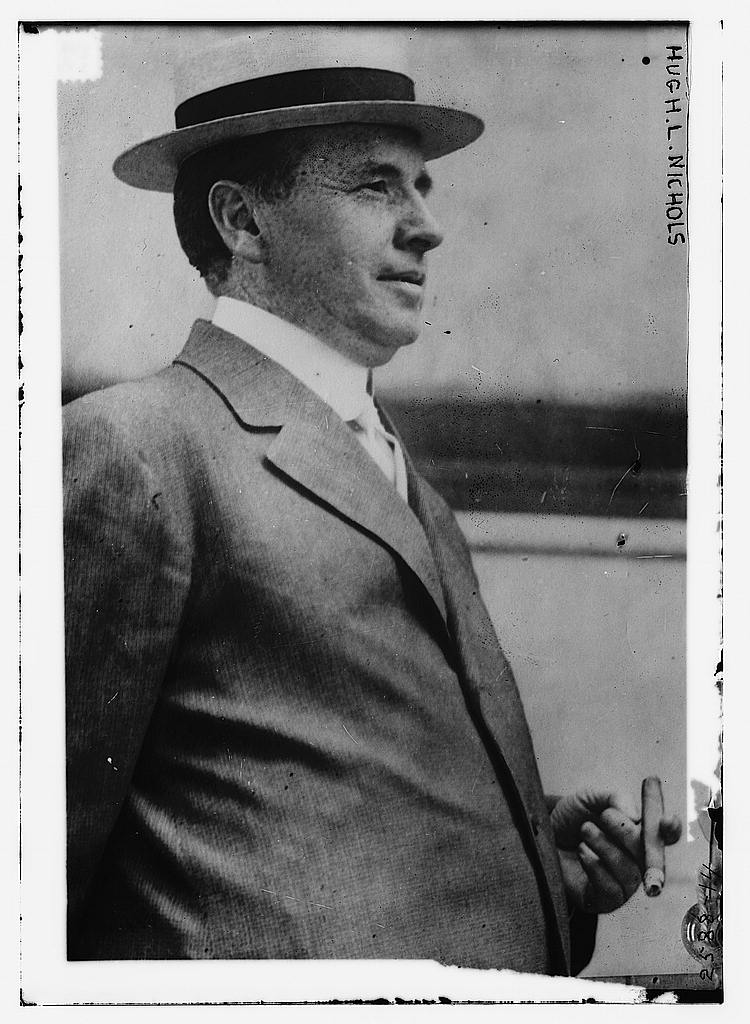
Hugh Nichols, Lt. Governor and Chief Justice

Clermont's last-standing covered bridge was built in 1878 on Stonelick Williams Corner Road, near US Route 50; it was renovated in 2014. The Grant birthplace, originally a one-room cabin, continues to welcome visitors and in 1890 was removed from its original location, travelling by boat to be viewed by citizens along various waterways. It was also taken to the 1893 Chicago World's Fair before returning to Clermont.

Pattison became the first Clermont Countian elected Governor of Ohio in 1905, Ohio's first Democratic governor of the twentieth century. Pattison lived in Milford, and at a time before the influence of Columbus, governed from his home called the Promont, which was used as the official governor's residence. The mansion, completed in 1865, today is a museum that houses a library and other historical memorabilia. It is located at 906 Main Street, Milford. Democrat Hugh Llewellyn Nichols of Batavia served as 32nd Lieutenant Governor of Ohio and became the first Chief Justice of the Ohio Supreme Court in 1914. Orpha Gatch of Milford, the first woman elected to its school board, locally sponsored the county LWV, and is the namesake for the club's award given annually at its suffragist brunch honoring the recognized volunteerism and leadership qualities. Clermont's progressivism created a climate of political independence. Despite recent Republican prevalence in its offices, heavy nonpartisan and union influences exist. Clermont's growing population as well as environmentalism have contributed to this climate.

== Geography ==
According to the United States Census Bureau, the county has a total area of 460 square miles (1,200 km^{2}), of which 452 square miles (1,170 km^{2}) is land and 7.7 square miles (20 km^{2}) (1.7%) is water.

=== Adjacent counties ===
- Brown County (east)
- Bracken County, Kentucky (south)
- Pendleton County, Kentucky (southwest)
- Campbell County, Kentucky (southwest)
- Hamilton County (west)
- Warren County (north)
- Clinton County (north east)

== Demographics ==
Historical population
Census	Pop.	Note	%±
1810	9,965		—
1820	15,820		58.8%
1830	20,466		29.4%
1840	23,106		12.9%
1850	30,455		31.8%
1860	33,034		8.5%
1870	34,268		3.7%
1880	36,713		7.1%
1890	33,553		−8.6%
1900	31,610		−5.8%
1910	29,551		−6.5%
1920	28,291		−4.3%
1930	29,786		5.3%
1940	34,109		14.5%
1950	42,182		23.7%
1960	80,530		90.9%
1970	95,725		18.9%
1980	128,483		34.2%
1990	150,187		16.9%
2000	177,977		18.5%
2010	197,363		10.9%
2020	208,601		5.7%
2025 (est.)	216,977	▲	4.0%
U.S. Decennial Census; 1790–1960 1900–1990; 1990–2000 2010-2020

=== 2020 census ===
As of the 2020 census, the county had a population of 208,601. The median age was 40.7 years. 22.9% of residents were under the age of 18 and 17.5% of residents were 65 years of age or older. For every 100 females there were 97.0 males, and for every 100 females age 18 and over there were 95.0 males age 18 and over.

The racial makeup of the county was 90.6% White, 1.6% Black or African American, 0.2% American Indian and Alaska Native, 1.2% Asian, <0.1% Native Hawaiian and Pacific Islander, 0.9% from some other race, and 5.4% from two or more races. Hispanic or Latino residents of any race comprised 2.4% of the population.

73.7% of residents lived in urban areas, while 26.3% lived in rural areas.

There were 81,944 households in the county, of which 30.8% had children under the age of 18 living in them. Of all households, 52.0% were married-couple households, 16.8% were households with a male householder and no spouse or partner present, and 23.4% were households with a female householder and no spouse or partner present. About 25.2% of all households were made up of individuals and 10.8% had someone living alone who was 65 years of age or older.

There were 86,363 housing units, of which 5.1% were vacant. Among occupied housing units, 72.8% were owner-occupied and 27.2% were renter-occupied. The homeowner vacancy rate was 1.1% and the rental vacancy rate was 6.3%.

=== Racial and ethnic composition ===
Clermont County, Ohio – Racial and ethnic composition Note: the US Census treats Hispanic/Latino as an ethnic category. This table excludes Latinos from the racial categories and assigns them to a separate category. Hispanics/Latinos may be of any race.
Race / ethnicity (NH = Non-Hispanic)	Pop 1980	Pop 1990	Pop 2000	Pop 2010	Pop 2020	% 1980	% 1990	% 2000	% 2010	% 2020
White alone (NH)	126,452	147,494	171,858	187,331	187,749	98.42%	98.21%	96.56%	94.92%	90.00%
Black or African American alone (NH)	914	1,274	1,602	2,234	3,245	0.71%	0.85%	0.90%	1.13%	1.56%
Native American or Alaska Native alone (NH)	118	214	313	349	345	0.09%	0.14%	0.18%	0.18%	0.17%
Asian alone (NH)	324	450	1,120	1,900	2,529	0.25%	0.30%	0.63%	0.96%	1.21%
Native Hawaiian or Pacific Islander alone (NH)	x	x	24	58	58	x	x	0.01%	0.03%	0.03%
Other race alone (NH)	89	34	128	189	611	0.07%	0.02%	0.07%	0.10%	0.29%
Mixed race or Multiracial (NH)	x	x	1,385	2,406	9,108	x	x	0.78%	1.22%	4.37%
Hispanic or Latino (any race)	586	721	1,547	2,896	4,956	0.46%	0.48%	0.87%	1.47%	2.38%
Total	128,483	150,187	177,977	197,363	208,601	100.00%	100.00%	100.00%	100.00%	100.00%

=== 2010 census ===
As of the census of 2010, there were 197,363 people, 74,828 households, and 53,800 families residing in the county. The population density was 436.5 inhabitants per square mile (168.5/km^{2}). There were 80,656 housing units at an average density of 178.4 per square mile (68.9/km^{2}). The racial makeup of the county was 95.9% white, 1.2% black or African American, 1.0% Asian, 0.2% American Indian, 0.4% from other races, and 1.3% from two or more races. Those of Hispanic or Latino origin made up 1.5% of the population. In terms of ancestry, 34.0% were German, 18.1% were Irish, 12.0% were American, and 11.1% were English.

Of the 74,828 households, 35.9% had children under the age of 18 living with them, 56.1% were married couples living together, 10.9% had a female householder with no husband present, 28.1% were non-families, and 22.5% of all households were made up of individuals. The average household size was 2.61 and the average family size was 3.06. The median age was 38.5 years.

The median income for a household in the county was $58,472 and the median income for a family was $68,485. Males had a median income of $50,204 versus $36,746 for females. The per capita income for the county was $27,900. About 6.9% of families and 9.3% of the population were below the poverty line, including 12.6% of those under age 18 and 5.5% of those age 65 or over.

=== 2000 census ===
As of the census of 2000, there were 177,977 people, 66,013 households, and 49,047 families residing in the county. The population density was 394 inhabitants per square mile (152/km^{2}). There were 69,226 housing units at an average density of 153 per square mile (59/km^{2}). The racial makeup of the county was 97.13% White, 0.91% African American, 0.19% Native American, 0.63% Asian, 0.02% Pacific Islander, 0.26% from other races, and 0.86% from two or more races. 0.87% of the population were Hispanic or Latino of any race. 32.7% were of German, 16.7% American, 12.0% Irish and 11.0% English ancestry.

There were 66,013 households, out of which 38.10% had children under the age of 18 living with them, 60.40% were married couples living together, 10.00% had a female householder with no husband present, and 25.70% were non-families. 21.00% of all households were made up of individuals, and 7.00% had someone living alone who was 65 years of age or older. The average household size was 2.67 and the average family size was 3.11.

In the county the population was spread out, with 27.90% under the age of 18, 8.40% from 18 to 24, 31.70% from 25 to 44, 22.60% from 45 to 64, and 9.40% who were 65 years of age or older. The median age was 35 years. For every 100 females there were 96.40 males. For every 100 females age 18 and over, there were 93.60 males.

The median income for a household in the county was $49,386, and the median income for a family was $57,032. Males had a median income of $40,739 versus $27,613 for females. The per capita income for the county was $22,370. About 5.30% of families and 7.10% of the population were below the poverty line, including 8.70% of those under age 18 and 7.90% of those age 65 or over.

== Economy ==
According to the county's 2021 Annual Comprehensive Financial Report, the top employers in the county are:

#	Employer	# of Employees	Location
1	Total Quality Logistics	2,000	Union Township
2	American Modern Insurance Group	1,207	Batavia Township
3	Clermont County	1,152	Batavia
4	Mercy Hospital - Clermont Hospital	850	Batavia Township
5	West Clermont Local School District	835	Union Township
6	Milford Exempted Village School District	767	Miami Township
7	Siemens Digital Industries Software	750	Miami Township
8	Milacron	662	Williamsburg Township
9	L3 Harris Fuzing & Ordnance Systems	607	Withamsville
10	Huhtamaki, Inc.	500	Batavia Township

== Education ==
=== High schools ===
These buildings may not have been high schools when they were first constructed, but have since become high schools. The building years listed connote the current buildings' initial openings and do not include renovations or additions.

- (1957) Clermont Northeastern High School, 5327 Hutchinson Road, Batavia
- (1963) Milford High School, One Eagles Way, Milford
- (1965) New Richmond High School, 1131 Bethel-New Richmond Road, New Richmond
- (1996) Williamsburg High School, 500 South Fifth Street, Williamsburg
- (1997) Batavia High School, One Bulldog Place, Batavia
- (2002) Bethel-Tate High School, 3420 Ohio Rt. 125, Bethel
- (2002) Goshen High School, 6707 Goshen Road, Goshen
- (2004) Felicity-Franklin High School, 105 Market Street, Felicity
- (2017) West Clermont High School, 4101 Bach Buxton Rd, Batavia

=== Colleges ===
- (1972) Clermont College, 4200 Clermont College Drive, Batavia

== Media ==
In the 1800s, the Clermont Sun was started as the Democratic newspaper and the Clermont Courier was started as the Whig/GOP newspaper. Organized reporting that covers Clermont today are the Cincinnati Enquirer, Loveland Magazine, Clermont Sun, Watchdog Wire, Eastside Press, and discount periodicals about the eastside of Greater Cincinnati.

== Transportation ==
=== Airports ===
The Clermont County Airport is located two nautical miles (2.3 mi; 3.7 km) west of Batavia's central business district.

=== Major highways ===
- I-275
- US 50
- US 52
- SR 28
- SR 32
- SR 48
- SR 125
- SR 126
- SR 131
- SR 132
- SR 133
- SR 222
- SR 232
- SR 276
- SR 286
- SR 727
- SR 743
- SR 749
- SR 756
- SR 774

== Parks and libraries ==
Clermont County has the Cincinnati Nature Center at Rowe Woods and Valley View Nature Preserve, both in Milford, and oversees five parks, three nature preserves, a hiking/biking trail, and several green spaces, encompassing over six-hundred acres. Clermont is the location of East Fork State Park and Stonelick State Park, and benefits from the Clermont Public Libraries.

== Politics ==
All of Clermont's elected officeholders, including judges, are members of the Republican Party.

=== U.S. House of Representatives ===
Clermont's congressional seat is occupied by David Taylor, who resides in Amelia, Clermont County, Ohio.

=== Elected Commission ===
The three seats of the Clermont Commission are occupied by Bonnie Batchler, last elected 2024; David Painter, last elected 2024; and Claire B. Corcoran. The commission employs an administrator, Thomas Eigel (as of 2020), to run day-to-day operations of Clermont.

=== Ohio Statehouse ===
Encompassing all of Clermont, the 14th Ohio Senate seat is occupied by Terry Johnson, last elected 2020. Covering northern Clermont, the 65th statehouse seat is occupied by Jean Schmidt, last elected 2020. Covering southern Clermont, the 66th statehouse seat is occupied by Adam Bird, last elected 2020.

=== Elected Officers ===
Clermont's elected officers include Debbie Clepper, Recorder; Mark J. Tekulve, Prosecutor; Linda Fraley, Auditor; Christopher E. Stratton, Sheriff; Jeremy Evans, Engineer; Paul Kamphaus, Municipal Clerk of Courts; Brian Treon, Coroner; Jeannie Zurmehly, Treasurer; and Barbara Wiedenbein, Common Pleas Clerk of Courts.

=== Elected Judges ===
The elected Common Pleas Court is occupied by Judge Richard Ferenc, Judge Victor Haddad, Judge Anthony W. Brock, and Judge Kevin Miles. The elected Common Pleas Domestic Relations Court is occupied by Judge Mary Lynne Birck. The elected Municipal Court is occupied by Judge Jesse Kramig, Judge Jason E. Nagel, and Judge Anita M. Bechmann. The elected Probate/Juvenile Court is occupied by Judge James A. Shriver.

=== National outcomes ===
From 1804 to 1860, Clermont County majorities voted for the Democratic nominees for president. In 1864, Clermont voted for the Union ticket dedicated to preserving the Union. Clermont only voted Republican three times between 1864 and 1912. The county was a bellwether from 1912 to 1936. Starting with the 1940 election, it has become more Republican-leaning, with Lyndon B. Johnson being the lone Democrat to win since. Clermont has been visited by recent national ticket candidates from Republicans and Democrats.

United States presidential election results for Clermont County, Ohio
Year	Republican		Democratic		Third party(ies)	
Year	No.	%	No.	%	No.	%
1856	2,188	38.32%	2,741	48.00%	781	13.68%
1860	2,965	46.06%	3,206	49.81%	266	4.13%
1864	3,316	50.02%	3,314	49.98%	0	0.00%
1868	3,475	49.16%	3,594	50.84%	0	0.00%
1872	3,408	48.20%	3,658	51.73%	5	0.07%
1876	3,848	47.06%	4,315	52.77%	14	0.17%
1880	4,028	46.31%	4,417	50.79%	252	2.90%
1884	4,242	49.26%	4,193	48.69%	177	2.06%
1888	4,097	48.17%	4,180	49.15%	228	2.68%
1892	3,715	45.92%	4,069	50.29%	307	3.79%
1896	4,272	47.36%	4,672	51.80%	76	0.84%
1900	3,990	47.43%	4,244	50.45%	178	2.12%
1904	4,207	53.77%	3,339	42.68%	278	3.55%
1908	4,137	48.91%	4,150	49.07%	171	2.02%
1912	2,543	33.47%	3,610	47.52%	1,444	19.01%
1916	3,549	44.76%	4,247	53.56%	133	1.68%
1920	6,857	51.91%	6,245	47.27%	108	0.82%
1924	6,867	55.18%	4,544	36.51%	1,034	8.31%
1928	9,732	69.60%	4,194	29.99%	57	0.41%
1932	7,684	46.10%	8,662	51.97%	321	1.93%
1936	7,608	44.05%	9,204	53.29%	458	2.65%
1940	9,367	51.16%	8,942	48.84%	0	0.00%
1944	9,125	53.48%	7,937	46.52%	0	0.00%
1948	8,592	50.88%	8,224	48.70%	71	0.42%
1952	13,221	57.68%	9,702	42.32%	0	0.00%
1956	14,914	62.30%	9,026	37.70%	0	0.00%
1960	18,802	61.60%	11,723	38.40%	0	0.00%
1964	13,367	44.72%	16,523	55.28%	0	0.00%
1968	15,299	48.04%	8,859	27.82%	7,691	24.15%
1972	22,936	71.70%	8,276	25.87%	777	2.43%
1976	19,616	55.99%	14,850	42.38%	571	1.63%
1980	26,674	63.37%	13,199	31.36%	2,218	5.27%
1984	35,316	74.63%	11,713	24.75%	290	0.61%
1988	37,417	70.49%	15,352	28.92%	316	0.60%
1992	32,065	49.99%	17,558	27.37%	14,519	22.64%
1996	36,457	56.81%	21,329	33.24%	6,388	9.95%
2000	47,129	67.45%	20,927	29.95%	1,821	2.61%
2004	62,949	70.67%	25,887	29.06%	243	0.27%
2008	62,559	65.35%	31,611	33.02%	1,564	1.63%
2012	64,208	66.52%	30,458	31.55%	1,859	1.93%
2016	67,518	67.54%	26,715	26.72%	5,739	5.74%
2020	74,570	67.36%	34,092	30.79%	2,048	1.85%
2024	76,964	67.11%	36,130	31.50%	1,589	1.39%

United States Senate election results for Clermont County, Ohio1
Year	Republican		Democratic		Third party(ies)	
Year	No.	%	No.	%	No.	%
2024	70,592	62.43%	37,825	33.45%	4,649	4.11%

== Communities ==
Ohio recognizes municipalities (villages and cities) and townships.

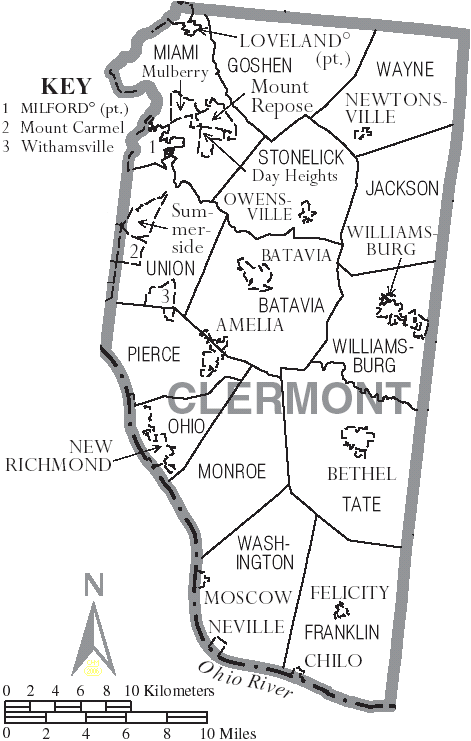
Map of Clermont County, Ohio With Municipal and Township Labels

Each municipality has an elected-nonpartisan council with a designated mayor. Mayors sometimes preside during mayor's court and have various other roles. These mayor-council arrangements pass municipal ordinances.

In 1991, the state legislature and George Voinovich adopted "Limited Home Rule Townships" as a schism from the Ohio Constitution's Municipal Home Rule established in 1912. The alteration devolved townships which chose limited home rule government to be similar to municipalities but without full home rule, a city code, comprehensive zoning, among a host of other traits. The result is many developed townships which would have sought shared municipal incorporation with cities or villages have not maximized property value and do not have basic support for services and infrastructure, relying exclusively on reduced state funding—much of which comes from federal investments for roadwork. The autonomy which was sought has effectively been unable to reserve responsibility for the community and instead outsourced that responsibility to state intervention.

=== Cities ===
- Loveland (partly in Hamilton and Warren Counties)
- Milford (partly in Hamilton County)

=== Villages ===
- Batavia (county seat)
- Bethel
- Chilo
- Felicity
- Moscow
- Neville
- New Richmond
- Owensville
- Williamsburg

Dissolved villages

- Amelia
- Newtonsville

=== Townships ===
- Batavia
- Franklin
- Goshen
- Jackson
- Miami
- Monroe
- Ohio
- Pierce
- Stonelick
- Tate
- Union
- Washington
- Wayne
- Williamsburg

=== Census-designated places ===
- Amelia
- Day Heights
- Goshen
- Marathon
- Miamiville
- Mount Carmel
- Mount Repose
- Mulberry
- Summerside
- Withamsville

=== Unincorporated communities ===
- Afton
- Bantam
- Belfast
- Blairsville
- Blowville
- Branch Hill
- Braziers
- Cedron
- Clermontville
- Clover
- Concord
- Edenton
- Elk Lick
- Glen Este
- Grailville
- Hamlet
- Hennings Mill
- Hills
- Laurel
- Lerado
- Lindale
- Locust Corner
- Maple
- Milford Hills
- Modest
- Monterey
- Moores Fork
- Mount Holly
- Mount Olive
- Mount Pisgah
- New Palestine
- Ninemile
- Nineveh
- Nicholsville
- Olive Branch
- Perintown
- Point Isabel
- Point Pleasant
- Pringle Corner
- Round Bottom
- Rural
- Saltair
- Simpkinsville
- Shiloh
- Springvale
- Stonelick
- Tobasco
- Utopia
- Wards Corner
- Wiggonsville
- Williams Corner
- Willowville
- Woodville

== Gallery ==
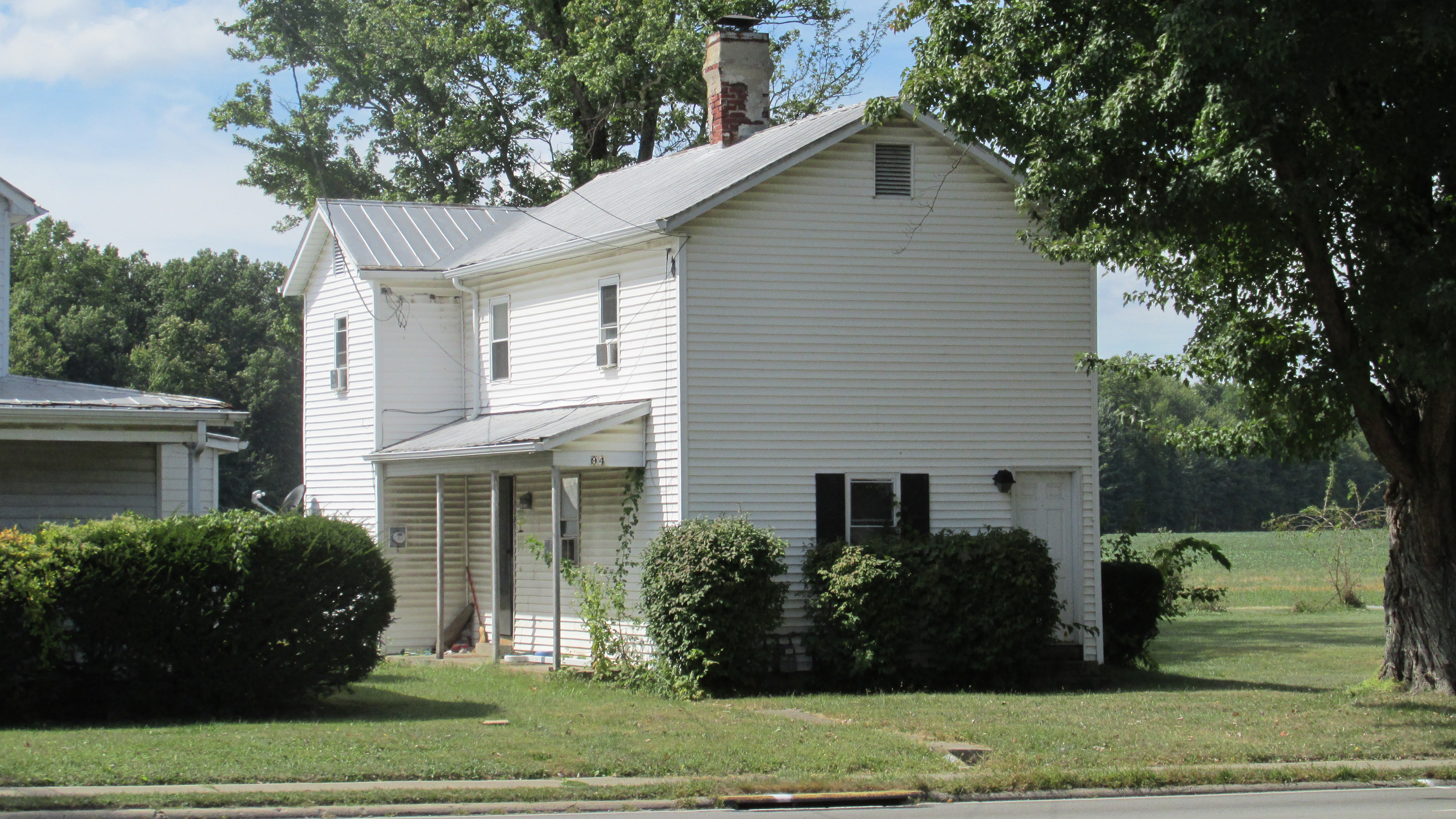
Amelia Bowdoin's House in Amelia

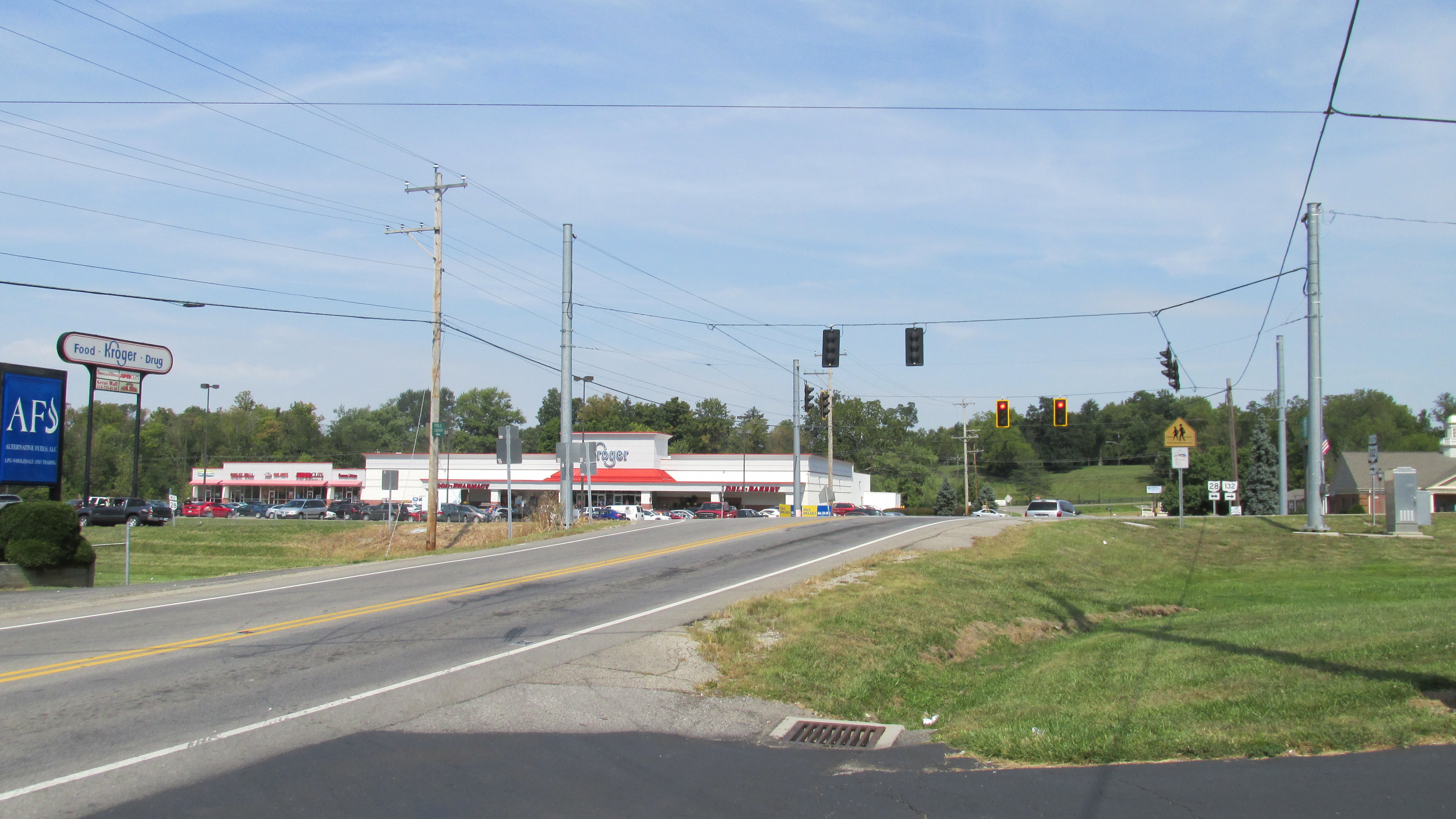
Goshen at Ohio Rt. 132

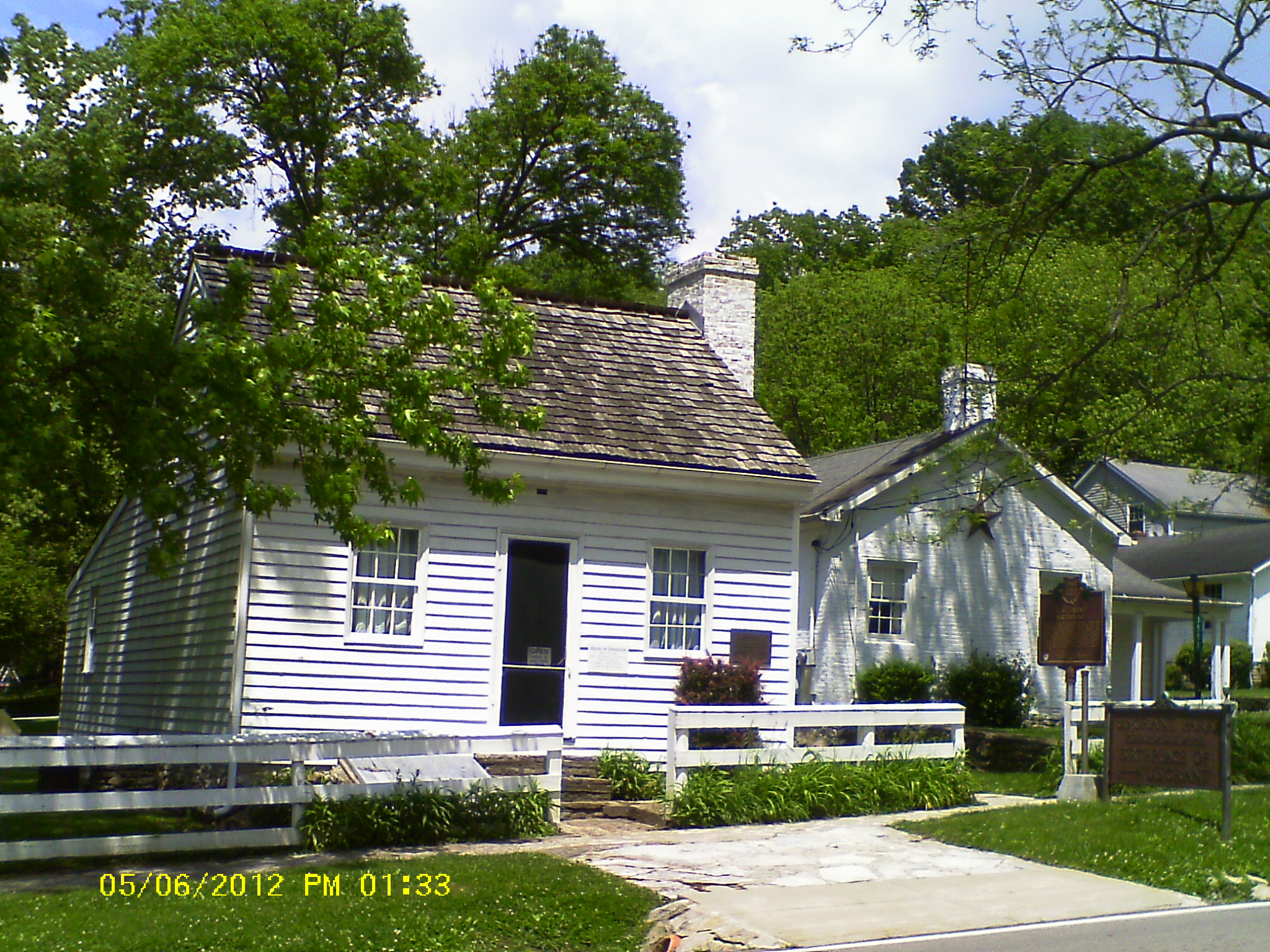
U.S. Grant's Birthplace at Point Pleasant

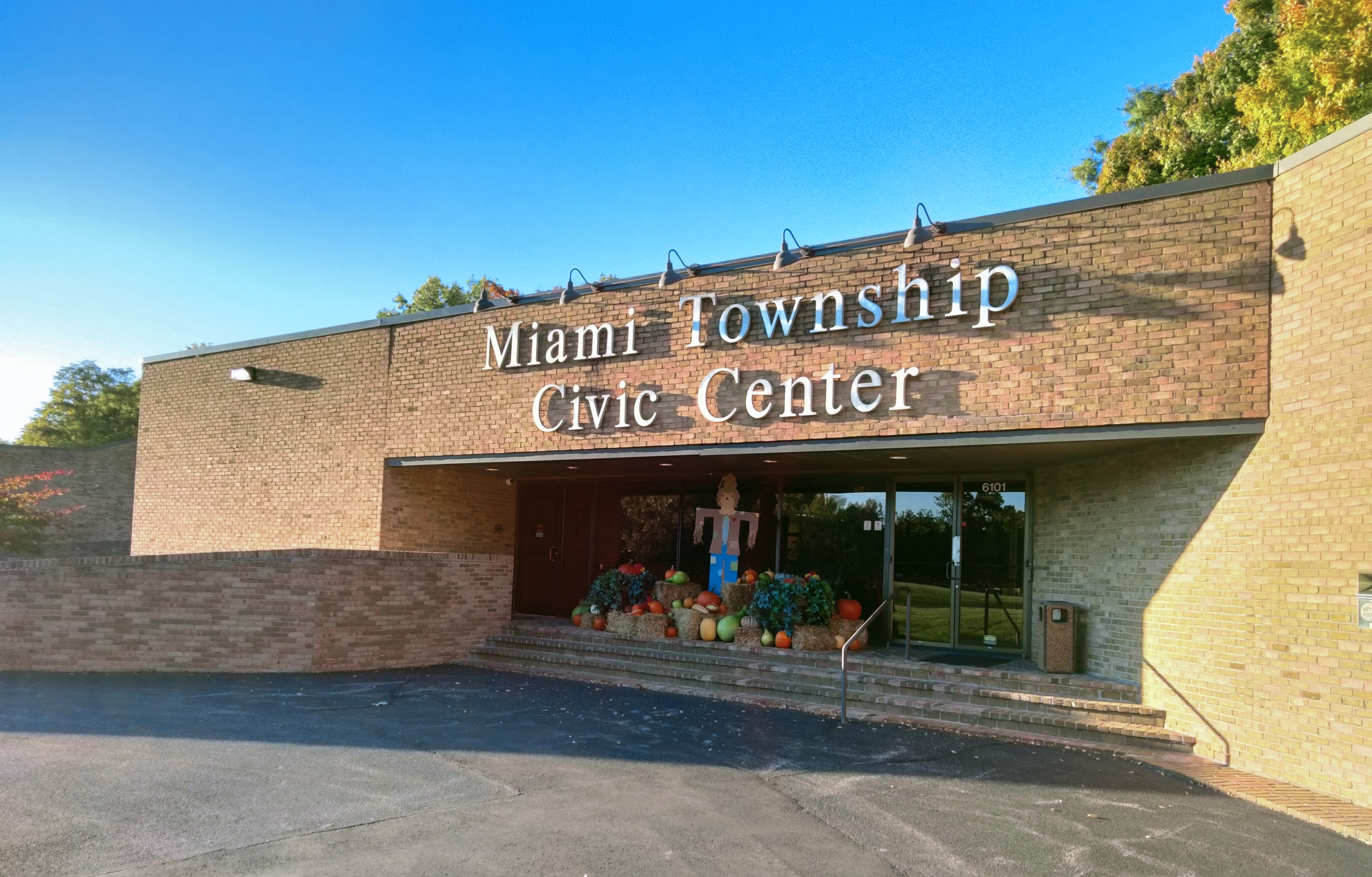
Miami Township Civic Center on Meijer Drive

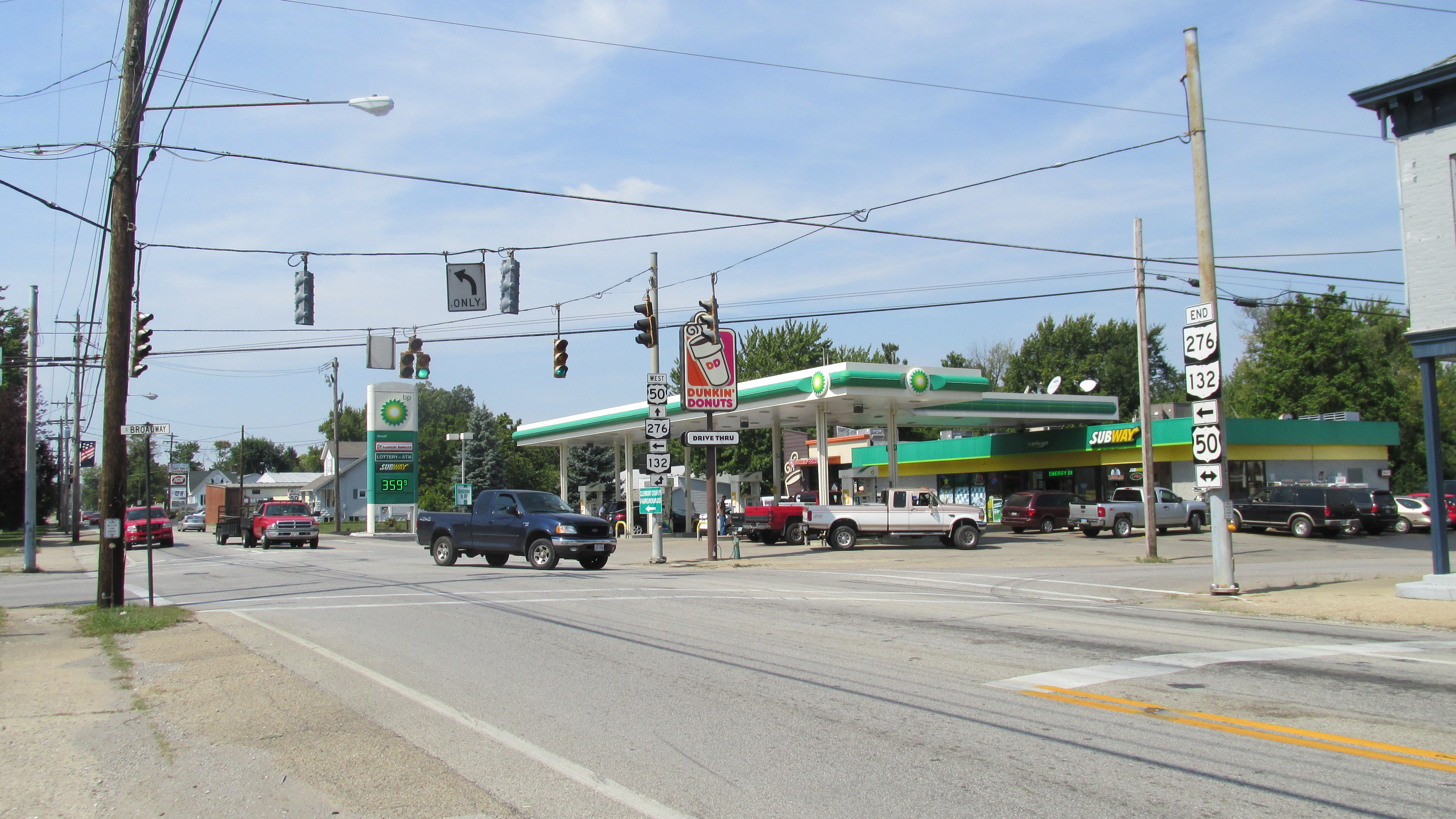
Main Owensville intersection at US Rt. 50 and Ohio Rt. 132

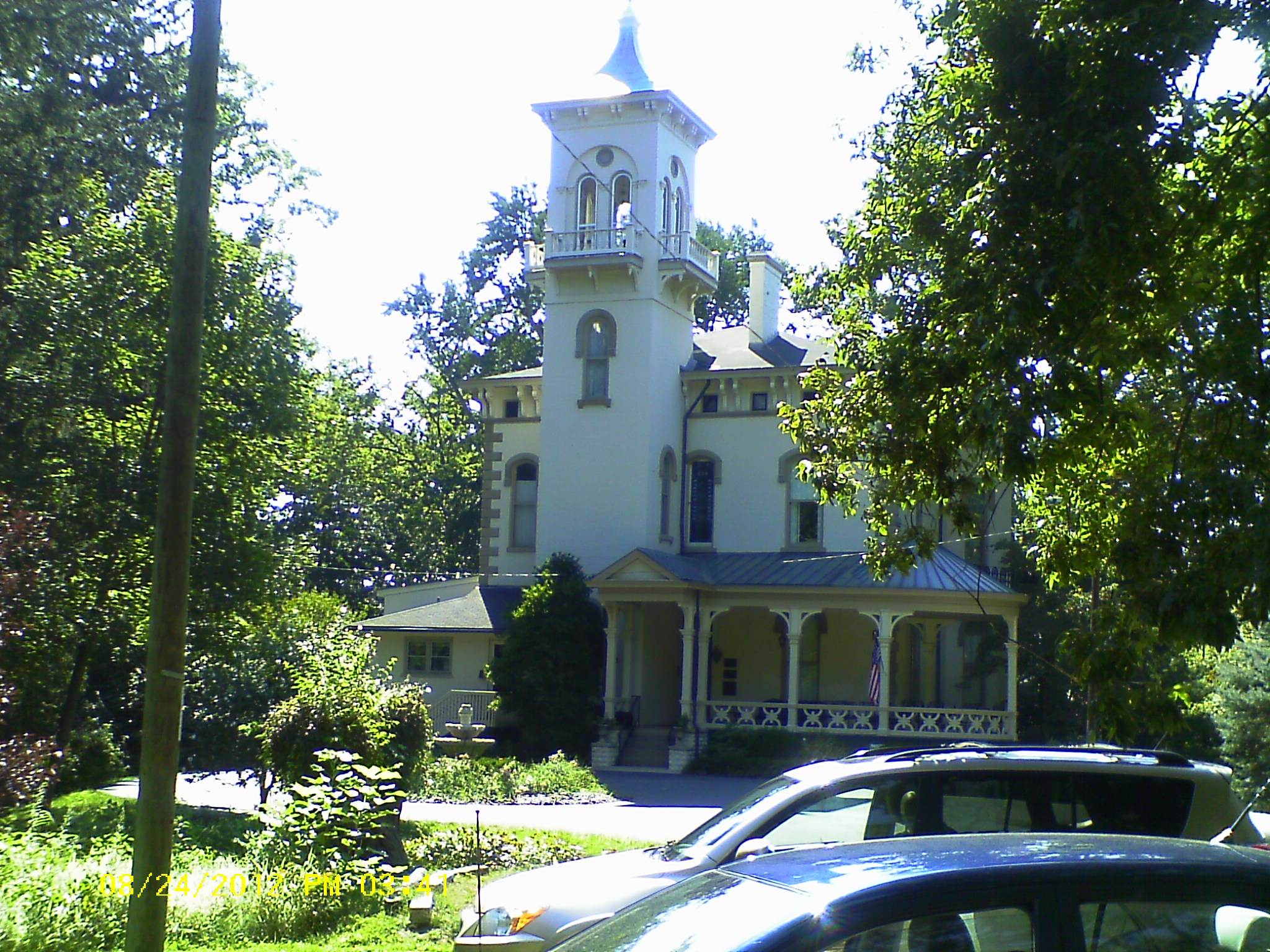
The Promont in Milford

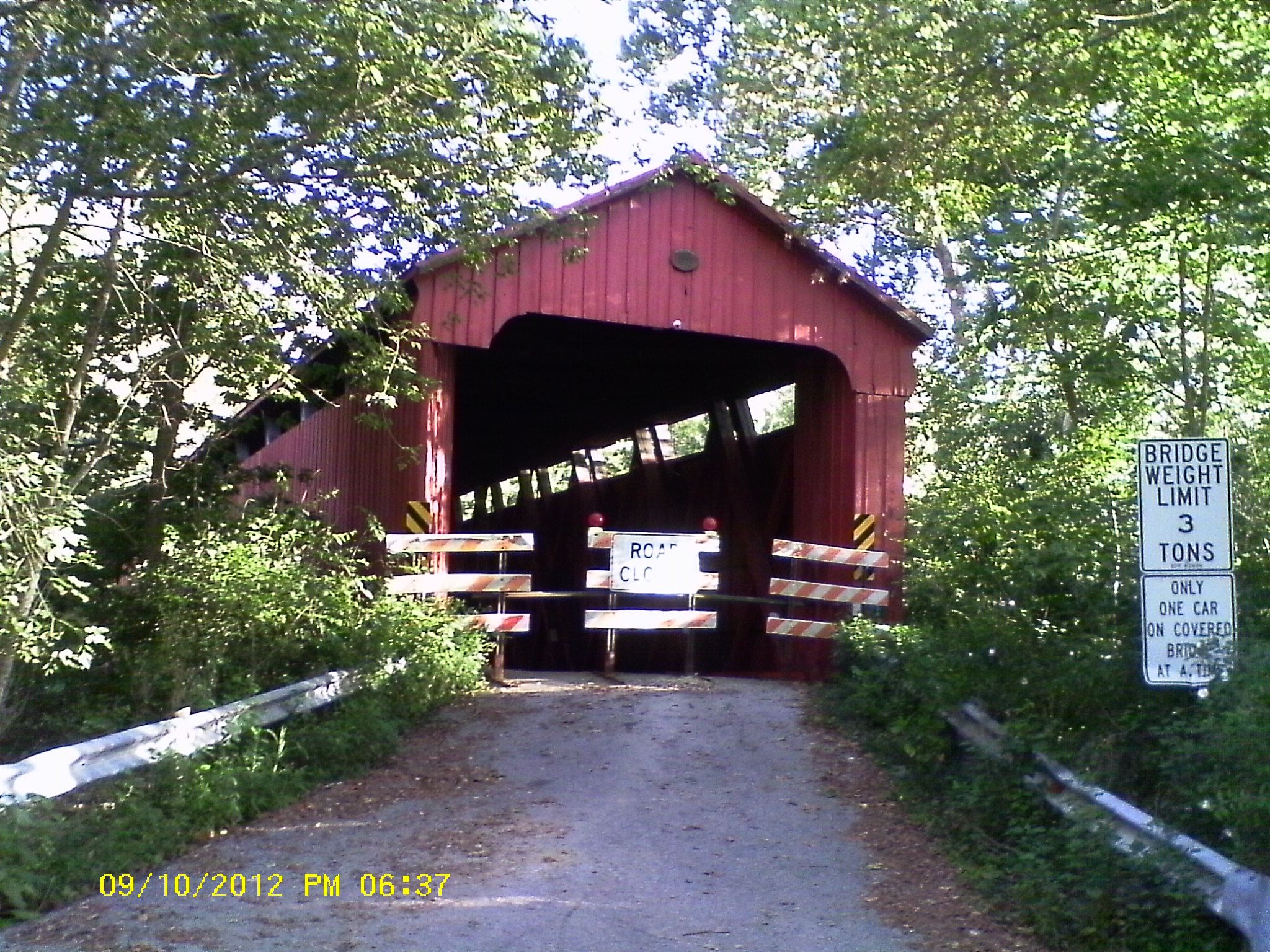
Stonelick-Williams Corner Covered Bridge near Owensville

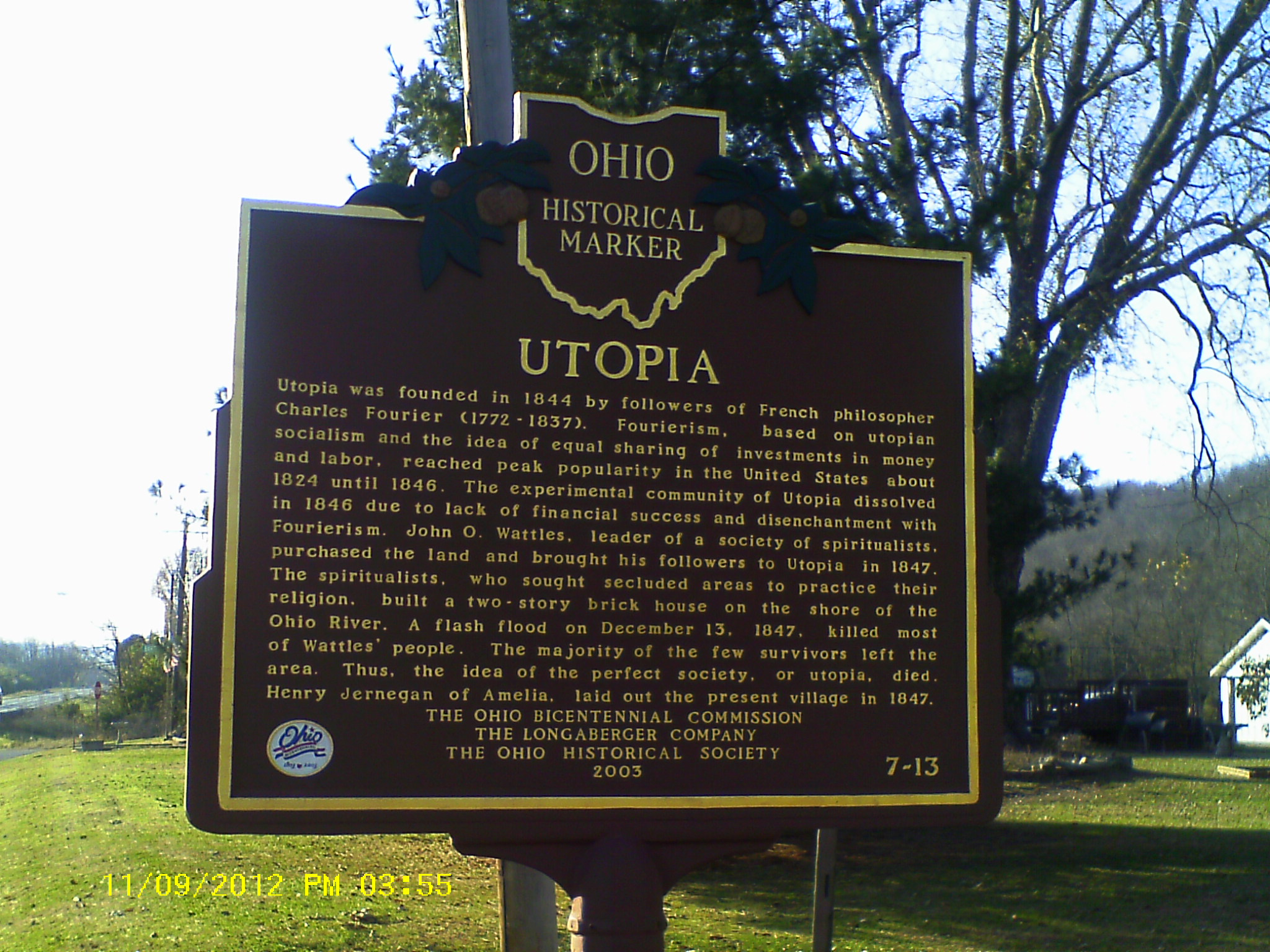
Utopia marker on US Rt. 52

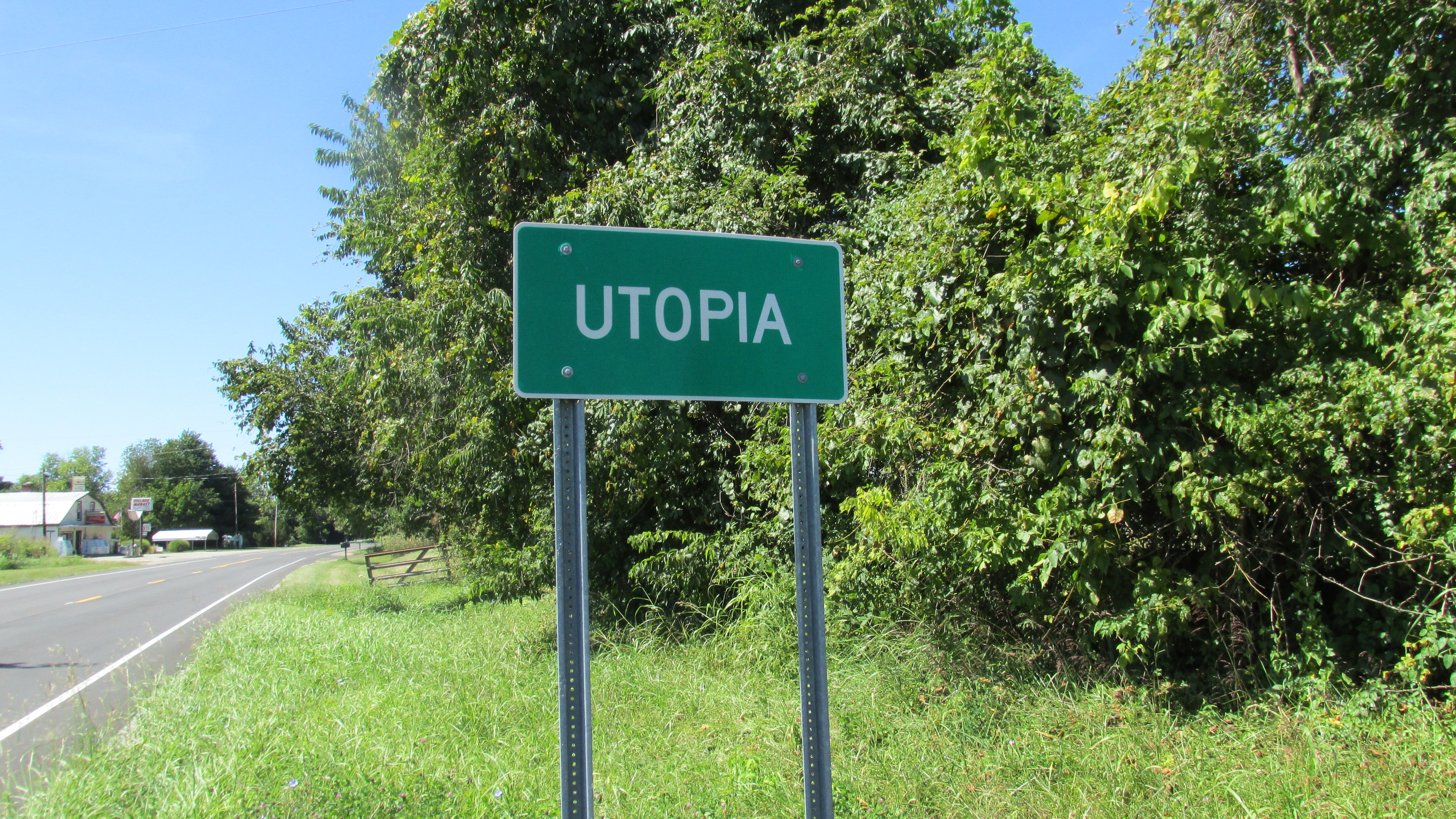
Utopia sign

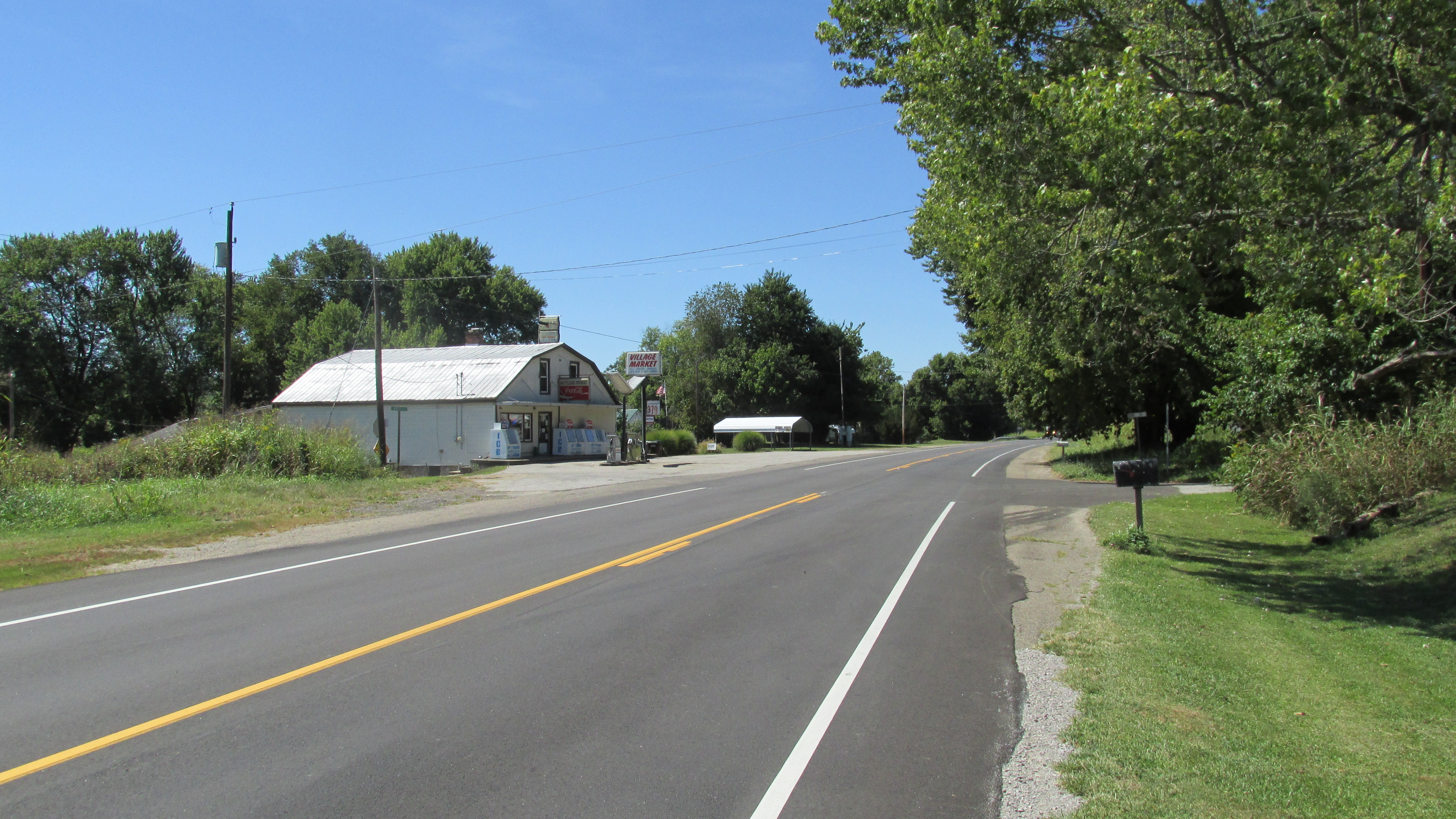
Utopia, west on US Rt. 52

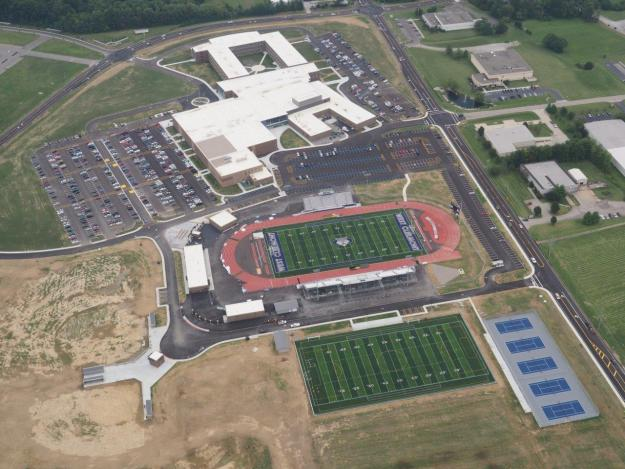
West Clermont High School aerial view

== See also ==
- National Register of Historic Places listings in Clermont County, Ohio
