= Saint-Exupéry =

Saint-Exupéry may refer to:

== People ==
- Antoine de Saint-Exupéry, aviation pioneer and writer, author of The Little Prince
- Consuelo de Saint-Exupéry, writer, artist, and wife of Antoine de Saint-Exupéry
- Marie-Madeleine de Saint-Exupéry (1897–1927), writer, sister of Antoine de Saint-Exupéry
- Simone de Saint-Exupéry (1898–1978), writer, sister of Antoine de Saint-Exupéry
- Saint Exuperius, early fifth-century bishop of Toulouse

== Other ==
- Saint-Exupéry (2024), a biographical film directed by Pablo Agüero.
- 2578 Saint-Exupéry, asteroid named in honour of Antoine de Saint-Exupéry
- Aguja Saint Exupery, mountain in Patagonia, Argentina, named in honour of Antoine de Saint-Exupéry
- Château Malescot St. Exupéry, Bordeaux wine producer archaically named simply St.-Exupéry
- Lyon-Saint Exupéry Airport (formerly Satolas), Lyon, France, named in honour of Antoine de Saint-Exupéry
  - Gare de Lyon Saint-Exupéry (formerly Gare de Satolas), the high-speed railway station located at the airport
- Saint-Exupéry, Gironde, commune of the Gironde département, in France
- A novel about Antoine de Saint-Exupéry by Alyson Richman
- ex-Saint Exupéry, alternative name for the Firebird Stradivarius
