= SS Athenia (1922) =

British passenger liner sunk in WWII

Coordinates: 56°44′N 14°5′W

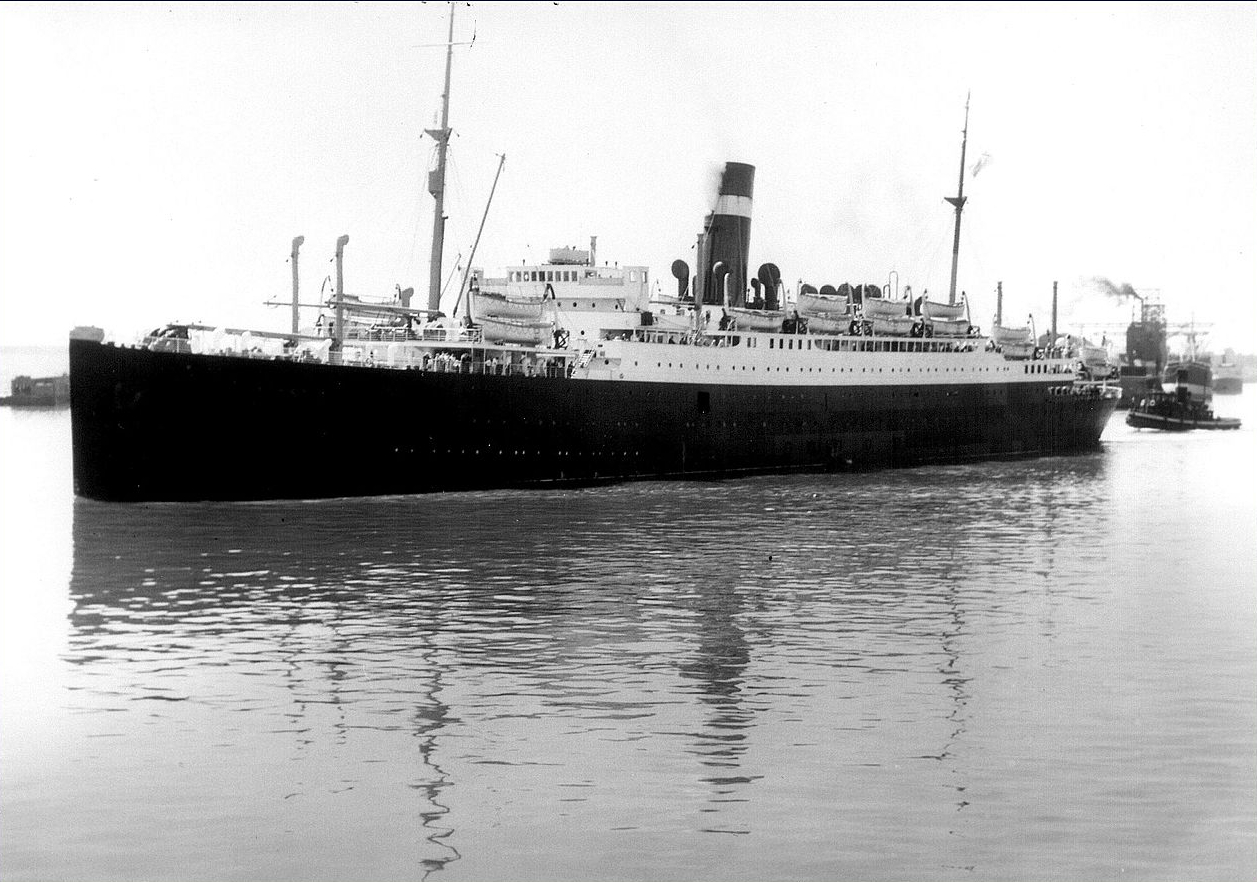
- Athenia in Montreal Harbour in 1933

History

United Kingdom
- Name: Athenia
- Namesake: Athena
- Owner: Anchor-Donaldson Line (1923–1935); Donaldson Atlantic Line (1935–1939)
- Port of registry: (United Kingdom) Glasgow
- Builder: Fairfield SB & Eng Co, Govan
- Yard number: 596
- Launched: 28 January 1922
- Completed: 19 April 1923
- Identification: UK official number 146330; code letters KNRT (until 1933); Call sign GFDM (from 1934)
- Fate: Sunk 3 September 1939
- Notes: First ship of the British Empire sunk by Germany in World War II

General characteristics
- Type: Ocean liner
- Tonnage: 13,465 GRT; tonnage under deck 10,200; 8,118 NRT
- Length: 526.3 ft (160.4 m) p/p
- Beam: 66.4 ft (20.2 m)
- Depth: 38.1 ft (11.6 m)
- Decks: 3
- Propulsion: 6 × steam turbines; twin screws
- Speed: 15 knots (28 km/h; 17 mph)
- Capacity: As built 516 cabin class, 1,000 3rd class
- Sensors & processing systems: wireless direction finding (by 1930); echo sounding device (by 1934); gyrocompass (by 1934)
- Notes: sister ship: Letitia

SS Athenia was a steam turbine transatlantic passenger liner built in Glasgow, Scotland, in 1923 for the Anchor-Donaldson Line, which later became the Donaldson Atlantic Line. She worked between the United Kingdom and the east coast of Canada until 3 September 1939, when a torpedo from the German submarine U-30 sank her in the Western Approaches.

Athenia was the first British ship to be sunk by Germany during World War II, and the incident accounted for the Donaldson Line's greatest single loss of life at sea, with 117 civilian passengers and crew killed. The sinking was condemned as a war crime. Among those dead were 28 US citizens, causing Germany to fear that the US might join the war on the side of the British Empire and France. Wartime German authorities denied that one of their vessels had sunk the ship. An admission of responsibility did not come from Germany until 1946.

She was the second Donaldson ship of the name to be torpedoed and sunk off Inishtrahull by a German submarine. The earlier Athenia (1903) was similarly attacked and sunk in 1917.

== Construction ==
The Fairfield Shipbuilding and Engineering Company of Govan in Glasgow built Athenia, launching her on 28 January 1922 and completing her in 1923. She measured 13,465 gross register tons (GRT) and 8,118 net register tons (NRT), was 526.3 ft (160.4 m) long between perpendiculars by 66.4 ft (20.2 m) beam and had a depth of 38.1 ft (11.6 m). She had six steam turbines driving twin screws via double reduction gearing, giving her a speed of 15 knots (28 km/h; 17 mph). She had capacity for 516 cabin class passengers and 1,000 in third class. By 1930 her navigation equipment included wireless direction finding, and by 1934 this had been augmented with an echo sounding device and a gyrocompass.

== Career ==
Athenia was built for the Anchor-Donaldson Line, which was a joint venture between Anchor Line and Donaldson Line. Fairfield built a sister ship, Letitia, which was launched in October 1924 and was completed in 1925. Athenia and Letitia were the two largest ships in Donaldson's various fleets. The ships worked Anchor-Donaldson's trans-Atlantic route linking Liverpool and Glasgow with Quebec and Montreal in summer and with Halifax, Nova Scotia, in winter. After the construction of the Pier 21 immigration complex in Halifax in 1928, Athenia became a more frequent caller there, making over 100 voyages to Halifax with immigrants. In 1935, Anchor Line went into liquidation and Donaldson Line bought most of its assets. In 1936, Donaldson was reconstituted as Donaldson Atlantic Line.

== Loss ==
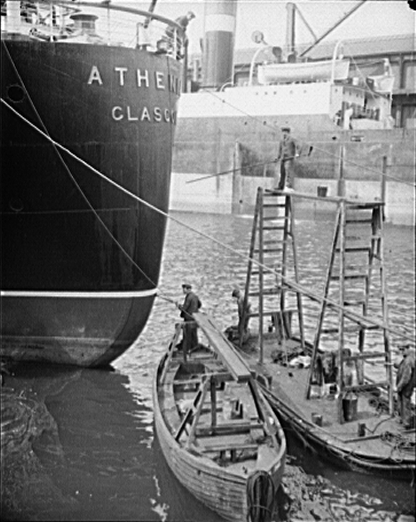
Workers painting Athenia's stern, summer 1937.

On 1 September 1939 Athenia, commanded by Captain James Cook, left Glasgow for Montreal via Liverpool and Belfast. She carried 1,103 passengers, including about 500 Jewish refugees, 469 Canadians, 311 US citizens, 72 British subjects, and 315 crew. Despite clear indications that war would break out any day, the vessel departed Liverpool at 13:00 hrs on 2 September without recall, and on the evening of the 3rd — the day of the British declaration of war on Germany — was 60 nautical miles (110 km) south of Rockall and 200 nautical miles (370 km) northwest of Inishtrahull, Ireland, when she was sighted by the German submarine U-30 commanded by Oberleutnant Fritz-Julius Lemp around 16:30. Although Lemp later claimed the ship was darkened, zigzagging, and off the normal shipping routes, the claims did not become public until years later when eyewitnesses denied them. He mistakenly concluded she was either a troopship, a Q-ship, or an armed merchant cruiser. U-30 tracked Athenia for three hours until eventually, at 19:40, when both vessels were between Rockall and Tory Island, Lemp ordered two torpedoes to be fired. One exploded on Athenia's port side in her engine room, and she began to settle by the stern. Within minutes, Lemp learned of his error by listening to radio reports, but failed to report what he had done to U-boat Headquarters until he returned to port 23 days later. Unaware of the truth, Admiral Raeder denied any U-boats were in the vicinity and Joseph Goebbels developed a false narrative. When Lemp revealed the truth to him, Karl Doenitz sent him to Berlin where he spoke to Raeder. Both he and Hitler agreed the truth about the Athenia should remain secret. Lemp's KTB (war diary) was altered by inserting a counterfeit page, which was not discovered until the time of the Nuremberg War Trials. In the interim, myths developed, the media made much of them, and rage ensued. Civilians had become early victims within hours after war was declared.

Several ships, including the E-class destroyer HMS Electra, responded to Athenia's distress signal. Electra's commander, Lt. Cdr. Sammy A. Buss, was senior officer present and took charge. He sent the F-class destroyer HMS Fame on an anti-submarine sweep of the area, while Electra, another E-class destroyer, HMS Escort, the Swedish yacht Southern Cross, the 5,749 GRT Norwegian dry cargo ship MS Knute Nelson, and the US cargo ship City of Flint, rescued survivors. Between them they saved about 981 passengers and crew. The German liner SS Bremen, en route from New York to Murmansk, also received Athenia's distress signal, but ignored it as it was trying to evade capture by the British as a prize of war. City of Flint took 223 survivors to Pier 21 at Halifax, and Knute Nelson landed 450 at Galway.

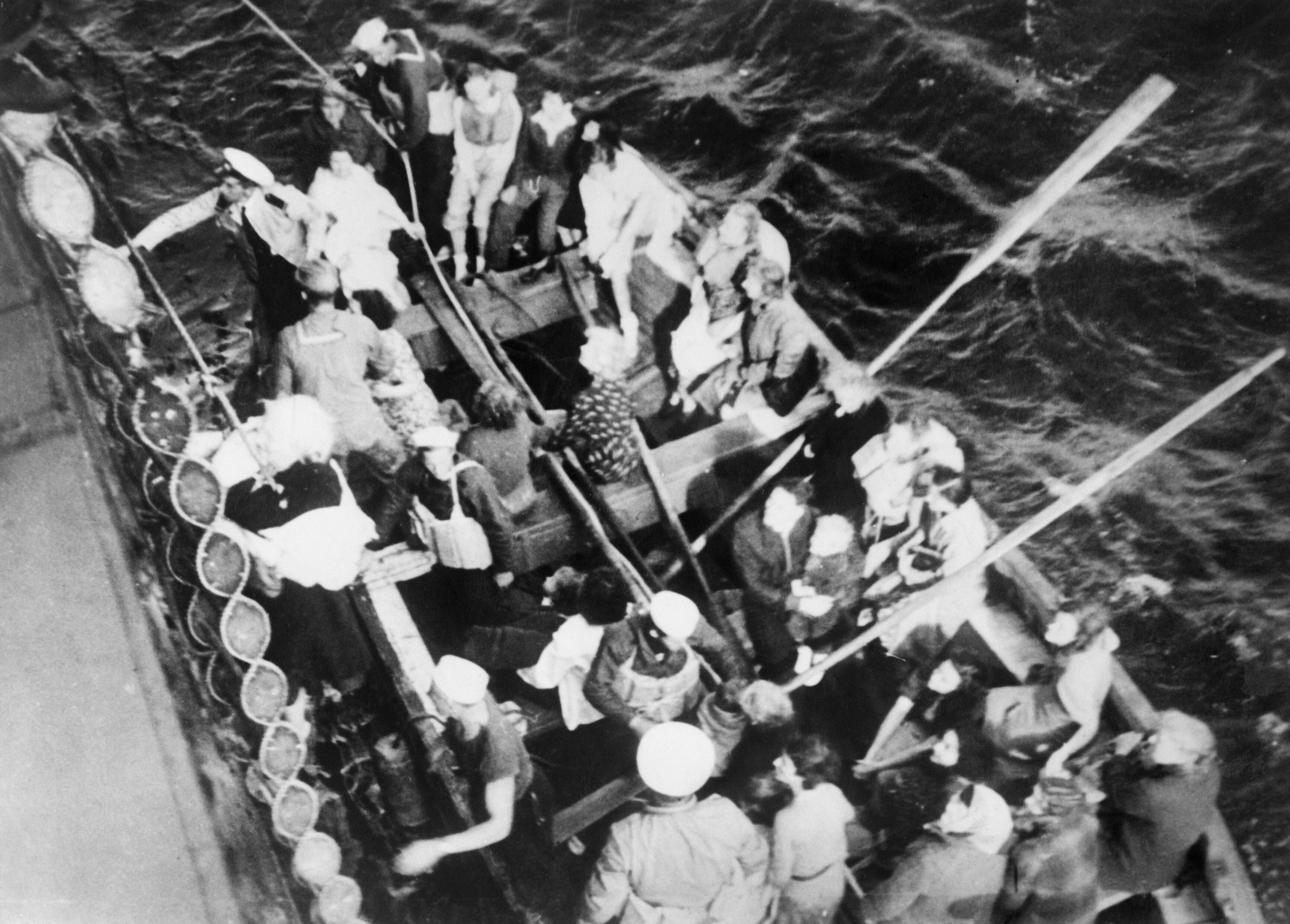
Survivors in one of Athenia's lifeboats alongside City of Flint

Athenia remained afloat for more than 14 hours, until she finally sank stern first at 10:40 the next morning. Of the 1,418 aboard, 98 passengers and 19 crew members were killed. Many died in the engine room and aft stairwell, where the torpedo hit. About 50 people died when one of the lifeboats was crushed in the propeller of Knute Nelson. No. 5A lifeboat came alongside the empty tanker and tied up, against advice, astern of No 12 lifeboat. Only 15 feet (5 m) separated the lifeboat from the tanker's exposed propeller. Once No. 12 lifeboat was emptied, it was cast adrift and began to sink. This fact was reported to the bridge of Knute Nelson. For some reason the ship's engine order telegraph was then set to full ahead. 5A lifeboat's mooring line or "warp" parted under the stress, causing the lifeboat to be pulled back into the revolving propeller.

There was a second accident at about 05:00 hrs when No. 8 lifeboat capsized in a heavy sea below the stern of the yacht Southern Cross, killing ten people. Three passengers were crushed to death while trying to transfer from lifeboats to the Royal Navy destroyers. Other deaths were due to falling overboard from Athenia and her lifeboats, or to injuries and exposure.

54 dead were Canadian and 28 were US citizens, which led to German fears that the incident would bring the US into the war.

=== Aftermath ===
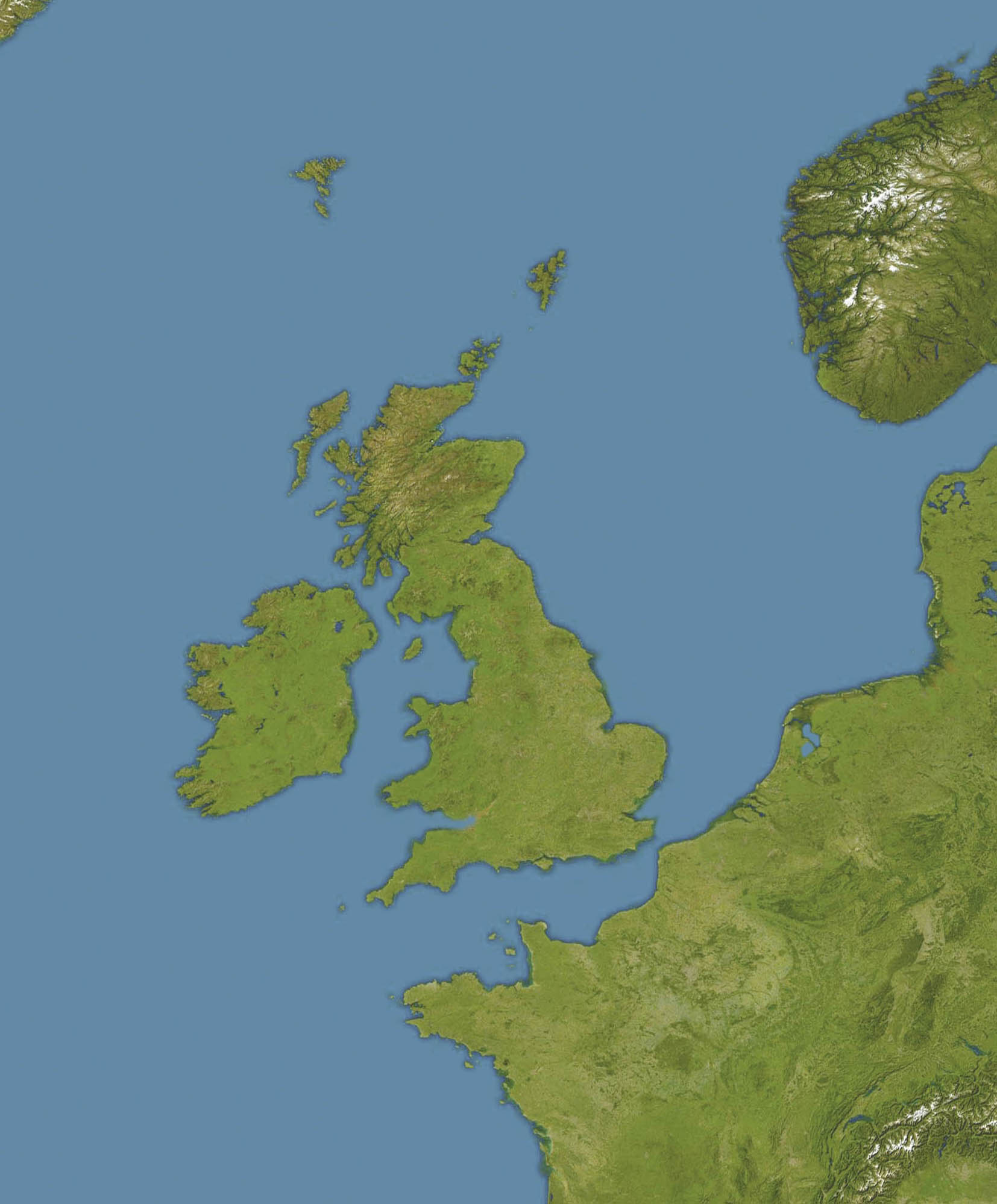
Approximate position of Athenia's wreck

It was not until the Nuremberg Trials after the War that the truth of the U-boat sinking of Athenia finally came out. The sinking was given dramatic publicity throughout the English-speaking world. The front pages of many newspapers ran photographs of the lost ship along with headlines about the British declaration of war. For example, the Halifax Herald of 4 September 1939 had a banner across its front page announcing "LINER ATHENIA IS TORPEDOED AND SUNK" with, in the centre of the page, "EMPIRE AT WAR" in outsized red print.

A Canadian girl, 10-year-old Margaret Hayworth, was among the dead and was one of the first Canadians to be killed by enemy action. Newspapers widely publicised the story, proclaiming "Ten-Year-Old Victim of Torpedo" as "Canadians Rallying Point", and set the tone for their coverage of the rest of the war. One thousand people met the train that brought the child's body back to Hamilton, Ontario, and there was a public funeral attended by the mayor of Hamilton, the city council, the Lieutenant-Governor, Albert Edward Matthews, Premier Mitchell Hepburn, and the entire Ontario cabinet.

The German Navy was blindsided by Lemp's failure to report that he was in the vicinity where the Athenia was struck, had tracked the ship for hours, and sank her. Shy of public criticism, Hitler insisted on silence. Prompted by Lemp's false assertions that the ship had been darkened, located in a war zone, and zigzagging, Raeder decided against court-martialling Lemp for what sounded like an understandable error. However, he ordered the log (KTB) of U-30 to be altered to sustain the falsehood, a decision that helped incriminate him when it was discovered at the end of the war. By then Lemp had been killed in action (1941) and Adolf Schmidt, a surviving witness, came forth to testify that he had been on the bridge after the torpedo hit the Athenia, he had seen the ship foundering, and he had been sworn to secrecy. The prosecutor testified to the falsification of the war diary (KTB).

A month later the Völkischer Beobachter, the Nazi Party's official newspaper, published an article which blamed the loss of Athenia on Britain, accusing Winston Churchill, then First Lord of the Admiralty, of sinking the ship to turn neutral opinion against Germany. Raeder claimed not to have known about this prior to publication and said that if he had known about it, he would have prevented its appearing.

In the US, 60 per cent of respondents to a Gallup poll believed the Germans were responsible, despite their initial claims that Athenia had been sunk by the British for propaganda purposes, with only 9 per cent believing otherwise. Some anti-interventionists called for restraint while at the same time expressing their abhorrence of the sinking. Boake Carter described it as a criminal act.

Some were not completely convinced that Germany was in fact responsible. Herbert Hoover expressed his doubts, saying, "It is such poor tactics that I cannot believe that even the clumsy Germans would do such a thing", while North Carolina senator Robert Rice Reynolds denied that Germany had any motive to sink Athenia. At best, he said, such an action "could only further inflame the world, and particularly America, against Germany, with no appreciable profits from the sinking." He added that Britain could have had a motive – "to infuriate the American people".

It was not until January 1946, during the case against Admiral Raeder at the Nuremberg trials, that a statement by Admiral Dönitz was read in which he finally admitted that Athenia had been torpedoed by U-30 and that every effort had been made to cover it up. Lemp, who had claimed he had mistaken her for an armed merchant cruiser, took the first steps to conceal the facts by omitting to make an entry in the submarine's log, and swearing his crew to secrecy.

After Athenia's sinking, conspiracy theories were circulated by pro-Axis and anti-British circles. For example, one editor in Boston's Italian News suggested the ship had been sunk by British mines and blamed on German U-boats to draw America into the war. The claims were unfounded.

=== Cargo ===
A cargo of 888 tons was taken on in Glasgow, 472 tons of which were building bricks. Other items included granite curling rocks from Scotland, textbooks for the Toronto school system, a number of sealed steel boxes containing new clothes purchased in Europe by tourists, and watercolour paintings by passenger and English illustrator Winifred Walker, intended for her planned book, Shakespeare's Flowers.

Excavations of Urartu antiquities by the American scholars Kirsopp and Silva Lake during 1938–1939 and most of their finds and field records were lost in the sinking of the ship.

On 4 September 1939, curling stone manufacturer Andrew Kay & Co. sent a cablegram to its sales representative in Toronto stating, "We now learn that the Athenia was this morning sunk off the coast of Scotland, and we regret that the finest consignment of curling stones that have ever yet left our factory has gone with it." According to James Wyllie, secretary and director of Kays of Scotland (as the company is now known) in 2018, three bills of lading for this shipment included 48 pairs of Blue Hone Ailsa curling stones for the London, Ontario Curling Club, 41 pairs of Blue Hone Ailsa curling stones for the Toronto High Park Curling Club, and 50 pairs of Red Hone Ailsa curling stones for the Lindsay Curling Club. This is a total of 278 Andrew Kay & Co. Excelsior Ailsa curling stones with handles and cases weighing nearly six tons with a 1939 value of £585.12 (equivalent to £33,067 in 2025).

=== Wreck discovery ===
In 2017, the oceanographer and marine archaeologist David Mearns found a wreck he believes to be Athenia. Mearns located the wreck on Rockall Bank using sonar imagery that was scanned by the Geological Survey of Ireland to map the sea floor. He stated "Can I go into a court of law and say, '100%, that's Athenia?' No. But barring a photograph I can say in my expert opinion there's a very, very high probability that that's Athenia. Everything fits."

=== Legality of sinking ===
As Athenia was an unarmed passenger ship, the attack violated the Hague conventions and the London Naval Treaty of 1930 that allowed all warships, including submarines, to stop and search merchant vessels, but forbade capture as prize or sinking unless the ship was carrying contraband or engaged in military activity. Even if this was the case, and if it was decided to sink their ship, it was required that passengers and crew must be transferred to a "place of safety" as a priority. Although Germany had not signed the 1930 treaty, the German 1936 Prize Rules (Prisenordnung) binding their naval commanders copied most of its restrictions. Rather than warning the Athenia, Lemp of U-30 chose instead to fire without warning.

== Memorials ==
The lost British members of Athenia's crew are commemorated at the Tower Hill Memorial in London. Canadian crew who died are listed at the Halifax Memorial (Sailor's Memorial) at Point Pleasant Park in Halifax, Nova Scotia as well as by a special plaque for Hannah Russell Crawford Baird, 66, a civilian stewardess from Montreal. She was the first Canadian killed in the war and is commemorated in a memorial to female merchant mariners in Langford, British Columbia.

== Popular culture ==
No movie has been made of the full story of the sinking, but the film Arise, My Love (1940), directed by Mitchell Leisen and starring Claudette Colbert and Ray Milland, had a sequence involving the torpedoing of the liner.

The song Rollerskate Skinny, written by Rhett Miller and performed by his band The Old 97's, mentions Athenia's sinking.

In John Dickson Carr's novel The Man Who Could Not Shudder, Dr Fell announces the end of story by showing his audience a newspaper bearing headline "LINER ATHENIA: FULL LIST OF VICTIMS". He means to say that the Second World War has begun and the truth of the mystery is now unlikely to surface.

The sinking of Athenia is also mentioned in Alyson Richman's novel The Lost Wife about pre-war Prague and how the dreams of two young lovers are shattered when they are separated by the Nazi invasion, their endurance and experiences during World War II and the Holocaust only to find one another again decades later in the United States.

Recent extensive research concerning the incident appears in Cay Rademacher's 2009 book Drei Tage im September – die letzte Fahrt der Athenia, 1939 ("Three Days in September - the Last Voyage of the Athenia, 1939") published by MareVerlag of Hamburg.

In the novel by Norman Collins, London Belongs to Me, he describes the sinking of Athenia as war breaks out across Europe. As a result of the sinking, Londoners are in no doubt war has started, and start bracing themselves for what's to come. Similarly, at the close of Patrick Hamilton's Hangover Square (1941) the protagonist, George Bone, finds that the newspapers were "all about the sinking of the Athenia".

The sinking of Athenia also forms part of the beginning in the movie U 47 – Kapitänleutnant Prien (1958).

A graphic firsthand account of the sinking and rescue appears as the first chapter of James A. Goodson's autobiographical account of his wartime experiences as a fighter ace.

The sinking of Athenia plays an integral part of the plot of the novel Nemesis by Rory Clements.

== Notable individuals aboard ==
- Andrew Allan, head of CBC Radio Drama, fiancé of Judith Evelyn (his father was lost)
- Barbara Cass-Beggs, British-Canadian teacher, writer and musicologist (her husband and young daughter also survived)
- Judith Evelyn, American stage and film actress (Craig's Wife) (she survived, as did her fiancé, Andrew Allan)
- Thomas Eldreth Finley, Jr., head of Loomis Chaffee in Windsor, Connecticut, and his wife, Mildred Shacklett Finley
- James A. Goodson, future fighter pilot of the RCAF and later USAAF fighter ace
- Richard Stuart Lake, former Saskatchewan Lieutenant-Governor and federal politician, and his wife, Dorothy Schreiber Lake
- Charles Prince, Sr. and Charles Prince, Jr. both from Kittery, Maine, and employees of the Portsmouth Naval Shipyard
- Nicola Lubitsch, ten-month-old daughter of film director Ernst Lubitsch, rescued from the water by her nurse, Carlina Strohmeyer
- Prof. John H. Lawrence, American physicist and MD, later called father of nuclear medicine. He returned to Berkeley, California, and worked with his brother, physicist Ernest O. Lawrence
- Gildas Molgat, future Canadian politician (with his father and two brothers)
- Agnes Sharpe, sitting CCF alderman for Hamilton's Ward Eight, second female elected to Hamilton City Council
- Prof. Charles Wharton Stork, American writer and essayist (Day Dreams of Greece)
- Dr. Edward T. Wilkes, author of books on pediatrics, founder and first president of the Pediatrics Society of New York, and his son (his wife and his other son were lost)
- Margaretta Finch-Hatton, Countess of Winchilsea, widow of Guy Finch-Hatton, 14th Earl of Winchilsea
- Helen Johnson Hannay, daughter of judge Allen Burroughs Hannay
- George Penrose Woollcombe, founder of Ashbury College
- Dr. Lulu Edith Sweigard, colleague of Mabel Elsworth Todd, pioneer of Ideokinesis, author (Human Movement Potential: Its Ideokinetic Facilitation)
- Margaret Doggett, future wife of Trammell Crow and mother of Harlan Crow
- Betty Jane Stewart (1921-2001), Dallas socialite and alumna of the Hockaday School. Future wife of Giles Edwin Miller, co-owner of the 1952 Dallas Texans (NFL), and later, paternal grandmother of singer-songwriter Rhett Miller, frontman for the alternative country band, Old 97's.
- Bill Gadsby, later a Hall of Fame defenceman in the National Hockey League from 1946 to 1966.
- Winifred Walker, award-winning botanical artist and official artist to the English Royal Horticultural Society of Westminster, in England, and later, artist-in-residence at the University of California.

== See also ==
- RMS Lusitania
- SS City of Benares
- RMS Laconia
- MV Wilhelm Gustloff
- SS General von Steuben

== General sources ==
- Lloyd's Register, Steamships and Motor Ships (PDF). London: Lloyd's Register. 1930.
- Blair, Clay (1996). Hitler's U-Boat War. Vol. I: The Hunters, 1939–1942. New York: Random House. ISBN 0-304-35260-8.
- Brennecke, Jochen (2003). The Hunters and the Hunted. Annapolis, MD: Naval Institute Press. p. 310. ISBN 1-59114-091-9.
- Cain, Lt Cdr Timothy J (1959). HMS Electra. London: Frederick Miller. ISBN 0-86007-330-0.
- Caulfield, Max (1958). A Night of Terror. London: Pan Books.
- Crabb, Brian James (2006). The Loss of British Commonwealth Mercantile and Service Women at sea During the Second World War. Donington, Lincolnshire: Shaun Tyas. p. 310. ISBN 1 900289 66-0.
- Davidson, Eugene (1997). The Trial of the Germans: an account of the twenty-two defendants before the International Military Tribunal at Nuremberg. Columbia, MO: University of Missouri Press. p. 381. ISBN 0-8262-1139-9.
- Doenecke, Justus D (2003). Storm on the Horizon: The Challenge to American Intervention, 1939–1941. Lanham, MD: Rowman & Littlefield. p. 68. ISBN 0-7425-0785-8.
- Evans, Alan (1990). Orphans of the Storm. Hodder & Stoughton. ISBN 0-340-54414-7.
- Fairclough, Ellen (1995). Saturday's Child: Memoirs of Canada's First Female Cabinet Minister. Toronto: University of Toronto Press. p. 61. ISBN 0-802-007368.
- Harwood, Jeremy (2015). World War Two at Sea. Hove, England: Quid Publishing. p. 20. ISBN 978-1-921966-76-7.
- Houghton, Margaret (2003). The Hamiltonians: 100 Fascinating Lives. Toronto: James Lorimer & Company. pp. 75–76. ISBN 1-55028-804-0.
- Padfield, Paddy (1996). The War Beneath The Sea: Submarine Conflict During World War II. New York: John Wiley & Sons. ISBN 0-471-146242.
- Paine, Lincoln P. (1997). Ships of the World: An Historical Encyclopedia. Boston: Houghton Mifflin Harcourt. ISBN 0-395-715563.
- Rademacher, Cay (2009). Drei Tage im September. Hamburg: MareVerlag. ISBN 978-3-866-480995.
- Williams, Andrew (2003). The Battle of the Atlantic: Hitler's Gray Wolves of the Sea and the Allies' Desperate Struggle to Defeat Them. New York: Basic Books. p. 17. ISBN 0-465-09153-9.
