= Goshen High School (Ohio) =

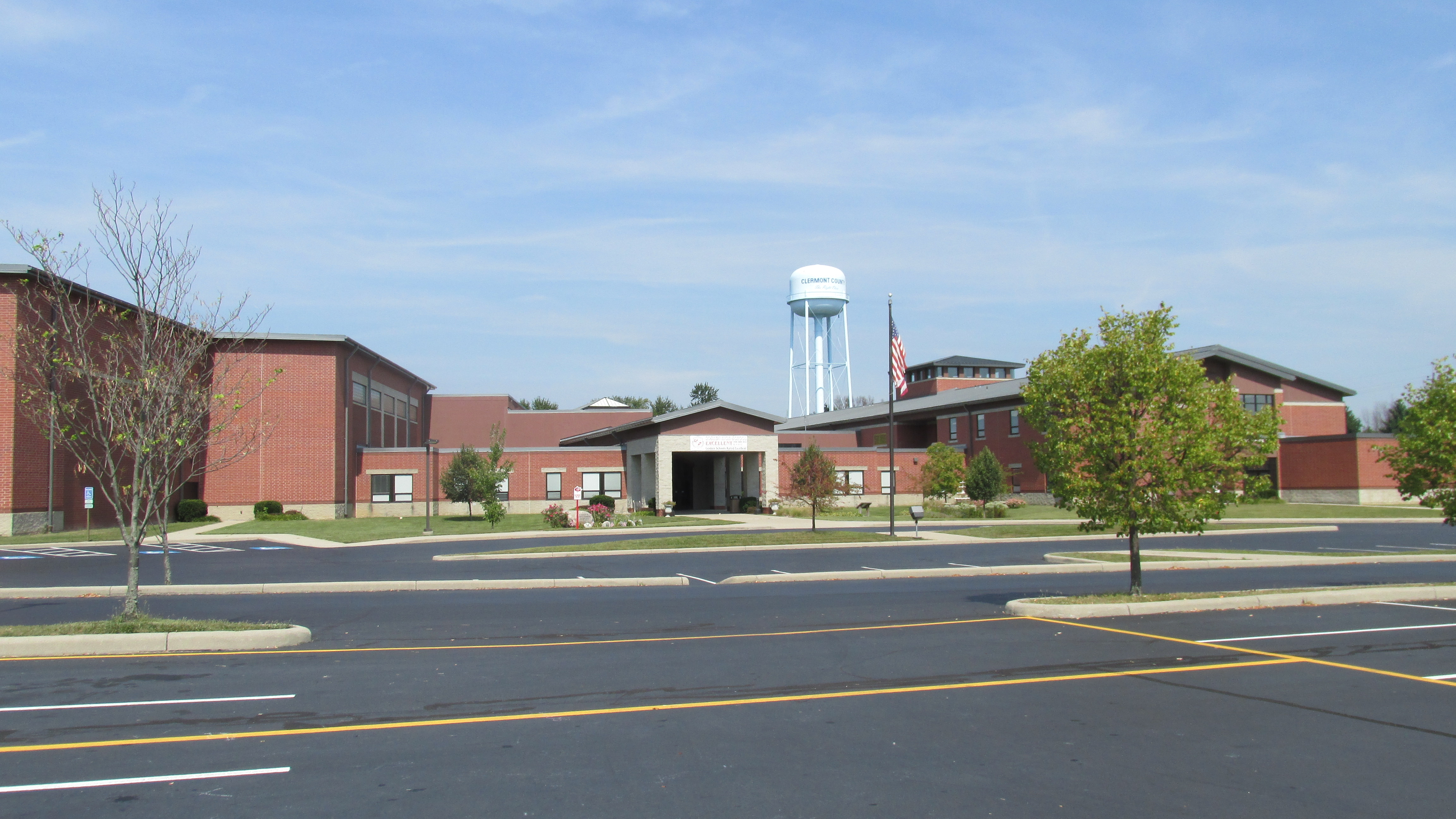

Location
- 6707 Goshen Road; Goshen, (Clermont County), Ohio 45122; United States; 39°13′41″N 84°9′24″W

Information
- Type: Public high school
- School district: Goshen Local School District
- Superintendent: Brian Bailey
- Principal: Caleb Vanden Eynden
- Teaching staff: 37.03 (FTE)
- Grades: 9-12
- Student to teacher ratio: 22.06
- Colors: Scarlet and gray
- Athletics conference: Southern Buckeye Athletic/Academic Conference
- Sports: Men & Women's Cross Country, Men & Women's Soccer, American Football, Men & Women's Basketball, Men & Women's Tennis, Men & Women's Bowling, Men & Women's Track, Baseball, Softball
- Mascot: Warrior
- Team name: Warriors
- Rival: Blanchester High School
- Accreditation: North Central Association of Colleges and Schools
- Website: ghs.goshenlocalschools.org

Goshen High School is a public high school in Goshen, Ohio, United States. It is the only high school in the Goshen Local School District.

== Athletics ==
Goshen's athletic teams, known as the Warriors, participated in the Fort Ancient Valley Conference from 1986 to 2004. The school is now a member of the Southern Buckeye Athletic/Academic Conference's American Division, which they were also a part of from 1928 to 1985.

=== Ohio High School Athletic Association State Championships ===
- Boys' baseball: 1958

== Notable alumni ==
- Sam Leever, former MLB player, Pittsburgh Pirates, 4-time 20-game winner, National League ERA leader, played in first World Series in 1903.
- Bill Faul, former MLB player 6 seasons (Detroit Tigers, Chicago Cubs, San Francisco Giants)
- John J. Voll, World War II flying ace fighter pilot.
