= Bill Faul (baseball) =

American baseball player (1940–2002)

- Pitcher
- Born: April 21, 1940; Cincinnati, Ohio, U.S.
- Died: February 21, 2002 (aged 61); Cincinnati, Ohio, U.S.
- Batted: Right Threw: Right

MLB debut
- September 19, 1962, for the Detroit Tigers

Last MLB appearance
- May 31, 1970, for the San Francisco Giants

MLB statistics
- Win–loss record: 12–16
- Earned run average: 4.72
- Strikeouts: 164
- Stats at Baseball Reference

Teams
- Detroit Tigers (1962–1964); Chicago Cubs (1965–1966); San Francisco Giants (1970)

William Alvan Faul (April 21, 1940 – February 21, 2002) was an American Major League Baseball player, a right-handed pitcher for the Detroit Tigers, Chicago Cubs and San Francisco Giants (1962–66; 1970). He stood 5 feet 10 inches (1.78 m) tall and weighed 184 pounds (83 kg).

Born in Cincinnati, Faul attended Goshen High School. Playing alongside his brother Jerry, Faul helped Goshen win the 1958 Ohio state baseball championship, then he played baseball at the University of Cincinnati, where he set the school's strikeout record and once fanned 24 batters in a game.

== Baseball career ==
Faul signed with the Tigers in 1962. Assigned to the Knoxville Smokies of the Sally League, he won six of eight decisions and posted a 2.10 earned run average. After a one-game major-league trial late in 1962, Faul spent the entire 1963 season with the Tigers. Working as a swing man, he appeared in 28 games pitched, ten as a starter, won five of 11 decisions, had two complete games and one save.

But Faul also gained a reputation as one of his buttoned-up era's more free-spirited players and struggled under old-school manager Chuck Dressen after Dressen took command of the Tigers in mid-season. Faul spent all but one game of the 1964 campaign in Triple-A, where he compiled an outstanding win–loss record (11–1) but a high earned run average (4.05) for the Syracuse Chiefs. The Tigers then sold his contract to Cubs during spring training in 1965.

The deal set up Faul's most successful big-league campaign. It began inauspiciously when he was roughed up during an April relief appearance against his hometown team, the Cincinnati Reds. The outing earned Faul another trip to Triple-A, where he spent two months in the Pacific Coast League. Recalled in July and eventually plugged into the second-division Cubs' starting rotation, Faul worked in 17 games (including 16 starts), threw five complete games and three shutouts, including a two-hitter and a three-hitter. The 1965 Cubs tied a major league record by turning three triple plays, and Faul was the pitcher on each occasion. At one point that season, Faul credited the success he was having to his having the ability to hypnotize himself and batters. For the year, Faul posted a 6–6 record and set a personal best with a 3.54 earned run average.

He began 1966 working out of the bullpen for the Cubs' new manager, Leo Durocher, but got a chance to start on May 1 against the Philadelphia Phillies at Wrigley Field. He defeated the Phils 6–1, registering what would be his final major league victory. He got in five more starts during the seasons first half, but was sent to Triple-A Tacoma in July. After spending 31/2 years in the minors, he surfaced in the majors again as a member of the Giants' 1970 bullpen, appearing in seven May games and registering one save. Then he was sent back to Triple-A, where he toiled through 1971. After sitting out the 1972 campaign, he made a final comeback in the Cubs' organization in 1973 before retiring.

All told, Faul appeared in 71 big-league games, including 33 starting assignments, over all or parts of six seasons. He won 12 games, lost 16, with eight complete games, three shutouts, and two saves. In 2611/3 innings pitched he allowed 247 hits and 97 bases on balls, with 164 strikeouts. His career ERA was 4.72.

== Personal life and death ==
Faul was a resident of Pleasant Plain, Ohio. He died at age 61.
