= James A. Goodson =

United States Army Air Forces flying ace

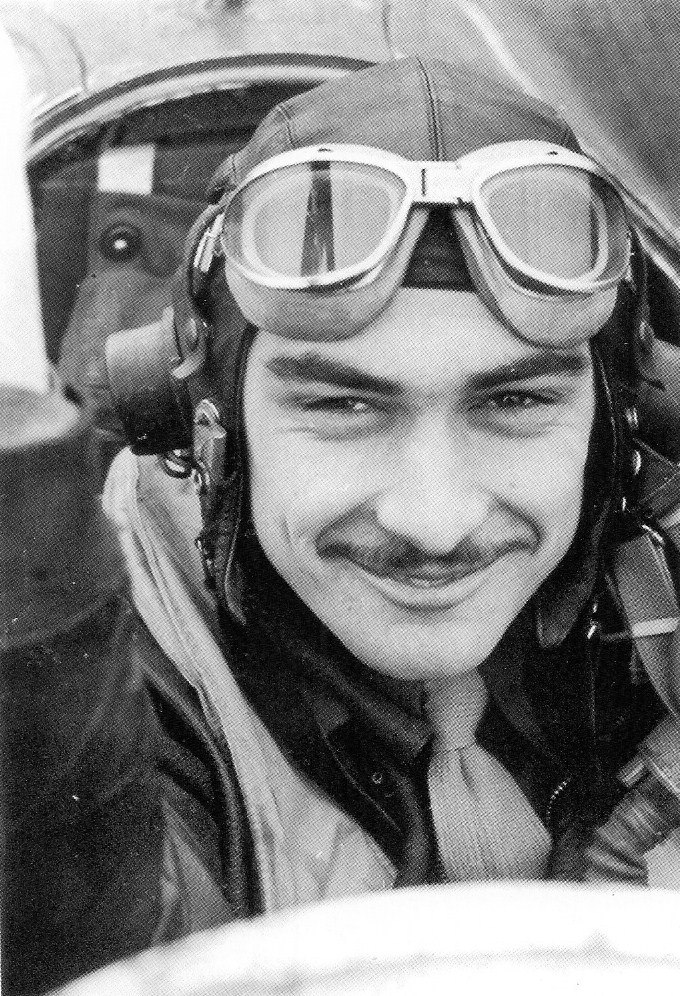
- Born: March 21, 1921; New York, New York
- Died: May 1, 2014 (aged 93); Duxbury, Massachusetts
- Military career
- Allegiance: Canada; United Kingdom; United States
- Branch: Royal Canadian Air Force (1941); Royal Air Force (1941–42); United States Army Air Forces (1942–47); United States Air Force Reserve (1947–59)
- Service years: 1941–1959
- Rank: Lieutenant Colonel
- Nickname: King of the Strafers
- Units: No. 416 Squadron RCAF; No. 43 Squadron RAF
- Commands: 336th Fighter Squadron; No. 133 Squadron RAF
- Conflicts: World War II
- Awards: Distinguished Service Cross; Silver Star; Distinguished Flying Cross (9); Purple Heart; Air Medal (21); Distinguished Flying Cross (United Kingdom); Order of Leopold (Belgium); Croix de guerre (Belgium); Knight of the Legion of Honour (France); Croix de guerre (France)

James Alexander Goodson (March 21, 1921 – May 1, 2014) was a United States Army Air Force fighter ace who was credited with shooting down fifteen aircraft and destroying another fifteen on the ground during World War II. Born in New York City, US, he later moved following the death of his father to Simcoe County, Ontario, Canada, along with his mother who had family in the area. The pair later moved to Toronto, Canada, where his mother operated a rooming house.

Prior to the war, he studied languages at the University of Toronto before hitchhiking and travelling by ship to Europe as a pantry boy so he could see the world. He was in Paris at the time of the German invasion of Poland. Travelling back to England, he booked a ticket on the SS Athenia from Liverpool to Montreal, Canada, which departed on September 2, 1939, and was hit by a torpedo from a German submarine the following evening. After being rescued and reaching the United Kingdom, he attempted to join the Royal Air Force, but was told he would have better luck in Canada.

Later reaching Canada on the SS Dutchess of Athol, he attempted to join the Royal Canadian Air Force (RCAF), but due to the length of the waiting list he went back to the University of Toronto before again joining a ship as a pantry boy, later a steward, travelling to South America and the Mediterranean. He joined the RCAF upon his return to Canada, finishing training on December 5, 1941.

During the course of his military service, he served for three countries under 416 Squadron RCAF, 43 Squadron and 133 Squadron (Eagle) RAF and 336th Fighter Squadron. He was shot down during an attack on a German airbase on June 20, 1944, not long after which he was taken prisoner until the end of the war. He was awarded the Silver Star, nine Distinguished Flying Crosses, the Purple Heart and 21 awards of the Air Medal.

Following the war, he worked for the Goodyear Tire & Rubber Company as an executive and later the president of Compagnie Française Goodyear, Hoover and ITT Inc.

== Early life ==
James Goodson was born in New York City, US, on March 21, 1921. Following the death of his father, he grew up Simcoe County, Ontario, Canada, where his mother, Gertrude Elizabeth Goodson (died January 21, 1948), had family, later moving to Toronto, Canada, where his mother operated a rooming house. Prior to leaving Canada to see the world, he was studying languages in Toronto. He hitchhiked with seven college boys outside Winnipeg, Manitoba, after lying that he could cook and drive, both of which he "learned to perform acceptable" as they travelled to Cornwall, Ontario. There, he again hitchhiked, this time with an automobile dealer that had bought a hearse for its engine. By the summer of 1939, he had found a job as a pantry boy on a Cunard Line cruise ship bound for Liverpool, England.

A few months after he arrived, the US Ambassador to the United Kingdom, Joseph P. Kennedy Sr., advised that all US citizens return due to the threat of war. At some point after his arrival in England, he crossed over to France, and was in Paris when Germany invaded Poland. Speaking of this time in 1944, he said "There was very little excitement over the war and at first they didn't black-out the lights about the Arc de Triomphe. I returned to England and found every one looking for gas masks and preparing for the blackout. I decided that if the English were excited I'd better get the same way."

=== SS Athenia ===
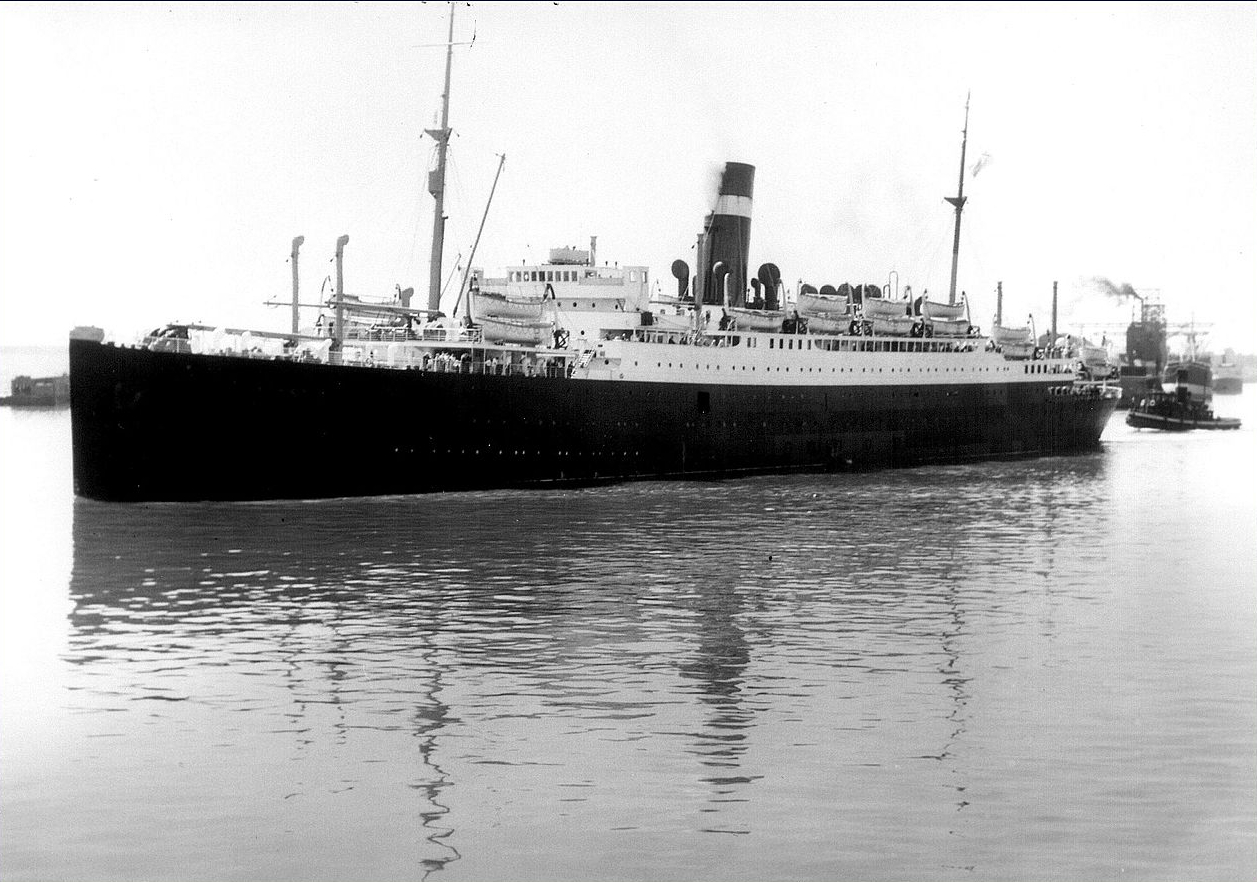
SS Athenia in Montreal Harbor, c. 1933

He booked a ticket to travel to Canada on the SS Athenia, one of the last ships to leave the United Kingdom before the beginning of World War II, bound from Liverpool, United Kingdom, to Montreal, Canada. The Athenia left port on September 2, reaching 60 nautical miles (110 km) south of Rockall and 200 nautical miles (370 km) northwest of Inishtrahull, Ireland on the evening of September 3, the day of the British declaration of war on Germany. She was spotted by the German submarine U-30 commanded by Oberleutnant Fritz-Julius Lemp at around 16:30 and mistaken for either a troopship, a Q-ship, or an armed merchant cruiser. The submarine tracked her until 19:38, when both vessels were between Rockall and Tory Island, when Lemp ordered for torpedoes to be fired. One exploded on Athenia's port side in her engine room, and she began to settle by the stern.

Goodson later told reporters that "The lights went out and there was an explosion which killed many people. The place was very badly crowded. [...] It was a real rat race there". He was variously described as having been on deck during interviews after the occupants of the ship were rescued and below deck when the torpedo struck, with the latter interview in 1944 reading that a Scotsman had said to him "All my life I have been trying to get to America, but even now, sailing there, I somehow feel I won't make it." Goodson stated that he comforted the man, and was near the third-class dining room when the torpedo struck, noting that the sauce cook had been "scalded with his hot sauce", that the grill cook had been thrown against the hot grill, burning his back, and that the fish cook had been "blown to the top deck". When passing the area where he and the Scotsman had spoken, he found him dead.

In the interview following the rescue, he stated "I went to see if there were people trapped in the main section, and I saw dead bodies swooshing around in the water". He reportedly swam through a flooded section of the ship to rescue struggling passengers, guiding them to what remained of the stairs and assisted the ship's medical party before heading for a lifeboat.

Several ships responded to the Athenia's distress signal, including the E-class destroyers HMS Electra and HMS Escort, F-class destroyer HMS Fame, the Swedish yacht Southern Cross, the 5,749 GRT Norwegian dry cargo ship MS Knute Nelson, and the US cargo ship City of Flint. Athenia sank stern-first at approximately 11:00 the following morning, becoming the first British ship sunk during the war and what is believed to be the first ship sunk in the war.

Of the 1,418 aboard, consisting of 1,102 passengers and 316 crew, 117 were killed in either the initial explosion or on two of the 26 lifeboats launched, its full complement, that were destroyed; one lifeboat was destroyed when it was struck by the propeller of the Knute Nelson, killing 50, while the other capsized. Of the dead, 16 were Canadian and 28 were US citizens, which led to German fears that the incident would cause the US to declare war on them.

Goodson was rescued by the Knute Nelson and transported to Galway, Ireland. Goodson was told by the recruiter at a Royal Air Force (RAF) recruitment station that he would have better luck trying to join the Royal Canadian Air Force (RCAF). Some time afterwards, he went to Canada on the SS Dutchess of Athol. He attempted to join the RCAF, but the waiting list was so long at the time that he decided to go to the University of Toronto instead. Before the end of the year, he decided again to join a ship, joining the MV Montrolite, going from pantry boy to steward on its journey to South America and the Mediterranean. Upon his return to Canada, he was accepted to the RCAF.

== Military career ==
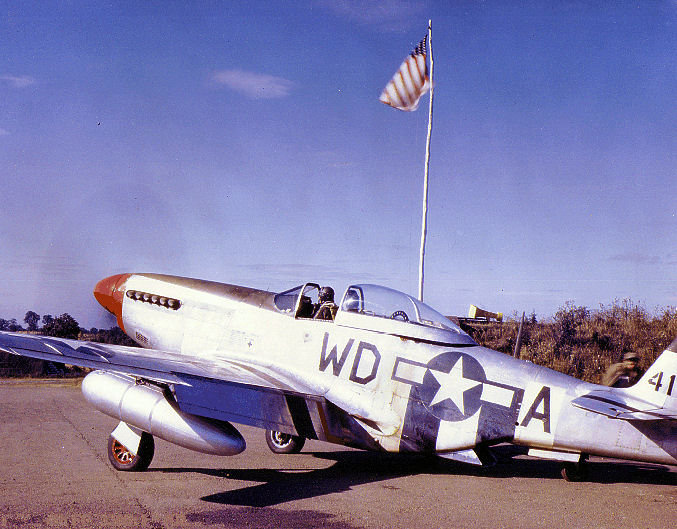
P-51 Mustang of the 4th Fighter Group, 336th Fighter Squadron

Goodson completed his flight training at RCAF Station Dunnville, Ontario, on December 5, 1941. Speaking to reporters, he said "Some fellows could best serve their country by completing their university course, but not me. My place is in the war". Two days later, Japan attacked Pearl Harbor.

Initially being assigned to 416 Squadron RCAF in the United Kingdom as a Flight Sergeant, he performed 100 operational flight hours during which reportedly not much happened. He stated that he missed the Dieppe Raid because he was on leave at the time. At one point he served under Douglas Bader, and served with 43 Squadron RAF. Goodson was later transferred to 133 (Eagle) Squadron RAF, one of three Eagle squadrons made up of American volunteers. He arrived following the loss of 11 of the squadron's 12 new Spitfire Mk IX's during a September 26, 1942 daylight bomber escort mission over the city of Morlaix, France. Three days later, all Eagle squadrons were absorbed into the 4th Fighter Group US Army Air Forces (USAAF), as the 334th, 335th and 336th Fighter Squadrons. By the fall of 1942, the 4th Fighter Group was the only operational American fighter group in Europe.

He was reportedly one of the first pilots to fly the P-47 Thunderbolt and, in October 1942, flew alongside First Lieutenant R. L. Alexander on the first American-led, low-level strafing missions over Belgium as part of a two-plane sortie, reaching the coast south of Blankenberge before heading east over the Selzette canal. (Note: Presumably the canal running roughly eastwards from the city of Oostende to Bruges before turning south.) In the canal, they "spotted five sets of six or eight barges", which they attacked at low-level for a short time before returning home. He was also reportedly involved in the first American flight over Germany.

By June 23, 1943, Goodson was a First Lieutenant; his award of an oak leaf cluster for the Air Medal was printed in Stars and Stripes a month later on July 21. His award of the Distinguished Flying Cross was printed in Stars and Stripes on 27 September that year. By the following January 8, when Stars and Stripes printed he had become an ace after destroying two Fw 190's in a single sortie, Goodson was a Captain.

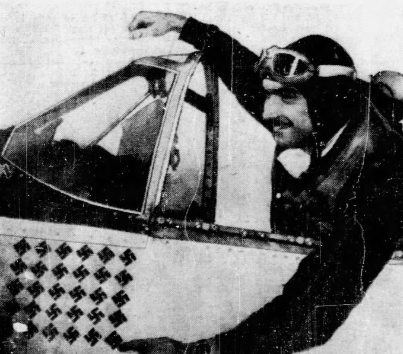
James Goodson pointing to 30 victory marks, c. 1944

On May 29, his award of the Distinguished Service Cross, the US military’s second-highest medal, was printed in Stars and Stripes, for actions that took place March 16 and March 23, 1944 in "destroying superior forces", the prior of which was, while escorting a bomber force over Berlin, Germany, he shot down two Bf 109's. Sources differ as to what he was flying at the time; The Globe and Mail and The Washington Post's obituaries published in May 2014 claim he was flying a P-47 Thunderbolt at the time, while the Stars and Stripes claimed on May 29, 1944 that he was a Major in command of a P-51 Mustang squadron at the time; The Globe and Mail's obituary also claimed that, that spring, the 336th was refitted with P-51 Mustangs, with the aim to both escort bombers and perform free-hunts for German aircraft.

By the publishing of May 9, 1944's issue of Stars and Stripes in Tunis, Goodson had flown over 200 combat sorties, shot down 13 enemy aircraft, earned the Silver Star after "he fought off ten enemy planes which were attacking the crippled plane of his group commander [...] and shot down two of them" and earned the Distinguished Flying Cross with three oak clusters. During his vacation to the Mediterranean Theatre, which was published in that issue, he visited Allied fighter bases to speak with pilots about the difficulties of fighting in the theatre. Reportedly believing he could learn more from flying in the theatre, he requested to fly a mission with the 15th Army Air Force; the mission he flew took place on April 23, where they were tasked with attacking a target in Wiener Neustadt, Austria. During this mission, he was credited with destroying two Bf 109's, bringing his total aerial victories to 15.

=== Capture ===
Goodson was shot down by anti-air fire while strafing an airfield in a P-51 Mustang on June 20, 1944, where, despite suffering a wound to his leg, he performed a belly landing and survived. He fled to a birch wood and collapsed from his injuries. His loss was not reported until July 12 that year. For several days, he survived by eating mice, snails and "just about anything that crawled." He was later captured and taken to by interrogated by the Gestapo. Despite protesting that he was an American officer, he was told they intended to execute him. Offered a final wish, he noticed a nearby box of Havana cigars. He requested a final smoke, which was granted to him, during which he blew smoke rings. His interrogator became curious, after which Goodson taught him how to do it. The interrogator later agreed to take Goodson to Stalag Luft III, a prisoner of war (POW) camp, with him being reported as a POW by the International Red Cross by July 22, 1944. Three months prior to his arrival, 76 Allied aviators had tunnelled out of the RAF section of the camp.

With the Soviets approaching by early 1945, German forces began performing mass executions at POW and concentration camps in eastern Europe. During a blizzard, a 90 km (56 mi) death march began, with Goodson later recalling in an interview with the Toronto Daily Star "I saw some chaps fall down in sheer weakness". Eventually, they were forced into cattle cars and transported to Stalag VII-A. The camp was liberated by Combat Command A of the 14th Armored Division, US Army, on 29 April 1945. According to official German sources, there had been 76,248 prisoners at the camp in January 1945. By May 14 that year, he was in England.

== Post-war and personal life ==
Goodson returned to Toronto in the summer of 1945, ending the war as a Major, and was some time prior to May 19, 1949 promoted to Lieutenant Colonel in the US Air Force. His honors included the Silver Star, nine Distinguished Flying Crosses, the Purple Heart and 21 awards of the Air Medal.

After his return to the US, he was sent on a tour to advertise war bonds. He was at a rally during the tour in Akron, Ohio when news arrived that Japan had surrendered. At that rally, he was sat next to Edwin J. Thomas, then president of the Goodyear Tire & Rubber Company, who offered Goodson a job. Goodson then became a Goodyear executive in Europe, reconnecting with Gwendoline Rice, an English woman he met during the war. They later married in 1951, living in different countries in Europe. By 1961, he was the president of Compagnie Française Goodyear. He later worked with Hoover and ITT Inc. He wrote a memoir which was published in 1983 titled Tumult in the Clouds.

They went to the United Kingdom in 1992 for the 50th anniversary of the arrival of American pilots. He died in hospital of pneumonia on May 1, 2014, 11 days after the death of his wife. The pair had a son, James Goodson Jr., and three grandchildren. He was buried with military honors at the Massachusetts National Cemetery in Bourne, including a flypast by the 104th Fighter Wing.
