= Jared C. Monti =

United States Army Medal of Honor recipient (1975–2006)

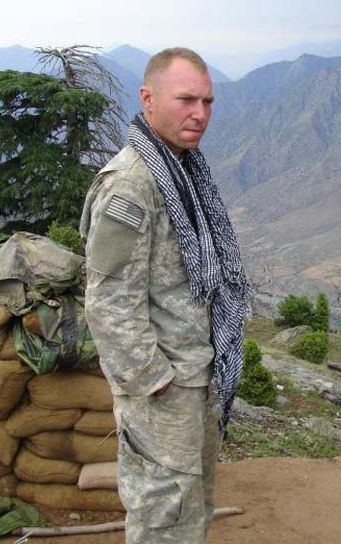
- Monti in Afghanistan, in May 2006.
- Born: September 20, 1975; Abington, Massachusetts, United States
- Died: June 21, 2006 (aged 30); Gowardesh, Nuristan Province, Afghanistan
- Burial place: Massachusetts National Cemetery, Bourne, Massachusetts
- Military career
- Allegiance: United States
- Branch: United States Army
- Service years: 1993–2006
- Rank: Sergeant first class
- Units: 3rd Squadron, 71st Cavalry Regiment; 3rd Brigade Combat Team, 10th Mountain Division
- Conflicts: War in Afghanistan †
- Awards: Medal of Honor; Bronze Star Medal; Purple Heart; Army Commendation Medal (x5)

Jared Christopher Monti (September 20, 1975 – June 21, 2006) was a soldier in the United States Army who received the United States military's highest decoration for valor, the Medal of Honor, for his actions in the War in Afghanistan.

Monti was deployed with his unit when they were attacked by a group of enemy insurgents. When another soldier was wounded, Monti attempted to rescue him three times and was killed in action. President Barack Obama signed the authorization for Monti to receive the Medal of Honor and the medal was presented to his family in a ceremony, the President's first, at the White House in 2009. Monti was the sixth person from the wars in Iraq and Afghanistan to be awarded the Medal of Honor.

== Early life ==
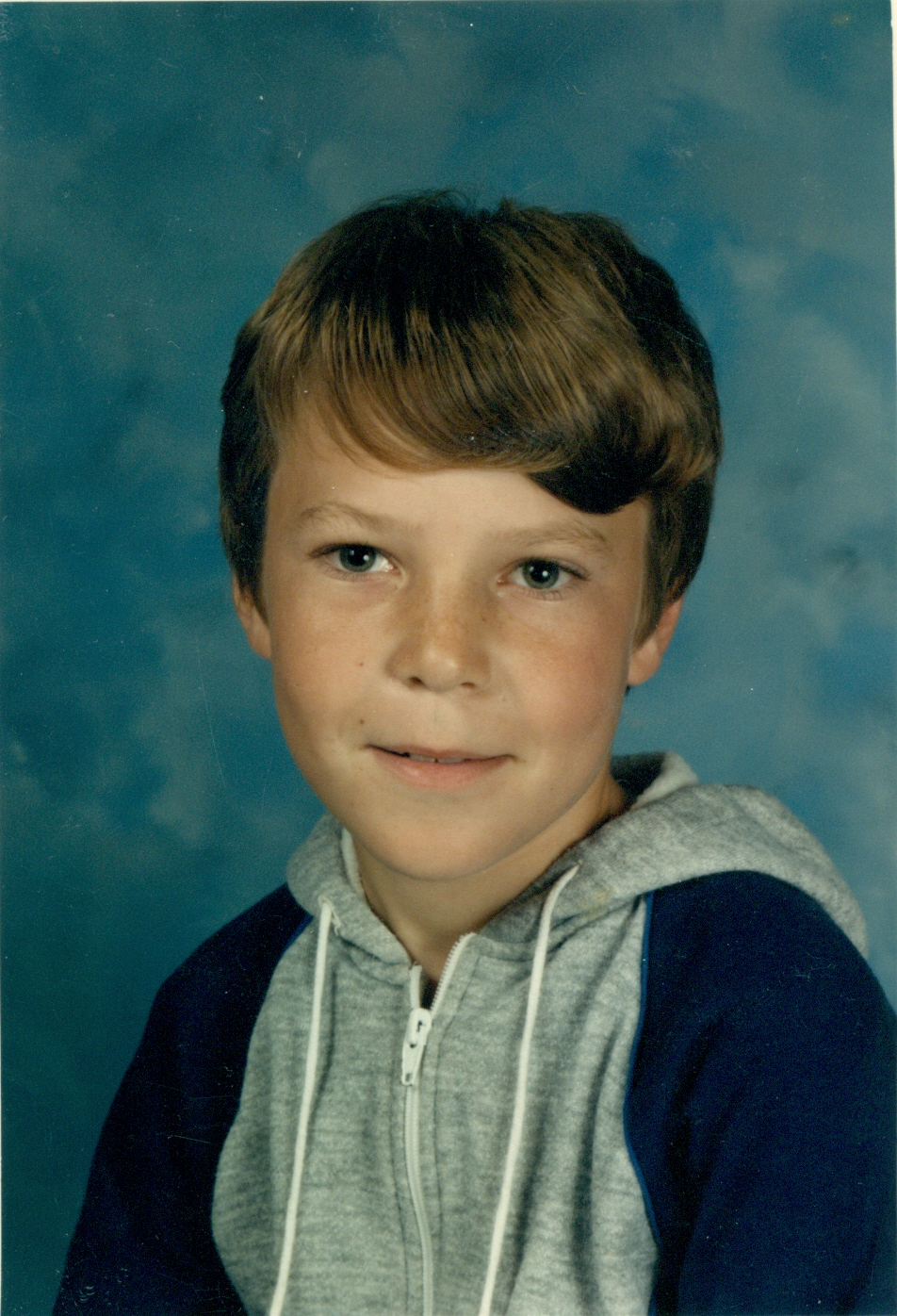
Monti as a young boy

Monti was born in Abington, Massachusetts, on September 20, 1975, to Paul, a high school Science teacher, and Janet Monti. He grew up in Raynham, Massachusetts and, even as a child, he demonstrated the adventurous character that would later earn him the Medal of Honor. As a four-year-old, he disappeared from the backyard one day, and his mother found him later on hanging by the hood of his sweatshirt on the other side of the fence. On another occasion, a migraine headache kept him home from school, but he left the house and was later found climbing a tree. In 1994 he graduated from Bridgewater-Raynham Regional High School at the age of 18. Monti had two siblings, a sister, Nicole and a brother, Timothy.

== Military service ==
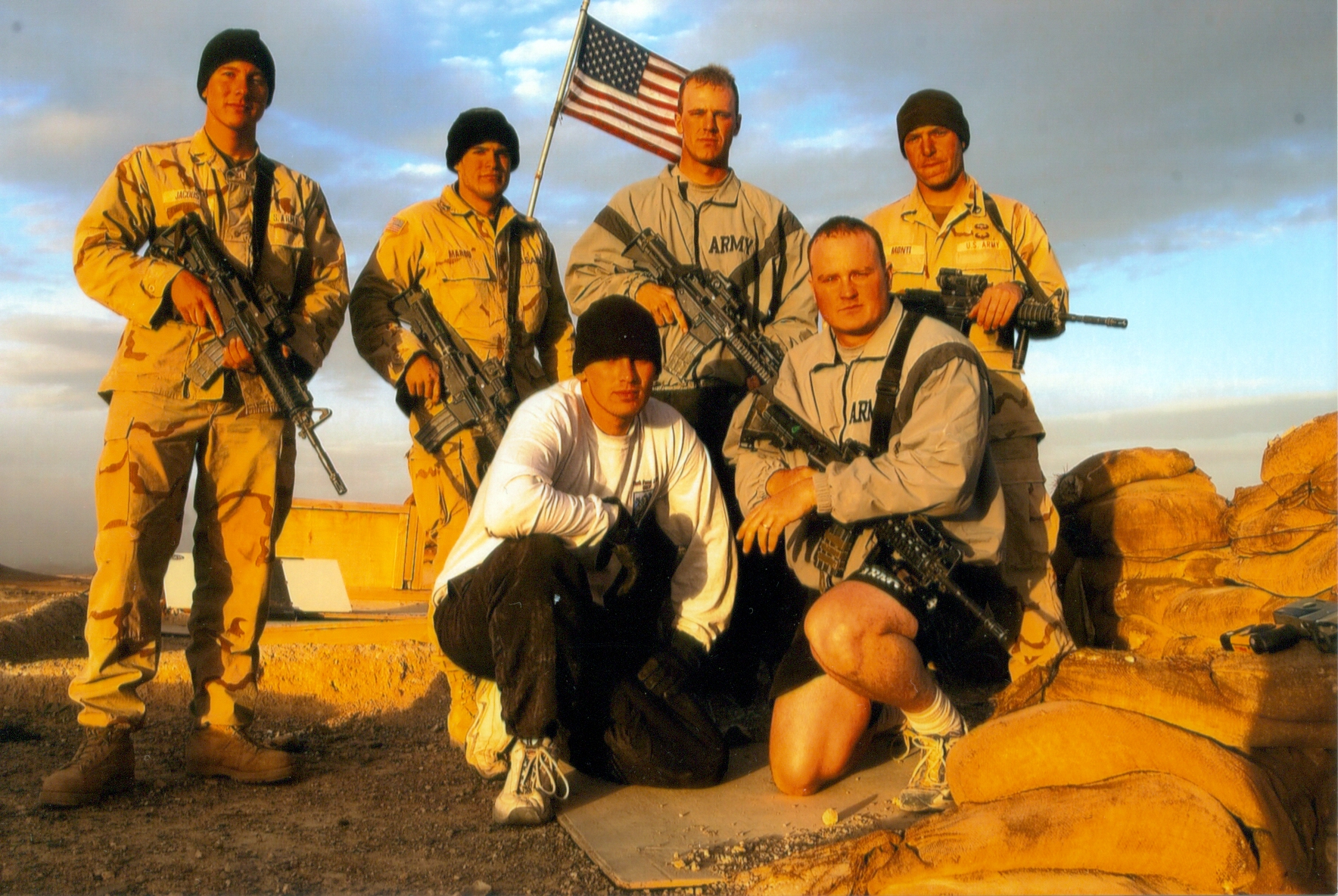
Monti with his team members

After enlisting in the Army in March 1993, he completed basic training and forward observer training at Fort Sill, Oklahoma and continued his training as a paratrooper with the 82nd Airborne Division. Monti, a fire support specialist, served as a staff sergeant and Fire Support Team sergeant with the 3rd Squadron, 71st Cavalry Regiment, 3rd Brigade Combat Team, 10th Mountain Division. Previous to his service in Afghanistan he earned his British Parachutist Badge with Wings while training in England in 1998 and was deployed to Kosovo in 1999 with Operation Joint Guardian. Despite sustaining injuries as a paratrooper in the 82nd Airborne Division, he rejected a medical discharge and reenlisted to deploy with his unit to Afghanistan in February 2006, as part of Task Force Spartan.

=== Medal of Honor action ===
On June 21, 2006, Monti served as the assistant leader of a 16-man patrol and leader of a weapons forward observer team tasked with gathering intelligence in Gowardesh, Nuristan Province, in northeastern Afghanistan. The team established a small base on a ridge to support a larger Army operation in the valley below. When the larger operation was delayed, Monti's team ran low on provisions. The helicopter that brought supplies revealed the team's position.

That evening, the patrol was attacked by a group of at least 50 insurgents, who had established two positions on a wooded ridge about 50 yards above the patrol and attempted to outflank Monti and his team. The Americans took cover and returned fire, and Monti radioed for artillery and close air support. Enemy fire killed Staff Sergeant Patrick Lybert. Another Soldier, Private First Class Brian J. Bradbury, was severely wounded and left lying in the open between the enemy and the team's position. Staff Sergeant Chris Cunningham, leader of the patrol's sniper team, called out that he was going to try to rescue Bradbury. Monti replied, "That’s my guy. I am going to get him."

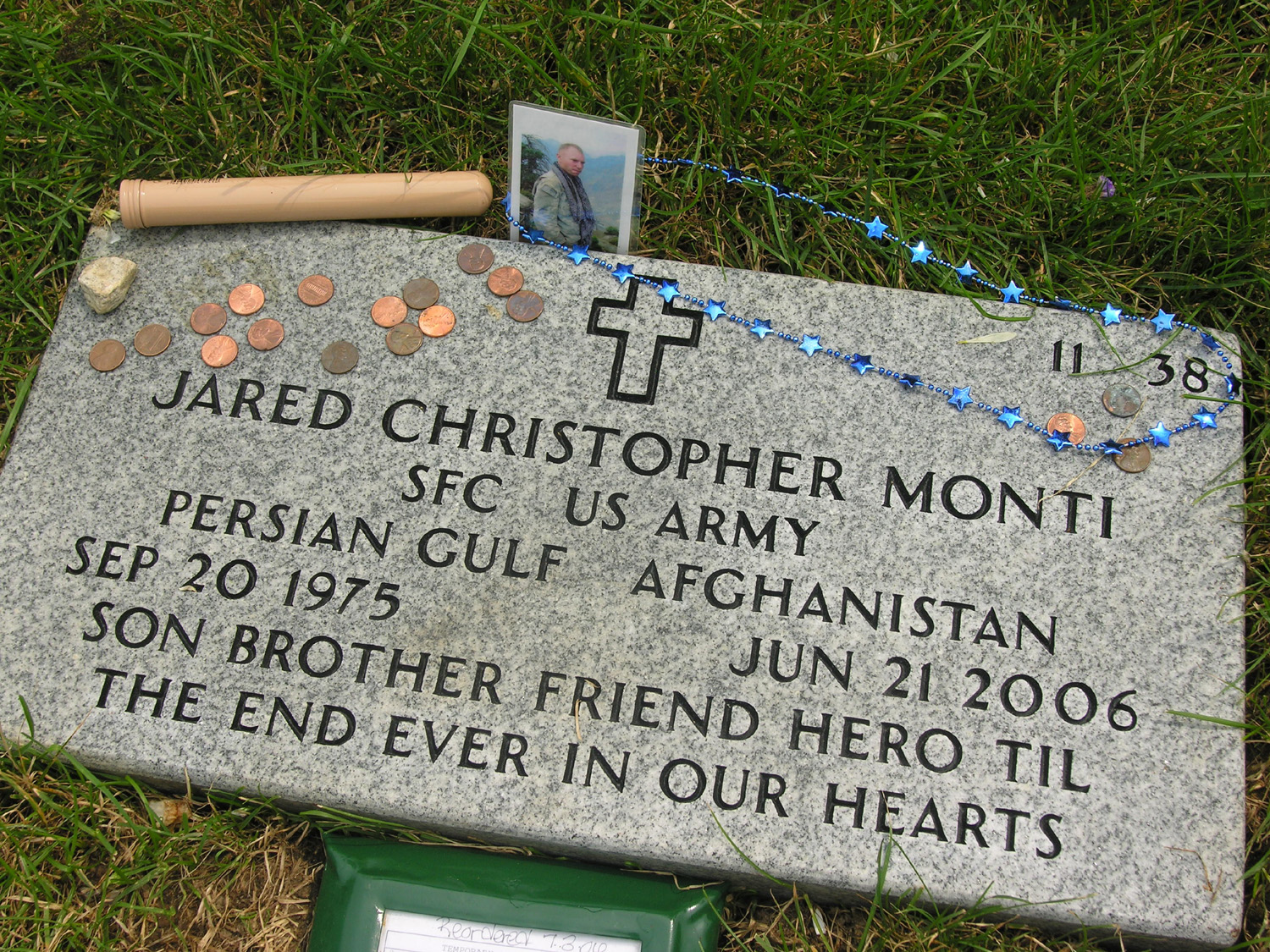
Jared C. Monti at Massachusetts National Cemetery

Monti made three attempts to reach Bradbury. On his first, he advanced to within three feet of Bradbury before being forced back by intense machine-gun and rocket-propelled grenade (RPG) fire. His second try was similarly turned back and as the rest of his patrol provided covering fire, Monti advanced a third time but was struck by an RPG. Some news reports indicated that the explosion blew off both of his legs, but this is not supported by family accounts or military records. Monti attempted to crawl back towards cover. He is reported by comrades to have made his peace with God and asked Sgt. Cunningham to tell his parents he loved them. Monti died moments later. At about the same time, the artillery and air support for which he had called began hitting the enemy position, killing 22 of the attackers and dispersing the rest.

PFC Bradbury subsequently died during his evacuation when the cable broke on the rescue hoist lifting him to a 159th Medical Company (Air Ambulance) helicopter. The fall also killed Staff Sergeant Heathe Craig, 28, a medic from Severn, Maryland.

== Burial and Medal of Honor ceremony ==
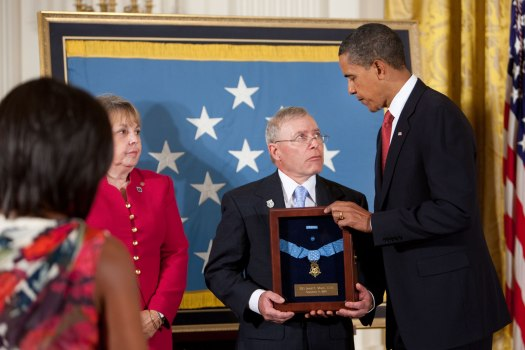
Monti's parents receive his Medal of Honor from President Barack Obama during a ceremony in the White House, September 17, 2009.

Monti is buried in section 11, site 38 of the Massachusetts National Cemetery in Bourne, Massachusetts. The Army posthumously promoted him to sergeant first class.

On July 24, 2009, President Barack Obama signed the authorization for Monti to receive the Medal of Honor for this action. The medal was presented to the family by the President in a formal ceremony at the White House on September 17, 2009. Monti is the 3,448th recipient of the honor since the medal was established by the U.S. Congress during the American Civil War. Additionally, he is the second Medal of Honor recipient from the conflict in Afghanistan, after Navy SEAL Michael P. Murphy, who received the medal in 2007.

Jared's father, Paul Monti, dedicated his life to sharing Jared's story and to promoting awareness of the challenges faced by Gold Star Families. After Paul noticed there were no flags on the gravesites at Bourne National Cemetery, Paul fought to change the legislation and started Operation Flags for Vets. Now, hundreds of volunteers place thousands of flags on veterans' graves every Memorial Day and Veterans Day. Paul Monti died on August 26, 2022. He was laid to rest on September 1, 2022, alongside Jared, thanks to the efforts of another Gold Star parent who changed the law, allowing parents to be buried with their adult children in military cemeteries.

== Military awards ==
SFC Monti's personal decorations include:

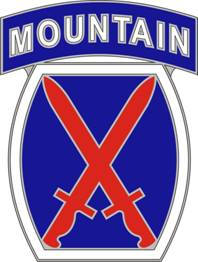

Right breast	Left breast		
10th Mountain Division; CSIB
10th Mountain Division; CSIB	Combat Action Badge		
10th Mountain Division; CSIB	Medal of Honor		Bronze Star Medal
10th Mountain Division; CSIB	Purple Heart Medal	Army Commendation Medal w/ four bronze oak leaf clusters	Army Achievement Medal w/ three oak leaf clusters
10th Mountain Division; CSIB	Army Good Conduct Medal w/ four bronze loops	National Defense Service Medal	Armed Forces Expeditionary Medal
10th Mountain Division; CSIB	Kosovo Campaign Medal w/ services star	Afghanistan Campaign Medal w/ service star	Global War on Terrorism Expeditionary Medal
10th Mountain Division; CSIB	Global War on Terrorism Service Medal	Korea Defense Service Medal	NCO Professional Development Ribbon w/ award numeral 2
10th Mountain Division; CSIB	Army Service Ribbon	Army Overseas Service Ribbon w/ award numeral 3	NATO Medal for Kosovo with 1 Service star
10th Mountain Division; CSIB	Parachutist Badge		Air Assault Badge

=== Medal of Honor citation ===

For conspicuous gallantry and intrepidity in action at the risk of his life above and beyond the call of duty.
Sergeant First Class Monti distinguished himself at the cost of his life while serving as a team leader with the Headquarters and Headquarters Troop, 3d Squadron, 71st Cavalry Regiment in Nuristan Province, Afghanistan on 21 June 2006. On that day, Sergeant First Class Monti was leading a mission to gather intelligence and to direct fires against the enemy in support of a squadron-size interdiction mission. While at an observation position on top of a mountain ridge, Sergeant First Class Monti’s sixteen-man patrol came under attack by a superior force consisting of as many as 50 enemy fighters. On the verge of being overrun, Sergeant First Class Monti directed his patrol to set up a hasty defensive position behind a collection of rocks. He then began to call for indirect fire from a nearby support base; accurately bringing the rounds upon the enemy who had closed to within 50 meters of his position. While still calling for fire, Sergeant First Class Monti personally engaged the enemy with his rifle and a grenade, successfully disrupting an attempt to flank the patrol. Sergeant First Class Monti then realized that one of his Soldiers was lying wounded and exposed in the open ground between the advancing enemy and the patrol’s position. With complete disregard for his own safety, Sergeant First Class Monti moved from behind the cover of the rocks into the face of withering enemy fire. After closing within meters of his wounded Soldier, the heavy volume of fire forced Sergeant First Class Monti to seek cover. Sergeant First Class Monti then gathered himself and rose again to maneuver through a barrage of enemy fire to save his wounded Soldier. Again, Sergeant First Class Monti was driven back by relentless enemy fire. Unwilling to leave his Soldier wounded and exposed, Sergeant First Class Monti made another attempt to move across open terrain and through the enemy fire to the aid of his wounded Soldier. On his third attempt, Sergeant First Class Monti was mortally wounded, sacrificing his own life in an effort to save his Soldier. Sergeant First Class Monti’s acts of heroism inspired the patrol to fight off the larger enemy force. Sergeant First Class Monti's immeasurable courage and uncommon valor were in keeping with the highest traditions of military service and reflect great credit upon himself, 3d Squadron 71st Cavalry Regiment, the 3d Brigade Combat Team, the 10th Mountain Division (Light Infantry), and the United States Army.

== Other honors ==
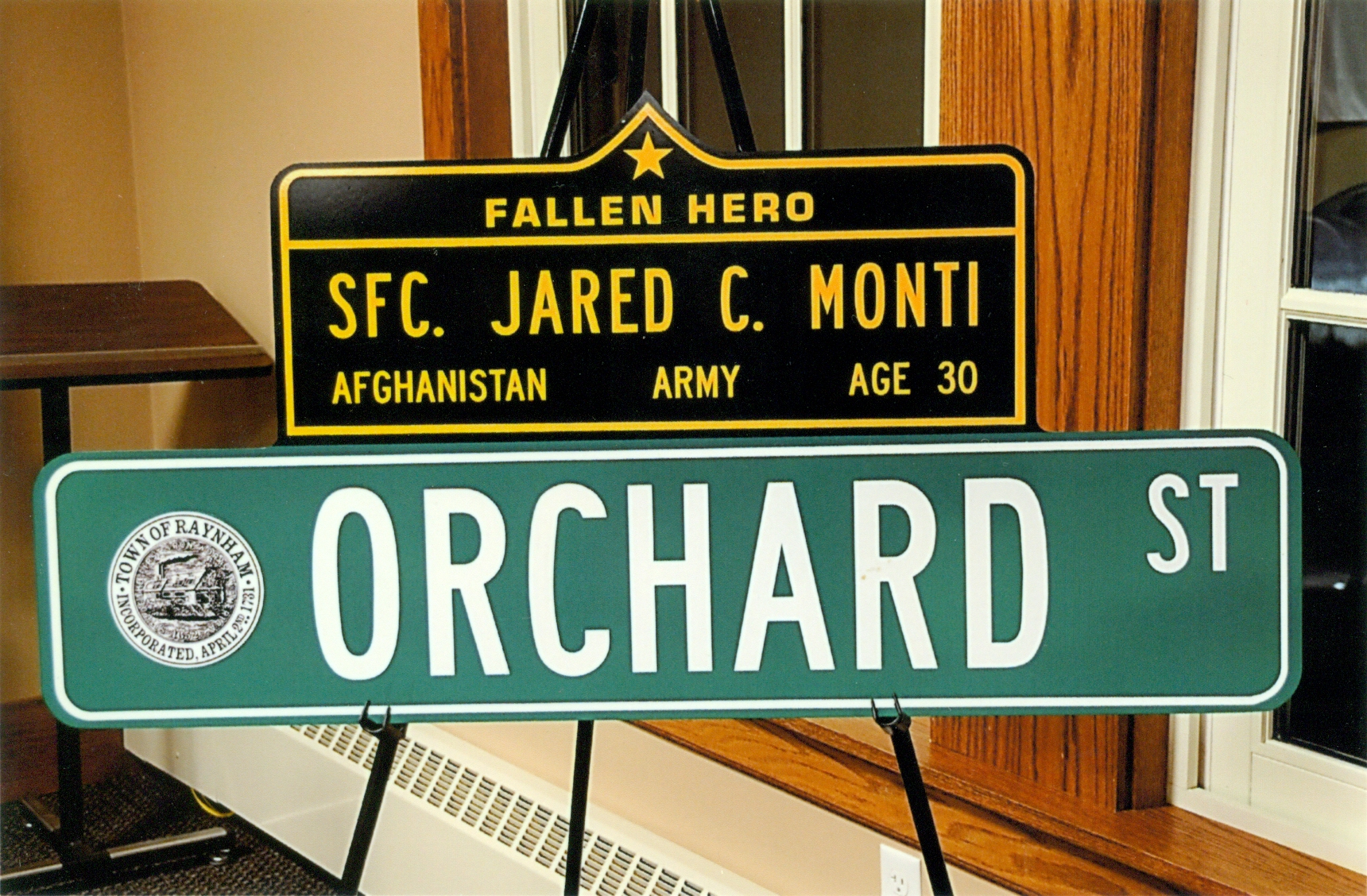
A street marker in Raynham bears Monti's name

On January 13, 2009, Marc R. Pacheco submitted a petition to the Commonwealth of Massachusetts to designate a state owned bridge in the town of Raynham as the SFC Jared C. Monti Bridge. The motion passed and the state Senate approved for the bridge to be renamed.

A call-for-fire training facility at Fort Sill, Oklahoma, where Monti trained, is named in his honor.

The former Pine Plains Fitness Center on Fort Drum has been renamed the Monti Fitness Facility in honor of SFC Jared C. Monti.

In May 2013, Connie Harrington, songwriter of Lee Brice's number one country hit "I Drive Your Truck," revealed that she wrote the song after listening to Monti's father, Paul, on the public radio program Here & Now. It was Paul Monti's answer to Here & Now when asked what he did to reconnect with his son's memory.

== See also ==
- List of post-Vietnam War Medal of Honor recipients

== Sources ==
- Bender, Bryan, "He could not leave a comrade behind", Boston Globe, September 6, 2009.
- Cahn, Dianna (September 17, 2009). "Jared Monti’s soldiers watched him give his life, and it changed theirs", Stars and Stripes, .
- Cavallaro, Gina (July 23, 2009). "Fallen soldier to receive Medal of Honor". Army Times. Archived from the original on August 6, 2009.
- "Defense link casualty report". DoD Identifies Army Casualties. Office of the Assistant Secretary of Defense (Public Affairs). June 23, 2006. Archived from the original on August 26, 2006.
- "GI to Get MoH for Valor in Afghanistan". Stars and Stripes. July 25, 2009.
- "Obama to award first Medal of Honor". The Oval: Tracking the Obama presidency. USA Today. July 24, 2009.
- Phillips, Michael M., "Soldier To Receive Medal of Honor", Wall Street Journal, September 17, 2009.
- "President Obama To Award Medal of Honor". whitehouse.gov. July 24, 2009 – via National Archives.
- "Raynham's Jared C. Monti awarded Congressional Medal of Honor posthumously". Wicked local Raynham news. Gatehouse Media, Inc. July 23, 2009. Archived from the original on November 8, 2012.
- "SFC Jared C. Monti—A Redleg Hero" (PDF). FIRES Bulletin. United States Army. March–April 2009.
- Weinstein, Susan Parkou (July 23, 2009). "Raynham's Jared C. Monti posthumously awarded Congressional Medal of Honor". The Daily News Tribune.
- "White House press release". Statements and Releases. White House, Office of the Press Secretary. July 24, 2009.
