= Massachusetts National Cemetery =

Veterans cemetery in Barnstable County, Massachusetts

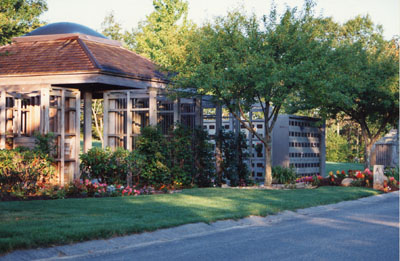
- Committal Shelter in the Cemetery
- Interactive map of Massachusetts National Cemetery

Details
- Established: 1973
- Location: Bourne, Massachusetts
- Country: United States
- Coordinates: 41°40′23″N 70°35′00″W
- Type: Public
- Owned by: United States Department of Veterans Affairs
- Size: 749.3 acres (303.2 ha)
- No. of graves: >78,000 as of 2021
- Website: VA Official Site
- Find a Grave: Massachusetts National Cemetery

Massachusetts National Cemetery is a U.S. National Cemetery located in Bourne, Massachusetts, in Barnstable County on Cape Cod, approximately 65 miles (105 km) southeast of Boston, Massachusetts and adjacent to the Otis Air National Guard Base. As of 2021, over 78,000 have been interred there.

== History ==
On June 18, 1973, Congress passed the National Cemetery Act which transferred 82 of the United States Army’s national cemeteries to the Veteran's Administration (VA). The following year, the VA’s National Cemetery System adopted the regional cemetery concept plan in which one large national cemetery would be built within each of the 10 standard federal regions, as established by the General Services Administration. A policy was established that new cemeteries would only be created on land already owned by the federal government.

During the mid-1970s, when the National Cemetery System was looking to expand, it determined that the largest veteran population in the northeast was centered in the Boston area. A search soon commenced to find a suitable site for a national cemetery, nearby. The difficult task of locating land which would be available to the government at no cost eventually led to the identification of a 749-acre (303 ha) tract on the 22,000-acre (8,900 ha) Otis Air Force Base as the most likely site. The base occupied land that was leased to the Department of Defense (DOD). A portion of this lease was terminated and the title for 749.29 acres (303.23 ha) was transferred to the VA’s National Cemetery System in 1976. The Otis tract became the first parcel of land acquired by the National Cemetery System for the specific purpose of building a new national cemetery since 1949.

The Massachusetts National Cemetery was dedicated on October 11, 1980 and became the third new national cemetery to open in nearly 30 years. Calverton N.C. in New York, and Riverside N.C. in California, were the first and second, respectively. The site was officially named the Veterans Administration National Cemetery of Bourne, Mass., but over time the lengthy appellation changed in practice, if not in fact, to simply, "Massachusetts National Cemetery".

== Monuments and memorials ==
Massachusetts National Cemetery has a memorial trail where, as of February 2005, 47 memorials and a carillon have been erected in memory of veterans from World War I to the modern era.

== Notable persons ==
=== Medal of Honor recipients ===
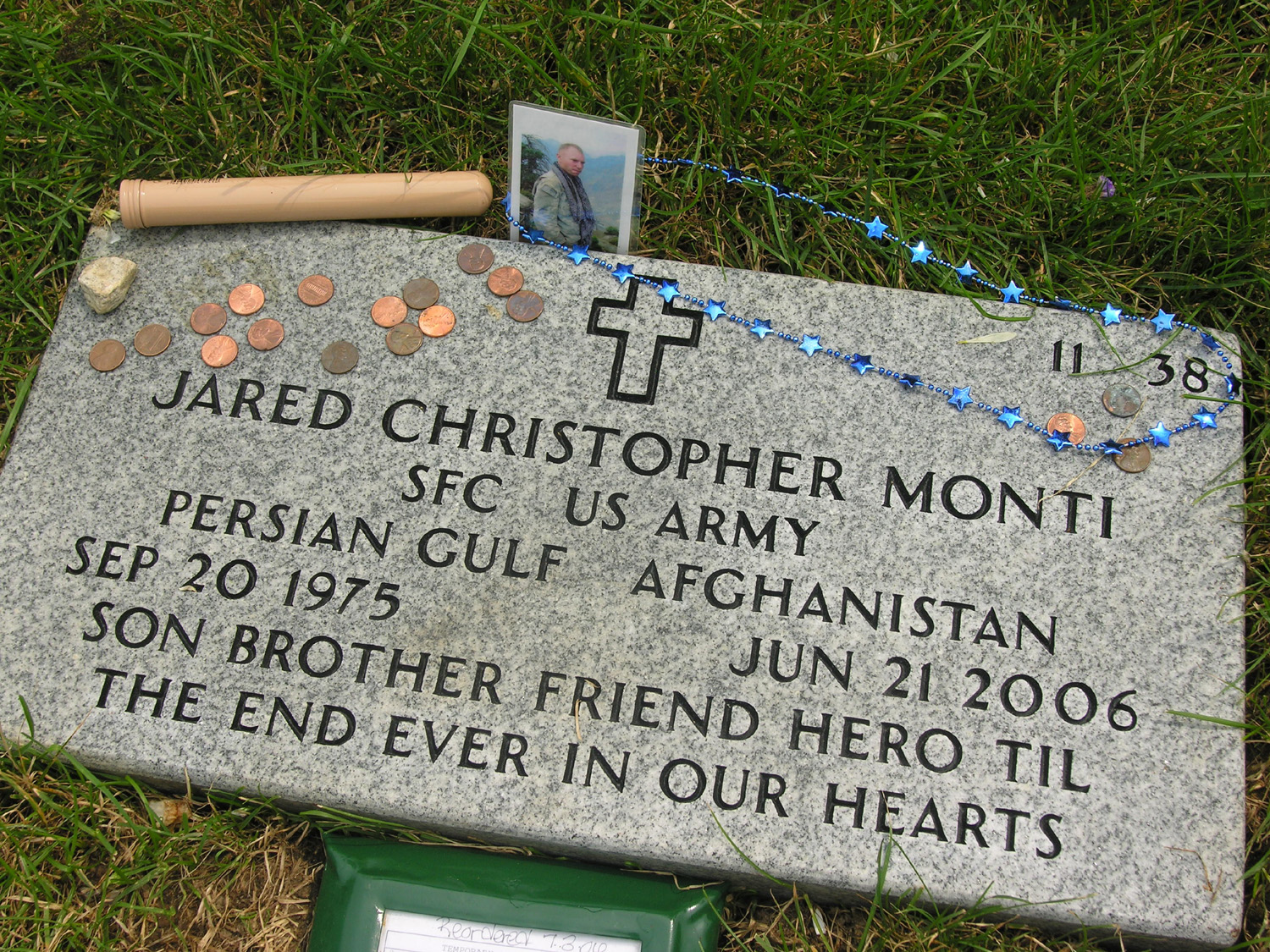
SFC Jared C. Monti at Massachusetts National Cemetery

- Hospital Corpsman Richard D. DeWert, USNR (1931–1951). Killed during the Korean War, while attached to the 2nd Battalion 7th Marines. Originally buried in Korea, DeWert was re-interred at the Woodlawn National Cemetery, Elmira, NY, on October 15, 1951. Subsequently, his family wished to have him interred in his native state. DeWert was disinterred from the Woodlawn Cemetery in 1987, and re-interred in the Massachusetts National Cemetery.
- SFC Jared C. Monti, United States Army (1975–2006). Killed on June 21, 2006, during Operation Enduring Freedom.

=== Other burials ===
- Fred J. Christensen (1921–2006). World War II Flying ace
- Ken Coleman (1925–2003). Sports broadcaster
- John "Red" Flaherty (1917-1999), Major League Baseball umpire
- James A. Goodson (1921–2014). World War II Flying ace
- Frank “Bucko” Kilroy (1921–2007). Professional football player
- Annabelle Lyon (1916–2011). Ballerina
- Eddie Pellagrini (1918–2006). Major League Baseball player
- Charles Sweeney (1919–2004). US Army Air Forces pilot who flew the B-29 Superfortress Bockscar carrying the Fat Man atomic bomb to Nagasaki on August 9, 1945
- John J. Voll (1922–1987). Top US Army Air Force flying ace of the World War II Mediterranean Theater of Operations
- Gordon Willis (1931–2014). Cinematographer
- Unknown Union Soldiers. Interred in 2007. The remains were unearthed during highway excavation in South Carolina in the 1980s. They were identified as members of the "Massachusetts Volunteer Infantry" by the buttons from their uniforms.
