= Goshen, Ohio =

- Census-designated place
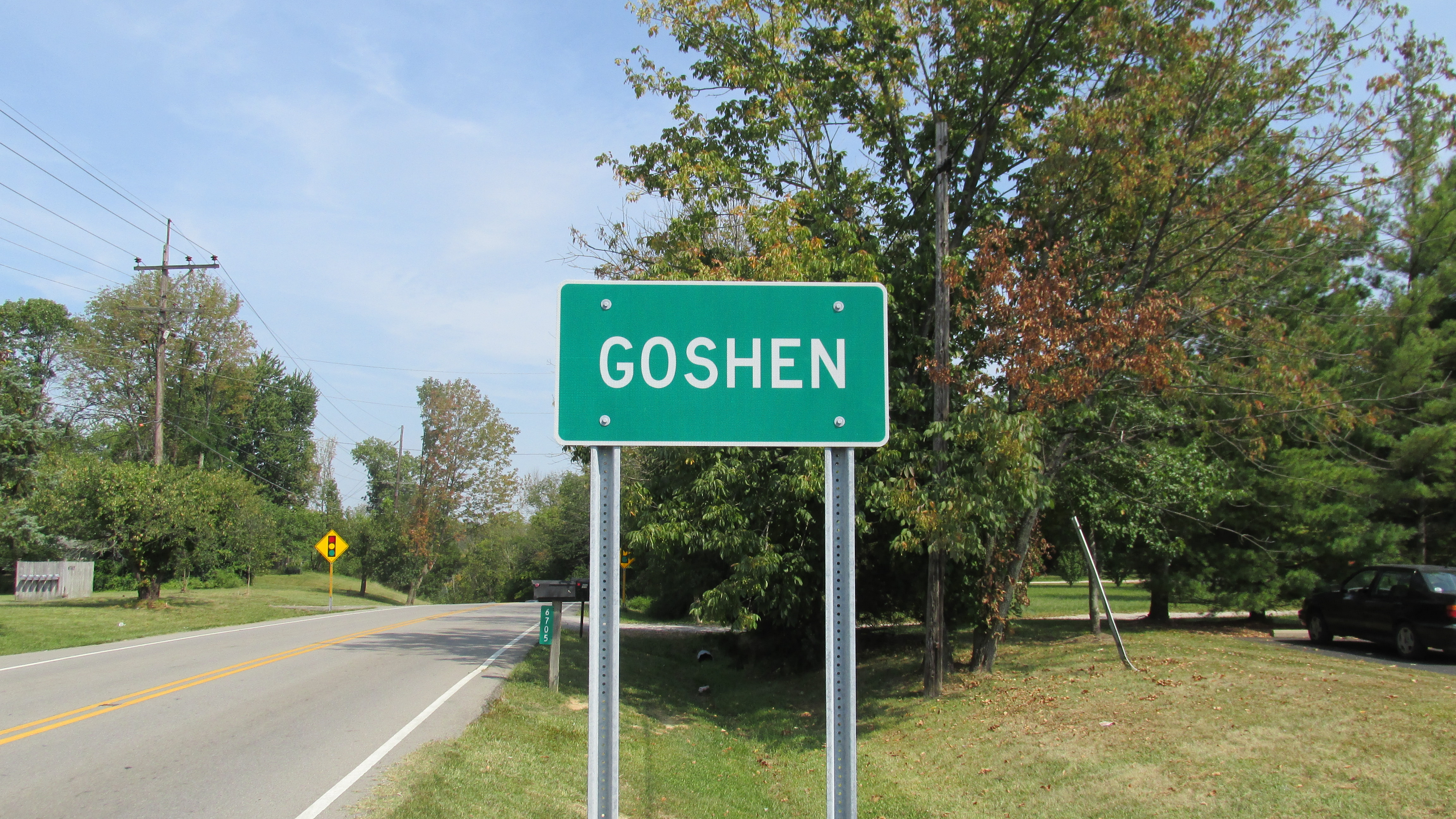
- Goshen community sign

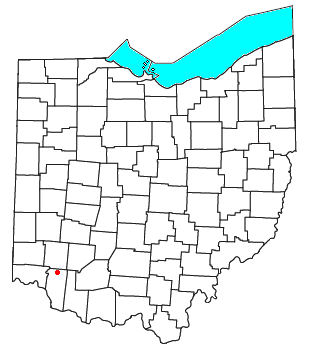
- Location of Goshen, Ohio
- Coordinates: 39°13′57″N 84°09′12″W
- Country: United States
- State: Ohio
- County: Clermont
- Township: Goshen
- Elevation: 843 ft (257 m)

Population (2020)
  - Total: 715
- Time zone: UTC-5 (Eastern (EST))
  - Summer (DST): UTC-4 (EDT)
- Area code: 513
- GNIS feature ID: 2628897

Goshen (/ˈɡoʊʃən/ GOH-shən) is a census-designated place in central Goshen Township, Clermont County, Ohio, United States. The population was 715 at the 2020 census. It is centered on State Route 28 (especially where it overlaps with State Routes 132 and 48), approximately midway between Milford and Blanchester.

== History ==
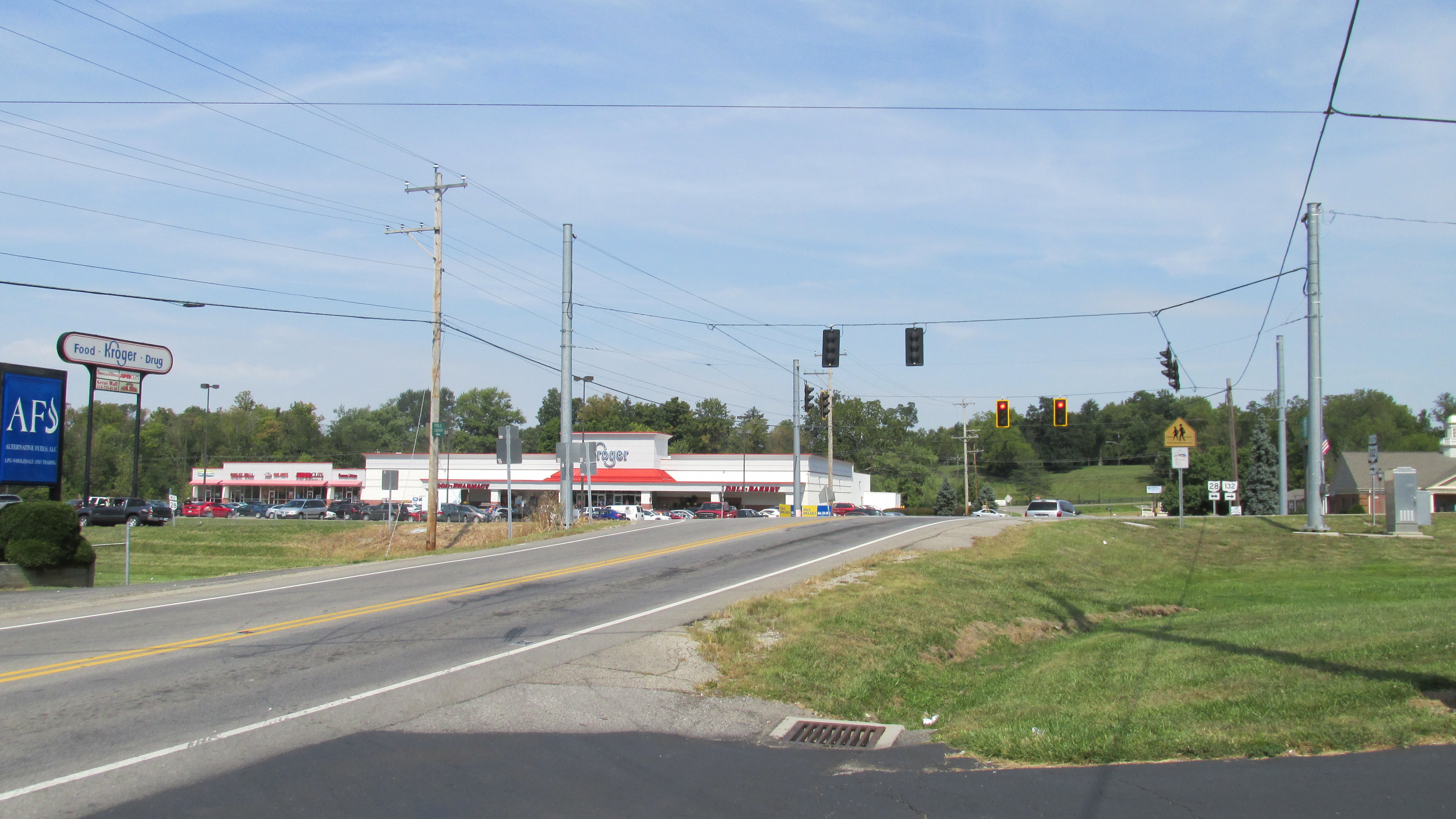
Intersection of Ohio Highways 28 and 132 in Goshen.

Goshen was founded in 1799 by German and English settlers, namely Jacob Myers, and most of whom had migrated down the Ohio River from western Pennsylvania after fighting for the Colonies during the American Revolutionary War.

== 2022 tornado ==
On July 6, 2022, an EF2 tornado struck the town's center, causing damage to multiple buildings including the Fire Department station, resulting in officials declaring a state of emergency. The National Centers for Environmental Information stated the tornado caused $3 million (2022 USD) in damage.

== Education ==
Goshen has a public library, a branch of the Clermont County Public Library.

Goshen Local School District has four schools:

- Goshen High School
- Goshen Middle School
- Spaulding Elementary School
- Marr-Cook Elementary School

== Notable people ==
- Sam Leever – Major League baseball player
- John J. Voll – fighter pilot
