= Sam Leever =

American baseball player (1871–1953)

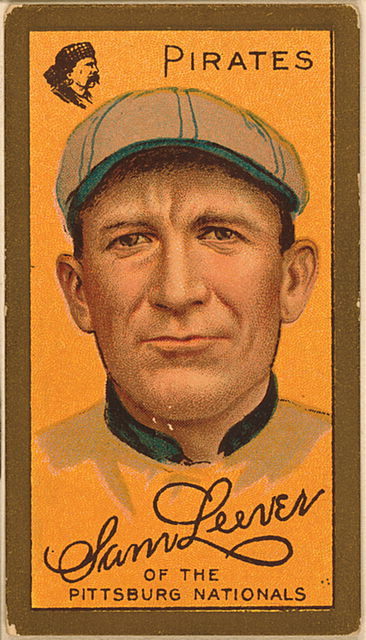
- Pitcher
- Born: December 23, 1871; Goshen, Ohio, U.S.
- Died: May 19, 1953 (aged 81); Goshen, Ohio, U.S.
- Batted: Right Threw: Right

MLB debut
- May 26, 1898, for the Pittsburgh Pirates

Last MLB appearance
- September 26, 1910, for the Pittsburgh Pirates

MLB statistics
- Win–loss record: 194–100
- Earned run average: 2.47
- Strikeouts: 847
- Stats at Baseball Reference

Teams
- Pittsburgh Pirates (1898–1910)

Career highlights and awards
- World Series champion (1909); NL ERA leader (1903)

Samuel Leever (December 23, 1871 – May 19, 1953), nicknamed "the Goshen Schoolmaster", was an American right-handed pitcher in Major League Baseball. He spent his entire career with the Pittsburgh Pirates.

== Early life ==
Sam Leever was born in Goshen, Ohio, the fourth child of Edward Leever, a farmer, and Ameredith Andelia (née Watson) Leever. He graduated from Goshen High School, and then became a teacher there for several years.

== Professional baseball career ==
Leever's first year in the Major Leagues was 1898 at age 26, making his debut on May 26 against the Washington Senators. Of that debut, the Pittsburgh Post-Gazette wrote, "The interest of the 1,300 spectators was largely centered in the work of Leever, who had his first chance in a championship game. Leever is a big, strong fellow, who has plenty of speed and some good curves to help out in a pinch ... He is not afraid to put the ball over the plate." That year he pitched in 5 games for the Pirates. However, the following year he led the National League in games pitched with 51 and in innings pitched with 379 as he posted a record of 21–23. In 1901 and 1905 he led the league in winning percentage (14–5 and 20–5, respectively), as well as in 1903, when he had his best season, going 25–7 with a league-leading 2.06 earned run average (ERA).

In 1903 Leever also led the Pirates to their third consecutive National League pennant. However he injured his shoulder late in the season and was ineffective in the first-ever World Series, losing both of his starts as the Pirates were defeated by Boston.

Leever later went 8–1 for the 1909 Pirates, when they won their first World Series title. His lifetime ERA was 2.47, and he had a 194–100 record, 847 strikeouts, 39 shutouts, 241 complete games, 587 walks, and only 29 home runs allowed in 2,660.2 innings.

As a hitter, Leever posted a .184 batting average (183-for-993) with 90 runs, 17 doubles, 14 triples, 2 home runs, 78 runs batted in, and 49 bases on balls.

== Personal life ==
Sam Leever married Margaret Leever in 1903 when he was 32 and she was 18. They had no children. He died in 1953 at age 81 in Batavia, Ohio near his hometown of Goshen. His wife Margaret died in 1959. They are buried in Goshen Cemetery.

== See also ==
- List of Major League Baseball annual ERA leaders
- List of Major League Baseball annual shutout leaders
- List of Major League Baseball annual saves leaders
- List of Major League Baseball career ERA leaders
- List of Major League Baseball career WHIP leaders
- List of Major League Baseball players who spent their entire career with one franchise
