= John J. Voll =

American flying ace

John James Voll
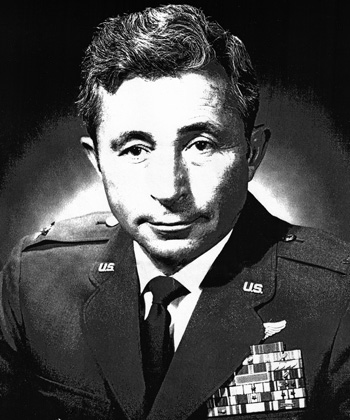
- Born: May 3, 1922; Cincinnati, Ohio, U.S.
- Died: September 12, 1987 (aged 65)
- Burial place: Massachusetts National Cemetery
- Military career
- Allegiance: United States
- Branch: United States Air Force
- Service years: 1942–1974
- Rank: Colonel
- Units: 31st Fighter Group; 6250th Support Squadron
- Commands: 522d Tactical Fighter Squadron; 77th Aeronautical Systems Wing
- Conflicts: World War II; Vietnam War
- Awards: Distinguished Service Cross; Silver Star (2); Distinguished Flying Cross (2); Bronze Star Medal; Meritorious Service Medal; Air Medal (30)

John James Voll (May 3, 1922 – September 12, 1987) was an American career officer in the United States Air Force and a World War II flying ace. He flew P-51 Mustangs with the 308th Fighter Squadron of the 31st Fighter Group. He was the third highest scoring P-51 Mustang ace of the war, and the top USAAF ace of the Mediterranean Theater of Operations and Fifteenth Air Force, with 21 aerial victories.

== Early life ==
Voll was born on May 3, 1922, in Cincinnati, Ohio, the oldest of five children. John later moved to Goshen, where he and his siblings all attended school and graduated from high school in 1940. In 1943, Voll entered Miami University. The 1943 edition of the Miami Recensio includes pictures of Voll on the Miami freshman football team.

== Military career ==
Voll enlisted in the Air Corps Reserve on August 5, 1942, and finally began Aviation Cadet training on March 8, 1943. He graduated from pilot training on January 7, 1944.

=== World War II ===
After completing P-47 Thunderbolt training, he joined the 308th Fighter Squadron of 31st Fighter Group in May 1944. His first mission was a bomber escort over Italy.

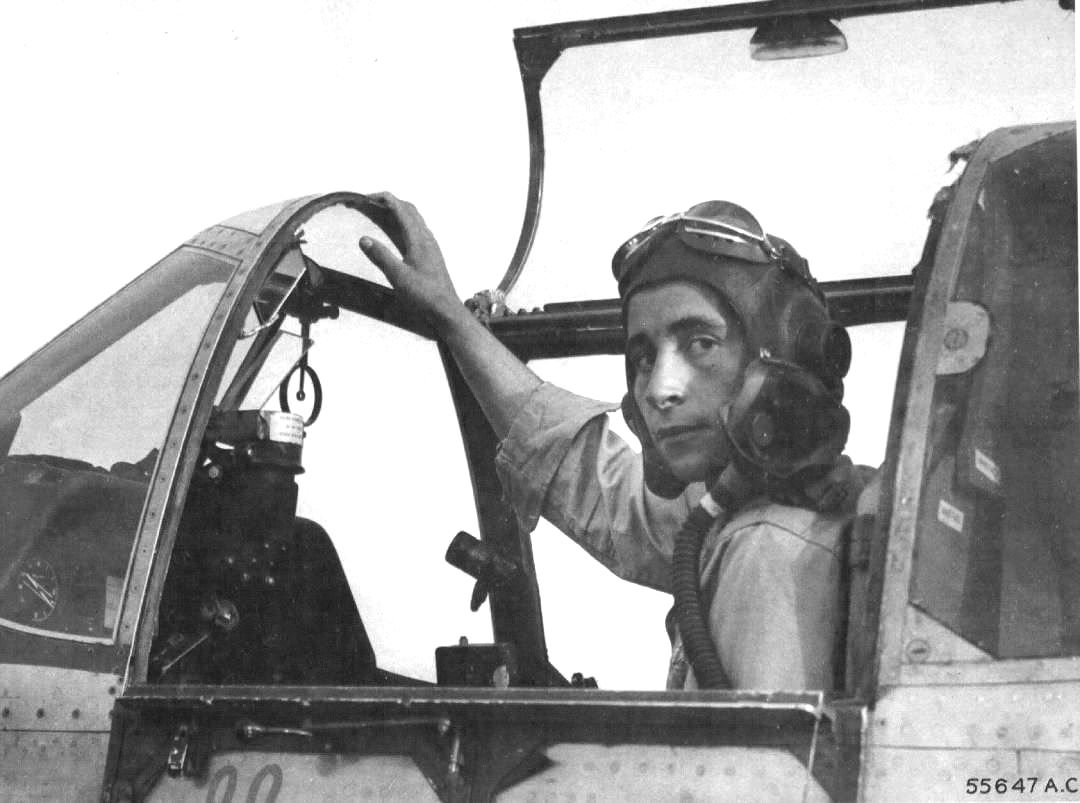
Capt. Voll in his P-51 Mustang

Voll's first kill was a Focke-Wulf Fw 190 on June 23 on a mission over Ploiești. On August 17, 1944, over Romania, while escorting B-24s on a bombing mission against the Ploiești oil refineries, a squadron mate of then Lieutenant Voll was forced to bail out near the Danube River. After covering his friend until he safely reached the ground, Voll pulled away from the crash site and spotted three Bf 109s. In the fierce air battle that ensued, Voll tallied two enemy fighters destroyed and one probable.

Flying a P-51D named "American Beauty," Voll's final victories occurred during a spectacular, individual effort. While leading an escort mission to Munich on 16 November 1944, Captain Voll experienced electrical problems and left the formation. As he returned alone, he spotted a single Junkers Ju 88 over Udine, Italy. Chasing the German aircraft as it attempted to return to its base, Voll was suddenly jumped by 12 Bf 109s and Fw 190s. He quickly shot down the Ju 88 and turned into the enemy fighters. In a swirling, five-minute battle, John Voll destroyed two Fw 190s, one Bf 109, had two probables, and two damaged, making him one of the 38 Army Air Force "ace in a day" pilots. He ended the war with 21 air-to-air kills, all while flying the P-51 Mustang.

After leaving the Mediterranean Theater of Operations, Captain Voll was sent to China as a headquarters staff officer in the Chinese-American Composite Wing. When the war ended, he was discharged from the military.

=== Cold War career ===
After World War II, Voll returned to Goshen and became the high school science teacher at his alma mater. He taught two years before being recalled to active duty in 1948. He served with the 3525th Pilot Training Wing at Williams Air Force Base until October 1949. During that time, he married Joan Koch. In preparation for a transfer to the 66th Fighter Interceptor Squadron at Elmendorf Air Force Base, he took three weeks of jet engine training at the Allison Division of General Motors in Indianapolis.

Voll served with the 66th Fighter Interceptor Squadron until October 1951, and then was assigned to the 1002nd Inspector General Group at Norton Air Force Base, where he served as a Power Plant Specialist and Inspector until August 1954, when he attended Air Command and Staff College, graduating in June 1955. Voll then served with Air Defense Command at Hamilton Air Force Base from July 1955 to November 1958 – at one point being called away to open the Sicily–Rome American Cemetery and Memorial in Italy. Later he was assigned to the Air Force Advisory Group at Kimpo Air Base, where he served until November 1960.

From November 1960 to October 1961, Voll served with the 27th Tactical Fighter Wing at Cannon Air Force Base. He then served as the Commander of the 522nd Tactical Fighter Squadron, also at Cannon Air Force Base, from October 1961 to July 1962, when he was assigned as an Operations Staff Officer for the 832nd Air Division at Cannon Air Force Base. Voll's next assignment was with Headquarters Tactical Air Command at Langley Air Force Base, where he served from October 1962 to August 1964. He then attended Naval Warfare School, graduating in June 1965. From July 1965 to June 1966, he went through air attaché training and then was assigned as Air Attaché to Singapore from June 1966 to July 1968.

Voll served as the Chief of the Plans Division for the 6250th Support Squadron of Seventh Air Force at Tan Son Nhut Air Base in the Republic of Vietnam from July 1968 to August 1969. He was instrumental in implementing Operation Rolling Thunder. He then completed Armed Forces Staff College, graduating in June 1970. From November 1970 until May 1973, he was the director of operations for the 313th Air Division on Okinawa. Voll's final assignment was as commander of the 77th Aeronautical Systems Wing at McClellan Air Force Base from October 1973 until his retirement from the Air Force on July 31, 1974.

== Later life ==
Voll and his wife Joan, who was from Blanchester, Ohio, had two children. After retiring, they lived in Lexington, Massachusetts. Voll died on September 12, 1987, and is buried at the Massachusetts National Cemetery. His wife, Joan died on July 28, 1999, and is buried next to him.

== Military decorations ==
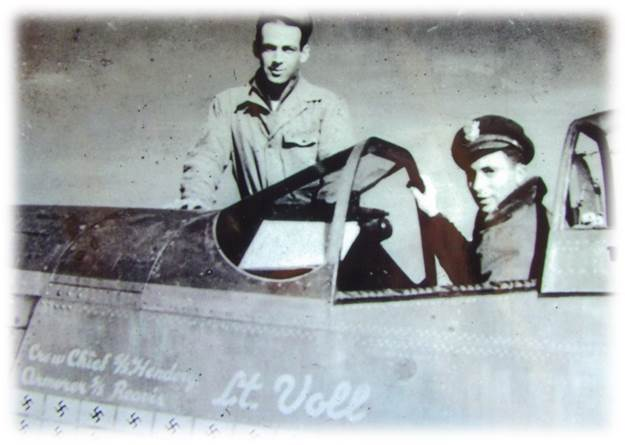
Voll sits in the cockpit of his P-51 Mustang with his crew chief.

Voll's military decorations and awards include:

Command pilot badge
Distinguished Service Cross
Silver Star with bronze oak leaf cluster
Distinguished Flying Cross with bronze oak leaf cluster
Bronze Star Medal
Meritorious Service Medal
Air Medal with four silver oak leaf clusters
Air Medal with one silver and three bronze oak leaf clusters (second ribbon required for accouterment spacing)
Air Force Presidential Unit Citation
Air Force Outstanding Unit Award with bronze oak leaf cluster
American Campaign Medal
European-African-Middle Eastern Campaign Medal with one silver and two bronze campaign stars
Asiatic-Pacific Campaign Medal with bronze campaign star
World War II Victory Medal
National Defense Service Medal with service star
Vietnam Service Medal with two bronze campaign stars
Korea Defense Service Medal
Air Force Longevity Service Award with one silver and one bronze oak leaf clusters
Small Arms Expert Marksmanship Ribbon
Vietnam Armed Forces Honor Medal, 1st Class
Vietnam Gallantry Cross Unit Citation
Vietnam Campaign Medal

=== Distinguished Service Cross citation ===
Voll, John J.
Captain, U.S Army Air Forces
308th Fighter Squadron, 31st Fighter Group, 15th Air Force
Date of Action: November 16, 1944
Headquarters, European Theater of Operations, U.S. Army, General Orders No. 61 (1944)

Citation

Captain (Air Corps) John J. Voll, United States Army Air Forces, was awarded the Distinguished Service Cross for extraordinary heroism in connection with military operations against an armed enemy while serving as Pilot of a P-51 Fighter Airplane in the 308th Fighter Squadron, 31st Fighter Group, 15th Air Force, in aerial combat against enemy forces on 16 November 1944, in the European Theater of Operations. After destroying a JU 88 in the Udine area, Captain Voll was jumped by a dozen enemy fighters. Despite being heavily outnumbered, he remained in the fight, shooting down four more enemy to become an ace in a day. Captain Voll's unquestionable valor in aerial combat is in keeping with the highest traditions of the military service and reflects great credit upon himself, the 15th Air Force, and the United States Army Air Forces.

== Bibliography ==
- Scutts, Jerry (1995). Mustang aces of the Ninth & Fifteenth Air Forces & the RAF. Osprey Aerospace. ISBN 1855325837. OCLC 34113576.
