= Alyson Richman =

American writer

- Education: Wellesley College
- Occupation: Novelist
- Writing career
- Notable work: The Lost Wife
- Website: www.alysonrichman.com

Alyson Richman is an American writer best known for The Lost Wife, a tale of a husband and wife who are separated in a concentration camp during World War II and reunited 60 years later at their grandchildren's wedding. Her novels have been published in more than 25 languages and have received both national and international acclaim.

== Background ==
Richman graduated from Wellesley College in 1994 and received a Thomas J. Watson Fellowship. She currently lives with her husband and two children on Long Island, New York.

== Bibliography ==
- The Mask Carver's Son: A Novel (Bloomsbury 2001)
- The Rhythm of Memory (formerly entitled Swedish Tango: A Novel) (Simon & Schuster 2004)
- The Last Van Gogh: A Novel (Berkley 2006)
- The Lost Wife (Berkley 2012)
- Saint-Exupéry
- The Garden of Letters (Berkley 2014)
- The Velvet Hours (Berkley 2016)
- The Secret of Clouds (Berkley 2019)
- The Thread Collectors (2022)
- The Friday Night Club (2023)
- The Time Keepers (2024)
- The Missing Pages (2025)
