= Mansfield Correctional Institution =

Prison in Ohio, United States

Coordinates: 40°47′31″N 82°30′33″W

- Interactive map of Mansfield Correctional Institution
- Location: 1150 North Main Street Mansfield, Ohio
- Status: open
- Security class: mixed security
- Capacity: 2523
- Opened: 1990
- Managed by: Ohio Department of Rehabilitation and Correction
- Director: Timothy McConahay

Mansfield Correctional Institution (MANCI) is an Ohio Department of Rehabilitation and Correction mixed-security state prison for men, located at 1150 North Main Street in Mansfield, Ohio, adjacent to the property of the historic Ohio State Reformatory. Ohio's Richland Correctional Institution is also located in Mansfield.

The facility opened in 1990 and has a capacity of 2,523 inmates. In 2005 the state's death row inmates were transferred from Mansfield to the Ohio State Penitentiary in Youngstown, Ohio. Those inmates have since been moved to Chillicothe Correctional Institution.

In July 2013 prisoner James David Myers engineered an escape, using three ladders to scale security fences. He was caught the next day. Four correctional employees were fired in relation to the escape, for infractions ranging from falsifying inventory documents to failing to respond to fence alarms.

== Notable inmates ==
Robert Rembert: Serial killer
