= John Parsons (criminal) =

American criminal

FBI Ten Most Wanted Fugitive
- Charges: Unlawful Flight to Avoid Prosecution - Escape; Aggravated murder; Aggravated robbery; Weapons under disability; Tampering with evidence; 2 counts of Grand Theft Auto
- Reward: US$100,000
- Alias: Chad Johnson; Mike Woolum; John Warren Parsons; Warren Parsons; John Ward Parsons

Description
- Born: John Warren Parsons; February 11, 1971 (age 55); Chillicothe, Ohio, US
- Race: White
- Gender: Male
- Height: 5 ft 10 in (178 cm)
- Weight: 180 lb (82 kg)

Status
- Added: September 30, 2006
- Caught: October 19, 2006
- Number: 484
- Captured

John Warren Parsons (born February 11, 1971) is an American criminal from Chillicothe, Ohio. He escaped from prison and was caught on October 19, 2006. He was wanted for an unlawful flight to avoid prosecution, escape, aggravated murder, aggravated robbery, weapons under disability, tampering with evidence and grand theft.

== Murder ==
Parsons was facing capital charges for the April 21, 2005, murder of Chillicothe Police Officer Larry R. Cox following a gas station robbery. On that evening, Chillicothe police responded to a report of a car being stolen from a restaurant. Just 15 minutes later, chased by a Chillicothe police officer, the suspect bailed out of the car and took off running. At around 6 pm, as he walked from his parents' house to his own, off-duty Officer Larry Cox also took up the foot chase, and confronted the robber in an alleyway near Chestnut and North High streets. Cox was shot and killed in the alley. Several clues led investigators to John Parsons, whom police arrested July 10, 2005, and charged with the killing. He pleaded guilty and was given life in prison.

== Escape ==
Parsons escaped from the Ross County jail on Saturday, July 29, 2006. He asked his mother for help in escaping, but she was arrested before plans could be made. Parsons made a rope from bed-sheets, newspaper and toilet paper, which he hid behind a brick in the wall of his cell. He used toothpaste and green and blue Jolly Ranchers to match the paint on the wall to disguise the broken mortar around the loose brick, which Parsons had carved out with a piece of metal from an air vent in his jail cell.

As a fugitive, he was twice featured on the Fox television show America's Most Wanted. He appeared for a third time on that program on September 30, 2006, when he became the 484th fugitive listed on the FBI Ten Most Wanted Fugitives list. After his escape there were numerous reported sightings of Parsons in heavily wooded areas near Chillicothe.

National Geographic Channel transmitted the history of the escape in episode 6 of the documentary show Breakout.

== Captured ==
On October 19, 2006, Parsons was arrested without incident by members of the Ross County Tactical Assault Team at approximately 12:20 pm at a small shack near the Chillicothe city limits. A number of law enforcement tactical units converged on the location and planned the arrest to avoid injury to any law enforcement personnel or to Parsons. After being booked into the Ross County jail, Parsons was transferred to the Pickaway Correctional Institution in Orient, southwest of Columbus.

Parsons, who led local, state and national law enforcement on a three-month chase after his escape, stood before Judge Jon Corzine in Ross County Common Pleas Court shortly after 3 pm and pleaded guilty to one count of aggravated murder and other charges. He was sentenced to life in prison without parole. He was involved in telling the story of the escape with the National Geographic Channel.

As of April 2026, Parsons is incarcerated at the Toledo Correctional Institution.
