= Trumbull Correctional Institution =

Prison in Ohio, United States

Coordinates: 41°13′53″N 80°53′10″W

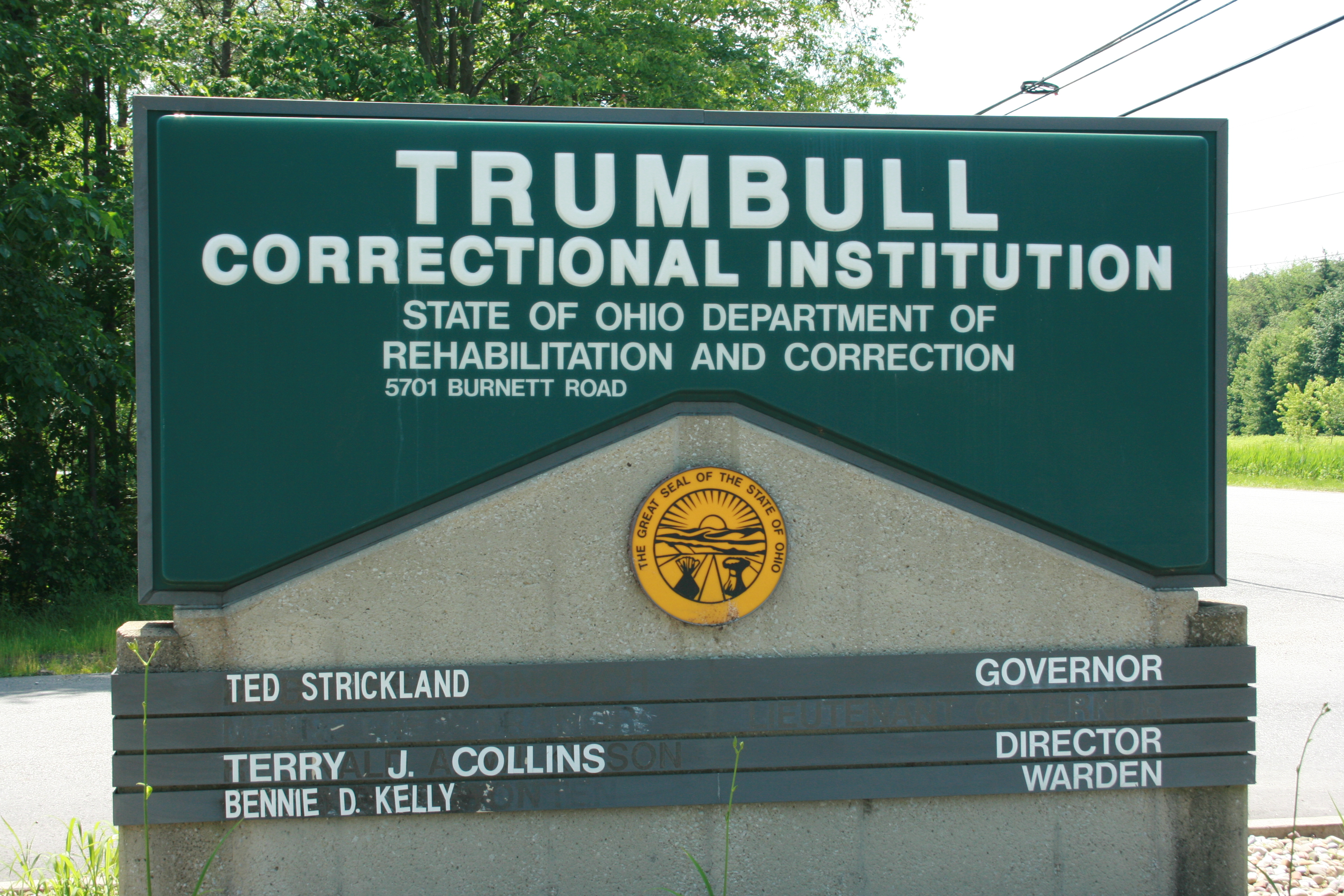
- Interactive map of Trumbull Correctional Institution
- Location: 5701 Burnett Road Leavittsburg, Ohio
- Status: mixed
- Capacity: 1529
- Opened: 1992
- Managed by: Ohio Department of Rehabilitation and Correction

The Trumbull Correctional Institution is a medium-security prison for men located in Leavittsburg, Trumbull County, Ohio and operated by the Ohio Department of Rehabilitation and Correction. The facility first opened in 1992 and has a population of 1,529 state inmates, with mixed minimum, medium, and close (maximum) security levels.

== Notable inmates ==
Art Schlichter - Former Quarterback for the Ohio State Buckeyes, Incarcerated for gambling related fraud charges.

Daniel Petric - Perpetrator of the murder of Susan Petric and attempted murder of Mark Petric, transferred from Lorain Correctional Institution

Bennie Adams - Convicted of the murder, rape, and kidnapping of Gina Tenney. Originally sentenced to death but was re-sentenced and transferred from Chillicothe Correctional Institution.

Christian Fuhr - Convicted double murderer
