= Disappearance of Timmothy Pitzen =

Disappearance of an American child in 2011

Timmothy Pitzen
- Undated photograph of Pitzen
- Born: Timmothy James Pitzen; October 18, 2004; Aurora, Illinois, U.S.
- Disappeared: May 13, 2011 (aged 6); Wisconsin Dells, Wisconsin, U.S.
- Status: Missing for 15 years, 6 months and 6 days
- Education: Greenman Elementary School
- Parents: James Pitzen (father); Amy Fry-Pitzen (mother)

On May 11, 2011, six-year-old American boy Timmothy James Pitzen (/ˈpɪtsən/) was dropped off at school in Aurora, Illinois, by his father James Pitzen. He was picked up shortly after by his mother, Amy Fry-Pitzen, who took him on a three-day trip to various amusement and water parks. Fry-Pitzen's body was subsequently found in a motel room in the city of Rockford, Illinois, having died by suicide, with a note stating that Timmothy was safe but would never be found.

== Background ==
Timmothy Pitzen was born in Aurora, Illinois, on October 18, 2004, as the only child of James Pitzen and Amy Joan Marie Fry-Pitzen. On Wednesday, May 11, 2011, Timmothy's father dropped him off at his kindergarten class at Greenman Elementary School. His mother checked him out of class between 8:10 and 8:15 a.m. CDT, citing a non-existent family emergency. She dropped her vehicle off at a repair shop at 10:00 a.m. An employee of the shop drove Fry-Pitzen and her son to the Brookfield Zoo. They returned and retrieved their vehicle at 3:00 p.m., and drove to the KeyLime Cove Resort in Gurnee, where they spent the night. On May 12, 2011, the pair drove to Kalahari Resort in Wisconsin Dells, Wisconsin, and were spotted on security footage in the checkout line at 10:00 a.m. the next day. Pitzen has not been seen since.

== Disappearance ==
Between 12:00 PM and 1:30 PM on May 13, 2011, Fry-Pitzen telephoned several family members, including her mother and brother-in-law, telling them that she and Timmothy were safe and not in any danger. Cell phone records indicated the calls were made from an area northwest of Sterling, Illinois, near Route 40. Fry-Pitzen failed to contact her husband, however, who had been attempting to locate the pair after being notified by his son's school that he was not present when he arrived to pick him up at the end of the school day on May 11. Timmothy was heard in the background during the calls, saying that he was hungry.

At 7:25 PM on May 13, 2011, Fry-Pitzen was seen, alone, on security cameras at a Family Dollar store in Winnebago, Illinois, where she purchased a pen, notepaper and envelopes. At 8:00 PM, she was sighted at a Sullivan's Food store in Winnebago, again unaccompanied. At 11:15 PM, she checked into the Rockford Inn at Rockford, Illinois, where sometime that night or the next morning, she took her own life by slashing her wrists and neck and overdosing on antihistamines. At 12:30 PM on May 14, 2011, her body was found by a hotel maid along with a note. In the note, Fry-Pitzen apologized for the mess she had created, and explained that Timmothy would never be found, but was safe with people who would care for him.

== Investigation ==
Police found that the knife Fry-Pitzen had used to kill herself contained only her blood, but that "a concerning amount" of blood found in her car belonged to her son Timmothy. However, a family member later revealed that the stains were likely caused by a nosebleed Timmothy had suffered in the car earlier that month. It was also noted that Fry-Pitzen's cell phone was missing. An examination of her vehicle revealed that it had been parked in a grassy area, possibly near a stream, but close to a highway. In 2013, Fry-Pitzen's cell phone was located beside Route 78, but the discovery did not bring any new evidence, according to police.

James Pitzen has stated that he believes his son is still alive, and was kidnapped by someone that Fry-Pitzen gave him to.

In November 2022, Fry-Pitzen's sister, Kara Jacobs, told NBC that Amy had a history of mental illness and was worried that would interfere with her getting custody of Timmothy in case of divorce, which seemed inevitable. Both Jacobs and Pitzen emphatically refuse to believe in the possibility of murder-suicide.

As of 2026, Pitzen remained missing and the case was still open. The National Center for Missing & Exploited Children published an age-progressed image of Pitzen, with the Center's Director of Communications writing that, "This case lives in a difficult and complicated limbo. While many fear the worst, we can’t ignore the very real possibility that Timmothy is still out there. [...] The thought of him walking around today, totally unaware that his family is desperate to find him, is a possibility that never leaves you."

== National media coverage ==
The Pitzen case was broadcast on the American television series Live PD on August 25, 2018, with guest Angeline Hartmann of the National Center for Missing and Exploited Children showing viewers an age progression photograph of Timmothy at age 13, and on the HLN investigative series Real Life Nightmare (episode "You'll Never Find Him") first airing on December 6, 2020.

== Reappearance hoax ==
On April 3, 2019, local residents in Newport, Kentucky, called the police to report a teenager wandering the streets after running across a bridge over the Ohio River. When police found the shaken and distraught boy, he told them he was Timmothy. The next day, the Louisville office of the FBI revealed via Twitter that the boy in their custody was not Timmothy. Aurora Police spokesman Sgt. Bill Rowley said, "Although we are disappointed that this turned out to be a hoax, we remain diligent in our search for Timmothy, as our missing person's case remains unsolved."

The man who claimed to be Pitzen was found to be 23-year-old Brian Michael Rini. He was released from Belmont Correctional Institution in Ohio less than a month prior to his claim, after serving about fourteen months on charges of burglary and vandalism out of Medina County. He had a history of mental illness and had been diagnosed with Asperger syndrome and bipolar disorder, according to his brother. He was sentenced to two years in prison for the hoax.

== See also ==
- List of people who disappeared mysteriously: post-1970
