= Dellmus Colvin =

American serial killer

- Born: Dellmus Charles Colvin; August 3, 1959 (age 67)
- Status: Incarcerated
- Motive: Misogyny
- Convictions: Ohio; Aggravated murder (four counts); Complicity to aggravated murder (one count); Rape (two counts); New Jersey; Murder
- Penalty: Ohio; Life without parole New Jersey; 30 years

Details
- Victims: 7+ 52 (claimed)
- Span of crimes: 1987–2005
- Country: United States
- States: New Jersey; Ohio
- Date apprehended: November 2005
- Imprisoned at: Ross Correctional Institution

Dellmus Charles Colvin (born August 3, 1959) is an American serial killer who, during his employment as a truck driver, kidnapped and killed at least six women in Ohio and one in New Jersey between 1987 and 2005. He was arrested after a DNA profiling exam exposed his guilt in two of the murders; shortly after, he confessed to the other crimes. He is currently serving six life sentences at the Lebanon Correctional Institution.

== Biography ==
Dellmus Colvin was born on August 3, 1959, and grew up in the countryside of Akron, Ohio. Colvin's childhood was normal. In his teenage years, he began having conflict with his mother, but he did not display signs of aggressive behavior. In high school, Colvin wrestled and played football. After graduating from high school, Dellmus became a driver, after which he worked as a taxi driver in Atlantic City and its various suburbs. In the mid-1980s, he began to show signs of anti-social behavior and had problems with social skills. He was unpopular in the area, and began leading a criminal lifestyle, often preferring to spend time in the company of prostitutes. In the late 1980s, Colvin moved to Ohio, where over the years he lived in the cities of Swanton, Lima, Orient, and Toledo. In 1989, in Summit County, he was arrested on assault charges and illegal weapons possession. He was convicted and sentenced to 15 years imprisonment. Dellmus was paroled in 1992, but was jailed again in July 1993 for violating his parole. Three years later, he was released a second time and moved to Toledo, where he soon found work as a truck driver. In subsequent years, he was seen displaying increasingly impulsive and violent behavior towards women. In April 2004, he was arrested after a woman contacted police, claiming that Colvin kidnapped her from a truck stop, robbing, beating and attempting to rape her, but she managed to escape. During the investigation, a blood and saliva sample was taken from him for DNA testing, in order to see if he had committed any similar crimes in the past.

== Arrest and incarceration ==
In November 2005, based on the results from the DNA analysis, Colvin was charged with the murders of two women: 33-year-old Jackie Simpson and 37-year-old Melissa Weber, who were murdered in Toledo on April 16 and May 9, 2003, respectively. In addition, he was charged with a rape that occurred that same year. In September 2006, Colvin stood trial for the murders. During said trial, the Lucas County Attorney General's Office, which suspected Colvin was responsible for more murders due to his occupation as a truck driver, proposed a plea bargain in exchange for taking the death penalty off the table. Agreeing to the proposal, Dellmus pleaded guilty to the murders of Simpson and Weber, as well as three others. According to his testimony, in January 2000, he lured 38-year-old Valerie Jones into his truck, strangled her, and then dumped her body in Lake Erie, in Ottawa County; on September 1 of that year, he lured 42-year-old Jacquelynn Thomas into his truck's cabin, after which he violated and subsequently killed her. Her body was found the next day in Monroe County. He also killed 43-year-old Lily Summers, whom he had previously offered money in exchange for sex; her body was found in April 2002.

On October 3, 2006, Colvin unexpectedly confessed to another murder. He admitted to his involvement in the murder of 40-year-old Dorothea Wetzel, who was found murdered on August 5, 2000, on the banks of the Maumee River in southern Toledo. During interrogation, Colvin stated that his motive for the killings was misogyny, which was caused by his sexual complexes and inferiority complex. In October of that year, on the basis of the plea bargain, he was given several terms of life imprisonment.

In June 2010, Colvin was charged with the cold case murder of 27-year-old Donna Lee White, who was killed on September 15, 1987, in Atlantic City. Dellmus was extradited to New Jersey, where he appeared before the court in April 2011. During the trial, he pled guilty to White's murder. In his statement, he claimed to have met Donna while working as a taxi driver, after which he made the girl an offer to go to his apartment, where they would drink and have sex, to which she supposedly agreed. A few hours later, Donna began taking drugs, and fainted from an overdose. However, instead of helping her, Colvin strangled her with a plastic bag and then dumped the body on the outskirts of the city.

Based on his testimony, in April 2011, Dellmus Colvin was convicted of White's murder and received an additional 30 years imprisonment, to be served concurrently with his life sentences.

In September 2020, during a telephone conversation with podcaster Phil Chalmers, Colvin claimed that, between 1983 and 2005, he killed 52 girls and women across the United States. To support his claims, he shared details about the murder of a prostitute he committed in 2005 in LaSalle County, Illinois, near Ottawa. According to his testimony, after committing the murder, he dumped the victim's body in an abandoned building located in the small town of Peru. Following Colvin's statement, the LaSalle County Sheriff authorized a search at the designated dump site, resulting in two bones, believed to belong to a woman's skeleton, were found by law enforcement officials. They were subsequently taken to a forensic anthropologist for identification, but found to be non-human.

== See also ==
- List of serial killers in the United States
