= Murders of Eric Joering and Anthony Morelli =

2018 killings of Westerville, Ohio, police officers

- A memorial for officers Anthony Morelli and Eric Joering outside the Westerville Police Department in February 2018
- Date: February 10, 2018
- Location: Westerville, Ohio
- Deaths: 2
- Convicted: Quentin Smith
- Convictions: Aggravated murder & domestic violence
- Sentence: Life in prison without parole

Eric Joering and Anthony "Tony" Morelli were police officers who were murdered on February 10, 2018, in Westerville, Ohio after responding to a domestic violence incident. Joering, 39, and Morelli, 54, were shot and killed by Quentin Smith, who had punched and choked his wife, leading to her making a 9-1-1 hangup call. When the police officers arrived, Smith shot Joering three times in both of his arms and in his head. Morelli was shot once in the chest with the bullet going through his heart and lungs.

Joering, who had been a police officer for 16 years in Westerville, died at the scene, while Morelli, who had been a police officer for 30 years, died later in the hospital. Smith, who was 30 at the time and who was prohibited from having a gun, was shot five times but survived.

Smith had an extensive criminal history involving burglary, intimidation, aggravated menacing, domestic violence, and felonious assault. He was tried in October 2019, and convicted for the murders on November 1, 2019. For perhaps the first time in Ohio, family members of the victims gave victim impact statements to the jury during the sentencing phase of a capital case. The jury recommended that Smith be sentenced to life in prison although some members of the jury reported that their fellow jurors refused to consider the death penalty.

The murders garnered a significant response, with both Governor John Kasich and President Donald Trump commenting on them. Both victims have been remembered in several ways, including by having part of a highway named after them, and by having their cruiser doors displayed in Washington D.C. as part of the National Law Enforcement Officers Memorial for National Police Week.

== Victims ==
Officers Anthony Morelli (left) and Eric Joering (right)

=== Eric Joering ===
Eric Joering (August 6, 1978 – February 10, 2018) was a Westerville Police Officer for 16 years at the time of his death. He graduated from Westerville South High School in 1997 and went on to attend the Columbus State Community College Police Program. He spent his 16 years with the Westerville Police Department working as a patrol officer, a detective, and as a K-9 officer with his dog partner Sam. He was married and had four daughters, Savanah, Ella Elena and Eva.

=== Anthony Morelli ===
Anthony Morelli was born on February 7, 1964, in Honolulu, Hawaii and was raised in Massillon, Ohio. He attended Washington High School, Kent State University, and the Ohio State Highway Patrol Officers Academy. Morelli worked for the Fairlawn Police Department for one year and the Westerville Police Department for 29 years. He was married in 1989 and had a daughter and a son. His grandchild was born after his death.

== Perpetrator ==
At the time of the murders, Quentin Smith (born February 23, 1987) was staying at a townhouse in Westerville, Ohio, where his wife Candace and their daughter lived. The Smiths had been separated for about a year and he was living with his mother in Cleveland but had come back to Westerville for a visit. Smith had married Candace in February 2014 and was abusive to her. Along with domestic violence, his arrest records, and convictions show a criminal history that involved burglary, motor vehicle theft, carrying a concealed weapon, intimation, aggravated menacing, simple assault, and felonious assault. Smith's defense lawyers said he has an IQ of 85 and had experienced mental illness and verbal abuse.

=== Previous arrests and charges ===
In August 2007, in Euclid, Ohio, Smith's mother told police that Smith stabbed her boyfriend. According to Smith's mother, her boyfriend had tried to prevent Smith from taking her car after she kicked him out of the house. Smith's mother told police that Smith pointed a pellet gun at her boyfriend which her boyfriend knocked away. His mother's boyfriend told police this as well. Smith then allegedly pulled a three and a half inch knife and stabbed his mother's boyfriend in his left side and right hand. Smith, who told police that he was defending himself, was charged with two counts of felonious assault, one count of aggravated menacing and one count of theft of a motor vehicle by a Grand Jury, but those charges were dropped after the alleged victim did not appear in court to testify.

In May 2009, Smith plead guilty to committing a burglary with a firearm. Along with the burglary with a gun specification, he also pleaded guilty to one count of domestic violence. He was sentenced to three years in prison for the burglary with credit for 215 jail days. Smith was in prison from June 2009 to October 2011. During that stint, most of which was spent at the Richland Correctional Institution in Mansfield, he had one disciplinary-conduct report after entering another inmates cell and punching him. He sought early release but was denied. In a 2011 letter to the Court requesting early release, Smith wrote that he had successfully completed the “Thinking For a Change” program and was almost done with his barber training. He was issued a barber license in 2016 which expired in 2018. Following Smith's release from prison in 2011, he was placed on parole until November 2013.

During her marriage to Smith, Candace Smith frequently sought help from police regarding his abuse. In September 2017, she called to say that Smith was drunk and doing something to her car as he was moving out. Smith left without incident. On November 29, 2017, Candace Smith visited the Westerville Police Department to inquire about protection orders. She told officers that Smith had come home drunk earlier that week and forced himself on her sexually. She also told police that when she threatened to leave he would tell her he that would kill her, their daughter and himself and that Smith "has a gun that he carries all of the time, and if it isn't on him, it is close by." Candace left the department saying that she wanted to talk to her father first but 30 minutes later she and Smith got into an argument when she accused him of cheating on her and giving her a sexually transmitted infection. She locked Smith out and he responded by calling the police. Smith denied the allegations and refused to leave despite his wife's request. Police recommended that Candace and the baby stay in a different part of the house and that they contact them if the couple got into another argument. On January 20, 2018, Smith's mother called police to his house to report a disturbance but Smith and Candace said they did not need the police.

Though Smith was not allowed to own a firearm due to his criminal history, he paid Gerald Lawson 100 dollars to buy one for him.

== Crime ==
On February 8, 2018, Smith, who had been living in Cleveland with his mother after he and his wife separated, came back to Westerville to visit with his daughter. During the visit, he stayed at Candace's house. On February 10, Smith borrowed Candace's car to go to Walmart. Inside the car he found a book with the name of one of her male co-workers. That male co-worker had gotten a ride from Candace to his father's house to get a car, as his fiancée had cancer and had taken their car to a medical facility. Candace also used her car to take him and some other co-workers to a work-related seminar. Smith, however, believed that his wife was romantically involved with this co-worker and became enraged and started face-timing her from the store.

When Smith got home he physically assaulted Candace by punching her in the face with a closed fist and choking her with both hands until she lost consciousness. She woke up to him slapping her in the face and saying her name. Candace called 9-1-1 but hung up because she was scared that her husband would hear her talking to them. The police dispatchers called back but could only hear Candace's crying. The second call they made went to her voicemail.

Operators dispatched Joering and Morelli along with officer Timothy Ray to the Smiths' home. They responded at 12:10, eight minutes after the initial 9-1-1 call. Officer Ray went to the back of the house while Joering and Morelli went to the front. At 12:12 officers told dispatchers it was “all quiet right now” before knocking.

Before police arrived Smith confronted his wife carrying both his and her guns. He asked her to hold them as they went toward the door where Joering and Morelli were knocking. When she refused to hold them he stuck them in the cushions on the couch. When Smith saw that police were there he said to his wife, “You called the cops on me?” Smith opened the door and Joering and Morelli told the Smiths they were responding to a call about a domestic dispute. Candace moved the door back so they could see her and said: “He just got done beating me up and he has a gun.” She then stepped outside believing the officers would arrest Smith. Instead, Smith reached for the guns he had placed in the couch. The officers told him “Don’t do it, don’t do it” before he started shooting.

After Smith started shooting Candace ran outside. When the shooting stopped Candace went back in the house to get her daughter who was in the living room and found Joering down in doorway and Morelli tussling on the floor with Smith. More shots were fired and she ran back outside and hid in the bushes.

Smith shot Joering at point-blank range, killing him instantly. The autopsy showed that Joering had suffered three gunshot wounds. One shot went through his left arm and out his left shoulder. The other shot went through the inner part of his right wrist and out the outer part of his forearm. The fatal shot went through the left side of his forehead and through his frontal bone. It then traveled through the left cerebral hemisphere of his brain, fractured his skull, and went out the back of his neck. Morelli was shot on the left side of his chest through a gap in his bulletproof vest. The bullet went through his left lung, through the back covering of his heart and into the right lung, with the bullet being recovered from his right chest cavity. The officers managed to shoot Smith five times.

After shots were fired, Officer Ray went around to the front and inside the house where he found Joering, Morelli, and Smith all of whom had been shot. He tried to aid Joering but quickly realized that he was dead as he had no pulse and was shot in the forehead. He moved over to Morelli who was saying that he was hit. He tried to tend to Morelli while telling Smith, who was still trying to move, to stay down and keeping his gun pointed at him.

Candace, who was hiding in some bushes in the front yard, made a 9-1-1 call saying “My husband shot — he shot the police officers. Please hurry up. My daughter is in there.” Minutes later more officers arrived. Officer Stacey Pentecost testified that she found Morelli laying on the floor holding himself up by his elbow and Joering laying behind him on his side. Officer James Mason testified that Morelli was trying to crawl out of the doorway. Officer Mason and Officer Pentecost looked upstairs for more people and found no one. They then came back down and tried to aid Joering. It was after medics arrived that Pentecost noticed the Smiths' daughter on the couch. Medics tried to save Joering but couldn't. He was pronounced dead at the scene. Officer Dan Betts helped Officer Ray secure Smith and then went over to help Morelli and pulled him outside of the house. Morelli was still able to speak at this point and told Betts that he was having trouble breathing. Witnesses reported that after medics arrived Morelli stopped speaking and appeared to lose consciousness. He was taken to The Ohio State University Wexner Medical Center in Columbus in critical condition where he later died. The Smiths' daughter, who was fifteen months old, was later found by officers on the couch silent and unharmed.

== Aftermath and legal proceedings ==
After the murders, Smith was taken to the Ohio State University Wexner Medical Center where he stayed for eight days. Smith was charged with the murders on February 11. He was then transported to the Franklin County Jail where he was held without bail.

An inmate at the County Jail testified that Smith had told him that he had guns and drugs in the house and that he observed an officer behind the house and two more in the front before opening the door. According to the inmate's testimony, because of the guns and drugs he had, Smith pulled out his gun and shot the first officer twice. The other officer then shot him in the abdomen and he shot him in the head. Smith also told the inmate he had gone to the shooting range to practice for such an incident and that he was prepared for it and would “hold court in the street” before going back to jail. A correctional officer also reported that while Smith was in jail an inmate told Smith “you don’t know anything about guns” to which Smith replied “you better check my case. I’m surgical with them.”

Smith was tried in October and November 2019. Jury selection began on October 18 and was finalized on October 28 with the trial beginning later that day with opening arguments. The jury consisted of three men and nine women. The defense argued that Smith did not intend to kill Joering and Morelli, but that he reacted in a moment of panic and confusion. The prosecutors argued that Smith purposely killed the victims, who he knew were police officers, so that he wouldn't go back to jail.

On October 29, police officer Timothy Ray, who went to the Smith's residence with Joering and Morelli, was the first witness called. Other police officers who arrived after shots were fired also testified.

On October 30, Smith's wife and a jail inmate who he had spoken to about the murders testified. Jurors also heard from Deputy William Carmen, a corrections officer in the jail Smith was held at. Carmen said that during a conversation about guns with another inmate in the same area as Smith's cell the inmate told Smith, “You don’t know anything about guns.” Smith then told the inmate “You better check my case. I’m surgical with them.” Also on October 30, a deputy county coroner testified that Joering died of a gunshot wound to the forehead while Morelli died of a gunshot wound that entered through his left chest and went through his left lung, the covering of his heart, and his right lung. Closing arguments were heard on October 31, with jury deliberation beginning the next day. The jury deliberated for three and a half hours before finding Smith guilty of two counts of aggravated murder, two counts of murder and one count of domestic violence, along with two specifications that made him eligible for the death penalty - killing police officers purposely and killing two or more people purposely.

The sentencing phase of the trial began on Monday, November 4, with the first witnesses being Morelli's widow Linda Morelli, Joering's widow Jami Joering, and Morelli's daughter Elizabeth Morelli, who were called by the State of Ohio. The widows gave victim impact statements, telling jurors about the effects of the murders on them and their families, while Morelli's daughter spoke about how she had gotten married shortly after her father's death without him there. It was believed to be the first time in Ohio that victim impact statements were allowed in the sentencing phase of a capital case. The defense called a psycho-social investigator and a psychologist. Closing arguments for the sentencing phase were held on November 6. Later that day, the jury recommended Smith be sentenced to life imprisonment without parole after deliberating for almost four hours and becoming deadlocked. Though prosecutors said they found the decision disappointing in some regards the victims’ widows told them they were pleased with the sentence. The president of the Fraternal Order of Police (FOP) also expressed disappointment in the verdict.

Along with prosecutors and the FOP president, some jurors also expressed disappointment over the sentencing verdict. A male and a female juror told a local TV station that several jurors refused to consider voting for a death sentence. One juror reportedly said immediately that they couldn't recommend a death sentence and would not change their mind. "We all took an oath” said the female juror. “They knew this wasn't going to be easy. Can you sign pen to paper- can you sign to the death penalty? And everybody did- but when we got in that room, one just sat back and said, 'Life - I can't do it. And I'm done. I will not be changed, you cannot change my mind. Life.' You won't even listen to us discuss this? 'Life.'" The male juror reported that another juror said, “I don't know why we even have to be here." When asked how she felt about the life sentence the female juror said she felt disgusted and “I feel like the family did not get justice. Those fathers, those husbands, they're doing their job. Just doing their job." The male juror said “He's alive while these two police officers are dead," and that "I just don't think justice was served.

On November 21, Judge Richard Frye sentenced Smith to two consecutive life sentences without parole, along with 26 and a half years imprisonment. Judge Frye shared statements made by the victims about the impact the crime had on them and told Smith "This jury spared your life- and you owe it to the rest of us to take this to heart. And to be as good a person for the rest of your life as you can possibly be. It will not pay back the families and the community that you cost these wonderful officers but it will be a way for you to show in some small way, some remorse."

Smith currently resides at the Lorain Correctional Institution in Grafton, Ohio serving a life sentence.

== Legacy and response ==
The City of Westerville's Twitter account reported that an officer had been killed on the day of the murders just before 2:00 pm. They then reported that another officer had died an hour later. The local Fraternal Order of Police set up a Go Fund Me account which was verified by the city to help cover medical bills, funeral expenses, and education costs for the victims' children. A funeral for Morelli was held at the Moreland Funeral Home while Joering's funeral was held in the Hill Funeral Home. Vigils were held at The Ohio State University, Otterbein University, and the First Responders Park in Westerville.

President Trump responded to the murders tweeting “This is a true tragedy”, while Governor John Kasich tweeted "The finest among us are those who risk it all every day for our safety, and Officers Anthony Morelli and Eric Joering were those people. Their deaths are a terrible tragedy." Kasich also ordered that flags in public properties be flown at half staff.

In July 2018, Morelli and Joering's police badge insignias, as well as a badge insignia belonging to another fallen police officer, were placed on a training jet used in Columbus State Community College's aviation maintenance program. In November 2018 the Ohio Department of Transportation designated a portion of Interstate 270 as a remembrance to both victims. The ODOT placed signs designating the portion as “Officers Anthony Morelli and Eric Joering Memorial Highway.”

Morelli and Joering have been honored in both an annual memorial ceremony for fallen Ohio police officers as well as in a national ceremony for fallen police officers. The Ohio memorial took place in 2019 in London, Ohio, at the Ohio Peace Officer Training Academy while the national ceremony was in Washington D.C. In that national ceremony, during National Police Week in 2019, the doors belonging to the cruisers the victims drove were displayed. Each door had the officer's names and the dates of their deaths.

In October 2019 the Blue Blood Brotherhood, a non-profit group, donated 28 sets of body armor plates to the Westerville Police Department and the Delaware County Sheriff's tactical unit.
