= Thomia Hunter =

American murderer (born 1976)

Thomia Hunter (born 1976) was convicted in 2005 of killing her ex-boyfriend in 2004, who had been abusing her. She was sentenced to life in prison for stabbing Andrew Harris 22 times. During her trial Hunter testified that Harris began the attack by beating, choking, pouring hot sauce in her eyes and cutting her with a knife. In 2019 then Ohio Governor John Kasich commuted Hunter's sentence, setting her free from prison on July 15, 2019. Her release was contingent on her completion of a reintegration program sponsored by the Ohio Department of Rehabilitation and Correction.

Her clemency was a result of two factors that were recently uncovered and not presented at her trial in 2015: she was possibly suffering from battered woman syndrome that the Ohio Parole Board noticed in 2018 and evidence that Harris had been savagely attacking her the night of his death at 2:30 am in Hunter's apartment. The parole board found that the abusive nature of her relationship with Harris never came up during the trial.

Hunter was from Cleveland, Ohio.
