= Belmont Prisons =

Belmont Prisons is the terminus of the London Buses route 80.

It may refer to:

- HM Prison High Down, for men
- HM Prison Downview, for women

== See also ==
- Belmont Correctional Institution, a prison in St. Clairsville, Ohio, United States
