= Warren Correctional Institution =

Prison in Ohio, United States

Coordinates: 39°26′10″N 84°18′34″W

- Interactive map of Warren Correctional Institution
- Location: 5787 Ohio 63 Lebanon, Ohio
- Status: Open
- Security class: Maximum
- Capacity: 1328
- Opened: 1989
- Managed by: Ohio Department of Rehabilitation and Correction
- Director: Warden Chae Harris

Warren Correctional Institution is a prison operated by the Ohio Department of Rehabilitation and Correction in Warren County's Turtlecreek Township. The postal address states Lebanon, Ohio.

The prison, which opened in 1989, sits on 45 acres (18 ha; 180,000 m^{2}) of land, part of the purchase made by the state after the closure of the Shaker settlement at Union Village in 1912. It is immediately west of another state prison, the Lebanon Correctional Institution. As of 2005, it has a staff of 415 and houses 1,037 inmates, about evenly divided between blacks and whites. Most of the inmates are in "close" security, the middle designation in Ohio's system. The 2005 budget is $28,249,395 and the annual cost per inmate is $25,378.

== Notable inmates ==
- T.J. Lane - Perpetrator of the 2012 Chardon High School shooting.
- Quentin Smith (since 2019) - Murdered police officers Eric Joering and Anthony Morelli.

== See also ==
- Lebanon Correctional Institution on the same property.
