= Hocking Correctional Facility =

State prison in Ohio, United States

Coordinates: 39°28′13″N 82°13′33″W

- Interactive map of Hocking Correctional Facility
- Location: 16759 Snake Hollow Road Nelsonville, Ohio
- Status: closed
- Security class: specialized (geriatric)
- Capacity: 481
- Opened: 1982
- Closed: March 2018
- Managed by: Ohio Department of Rehabilitation and Correction

Hocking Correctional Facility was an Ohio state prison located in Ward Township, Hocking County, just north of Nelsonville, Ohio. The facility was originally built in 1952 as a sanatorium and later a children's center. It was converted into prison in 1982. The prison employed a staff of 110. This prison was used primarily to incarcerate the state's aging prison population. The prison's operating budget for 2007 was $13,867,468; and the daily cost per inmate was $80.94. The prison, as of April 2007, housed 481 inmates. Of those: 111 were African American, 363 were Caucasian, and 7 were Latino. In 2018, the prison housed 430 inmates.

The Ohio Department of Rehabilitation and Correction announced in January 2018 that the correctional facility would close in March to trim operating costs.

The facility was to reopen in 2019 as a women's rehabilitation center but has yet to be remodeled and reopened.

== Notable Inmates ==
- Salt Walther, Former USAC and CART Series Driver. Best remembered for an accident at the start of the 1973 Indianapolis 500 that left him critically injured.
