= Noble Correctional Institution =

Prison in Ohio, United States

Coordinates: 39°44′32″N 81°33′03″W

- Interactive map of Noble Correctional Institution
- Location: 15708 Mcconnellsville Road Caldwell, Ohio
- Status: mixed; most medium and minimum
- Capacity: 2482
- Opened: 1996
- Managed by: Ohio Department of Rehabilitation and Correction

The Noble Correctional Institution is a medium-security prison for men located in Caldwell, Noble County, Ohio and operated by the Ohio Department of Rehabilitation and Correction. The facility first opened in 1996 and has a population of 2482 state inmates.
