= Northeast Ohio Correctional Center =

Private medium-security prison for men

Coordinates: 41°07′53″N 80°37′55″W

- Interactive map of Northeast Ohio Correctional Center
- Location: 2240 Hubbard Road, Youngstown, Ohio, U.S.
- Status: operational
- Security class: medium security
- Capacity: 2,016 (as of 2017)
- Opened: 1997
- Managed by: CoreCivic

Northeast Ohio Correctional Center is a private medium-security prison for men in Youngstown, Ohio, United States. It opened in 1997 and is operated by CoreCivic, under contract with the United States Marshals Service and the Ohio Department of Rehabilitation and Correction. As of 2017, the facility has capacity for approximately 2,016 inmates as well as 550 detainees from the Marshals Service and 200 detainees from Immigration and Customs Enforcement.

== History ==
The facility has been owned and operated by CoreCivic and its predecessor, Corrections Corporation of America, since 1997. It opened in May 1997 with a short-term contract with the District of Columbia Department of Corrections to house 900 inmates from their notorious Lorton Correctional Complex.

The combination of an inexperienced, unprepared staff with "young, aggressive, and violent" residents meant immediate friction. There was a serious disruption by May 30. Through 1997 a pattern of disruptions, assaults, and challenges to authority did not deter the District from expanding the contract to 1700 prisoners by October. On February 22, 1998, inmate Derrick Davis was stabbed to death in his cell. United States District Judge Sam H. Bell halted any further transfers of prisoners from the District of Columbia. On March 11, "in a devastating convergence of security lapses," inmate Bryson Chisley was stabbed by a fellow inmate in a high security segregation unit. Chisley's wife had been urging officials to keep them separated and had even gone to the local press. Chisley's killer had "the assistance of the individual who was the principal assailant of Davis three weeks earlier."

In May a surprise inspection by members of the Ohio state Correctional Institution Inspection Committee were turned away at the gate. On July 25, 1998, six violent criminals escaped through a perimeter fence. All were eventually caught.

A federal report on the continuing crisis was released to the Attorney General on November 25, 1998. The overview of its major findings began with:

The Northeast Ohio Correctional Center has experienced pivotal failures in its security and operational management as a result of seriously flawed decisions by leaders of both CCA and DOC. Expediency and the pressure of short-term objectives often prevailed over good judgement and sound correctional management procedures. Identification and resolution of problems were too often delayed by the failure to perform self-assessment and management oversight. It is reasonable to conclude that certain of the most serious problems which endangered the safety of the public, the staff or the inmates were preventable or subject to mitigation.

The Federal Bureau of Prisons ended its contract in 2014 and removed all its prisoners the following year.
