= Donald Harvey =

American serial killer (1952–2017)

- Mug shot
- Born: April 15, 1952; Hamilton, Ohio, U.S.
- Died: March 30, 2017 (aged 64); Toledo, Ohio, U.S.
- Cause of death: Blunt trauma
- Other name: "Angel of Death"
- Convictions: Ohio; Aggravated murder (28 counts); Attempted aggravated murder (7 counts); Felonious assault Kentucky; Murder (8 counts); Manslaughter
- Penalty: 28 consecutive life sentences without parole plus $270,000 in fines

Details
- Victims: 37 confirmed 87 alleged and suspected
- Span of crimes: 1970–1987
- Country: United States
- States: Ohio, Kentucky
- Date apprehended: April 6, 1987
- Imprisoned at: Toledo Correctional Institution, 1987

Donald Harvey (April 15, 1952 – March 30, 2017) was an American serial killer who claimed to have murdered 87 people, though he has 37 confirmed victims. He was able to do this during his time as a hospital orderly. His spree took place between 1970 and 1987.

Harvey claimed to have begun killing to "ease the pain" of patients—mostly cardiac patients—by smothering them with their pillows. However, he gradually grew to enjoy killing and became a self-described "angel of death". At the time of his death, Harvey was serving 28 life sentences at the Toledo Correctional Institution in Toledo, Ohio, having pleaded guilty to murder charges to avoid execution.

== Early life ==
Donald Harvey was born in Hamilton, Ohio on April 15, 1952, the oldest of three children born to Ray and Goldie Harvey. He was raised in the tiny Appalachian town of Booneville, Kentucky, where his parents were struggling tobacco farmers and members of the local Baptist church.

From the ages of five to eighteen, Harvey was sexually molested by both an uncle and a neighbor, but he told no one except his sister, and only after the abuse ended. Harvey dropped out of school in the ninth grade, but he earned a correspondence school GED in 1968. After an arrest for burglary in March 1971, Harvey enlisted in the United States Air Force, but was discharged after nine months due to two suicide attempts; after these nervous breakdowns, he came to terms with his homosexuality.

== Murders ==
Harvey began working in hospitals at the age of 18 as an orderly at the Marymount Hospital in London, Kentucky. At Marymount, Harvey committed his first murders. His first victim was 88-year-old Logan Evans, an incontinent stroke victim, whom Harvey smothered with a pillow in May 1970, after the patient smeared feces on him. He later confessed that during the ten-month period he worked at the hospital, he killed at least a dozen patients. Harvey was insistent that he killed purely out of a sense of empathy for the suffering of those who were terminally ill but admitted that many of the killings were committed due to anger at the victims. His victims ranged from middle age to elderly and were unusually broad in range, including men and women of various races, ethnicities and backgrounds. The only thing they had in common was that they were all cardiac patients.

The full extent of Harvey's crimes may never be known since so many were undetected for so long. He did not use any particular modus operandi and used many methods to kill his victims, such as: arsenic, cyanide, insulin, suffocation, miscellaneous poisons, morphine, turning off ventilators, administration of fluid tainted with hepatitis B and/or HIV (which resulted in a hepatitis infection, but no HIV infection, and illness rather than death), and insertion of a coat hanger into a catheter, causing an abdominal puncture and subsequent peritonitis. Cyanide and arsenic were his most-used methods, with Harvey administering them via food or injections. The majority of Harvey's crimes took place at Marymount Hospital, the Cincinnati V.A. Medical Hospital, and Cincinnati's Drake Memorial Hospital. At various times, he worked as an orderly or an autopsy assistant.

Harvey did not limit his victims to helpless hospital patients. When he suspected his lover and roommate Carl Hoeweler of infidelity, he poisoned Hoeweler's food with arsenic so he would be too ill to leave their apartment. He poisoned two of his neighbors—sickening one, Diane Alexander, by putting hepatitis serum in her drink, and killing the other, Helen Metzger, by putting arsenic in her pie. He also killed Hoeweler's father Henry with arsenic.

== Investigation ==
After keeping his crimes hidden for seventeen years, Harvey slipped up in March 1987. An autopsy on John Powell, who had died abruptly after spending several months on life support following a motorcycle accident, revealed large amounts of cyanide in his system. Harvey became a person of interest when investigators learned he had been forced to resign from the Cincinnati VA hospital after he was caught stealing body parts for occult rituals. At the time, most hospitals did not vet orderlies as closely as doctors or nurses. When they brought Harvey in for questioning, he confessed to Powell's murder, claiming he had euthanized him with cyanide.

Pat Minarcin, then an anchor at Cincinnati station WCPO-TV, found it unlikely that someone who had spent almost two decades caring for patients could suddenly kill one without having killed before. During his report on the night of Harvey's arrest, Minarcin asked on-air if there had been any other deaths. It was soon revealed that several nurses at Drake had raised concerns with administrators upon noticing a spike in deaths while Harvey was employed there, but they had been ordered to keep quiet. Not wanting to chance that he would be acquitted, the nurses contacted Minarcin and told him that there was evidence Harvey killed at least ten more people. Over the next several months, Minarcin investigated the suspicious deaths and amassed enough evidence to air a half-hour special report detailing evidence that linked Harvey to at least 24 murders in a four-year period. Harvey had been able to stay under the radar in part because he worked in an area of Drake where patients were not expected to survive.

When Harvey's court-appointed lawyer, Bill Whalen, was briefed in advance about Minarcin's findings, he immediately asked Harvey if he had killed anyone else. Harvey replied that by his "estimate", he had killed as many as 70 people. Whalen knew that if prosecutors could link Harvey to more than one murder, Ohio law allowed them to seek a death sentence. In a bid to save his client's life, Whalen offered prosecutors a plea bargain—if the death penalty were taken off the table, Harvey would accept a de facto sentence of life without parole and confess to all of his murders. The prosecutors agreed. In a marathon session with prosecutors, Harvey admitted to killing 24 people.

In August 1987, Harvey pleaded guilty to 24 counts of first-degree murder. In accordance with the plea agreement, he was sentenced to three concurrent terms of life in prison. The plea agreement allowed prosecutors to seek a death sentence if more murders came to light. With this in mind, that November, Harvey pleaded guilty in Laurel County, Kentucky Circuit Court to eight counts of murder and one count of manslaughter for killing nine patients at Marymount Hospital in London, Kentucky in the 1970s. He was sentenced to life plus 20 years, to run concurrently with the Ohio sentence. Ultimately, Harvey pleaded guilty to 37 murders. However, he confessed to killing as many as 50 people.

Harvey was admitted to the Ohio prison system on October 26, 1987.

== Death ==
On March 28, 2017, Harvey was found in his cell severely beaten. He died two days later, on March 30, 2017. On May 3, 2019, fellow inmate James Elliott was charged with aggravated murder and other charges related to Harvey's death. In September 2019, he was sentenced to 25 years to life in prison after pleading guilty to killing Harvey. The sentence was originally ordered to run consecutively to his other sentences, but was later changed to run concurrently, making Elliott eligible for parole in 2046 at age 71. Prior to the murder of Harvey, Elliott had been convicted of burglary, attempted burglary and aggravated burglary, totaling up to 62 counts. He was also convicted of attempted possession of a deadly weapon under detention and two counts of felonious assault while in prison.

Elliott claimed that he murdered Harvey to protest prison conditions and in an act of vigilante justice. Elliott said he grew up near Harvey's victims in Kentucky and claimed that he had wanted to give their families closure. Elliott did not personally know any of Harvey's victims. However, his mother claimed that he had become angry when Harvey reportedly bragged about having murdered elderly people. Judge Myron Duhart told Elliott, "No matter how bad a person is, that does not give you the right to be the judge, jury, and executioner." Prosecutors claimed that Elliott had targeted Harvey out of jealousy since he was receiving different meals at the prison because of his religion.

== Known victims ==
Victim	Name	Age	Gender	State	Date of murder	Type of murder	Method
1	Logan Evans	88	M	Kentucky	May 31, 1970	Intentional, non-premeditated	Suffocation; smothered with a pillow and plastic bag
2	James Tyree	69	M	Kentucky	May 31, 1970	Accidental	Harvey gave Tyree the wrong catheter, causing him to vomit blood and die
3	Elizabeth Wyatt	42	F	Kentucky	June 22, 1970	Intentional, non-premeditated	Suffocation; cut off her oxygen supply
4	Eugene McQueen	43	M	Kentucky	July 10, 1970	Intentional, non-premeditated	Drowning; turned over on his back, causing him to drown in his own fluids
5	Harvey Williams	82	M	Kentucky	July 12, 1970	Accidental	Cardiac arrest; was given a faulty oxygen tank
6	Ben Gilbert	81	M	Kentucky	July 24–28, 1970	Intentional, premeditated	Organ infection; had knocked Harvey out with a urinal; Harvey gave him a catheter that was too large and then put a straightened coat hanger through it and into Gilbert's urethra, puncturing his bladder and bowel; went into instant shock and a coma, where he died four days later
7	Maude Nichols	64	F	Kentucky	August 15, 1970	Intentional, non-premeditated	Cardiac arrest; was given a faulty oxygen tank
8	William Bowling	58	M	Kentucky	August 30, 1970	Intentional, non-premeditated	Heart attack; cut off his oxygen supply
9	Viola Reed Wyran	63	F	Kentucky	November 4, 1970	Intentional, premeditated	Suffocation, attempted to kill her by smothering her with a pillow and plastic bag but was interrupted; later killed her by giving her a faulty oxygen tank
10	Margaret Harrison	91	F	Kentucky	December 6, 1970	Intentional, non-premeditated	Drug overdose; overdosed her on demerol, codeine, and morphine
11	Sam Carroll	80	M	Kentucky	January 6, 1971	Intentional, premeditated	Suffocation; given a faulty oxygen tank
12	Maggie Rawlins	84	F	Kentucky	January 15, 1971	Intentional, premeditated	Suffocation; smothered with a pillow and a plastic bag between it and her face
13	Silas Butner	62	M	Kentucky	January 23, 1971	Intentional, non-premeditated	Suffocation; given a faulty oxygen tank
14	John V. Combs	68	M	Kentucky	January 26, 1971	Intentional, premeditated	Suffocation; attempted to smother him with a plastic bag, but instead gave him a faulty oxygen tank
15	Milton Bryant Sasser	91	M	Kentucky	March 14, 1971	Intentional, premeditated	Drug overdose; overdosed him on morphine
16	Helen Metzger	63	F	Ohio	April 10, 1983	Intentional, premeditated	Internal injuries; after an argument with Harvey, Metzger was given arsenic after a tracheotomy, causing paralysis and hemorrhaging
17	Henry Hoeweler	82	M	Ohio	May 1, 1983	Intentional, premeditated	Stroke and kidney failure; poisoned with arsenic
18	Howard Vetter	58	M	Ohio	December 31, 1984	Accidental	Heart attack; drank alcohol Harvey had poisoned
19	Hiram Profitt	65	M	Ohio	September 19, 1984	Accidental	Drug overdose; overdosed him on heparin
20	James Peluso	65	M	Ohio	November 9, 1984	Intentional, premeditated	Cardiac arrest; poisoned with arsenic, was one of Harvey's ex-lovers
21	Edward Wilson	32	M	Ohio	March 18–25, 1985	Intentional, non-premeditated	Poisoning; poisoned with arsenic, died 5 days after poisoning
22	Nathanial J. Watson	65	M	Ohio	April 8, 1986	Intentional, premeditated	Suffocation; smothered with a wet plastic garbage bag liner; unsuccessfully attempted several times prior
23	Leon Nelson	64	M	Ohio	April 14, 1986	Intentional, non-premeditated	Suffocation; smothered with a wet plastic garbage bag liner
24	Virgil Weddle	81	M	Ohio	April 19, 1986	Intentional, premeditated	Heart attack; poisoned with rat poison in his pudding
25	Lawrence Berndsen	N/A	M	Ohio	April 20–23, 1986	Intentional, premeditated	Poisoning; poisoned repeatedly with rat poison; died three days later
26	Doris Nally	65	F	Ohio	May 2, 1986	Intentional, premeditated	Poisoning; poisoned with cyanide in her apple juice
27	Willie Johnson	N/A	M	Ohio	May–June 1986, survived	Intentional, premeditated	Poisoning; attempted to poison with arsenic repeatedly
28	Edward Schreibesis	63	M	Ohio	June 20, 1986	Intentional, premeditated	Poisoning; poisoned with arsenic in his soup
29	Robert Crockett	80	M	Ohio	June 29, 1986	Intentional, premeditated	Poisoning; poisoned with cyanide in his I.V.
30	Donald Barney	91	M	Ohio	July 7, 1986	Intentional, premeditated	Poisoning; fed cyanide through a feeding tube and injected it into his buttocks
31	James T. Woods	65	M	Ohio	July 25, 1986	Intentional, premeditated	Poisoning; poisoned with cyanide through his gastric tube
32	Ernst C. Frey	85	M	Ohio	August 16, 1986	Intentional, premeditated	Poisoning; poisoned with arsenic through his gastric tube
33	Milton Canter	85	M	Ohio	August 29, 1986	Intentional, premeditated	Poisoning; poisoned with cyanide through his nasal tube
34	Roger Evans	74	M	Ohio	September 17, 1986	Intentional, premeditated	Poisoning; poisoned with cyanide through his gastric tube
35	Clayborn Kendrick	69	M	Ohio	September 20, 1986	Intentional, premeditated	Poisoning; poisoned with cyanide through both his gastric tube and an injection into his testes
36	Albert Buehimann	69	M	Ohio	October 27, 1986	Intentional, premeditated	Poisoning; poisoned with cyanide dissolved in his cup of water
37	William Collins	85	M	Ohio	October 30, 1986	Intentional, premeditated	Poisoning; poisoned with cyanide dissolved in his orange juice
38	Henry Cody	78	M	Ohio	November 4, 1986	Intentional, premeditated	Poisoning; poisoned with cyanide dissolved in water through his gastric tube
39	Mose Thompson	65	M	Ohio	November 22, 1986	Intentional, premeditated	Poisoning; poisoned with cyanide through his nasal tube
40	Odas Day	72	M	Ohio	December 9, 1986	Intentional, premeditated	Poisoning; poisoned with a cyanide solution
41	Cleo Fish	67	F	Ohio	December 10, 1986	Intentional, non-premeditated	Poisoning; poisoned with cyanide in her cranberry juice; removed a lock of her hair post-mortem and burned it
42	Leo Parker	47	M	Ohio	January 1, 1987	Intentional, premeditated	Poisoning; poisoned with cyanide in his feed bag
43	Margaret Kuckro	80	F	Ohio	February 5, 1987	Intentional, premeditated	Poisoning; poisoned with cyanide in her orange juice
44	Stella Lemon	76	F	Ohio	February–March 16, 1987	Intentional, premeditated	Poisoning; poisoned with a cyanide solution
45	Joseph M. Pike	68	M	Ohio	March 6, 1987	Intentional, premeditated	Poisoning; poisoned with detachol
46	Hilda Leitz	82	F	Ohio	March 7, 1987	Intentional, premeditated	Poisoning; poisoned with detachol in her G-tube and her orange juice
47	John W. Powell	44	M	Ohio	March 7, 1987	Intentional, premeditated	Poisoning; poisoned with cyanide in his gastric feeding tube

== Media ==
- WCPO-TV's I-Team, created in 1988, investigated Harvey's crimes. They received several awards for their efforts.
- Autopsy covered Harvey's crimes in the 1995 episode "The Angel of Death".
- Infamous Murders covered Harvey's case alongside two others in its first episode "Angels of Death", first aired in 2001.
- Dr. G: Medical Examiner covered the case in the 2009 episode "Killers Among Us".
- My Favorite Murder featured Harvey's case in its 110th episode, released in 2018.
- Harvey was mentioned along with Elizabeth Wettlaufer in the Season 14 episode of Criminal Minds entitled "Broken Wing", first aired in 2018.
- The podcast And That's Why We Drink covers the case in its the 159th episode "A Sinister Vibe Check and the Governor of Noodletown", released in 2020.

== See also ==
- Serial killers with health-related professions
- List of serial killers in the United States
