= Vehicle registration plates of Ohio =

Ohio vehicle license plates

Ohio
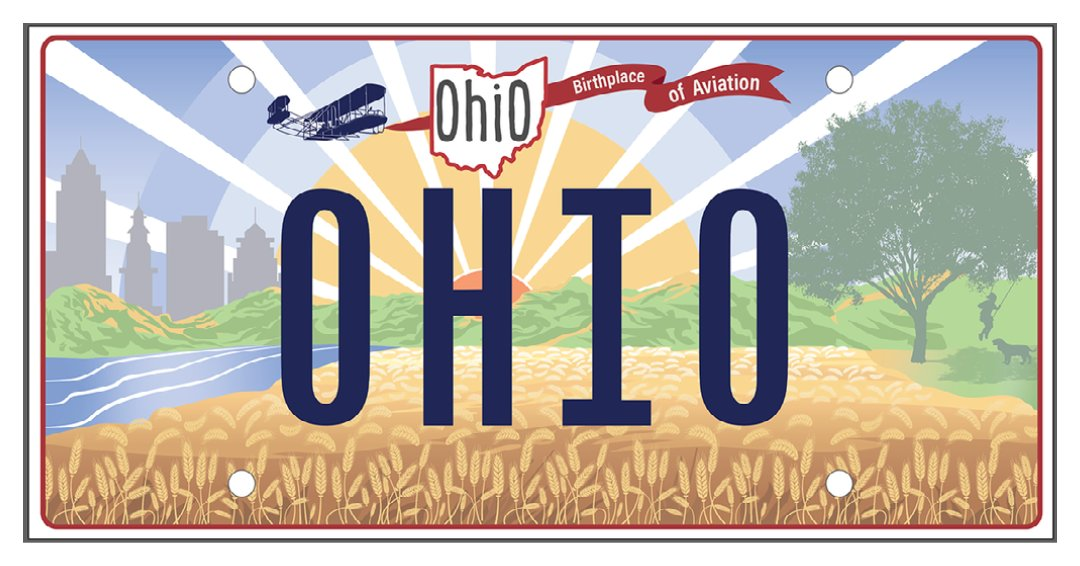

Current series
- Name: Sunrise in Ohio
- Slogan: Birthplace of Aviation
- Size: 12 in × 6 in 30 cm × 15 cm
- Material: Aluminum
- Serial format: ABC 1234
- Introduced: December 29, 2021

Availability
- Issued by: Ohio Department of Public Safety, Bureau of Motor Vehicles
- Manufactured by: Ohio Penal Industries

History
- First issued: July 11, 1908

The U.S. state of Ohio first required its residents to register their motor vehicles and display license plates in 1908, although several cities within the state issued their own license plates from as early as 1902.

As of 2026, plates are issued by the Ohio Bureau of Motor Vehicles (BMV), a division of the Ohio Department of Public Safety. Only rear plates have been required for all classes of vehicles, except commercial tractors, since July 1, 2020. However, vehicle owners can request specialized, personalized plate serials, in addition to their rear plates, for an extra charge. But eventually, that second-plate option will phase out entirely when state legislation passes a bill. All plates are manufactured by inmates at Ohio Penal Industries at the Lebanon Correctional Institution; since 2015, they have been manufactured out of aluminum, having been made of galvanized steel beforehand. The BMV issues a new license plate design about every five years, or with each new administration in the state government.

A new "Sunrise in Ohio" plate design was unveiled by Governor Mike DeWine on October 21, 2021, and was made available to drivers December 29, 2021, replacing the "Ohio Pride" design which had been issued since April 2013.

== History ==
On May 19, 1902, Cleveland became one of the first cities in the country to require motorists to display government-issued registration numbers on their vehicles. In the following years, various local governments in Ohio issued standard metal plates of varying design or numerals (to be mounted on a dark background), including:

- Canton (1905)
- Cleveland (1907–08)
- Cincinnati (initials only 1903–05; 1906–08; motorcycles in 1911, 1913), abbreviated "Cinti"
- Columbus (1907–08), abbreviated "Col's"
- Dayton (1905, 1907, 1908; motorcycles in 1909, 1912, 1913)
- Delhi Township, Hamilton County (1906–08), abbreviated "Delhi"
- East Liverpool (Health Department vehicles in 1924)
- Elyria (motorcycles in 1910)
- Hamilton (1907), abbreviated "Haml"
- Lima (motorcycles in 1908, 1912–13)
- Lorain (1907)
- Mansfield (1903)
- Massillon (1906), abbreviated "M"
- Newark (motorcycles in 1912–13)
- Sandusky (1903)
- Springfield (unknown; motorcycles in 1913), abbreviated "Spfd" on motorcycles
- Toledo (1904, 1907)
- Warren (1908)

In 1906, the state attempted to take over auto registration under the Ward Automobile Law, but litigation delayed the program until the Ohio Supreme Court ruled in favor of the law. The Ohio Secretary of State's Automobile Division, precursor to the Bureau of Motor Vehicles, was established in 1907. The Ward Law went into effect on June 11, 1908, but the Automobile Division did not begin issuing plates for another 30 days due to a manufacturing defect. The first state vehicle registration was issued to Cincinnati resident Thomas B. Paxton, Jr., for his Franklin automobile. Locally issued and owner-provided license plates were phased out by 1909 for automobiles, but local plates continued to be used for motorcycles until 1914. One effect of the Ward Law was to eliminate a significant revenue stream for cities like Cincinnati, which took in about $5,000 a year (equivalent to $179,000 today) from auto registrations.

The Ward Law required automobile owners to display plates at both the front and the rear of the vehicle. Front and rear plates would be issued for passenger vehicles for over a century, through June 30, 2020, with the exception of 1944–46 when only rear plates were issued due to metal conservation for World War II. Ohio issued single-year plates from 1910 through 1973, except in 1943 and 1952 when windshield stickers were issued to revalidate the previous year's plates, again due to metal conservation (for World War II and the Korean War respectively).

Various Ohio license plate designs from 1908 to 1921 used distinctive monograms instead of a fully spelled-out state name. The 1938 plate commemorated the 150th anniversary of the creation of the Northwest Territory (from which the state of Ohio was formed), and thus was the first plate in the state to feature a graphic and a slogan. In 1953, the Bureau of Motor Vehicles commemorated the state's sesquicentennial by issuing a special front plate bearing the state shape and the word "sesqui-centennial" [sic] instead of the passenger serial, which was carried only on the rear plate.

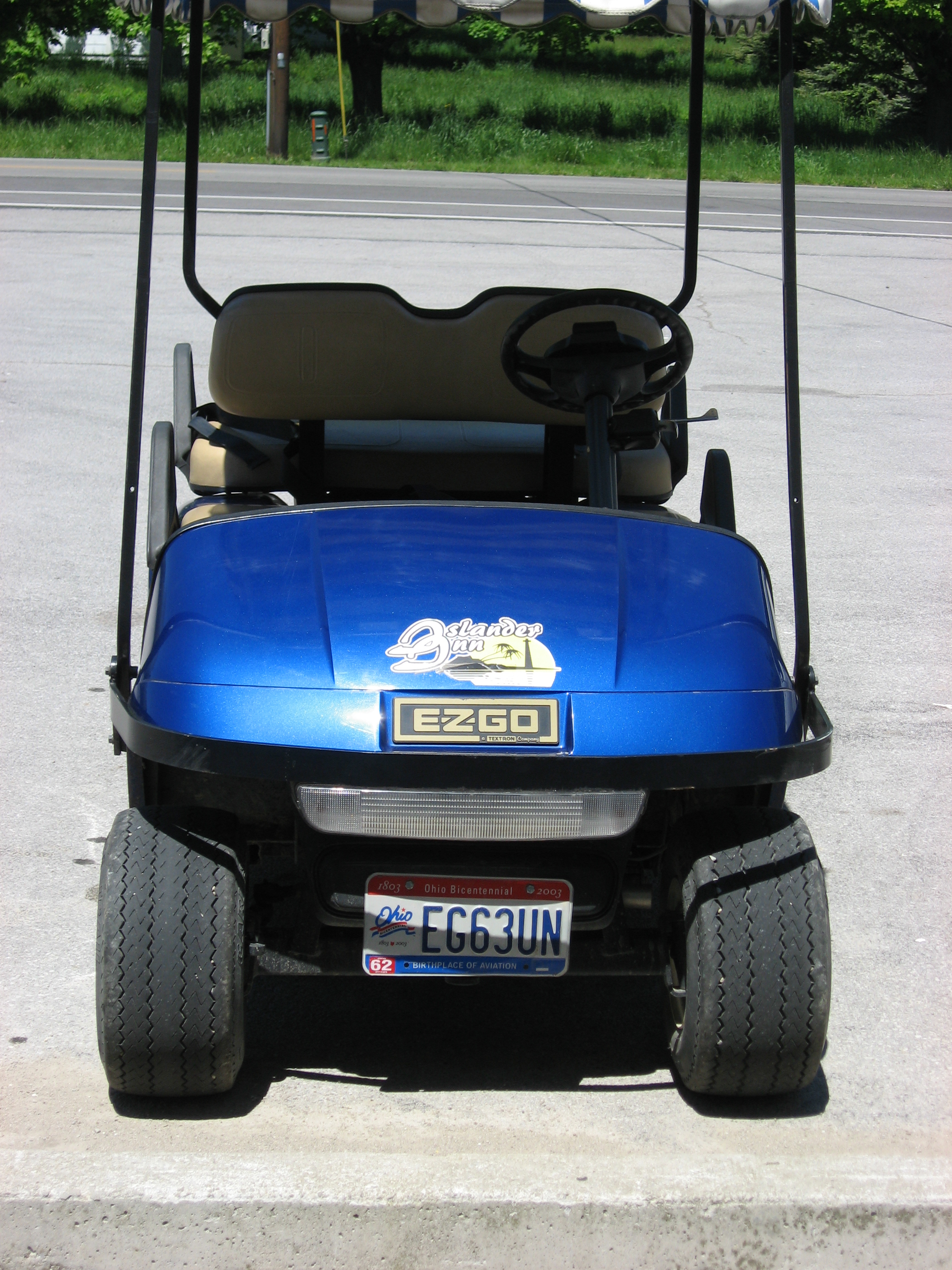
A golf cart in Put-in-Bay displaying an Ohio Bicentennial passenger plate.

From 1935 through 1979, serials were allocated in blocks to each of the state's 88 counties. Serials were originally up to five characters in length and featured one or two letters. Increased demand resulted in the introduction of six-character serials in 1949, followed by all-numeric serials in 1962. The scheme was finally abandoned in 1980.

In 1956, the United States, Canada, and Mexico came to an agreement with the American Association of Motor Vehicle Administrators, the Automobile Manufacturers Association and the National Safety Council that standardized the size for license plates for vehicles (except those for motorcycles) at 6 inches (15 cm) in height by 12 inches (30 cm) in width, with standardized mounting holes. The 1956 (dated 1957) issue was the first Ohio license plate that fully complied with these standards: the state had been issuing plates 6 inches in height by 12 inches in width since 1926, and all plates of the 1952 (dated 1953) and 1955 (dated 1956) issues were to these dimensions, but none had had standard mounting holes.

In 1967, the state began issuing special plates to DUI offenders with limited driving privileges. Judges in Ohio, however, rarely issued them until a 2004 state law made it mandatory for all DUI offenders with limited driving privileges to have them.

After the last single-year plate was issued in 1973, the 1974 plate was revalidated for 1975 with a sticker placed at the bottom right corner. The first undated, multi-year plate was issued in 1976, while monthly staggered registration was introduced in 1979.

Since 1983, plates have carried the county of issuance on a sticker. Originally, this was a long sticker centered at the bottom of the plate, displaying the county name. In 1992, the state introduced a numerical county-coding scheme (see the County Coding section below), with the county number being displayed on a red sticker at the bottom left corner of the plate; this scheme was initially used only on specialty plates before being adopted on standard passenger plates when the Bicentennial base was introduced in October 2001. The scheme was discontinued on standard passenger plates in 2018 in favor of a return to county-name stickers, again centered at the bottom of the plate. The county number sticker can still be requested for standard passenger plates at a BMV office in place of a county-name sticker.

On April 3, 2019, Governor Mike DeWine signed a two-year state transportation budget bill that included the elimination of the requirement for front license plates to be displayed. This became effective on July 1, 2020.

== Passenger baseplates ==
=== 1908 to 1973 ===
Image	Dates issued	Design	Slogan	Serial format	Serials issued	Notes
	1908–09	White serial on dark blue porcelain plate; "OH" monogram at right	none	12345	1 to approximately 23500	
	1910	White serial on woodgrain-colored porcelain plate; vertical "OHIO" and "1910" at left and right respectively	none	12345	1 to approximately 33000	
	1911	Black serial on white porcelain plate; vertical "OHIO" and "1911" at left and right respectively	none	12345	1 to approximately 46000	
12345	1912	Forest green serial on white flat metal plate; vertical "OHIO" and "1912" at left and right respectively	none	12345	1 to approximately 63000	
12345	1913	Maroon serial on white flat metal plate; vertical "OHIO" and "1913" at left and right respectively	none	12345	1 to approximately 86000	
	1914	Red serial on white flat metal plate; "OHIO" monogram and "1914" at left	none	123456	1 to approximately 121000	
	1915	Black serial on white flat metal plate; "OHIO" monogram and "1915" at left	none	123456	1 to approximately 181000	
123456	1916	White serial on black flat metal plate; "OHIO 1916" at left	none	123456	1 to approximately 245000	
	1917	Black serial on yellow flat metal plate; vertical "OHIO" and "1917" at left and right respectively	none	123456	1 to approximately 342000	
123456	1918	Embossed white serial on dark green plate; "OHIO" monogram and "1918" at right	none	123456	1 to approximately 412000	First embossed plate.
	1919	Embossed white serial on maroon plate; "OHIO" monogram and "1919" at left	none	123456	1 to approximately 509000	
123456	1920	Embossed white serial on dark blue plate; "OHIO" monogram at left and "19" over "20" at right	none	123456	1 to approximately 527000	
	1921	Embossed white serial on forest green plate; "OHIO" monogram at left and "19" over "21" at right	none	123456	1 to approximately 618000	
	1922	Embossed dark blue serial on white plate; "OHIO-1922" centered at bottom	none	123.456	1 to approximately 714.000	
	1923	Embossed red serial on gray plate; "OHIO-1923" centered at bottom	none	123.456	1 to approximately 927.000	
	1924	Embossed white serial on dark blue plate; "OHIO-1924" centered at bottom	none	123-456	1 to 999-999	
	1924	Embossed white serial on dark blue plate; "OHIO-1924" centered at bottom	none	★12-345	★1 to approximately ★59-000	
	1925	Embossed black serial on cream plate; "OHIO-1925" centered at bottom	none	123-456 ★12-345		
	1926	Embossed white serial on brown plate; "OHIO-1926" centered at bottom	none	123-456 ★12-345; A12-345		
	1927	Embossed black serial on gray plate; "OHIO-1927" centered at bottom	none	123-456 ★12-345; A12-345		
	1928	Embossed white serial on dark blue plate; "OHIO-1928" centered at bottom	none	123-456 ★12-345; A12-345		
	1929	Embossed black serial on light green plate; "OHIO-1929" centered at bottom	none	123-456; A12-345		
	1930	Embossed white serial on maroon plate; "OHIO-1930" centered at bottom	none	123-456; A12-345		
No image	1931	Embossed black serial on gray plate; "OHIO-1931" centered at bottom	none	123-456; A12-345		
No image	1932	Embossed white serial on dark blue plate; "OHIO-1932" centered at bottom	none	123-456; A12-345		
	1933	Embossed black serial on orange plate; "OHIO-1933" centered at top	none	123-456; A12-345		
	1934	Embossed white serial on maroon plate; "OHIO-1934" centered at bottom	none	123-456; A12-345		
	1935	Embossed yellow serial on dark blue plate with border line; "OHIO - 1935" centered at bottom	none	A·1234; AB·123; 1234·A; 123·AB; A·123·B	Issued in blocks by county	
	1936	Embossed blue serial on white plate with border line; "OHIO - 1936" centered at bottom	none	A·1234; AB·123; 1234·A; 123·AB; A·123·B	Issued in blocks by county	
	1937	Embossed maroon serial on white plate with border line; "OHIO - 1937" centered at bottom	none	A·1234; AB·123; 1234·A; 123·AB; A·123·B	Issued in blocks by county	
	1938	Embossed black serial on white plate with border line; embossed covered wagon graphic centered at bottom; "OHIO·38" at bottom right	"150 ANNIV· N·W·TERR·" at bottom left	A·1234; AB·123; 1234·A; 123·AB; A·123·B	Issued in blocks by county	Commemorated the 150th anniversary of the creation of the Northwest Territory, from which the state of Ohio was formed.
	1939	Embossed blue serial on white plate with border line; "OHIO - 1939" centered at bottom	none	A·1234; AB·123; 1234·A; 123·AB; A·123·B	Issued in blocks by county	
	1940	Embossed white serial on dark blue plate with border line; "OHIO - 1940" centered at bottom	none	A·1234; AB·123; 1234·A; 123·AB; A·123·B	Issued in blocks by county	
	1941	Embossed white serial on maroon plate with border line; "OHIO - 1941" centered at bottom	none	A·1234; AB·123; 1234·A; 123·AB; A·123·B	Issued in blocks by county	
	1942–43	Embossed dark green serial on white plate with border line; "OHIO - 1942" centered at bottom	none	A·1234; AB·123; 1234·A; 123·AB; A·123·B	Issued in blocks by county	Revalidated for 1943 with windshield stickers, due to metal conservation for World War II.
	1944	Embossed white serial on dark blue plate with border line; "OHIO - 1944" centered at bottom	none	A·1234; AB·123; 1234·A; 123·AB; A·123·B	Issued in blocks by county	
	1945	Embossed black serial on white plate with border line; "OHIO - 1945" centered at bottom	none	A·1234; AB·123; 1234·A; 123·AB; A·123·B	Issued in blocks by county	
	1946	Embossed red serial on white plate with border line; "OHIO - 1946" centered at bottom	none	A·1234; AB·123; 1234·A; 123·AB; A·123·B	Issued in blocks by county	
	1947	Embossed white serial on dark green plate with border line; "1947 - OHIO" centered at bottom	none	A·1234; AB·123; 1234·A; 123·AB; A·123·B	Issued in blocks by county	
	1948	Embossed black serial on light yellow plate with border line; "OHIO - 1948" centered at bottom	none	A·1234; AB·123; 1234·A; 123·AB; A·123·B	Issued in blocks by county	
	1949	Embossed light yellow serial on waffle-textured black plate with border line; "1949 - OHIO" centered at bottom	none	A·12345; AB·1234; 12345·A; 1234·AB; A·1234·B	Issued in blocks by county	
	1950	Embossed black serial on waffle-textured yellow plate with border line; "OHIO - 1950" centered at bottom	none	A·12345; AB·1234; 12345·A; 1234·AB; A·1234·B	Issued in blocks by county	
	1951–52	Embossed white serial on dark blue plate with border line; "1951 - OHIO" centered at bottom	none	A·12345; AB·1234; 12345·A; 1234·AB; A·1234·B	Issued in blocks by county	Revalidated for 1952 with windshield stickers, due to metal conservation for the Korean War.
	1953	Embossed yellow serial on dark green plate with border line; "1803 - OHIO - 1953" at bottom	none	A·12345; AB·1234; 12345·A; 1234·AB; A·1234·B	Issued in blocks by county	Commemorated Ohio's 150 years of statehood.
	1954	Embossed white serial on maroon plate with border line; "OHIO - 1954" centered at bottom	none	A·12345; AB·1234; 12345·A; 1234·AB; A·1234·B	Issued in blocks by county	
	1955	Embossed white serial on dark blue plate with border line; "1955 - OHIO" centered at bottom	none	A·12345; AB·1234; 12345·A; 1234·AB; A·1234·B	Issued in blocks by county	
	1956	Embossed white serial on dark green plate with border line; "OHIO - 1956" centered at bottom	none	A·12345; AB·1234; 12345·A; 1234·AB; A·1234·B	Issued in blocks by county	
	1957	Embossed white serial on maroon plate with border line; "1957 - OHIO" centered at bottom	none	A·12345; AB·1234; 12345·A; 1234·AB; A·1234·B	Issued in blocks by county	
	1958	Embossed white serial on dark blue plate with border line; "OHIO - 1958" centered at bottom	none	A·12345; AB·1234; 12345·A; 1234·AB; A·1234·B	Issued in blocks by county	
	1959	Embossed red serial on white plate with border line; "1959 - OHIO" centered at bottom	none	A·12345; AB·1234; 12345·A; 1234·AB; A·1234·B	Issued in blocks by county	
	1960	Embossed blue serial on yellow plate with border line; "OHIO - 1960" centered at bottom	none	A·12345; AB·1234; 12345·A; 1234·AB; A·1234·B	Issued in blocks by county	
	1961	Embossed white serial on green plate with border line; "1961 - OHIO" centered at bottom	none	A·12345; AB·1234; 12345·A; 1234·AB; A·1234·B	Issued in blocks by county	
	1962	Embossed white serial on maroon plate with border line; "OHIO - 1962" centered at bottom	none	12345; A·12345; AB·1234; 12345·A; 1234·AB; A·1234·B	Issued in blocks by county	
	1963	Embossed white serial on dark blue plate with border line; "1963 - OHIO" centered at bottom	none	12345; A·12345; AB·1234; 12345·A; 1234·AB; A·1234·B	Issued in blocks by county	
	1964	Embossed white serial on dark green plate with border line; "OHIO - 1964" centered at bottom	none	12345; A·12345; AB·1234; 12345·A; 1234·AB; A·1234·B	Issued in blocks by county	
	1965	Embossed red serial on white plate with border line; "1965 - OHIO" centered at bottom	none	12345; A·12345; AB·1234; 12345·A; 1234·AB; A·1234·B	Issued in blocks by county	
	1966	Embossed white serial on red plate with border line; "OHIO 1966" centered at bottom	none	12345; A 12345; AB 1234; 12345 A 1234 AB; A 1234 B	Issued in blocks by county	
	1967	Embossed white serial on blue plate with border line; "67 OHIO" centered at bottom	none	12345; A 12345; AB 1234; 12345 A 1234 AB; A 1234 B	Issued in blocks by county	Over 1.4 million plates on this base were destroyed in a fire at the plate shop at the Lebanon Correctional Institution in November 1966; replacement plates were manufactured in New York, Arkansas and Nebraska using these states' serial dies.
	1968	Embossed red serial on white plate with border line; "OHIO 68" centered at bottom	none	12345; A 12345; AB 1234; 12345 A 1234 AB; A 1234 B	Issued in blocks by county	Most plates manufactured in New York, using that state's serial dies, while the Lebanon plate shop was being repaired.
	1969	Embossed blue serial on white plate with border line; "69 OHIO" centered at bottom	none	12345; A 12345; AB 1234; 12345 A 1234 AB; A 1234 B	Issued in blocks by county	Some plates manufactured in New York, using that state's serial dies. Full manufacturing capacity at the Lebanon plate shop was restored by 1970.
	1970	Embossed scarlet serial on gray plate with border line; "OHIO 70" centered at bottom	none	12345; A 12345; AB 1234; 12345 A 1234 AB; A 1234 B	Issued in blocks by county	Issued in the colors of Ohio State University, in honor of its centennial.
	1971	Embossed black serial on yellow plate with border line; "71 OHIO" centered at bottom	none	12345; A 12345; AB 1234; 12345 A 1234 AB; A 1234 B	Issued in blocks by county	
	1972	Embossed yellow serial on dark blue plate with border line; "OHIO 72" centered at bottom	none	12345; A 12345; AB 1234; 12345 A 1234 AB; A 1234 B	Issued in blocks by county	
	1973	Embossed white serial on green plate with border line; "73 OHIO" centered at bottom	"SEAT BELTS FASTENED?" at top	12345; A 12345; AB 1234; 12345 A 1234 AB; A 1234 B	Issued in blocks by county	

=== 1974 to present ===
All Ohio passenger plates issued since October 2001 are valid for display today, provided they have been continuously registered. "Ohio Gold" plates, issued from August 1996 through September 2001, were replaced during 2022 due to readability issues arising from degradation of the reflective sheeting through exposure to humidity, rain, snow, and road salt.

Image	Dates issued	Design	Slogan	Serial format	Serials issued	Notes
	1974–75	Embossed green serial on reflective white plate with border line; "OHIO 74" centered at bottom	"SEAT BELTS FASTENED?" at top	123456; A 12345; AB 1234; 12345 A 1234 AB; A 1234 B	Issued in blocks by county	Revalidated for 1975 with stickers.
	1976–79	Embossed red serial on reflective white plate with border line; "OHIO" centered at bottom	none	123456; A 12345; AB 1234; 12345 A 1234 AB; A 1234 B	Issued in blocks by county	
	1980–84	Embossed blue serial with state-shaped separator on reflective white plate; "OHIO" centered at top	none	ABC•123	AAA•010 to approximately UFU•999	I and O used only as the second letter in serials; this practice continues today (except 2001–04). County sticker added at bottom of plate in 1983.
	1985 – December 1990	Embossed green serial with state-shaped separator on reflective white plate; "OHIO" centered at top	none	123•ABC	010•AAA to approximately 999•YOZ	
	January 1991 – November 1995	Embossed blue serial with state-shaped separator on reflective white plate; "OHIO" screened in blue centered at top	"the heart of it all!" screened in red between state name and serial	ABC•123	AAA•010 to XEU•999	
	November 1995 – July; 1996	Embossed blue serial with state-shaped separator on reflective white plate; "OHIO" screened in blue centered at top	"the heart of it all!" screened in red between state name and serial	ABC•123	XEV•010 to YZZ•999	Narrower serial dies. Both variants revalidated until 2002.
	August 1996 – mid-1997	"Ohio Gold": Embossed dark blue serial on reflective white and gold gradient plate; "OHIO" screened in dark blue centered at top	"the heart of it all!" screened in red between state name and serial	ABC 1234	AAA 1000 to approximately ARR 5900	Issued only to new registrants. Gold plates were revalidated until 2022, but plate numbers can be transferred to the most current design.
	Mid-1997 – September 2001	"Ohio Gold": Embossed dark blue serial on reflective white and gold gradient plate; "OHIO" screened in dark blue centered at top	"BIRTHPLACE OF AVIATION" screened in red between state name and serial	ABC 1234	ARR 5901 to approximately BIF 9999; CAA 1000 to approximately CVV 9999	Issued only to new registrants. Gold plates were revalidated until 2022, but plate numbers can be transferred to the most current design.
	October 2001 – February 2004	"Bicentennial": embossed dark blue serial on reflective white with Ohio Bicentennial Commission logo and red and blue bars	Ohio Bicentennial; Birthplace of Aviation	AB12CD	AA01AA to approximately FC99KV	Issued to new registrants and as replacements for 1991–96 plates. Letters I and O not used in this serial format.
	February 2004 – November 30, 2010	"Sunburst": embossed dark blue serial on reflective white with state seal graphic and red and blue bars. This license plate also is the second to have the '"Bicentennial"' font. It features a rising sun with its rays beaming brilliantly.	Sunburst; Birthplace of Aviation.	ABC 1234	DAA 1000 to EQZ 9999; EUJ 1000 to FAK 9999	Issued concurrently with the "Beautiful Ohio" base (below) from November 23, 2009. From this base onward, all special and vanity plates are flat instead of embossed.
	November 23, 2009 – April 14, 2013	"Beautiful Ohio": embossed dark blue serial on rolling hills with farm, distant skyline, and airborne biplane	Beautiful Ohio; Birthplace of Aviation	ABC 1234	ERA 1000 to EUH 9999; FAL 1000 to FVZ 9999	Originally issued as a no-cost alternative to the "Sunburst" base, before replacing it as the standard base on December 1, 2010. With elements designed by Frances Strickland, the plate has been described as "a bucolic affair", in contrast to the later "Ohio Pride" plate.
	April 15, 2013 – December 28, 2021	"Ohio Pride": embossed dark blue serial on word cloud background and red triangle resembling an airplane wing	Birthplace of Aviation; DiscoverOhio.com; 46 "slogans" total, including facts and famous names	ABC 1234	FWA 1000 to JCZ 9999; JEA 1000 to JPA 3505 (as of December 30, 2021)	Remaining "Beautiful Ohio" plates melted and recycled into this design so that materials were not wasted. "Ohio Pride" was designed by Aaron Roberts and chosen among four concept drawings put forward by the CCAD Design Group. The design was noted for its simplicity but also criticized for poor legibility. The plate was introduced as part of a coordinated branding campaign that also included a matching driver's license design. Only rear plates required beginning July 1, 2020, the change took place early in the 'J' series of serials.
	December 29, 2021 – present	"Sunrise in Ohio": screened dark blue serial on sunrise scene featuring skyline, hills, river, wheat field, and child swinging from a tree, with Wright Flyer, state shape and red banner with slogan at top	Birthplace of Aviation	ABC 1234	JDA 1000 to JDZ 9999; JRQ 1000 to LDL 2803 (as of Oct 5, 2026)	Beginning with this base, all new Ohio plates are now flat instead of embossed. Remaining "Ohio Pride" plates will be melted and recycled into this design so that materials are not wasted. An error in the initial design had the Wright Flyer flying backwards; around 35,000 plates were manufactured before the error was realized and corrected; these plates will also be melted and recycled.

== Alternative passenger plates ==
Image	Dates issued	Design	Slogan	Serial format	Serials issued	Notes
	1967–present	Red on yellow	none	123456; 1234567	3700000 to present	For DUI offenders with limited driving privileges. Issued since 1967 but rarely used before the plate became mandated on all DUI offenders in 2004.

Ohio state law authorizes the Bureau of Motor Vehicles to issue a number of specialty passenger plates, as defined in Ohio Rev. Code chapter 4503, sections 4 and 5.

== Renewal stickers ==
Designs of tax and renewal stickers used from 1968 to 1991

Designs of renewal stickers used since 1991

== Non-passenger plates ==
Image	Type	Dates issued	Design	Serial format	Serials issued	Notes
	Apportioned	2013–2021	As "Ohio Pride" passenger base, with "APPORTIONED" at bottom	PBC 1234	PVW 1000 to approximately PWT1999	
	Apportioned	2021–present	Screened dark blue serial on gradient blue and white; Wright Flyer, state shape and banner at top, "APPORTIONED" at bottom	PBC1234	Approximately PWT2000 to present	
	Commercial Trailer	2013–2021	As "Ohio Pride" passenger base, with "TRAILER" at bottom	TBC 1234	TQE 1000 to approximately TRY 2532	'TS' series used on Permanent plates.
	Commercial Trailer	2021–present	Screened dark blue serial on gradient blue and white; Wright Flyer, state shape and banner at top, "TRAILER" at bottom	TBC 1234	TTA 1000 to present	
	Permanent Trailer	2013–2021	As "Ohio Pride" passenger base, with "PERMANENT" at bottom	TSC 1234	TSA 1000 to approximately TSD 1500	
	Permanent Trailer	2021–present	Screened dark blue serial on gradient blue and white; Wright Flyer, state shape and banner at top, "PERMANENT" at bottom	TSC 1234	TSE 1000 to present	
	Motorcycle	2004–10	Similar to "Sunburst" passenger base	12ABC	01HHA to 99QOZ; 01RXD to 99TID	'Z' series used on Veteran Motorcycle plates.
	Motorcycle	2009–13	Similar to "Beautiful Ohio" passenger base	12ABC	01QPA to 99RXC; 01TIE to approximately 99VVL	'Z' series used on Veteran Motorcycle plates.
	Motorcycle	2013–15	Similar to "Ohio Pride" passenger base	12ABC	01WAA to 99YZZ	'Z' series used on Veteran Motorcycle plates.
	Motorcycle	2015–present	Similar to "Ohio Pride" passenger base	ABC12	AAA01 to present	'Y' series used on Veteran Motorcycle plates.
	Non-Commercial Trailer	2013–2021	As "Ohio Pride" passenger base	SBC 1234	SUE 1000 to approximately SZU 9999	
	Non-Commercial Trailer	2021–present	As "Sunrise in Ohio" passenger base	UBC 1234	UAA 1000 to present	
	Truck	1996–2001	As "Ohio Gold" passenger base, but with "TRUCK" in place of county name at bottom	PBC 1234	PAA 1000 to PCQ 9999	
	Truck	2001–04	As "Bicentennial" passenger base, but without Ohio Bicentennial Commission logo, and with "TRUCK" in place of blue band at bottom	PBC 1234	PCW 1000 to PEN 9999	
	Truck	2004–10	As "Sunburst" passenger base, but with "TRUCK" in place of blue band at bottom	PBC 1234	PEP 1000 to PGQ 9999; PGV 7000 to PHF 9999	
	Truck	2009–13	As "Beautiful Ohio" passenger base, but with "TRUCK" in place of graphics at bottom	PBC 1234	PGR 1000 to PGV 6999; PHG 1000 to PIA 9999	
	Truck	2013–2021	As "Ohio Pride" passenger base, with "TRUCK" at bottom	PBC 1234	PIC 1000 to PLB 9999; PMA 1000 to PMV 3474	
	Truck	2021–present	Screened dark blue serial on gradient blue and white; Wright Flyer, state shape and banner at top, "TRUCK" at bottom	PBC 1234	PLC 1000 to PLZ 9999; PMZ 1000 to present	

From 1976 until 1996, license plates for pickup trucks and other light truck-related vehicles (SUVs and conversion vans aside) were issued truck plates that said "Non Comm" (for "non-commercial truck") while semi-trucks were issued plates that said "Commercial". Since 1996, however, the more consumer-oriented truck plates now say "Truck" instead of "Non-Comm."

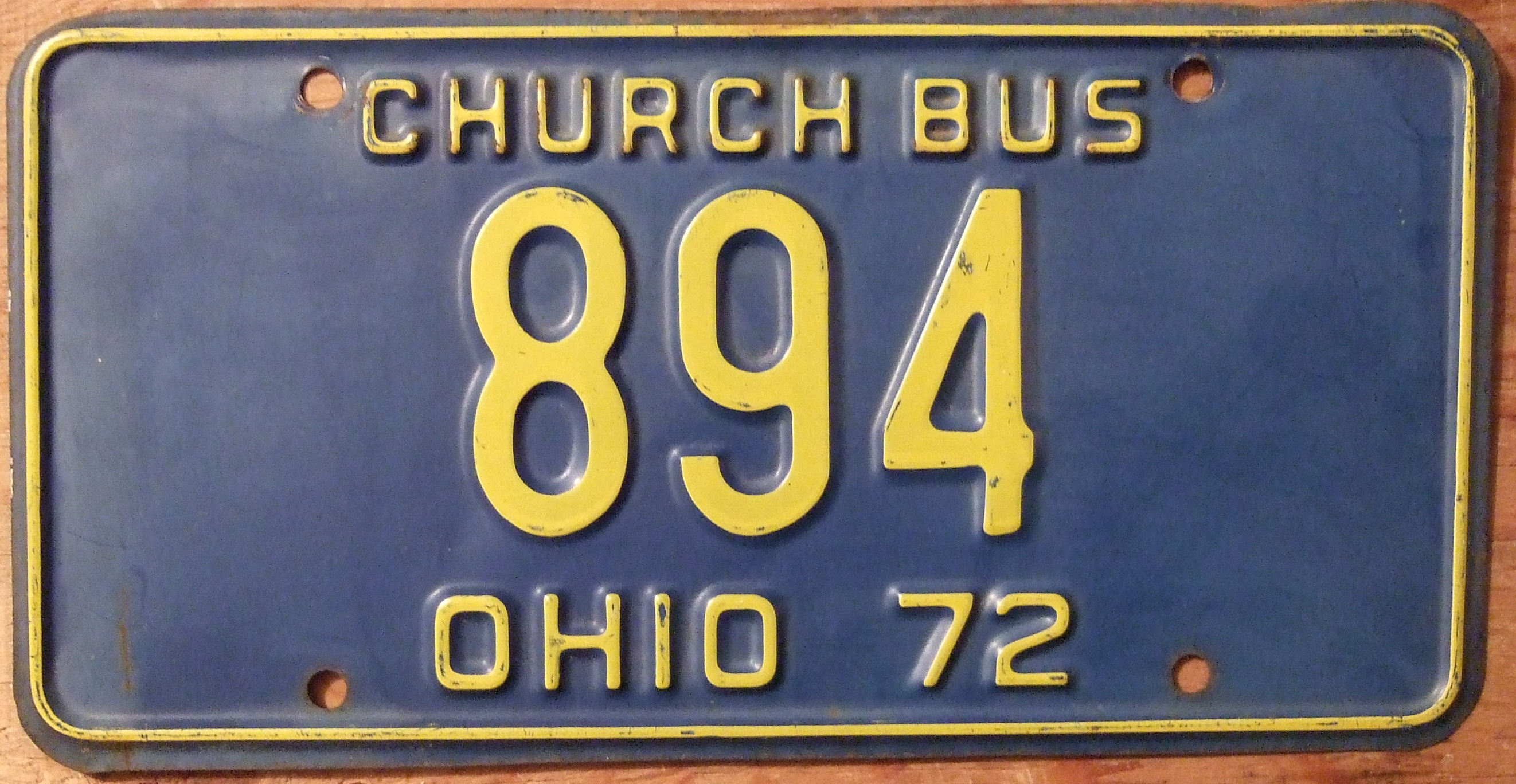
Church bus (1972)

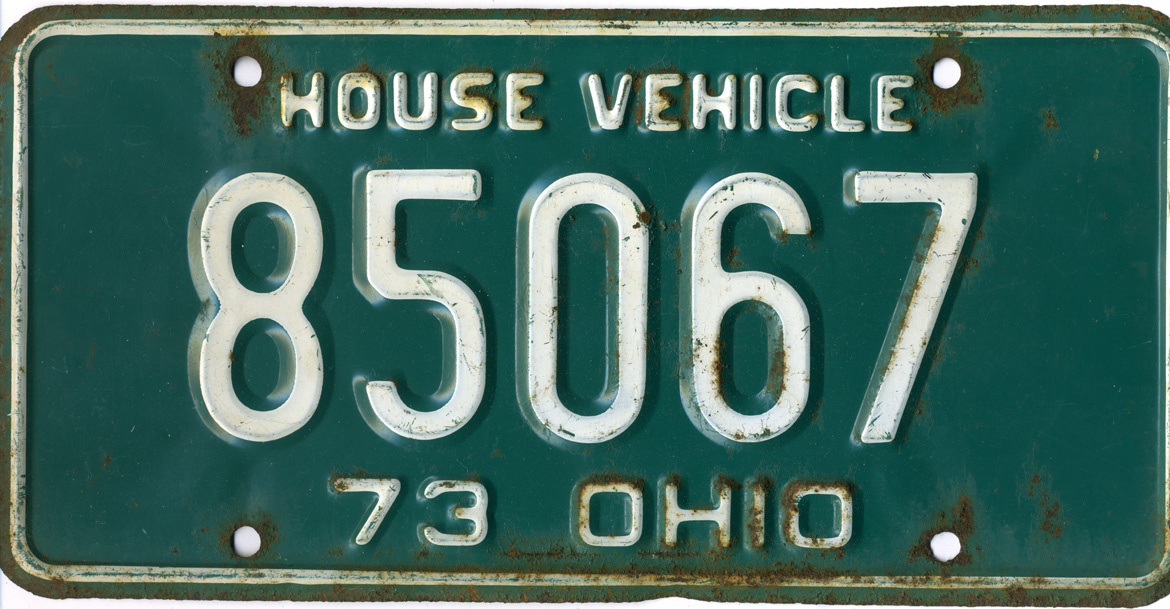
House Vehicle (1973)

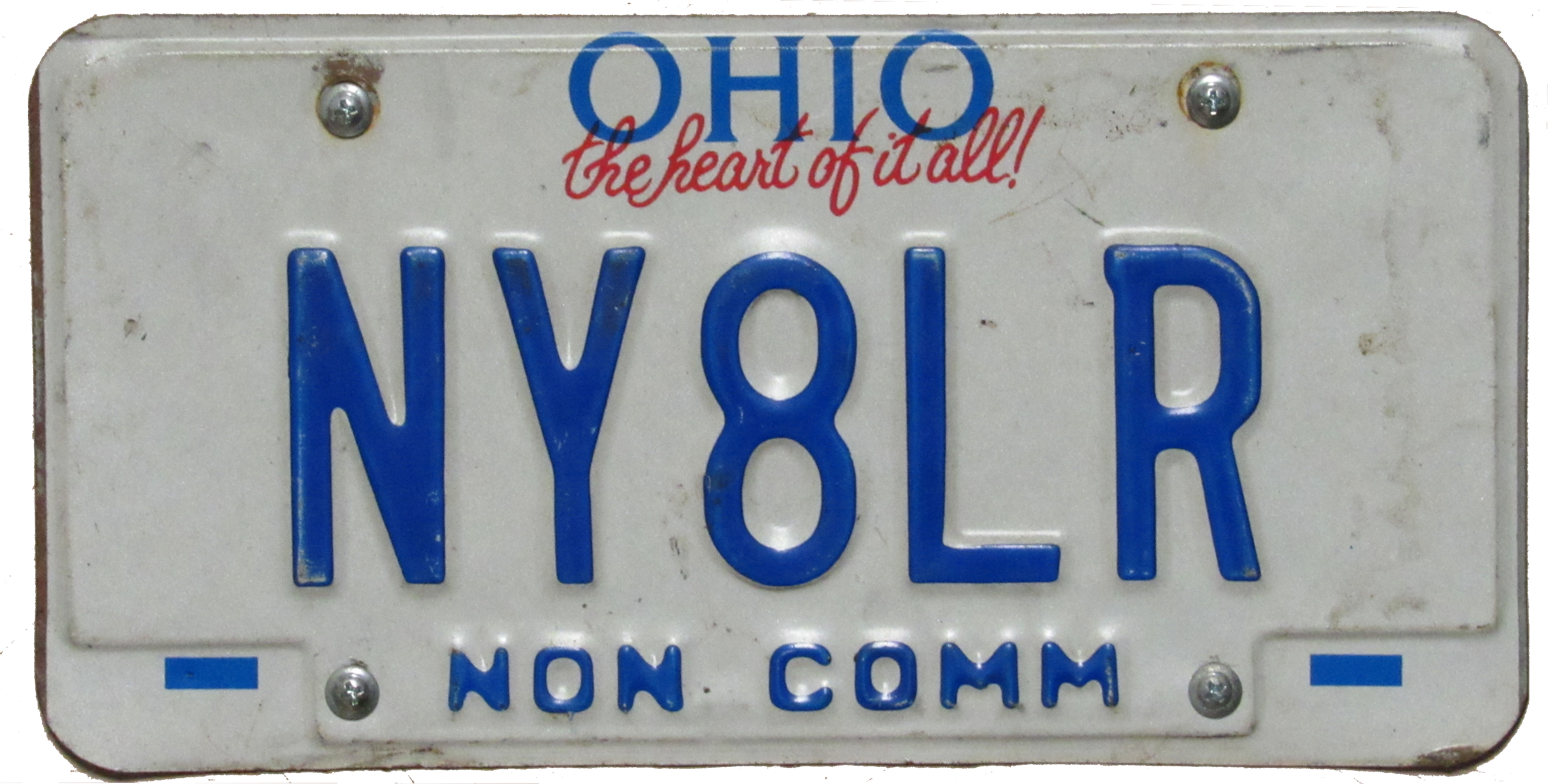
Non Commercial (1991-1995)

== Dealer/Manufacturer plates ==
Image	Dates issued	Design	Slogan	Serial format	Serials issued	Notes
	2021–present	Similar to the "Sunrise in Ohio" plate, but with a blue to white gradient background instead of the graphic background	DEALER at bottom	123 A1BC		

== Temporary tags ==
Vehicles purchased from a dealership are given a 30-day or 45-day temporary tag. The paper tag is filled out by hand. Since March 2001, it has featured a hologram. On a 2001-series temporary tag, the plate number is preprinted, while the expiration date and vehicle details are written in permanent marker. As of August, 2020, the Ohio Department of Public Safety issues print-on-demand temporary tags and will phase out traditional paper tags in January 2021.

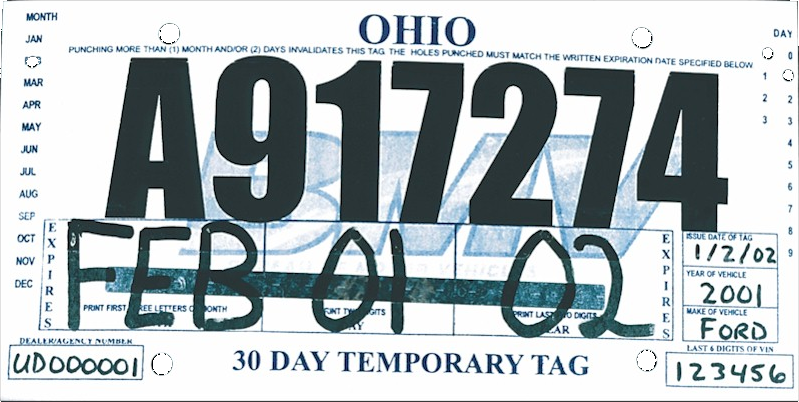
2002

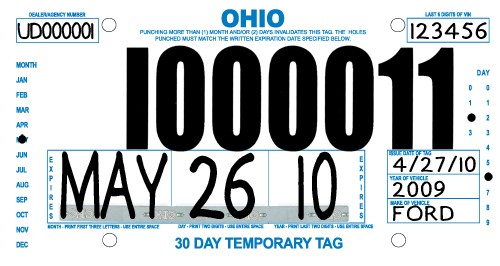
2010

== County coding ==
In 1992, Ohio began using a numerical county-coding scheme to indicate the county of registration. The scheme assigns a two-digit number to each of the state's 88 counties in alphabetical order, beginning with 01 for Adams County and ending with 88 for Wyandot County. The scheme has been used on specialty plates since its introduction, and was also used on standard passenger plates from 2001 until 2018.

The county number is displayed on red or white stickers placed at the bottom left corner the plate. The stickers also display the county name, in small print below the number.

=== List of county numbers ===
1. Adams
2. Allen
3. Ashland
4. Ashtabula
5. Athens
6. Auglaize
7. Belmont
8. Brown
9. Butler
10. Carroll
11. Champaign
12. Clark
13. Clermont
14. Clinton
15. Columbiana
16. Coshocton
17. Crawford
18. Cuyahoga
19. Darke
20. Defiance
21. Delaware
22. Erie
23. Fairfield
24. Fayette
25. Franklin
26. Fulton
27. Gallia
28. Geauga
29. Greene
30. Guernsey
31. Hamilton
32. Hancock
33. Hardin
34. Harrison
35. Henry
36. Highland
37. Hocking
38. Holmes
39. Huron
40. Jackson
41. Jefferson
42. Knox
43. Lake
44. Lawrence
45. Licking
46. Logan
47. Lorain
48. Lucas
49. Madison
50. Mahoning
51. Marion
52. Medina
53. Meigs
54. Mercer
55. Miami
56. Monroe
57. Montgomery
58. Morgan
59. Morrow
60. Muskingum
61. Noble
62. Ottawa
63. Paulding
64. Perry
65. Pickaway
66. Pike
67. Portage
68. Preble
69. Putnam
70. Richland
71. Ross
72. Sandusky
73. Scioto
74. Seneca
75. Shelby
76. Stark
77. Summit
78. Trumbull
79. Tuscarawas
80. Union
81. Van Wert
82. Vinton
83. Warren
84. Washington
85. Wayne
86. Williams
87. Wood
88. Wyandot

== Reserved series ==
On recent seven-character baseplates, the state has reserved certain letter series to be issued in coordination with specific car dealerships or leasing agencies.

Series	Assigned to
FAC	First Automotive Corp., Cincinnati
GLR	Grand Leasing and Sales
GAN	Ganley Automotive Lease
HON	Honda
HOM	Honda of Mentor
JAY	Jay Auto Group, Bedford
JEF	Jeff Wyler Automotive
JSL	Jake Sweeney Leasing, Cincinnati
LAS	Shaker Auto Leasing
LEX	Metro Lexus
LXS	Metro Lexus
MAL	Mike Albert Resale Center and Leasing, Cincinnati
MBZ	Mercedes-Benz
MCT	Motorcars Toyota, Cleveland Heights
MCH	Motorcars Honda, Cleveland Heights
MET	Metro Toyota, Cleveland
MGM	Marshall Goldman Motors
MKB	MKB Leasing, Marietta
MVP	Classic Auto Group (Cleveland area/Northeast Ohio)
NON	Nissan of North Olmsted
SUN	Sunnyside, Cleveland
SSA	Sunnyside Audi
SSH	Sunnyside Honda
SST	Sunnyside Toyota
TOB	Toyota of Bedford
TOY	Toyota
VCJ	Adventure Chrysler Jeep, Willoughby
WIN	Classic Auto Group (Cleveland area/Northeast Ohio)
