= Toledo Correctional Institution =

State prison in Toledo, Ohio

Coordinates: 41°40′51″N 83°30′41″W

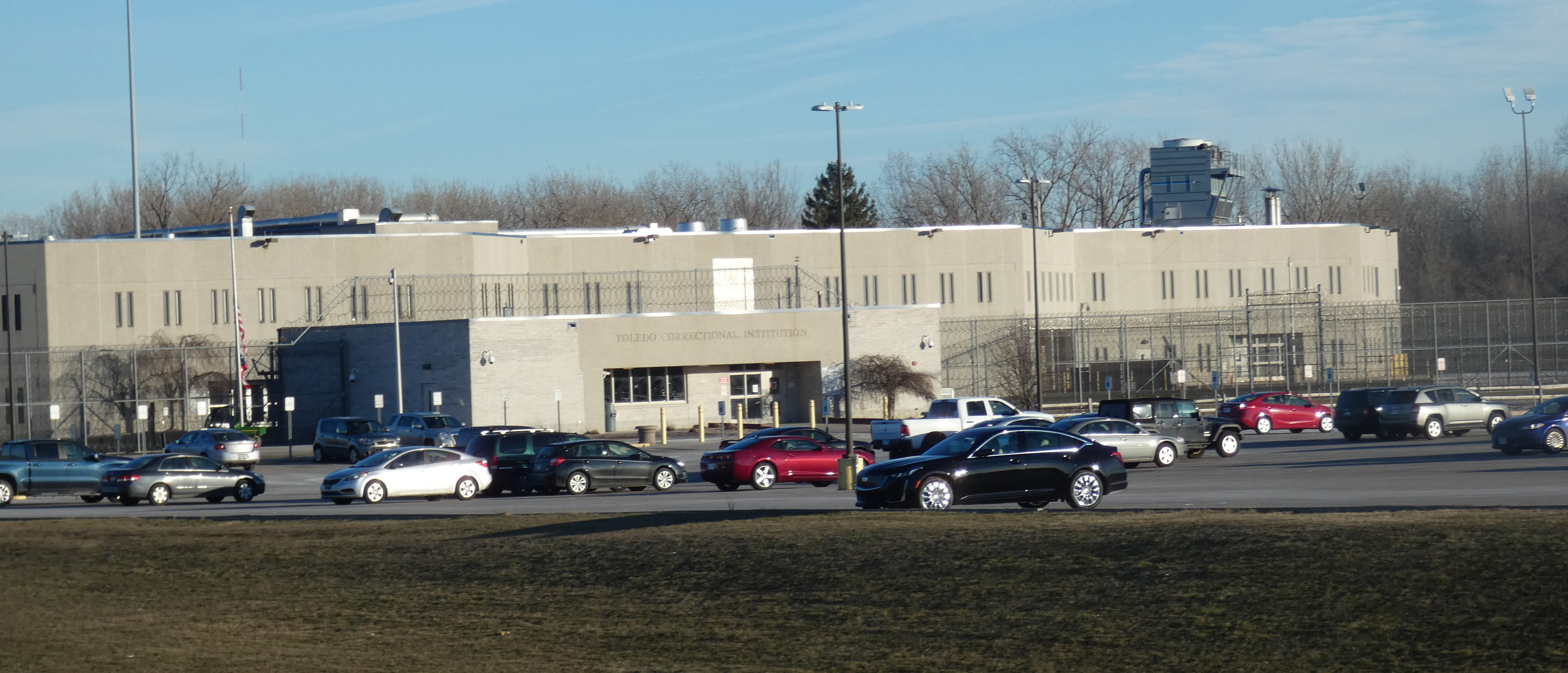
- Front portion of the prison.
- Interactive map of Toledo Correctional Institution
- Location: 2001 E Central Avenue Toledo, Ohio
- Status: open
- Security class: Maximum (level 3-4)
- Capacity: 1208
- Opened: 2000
- Managed by: Ohio Department of Rehabilitation and Correction

The Toledo Correctional Institution (ToCI) is a state prison for men located in Toledo, Lucas County, Ohio, owned and operated by the Ohio Department of Rehabilitation and Correction.

The facility was opened in 2000, and houses approximately 750 maximum security inmates. The Toledo Correctional Institution houses Protective Custody inmates Level 3 and above, Level 4 offenders, and ERH1, ERH2, and ERH 3 level inmates. ERH is the highest security levels in Ohio.

== Notable inmates ==
- Donald Harvey - Serial killer. Died during incarceration.
- John Parsons - Murdering a police officer. Was on the FBI Ten Most Wanted Fugitives list in 2006 for escaping from the Ross County Jail. Serving a life sentence.
- Daniel Groves - Convicted alongside his wife, Jessica, for the murder of their four-month-old son Dylan Groves.
- Gerson Fuentes - Child molester of a nine year old girl who was in national news in 2022
- Caleb Flynn - American Idol Contestant, Pastor, murdered wife in 2026.
