= London Correctional Institution =

Prison in Ohio, United States

Coordinates: 39°54′19″N 83°29′02″W

London Correctional Facility
- Interactive map of London Correctional Facility
- Location: 1580 State Route 56 SW London, Ohio
- Status: open
- Security class: mixed
- Capacity: 2500
- Opened: 1924
- Managed by: Ohio Department of Rehabilitation and Correction

The London Correctional Institution (LoCI) is located in Union Township, Madison County, just west of London, Ohio, 27 miles (43 km) southwest of Columbus. It was originally known as the London Prison Farm. From 1913 to 1925 it was a branch of the Ohio Penitentiary in Columbus. In 1925, it became a separate facility. The prison currently accommodates approximately: 2,500 adult males in three security levels: minimum, medium and close-security.

== Construction and Ohio State inmates ==
The site selected in 1913 for what was originally intended to become the new Ohio Penitentiary was in Madison County, Ohio, about 1.5 miles (2.4 km) northwest of London, Ohio. The state already owned 1,448 acres (586 ha) there and later acquired another 1,088 acres (440 ha), bringing the total tract to 2,989.67 acres (1,209.88 ha). Plans for a new penitentiary were later shelved, possibly because of World War I, and construction of the London Prison Farm began in the early 1920s. The main building was erected entirely by inmate labor under civilian supervision, as the state lacked sufficient funds to hire outside construction workers. In 1925, the London Prison Farm became a separate correctional institution.

=== Facilities for the inmates ===
The complex expanded over time. After the 1930 Easter Monday fire at the Ohio Penitentiary, another wing was added at London; completed in 1931, it provided additional housing for inmates transferred from the Ohio Penitentiary. South of the main institution, an honor dormitory completed in 1955 had a capacity of 332 inmates assigned to outlying farm projects and related work, including the dairy, granary, power plant, slaughterhouse and motor pool. By the late 1970s, the institution proper consisted of six two-story wings, while farm buildings, storerooms and factories accounted for 78 additional structures on the grounds.

== Present day ==
The London Correctional Institution now owns around 3,000 acres (12 km^{2}). Over $30 million have been spent to renovate the prison. As of November 2013, the population was 2,283 inmates. The prison has a staff of 379 employees.

=== Programs for the inmates ===
The London Correctional Institution provides programs for the inmates, such as the Family Life Centers and The New Beginnings Unit. Now, the facility has a reading room for inmates and their children. Inmates are also able to earn their GEDs and other academic diplomas. Vocational programs include auto technology, barbering, dental lab, HVAC (heating, ventilation, and air-conditioning), web based design, animal training, and culinary arts.
