= Robert Rembert =

American serial killer

- Ohio Department of Rehabilitation and Correction inmate photo c. 2019
- Born: Robert Gene Rembert, Jr. March 15, 1970 (age 56); Cleveland, Ohio, U.S.
- Convictions: Aggravated murder (2 counts); Voluntary manslaughter (3 counts)
- Penalty: 30 years to life in prison

Details
- Victims: 5+
- Span of crimes: 1997–2015
- Country: United States
- States: Ohio, possibly Pennsylvania
- Date apprehended: For the final time on September 21, 2015
- Imprisoned at: Lebanon Correctional Institution

Robert Gene Rembert Jr. (born March 15, 1970) is an American serial killer who committed at least five murders in Cleveland, Ohio, from 1997 to 2015. He was arrested due to DNA profiling, fully admitting his guilt at trial, for which he was sentenced to life imprisonment with a chance for parole in 30 years.

Authorities from Pennsylvania suspect Rembert of killing many more women while he was traveling there for his job as a truck driver. He is also suspected of killing more women in Cleveland and other local Ohio cities and towns.

== Early life ==
Robert Gene Rembert Jr. was born on March 15, 1970 in Cleveland, Ohio to father Robert Gene Rembert Sr. and an unknown mother. Little else is known about Rembert's childhood.

== 1997 murder ==
On December 23, 1997, Rembert, a then 27-year-old who worked as a Cleveland bus driver, got into an argument with 24-year-old Dadren Lewis at a parking lot, which resulted in Lewis being shot. At trial, his lawyers managed to convince the judge that it was unintentional, and in 1998, Robert was found guilty of manslaughter and served 6 years in jail. Rembert was released in 2004 and after, he returned to Cleveland and found a job as a truck driver, frequently abusing alcohol and living on modest means. At the time of his arrest, he was having financial difficulties and problems with housing, due to which, shortly before his arrest, he had to live with relatives and friends.

== 2015 murders ==
On September 21, 2015, Rembert was pulled over by police at a truck service stop in Medina County outside Cleveland. He was driving an SUV that belonged to 26-year-old Morgan Nietzel, who had been found shot to death in her Cleveland home the previous day. The body of 52-year-old Jerry Rembert, Robert Rembert's cousin who was providing lodging for Robert, had also been found. After his arrest, Rembert admitted that on the previous evening, he had gotten into an argument with his cousin Jerry, during which he shot him and Nietzel, a mutual friend of the two. After he killed them, Rembert stole several items and Nietzel's car.

== Exposure ==
During the subsequent investigation, a blood and saliva sample was taken from Rembert for testing. Based on results from a complete DNA profiling test, Rembert was linked to the murder of 31-year-old Kimberly Hall, who was found beaten and raped on June 10 of that year, and an older murder dating back to May 1997, when 47-year-old Rita Mae Payne was killed in Cleveland.

Rembert accepted a plea bargain from the authorities, admitting to all the killings and providing details for each. He said that at the time of the Payne murder, he was working as a bus driver and killed the woman by luring her into a public service toilet at the Cleveland bus station. Despite the fact that bus drivers and station workers were investigated, Robert slipped by unnoticed. Due to his job as a truck driver, visiting many cities in Ohio and Pennsylvania, he was investigated in the murders of several other girls and women who were engaged in prostitution and were killed under similar circumstances. So far, no new charges have been brought against him.

== Trial ==
On the basis of the plea bargain, Rembert was found guilty of four murders and on October 16, 2018, received a life imprisonment term with a chance of parole after 30 years. During the sentencing, he expressed remorse for what he had done and asked for forgiveness from the victims' relatives.

== See also ==
- List of serial killers in the United States
