= Richland Correctional Institution =

Prison in Ohio, United States

Coordinates: 40°47′11″N 82°30′02″W

- Interactive map of Richland Correctional Institution
- Location: 1001 Olivesburg Road Mansfield, Ohio
- Status: open
- Security class: minimum and medium
- Capacity: 2613
- Opened: 1998
- Managed by: Ohio Department of Rehabilitation and Correction

The Richland Correctional Institution (RiCI) is a state prison for men located in Mansfield, Richland County, Ohio, owned and operated by the Ohio Department of Rehabilitation and Correction.

The facility was opened in 1998, and houses a maximum of 2613 inmates at a mix of minimum and medium security levels.

== Notable Inmates ==
Inmate Name	Register Number	Status	Details
Robert Rembert	A753904	Serving a life sentences; eligible for parole hearing in 2045.	Convicted of murdering 5 people.
