= Pickaway Correctional Institution =

State Prison in Pickaway County, Ohio

Coordinates: 39°48′00″N 83°08′57″W

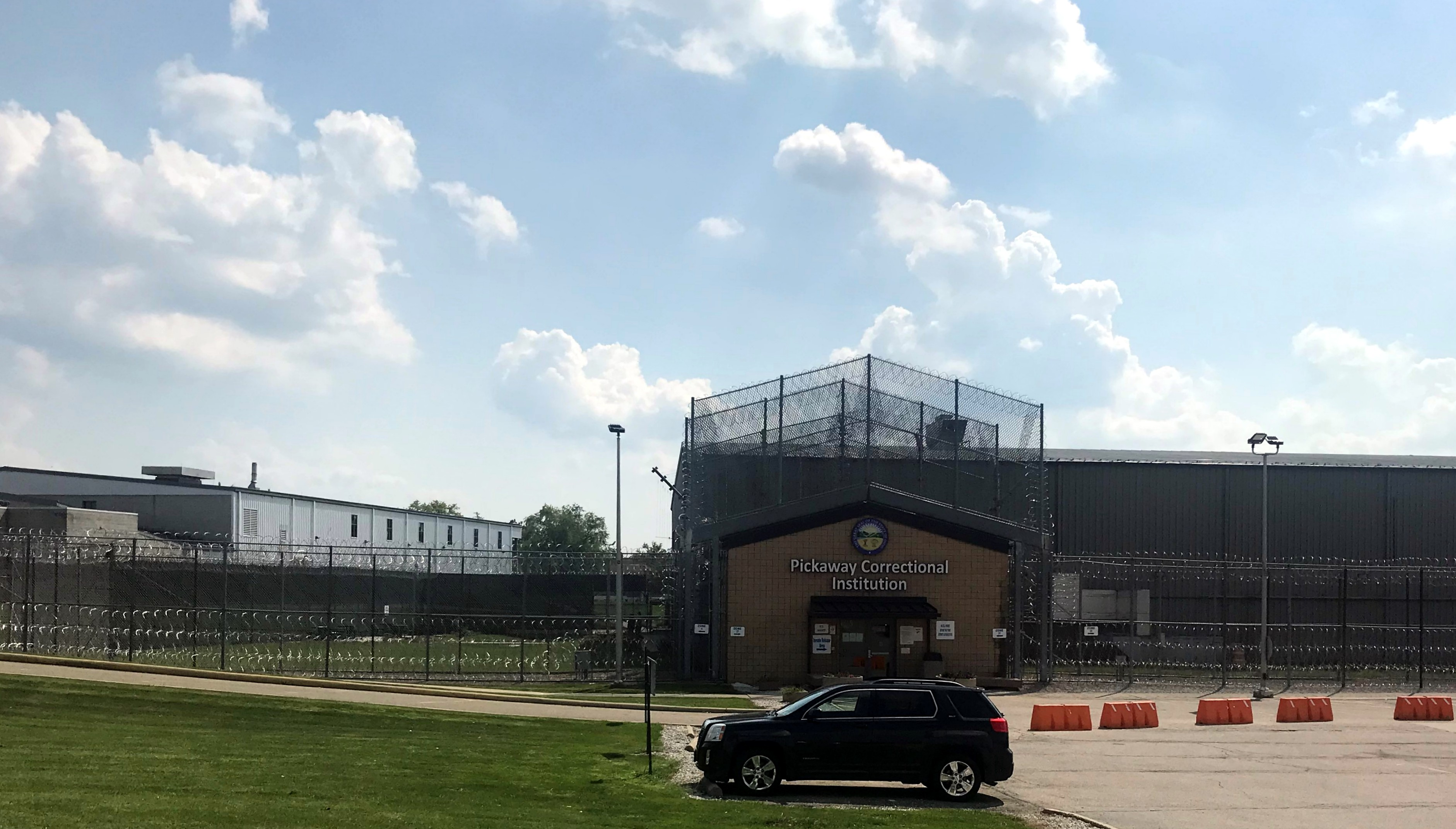
- Interactive map of Pickaway Correctional Institution
- Location: 11781 OH-762 Orient, Ohio
- Status: Open
- Security class: Mixed
- Capacity: 2088
- Opened: 1984
- Managed by: Ohio Department of Rehabilitation and Correction

The Pickaway Correctional Institution is a state prison located in Scioto Township, Pickaway County, just outside Orient, Ohio, United States which mostly houses minimum and medium security inmates. PCI was opened as a prison in 1984 after the buildings which formerly housed a facility for Ohio Department of Developmental Disabilities had been closed.

Although the structures were not built to house prisoners, Warden James Jackson modified the condemned buildings into secure housing for inmates. The prison houses 2107 inmates and 511 staff members (out of which 249 are the security staff). Inmates have an opportunity to take classes at Sinclair Community College or learn the printing trade at the OPI Print Shop. In 2000, former Ohio First Lady Hope Taft approached the Warden about establishing a reading room for the children who visited their incarcerated parents. The reading room opened within a few years and includes an inmate narrator who reads to the visiting children twice a day.

As of August 2022 the warden is Rochelle Moore.

The most notorious inmates of this prison were Posteal Laskey Jr., the Cincinnati Strangler, until his death by natural causes on May 29, 2007.

In 2017, the prison made headlines, as 4 inmates overdosed on opioids in a 2-day period.

In 2020, the prison again made national headlines as the second largest hotspot of diagnosed COVID-19 cases in the US.
