= Lebanon Correctional Institution =

Prison in Ohio, United States

Coordinates: 39°26′01″N 84°17′55″W

- Interactive map of Lebanon Correctional Institution
- Location: 3791 State Route 63 Lebanon, Ohio
- Status: open
- Capacity: 2465
- Opened: 1960
- Managed by: Ohio Department of Rehabilitation and Correction
- Director: Warden Michael Marinich

The Lebanon Correctional Institution is a prison in the United States operated by the Ohio Department of Rehabilitation and Correction in Warren County's Turtlecreek Township, about 4 miles (6.4 km) west of Lebanon and 2 miles (3.2 km) of Monroe and about 32 miles (51 km) north of Cincinnati, Ohio on State Route 63. It is immediately adjacent to another state prison, the Warren Correctional Institution, and was built in the 1950s on land purchased by the state when the Shaker settlement at Union Village closed in 1912.

The prison opened in 1960 and sits on 1,900 acres (770 ha) of land, much of which is used as a farm, including the raising of cows. In 2007, there were 2,532 inmates (1,347 black, 1,163 white, 22 Hispanic) with a total staff of 580, of which 340 are security staff. The prison budget for fiscal year 2005 was $41,082,012, an annual cost per inmate of $19,867.31.

Prison inmates manufacture license plates, license plate stickers, printing, and metal fabrication for institutional furniture in the prison industries plant.

The Lebanon prison was featured on an episode of the National Geographic Channel series Lockdown. The episode, titled "Predators Behind Bars", broadcast on March 4, 2007.

== Notable inmates ==
| Inmate Name | Register Number | Status | Details |
|---|---|---|---|
| Dellmus Colvin | A536490 | Serving a life sentence. | Convicted in 2006 of murdering 6 people. In 2011, he was convicted of another murder in New Jersey. |
| Matthew Starr Puccio | A667706 | Serving a life sentence. | Convicted in the 2012 murder of his girlfriend, Jessica Rae Sacco, in which her body was then dismembered with the help of 4 other people. |

- Billy Milligan The "Campus Rapist" whose defense centered on dissociative identity disorder.
