= Ohio Department of Rehabilitation and Correction =

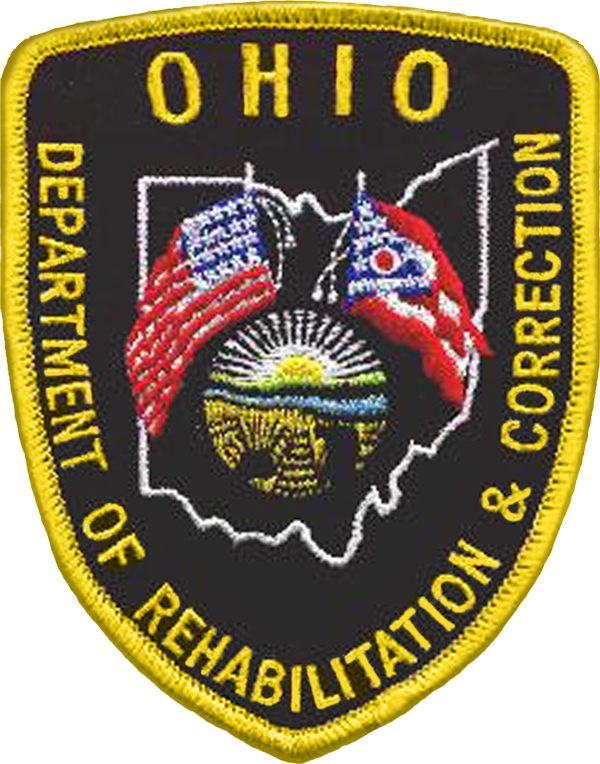
- Patch
- Abbreviation: ODRC
- Motto: Reduce recidivism among those we touch.

Agency overview
- Employees: 11,627
- Volunteers: 8,000+
- Annual budget: $2,545,285,316 USD (2026)

Operational structure
- Agency executive: Edward H. Banks III, Director (Interim)

Website
- http://www.drc.ohio.gov

The Ohio Department of Rehabilitation and Correction (DRC or ODRC) is the administrative department for the state of Ohio responsible for oversight of its adult prison system, along with its inmate population. It was established in 1972 under House Bill 494 of the 109th General Assembly of the Ohio House of Representatives. The responsibilities of ODRC are established in Section 5120 of the Ohio Revised Code and only hosts inmates with felonies and have a sentence of six months or more. Ohio's prison system is the sixth-largest in America, with 27 adult prisons and three facilities for juveniles (managed by the Ohio Department of Youth Services). Inmates are classified with a security level of 1 through 4, including a special classification level of "E", with level 1 being the lowest and least restrictive, while level "E" is the highest, with the most restrictive security control measures in place. There is also a security level between E and Level 4 where an inmate is classified as ET as a transitional program to downgrade their security level. In December 2025, the number of inmates in Ohio totaled 45,833, with a total budget for Fiscal Year 2026 of $2,545,285,316. ODRC headquarters are located in Columbus.

== History ==
The Ohio Department of Rehabilitation and Correction was established in 1972 under House Bill 494 of the 109th General Assembly of the Ohio House of Representatives. The responsibilities of ODRC are established in Section 5120 of the Ohio Revised Code and only hosts inmates with felonies and have a sentence of six months or more.

On April 11, 1993, a major riot broke out at the Southern Ohio Correctional Facility that lasted eleven days and resulted in ten deaths. It involved over 400 inmates and three different security threat groups. Nine inmates and one corrections officer were killed. Five inmates were deemed the "Lucasville Five" after prosecutors deemed them as ringleaders and all five were sentenced to death.

In 2019, the Cleveland Plain-Dealer reported that the department's inspection office had a single full-time employee, and used interns to conduct inspections.

In 2025, a PREA report reported that in 2024, there were 184 total inmate-on-inmate nonconsensual sexual acts allegations of which 11 were substantiated, 138 inmate-on-inmate abusive sexual contact allegations with 13 being substantiated, 60 inmate-on-inmate sexual harassment allegations and 11 were substantiated, 58 staff-on-inmate sexual misconduct allegations with 11 substantiated allegations, and 16 staff-on-inmate sexual harassment allegations with 2 being substantiated. Of the 45,281 inmates at the time of reporting, 1% had reported a PREA allegation.

In 2025, the reported three-year recidivism rate was 17.9%, down from the peak of 30.4% in 2009. 25.4% of all inmates admitted to ODRC without a high school degree obtain a degree before they're released. 16,104 inmates were enrolled in a Substance Use Disorder Treatment program. Of these, 67% completed the program.

In April 2026, it was reported that there were 11,627 total staff including, but not limited to 6,113 correction officers, 1,160 health care staff, 597 nursing staff, 650 non-nursing staff, 882 parole & community service staff, and 593 Operation Support Center staff. The Southern Ohio Correctional Facility hosted the most staff at 611 total staff.

=== Statistics ===
As of December 2025:

- 45,833 Total Inmates.
  - 42,105 males, 3,728 females.
  - 12 pregnant females.
  - 813 inmates serving life without parole.
- The average inmate was 41.3 years old.
  - 41.5 years for males, 39.4 years for females.
  - There are 26 inmates under 18 years old in ODRC custody.
    - 25 males & 1 female.
- 94.5% Security Level 3 or lower.
  - 5.5% Level 4 or higher including death row.
- The average stay was 2.61 years.

== Facilities ==
Facility	Code	Location	Notes
Allen-Oakwood Correctional Institution	AOCI	Lima	
Belmont Correctional Institution	BECI	St. Clairsville	
Chillicothe Correctional Institution	CCI	Chillicothe	
Correctional Reception Center	CRC	Orient	Reception for most male inmates
Dayton Correctional Institution	DCI	Dayton	Female prison
Franklin Medical Center	FMC	Columbus	Capacity: 272; Houses male and female inmates; Houses three death row inmates
Grafton Correctional Institution	GCI	Grafton	
Lake Erie Correctional Institution	LAECI	Conneaut	Operated by CoreCivic
Lebanon Correctional Institution	LeCI	Lebanon	
London Correctional Institution	LoCI	London	
Lorain Correctional Institution	LorCI	Grafton	Reception for male inmates from Stark, Summit, and Cuyahoga Counties
Madison Correctional Institution	MaCI	London	
Mansfield Correctional Institution	ManCI	Mansfield	
Marion Correctional Institution	MCI	Marion	
Noble Correctional Institution	NCI	Caldwell	
North Central Correctional Complex	NCCC	Marion	Operated by Management and Training Corporation
Northeast Ohio Correctional Center	NEOCC	Youngstown	Operated by CoreCivic
Northeast Reintegration Center	NERC	Cleveland	Female prison
Ohio Reformatory for Women	ORW	Marysville	Female prison; Reception for all female inmates; Houses death row for female inmates
Ohio State Penitentiary	OSP	Youngstown	Houses some death row inmates
Pickaway Correctional Institution	PCI	Orient	
Richland Correctional Institution	RICI	Mansfield	
Ross Correctional Institution	RCI	Chillicothe	Majority of death row inmates housed here
Southeastern Correctional Institution	SCI	Lancaster	
Southern Ohio Correctional Facility	SOCF	Lucasville	Death house location
Toledo Correctional Institution	ToCI	Toledo	
Trumbull Correctional Institution	TCI	Leavittsburg	
Warren Correctional Institution	WCI	Lebanon	One death row inmate

=== Juvenile Facilities ===
The Following Juvenile Correctional Facilities are operated by the Ohio Department of Youth Services.

- Circleville
- Cuyahoga Hills
- Indian River

=== Closed ===
- Hocking Correctional Facility (Closed 2018)
- Lima Correctional Institution (Closed 2004)
- Montgomery Education and Pre-Release Center (Closed 2004)
- North Coast Correctional Treatment Facility (merged with Grafton in 2011)
- Ohio Penitentiary (Closed 1984)
- Ohio State Reformatory (Closed 1990)
- Orient Correctional Institution (Closed 2002)

== Death row ==
The majority of male death row inmates are held at the Ross Correctional Institution, while others are held at Franklin Medical Center, Ohio State Penitentiary, and Warren Correctional Institution. Some that are considered a high security risk are held at the Ohio State Penitentiary and those with serious medical conditions are held at the Franklin Medical Center. The main men's death row was previously held at the Chillicothe Correctional Institution from 2011 until 2024. Female death row inmates are housed in the Ohio Reformatory for Women.

The main men's death row had been scheduled to move from Chillicothe Correctional Institution to Toledo Correctional Institution in the summer of 2017, however those plans were delayed and ultimately cancelled in 2018. Executions occur at the Southern Ohio Correctional Facility.

== Fallen Staff ==
Since the establishment of the Ohio Department of Rehabilitation and Correction, 26 staff members have died in the line of duty. They're listed with their title, name, facility, and end-of-watch date below:

- Guard Cyrus Sells - Ohio State Penitentiary - June 9, 1841
- Guard James Fancher - Ohio Penitentiary - July 14, 1849
- Guard Daniel Heavey - Ohio Penitentiary - January 19, 1865
- Guard Charles B. Lauderbaugh - Ohio Penitentiary - November 18, 1898
- Guard Henry J. Gearhart - Ohio Penitentiary - May 29, 1904
- Guard William H. Morehead - Ohio Penitentiary - December 23, 1905
- Guard Urban Wilford - Ohio State Reformatory - November 3, 1926
- Guard Grant Weakley - Junction City Prison - September 2, 1927
- Guard Frank B. Hanger - Ohio State Reformatory - October 6, 1932
- Guard Alfred E. Schmidt - Ohio State Reformatory - September 2, 1940
- Guard Walter W. Zimmer - Ohio State Penitentiary - April 19, 1948
- Guard Samuel P. Chesshir - Ohio State Penitentiary - April 22, 1948
- Correctional Officer Arthur Sprouse - Southern Ohio Correctional Facility - July 24, 1973
- Correctional Officer Gary P. Underwood - Southern Ohio Correctional Facility - July 24, 1973
- Parole Officer Robert A. White - Adult Parole Authority Cleveland - April 27, 1979
- Supervisor Eric Bowling - Southern Ohio Correctional Facility - February 2, 1984
- Teacher Beverly Jo Taylor - Southern Ohio Correctional Facility - June 7, 1990
- Correction Officer Thomas D. Davis, Jr - Mansfield Correctional Institution - June 26, 1992
- Correction Officer Robert B. Vallandingham - Southern Ohio Correctional Facility - April 14, 1993
- Correction Officer Dannis Lee Stemen - Allen Correctional Institution - July 5, 1994
- Correctional Case Manager Bonita Haynes - Lima Correctional Institution - August 6, 1996
- Correction Officer Shirlene A. Jenkins - Allen Correctional Institution - February 11, 1997
- Correction Officer Wayne Mitchell - Warren Correctional Institution - February 2, 2001
- Correction Officer Michael Wilson Douds - Madison Correctional Institution - April 5, 2003
- Lieutenant Rodney Osborne - Southern Ohio Correctional Facility - April 9, 2024
- Correction Officer Andrew Lansing - Ross Correctional Institution - December 25, 2024

== See also ==
- List of law enforcement agencies in Ohio
- List of United States state correction agencies
- List of U.S. state prisons
