= Belmont Correctional Institution =

Prison in St. Clairsville, Ohio, United States

Coordinates: 40°04′51″N 80°58′17″W

- Interactive map of Belmont Correctional Institution
- Location: 68518 Bannock Uniontown Road St. Clairsville, Ohio
- Status: open
- Security class: minimum and medium
- Capacity: 2713
- Opened: 1995
- Managed by: Ohio Department of Rehabilitation and Correction

The Belmont Correctional Institution (BeCI) is a state prison for men located in St. Clairsville, Belmont County, Ohio, owned and operated by the Ohio Department of Rehabilitation and Correction. The facility was opened in 1995, and houses a maximum of 2713 inmates at a mix of minimum and medium security levels.
