= Lorain Correctional Institution =

State prison in Grafton, Ohio

Coordinates: 41.2836°N 82.0155°W

- Interactive map of Lorain Correctional Institution
- Location: 2075 South Avon-Belden Road, Grafton, Ohio
- Capacity: 1089
- Opened: 1990
- Managed by: Ohio Department of Corrections

The Lorain Correctional Institution is a state prison in Grafton, Ohio, United States. It is run by the Ohio Department of Rehabilitation and Correction as a reception & distribution center for the northern half of the state. It stands adjacent and to the north of Ohio's Grafton Correctional Institution.

As of August 2013 Lorain was called one of the state's most overcrowded prisons. In a facility designed for 1089 prisoners, Lorain housed 1473 and stood at 135% capacity, reflecting overcrowded conditions in all of Ohio's state prisons.

== Notable Inmates ==
Name	Number	Sentence	Crime
Jeffrey Dahmer	A256489	Life with the possibility of parole after twenty years in Ohio, life without parole in Wisconsin.	Murdered 18-year-old Steven Hicks, was transferred to LorCI in May 1992 for a 45-minute trial.
