= Orient, Ohio =

- Census-designated place
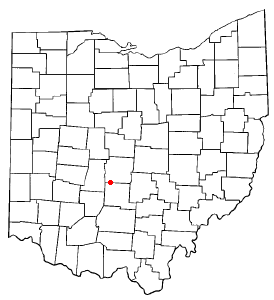
- Location of Orient, Ohio

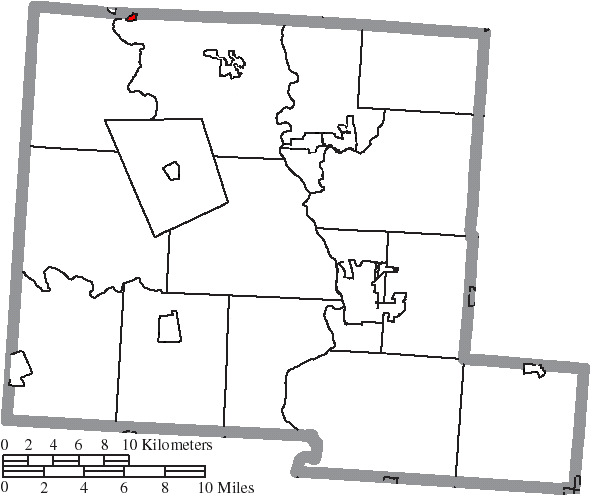
- Location of Orient in Pickaway County
- Coordinates: 39°48′20″N 83°09′10″W
- Country: United States
- State: Ohio
- County: Pickaway
- Township: Scioto

Area
  - Total: 0.16 sq mi (0.41 km^{2})
  - Land: 0.15 sq mi (0.40 km^{2})
  - Water: 0.0039 sq mi (0.01 km^{2})
- Elevation: 837 ft (255 m)

Population (2020)
  - Total: 246
  - Density: 1,608.4/sq mi (621.01/km^{2})
- Time zone: UTC-5 (Eastern (EST))
  - Summer (DST): UTC-4 (EDT)
- ZIP code: 43146
- Area code: 614
- FIPS code: 39-58800
- GNIS feature ID: 2771741

Orient is a census-designated place and former village in Pickaway County, Ohio, United States. The population was 246 at the 2020 census.

Orient is home to the Pickaway Correctional Institution and the Correctional Reception Center.

== History ==
Orient was established as a station on the Baltimore and Ohio Railroad in the northwest corner of Scioto township.

Local residents began seeking dissolution in January 2012. Thirty-three signatures were collected, one more than required by Ohio law to gain ballot access, but the county board of elections rejected the petition when it was found to have more signatures than those certified by the petition circulator. A new petition resulted in a May 2013 vote, in which the village residents supported dissolution by a margin of 38–30.

== Geography ==
According to the United States Census Bureau, the village has a total area of 0.12 sqmi (0.31 km^{2}), all land.

== Demographics ==
Historical population
Census	Pop.	Note	%±
1960	310		—
1970	313		1.0%
1980	283		−9.6%
1990	273		−3.5%
2000	269		−1.5%
2010	270		0.4%
2020	246		−8.9%
US Decennial Census

=== 2010 census ===
As of the 2010 United States census, there were 270 people, 96 households, and 67 families in the village. The population density was 2250/sqmi (869/km^{2}). There were 100 housing units at an average density of 833/sqmi (322/km^{2}). The racial makeup of the village was 96.3% White, 0.7% African American, 2.2% Native American, and 0.7% from two or more races. Hispanic or Latino people of any race were 0.4% of the population.

There were 96 households, of which 30.2% had children under the age of 18 living with them, 49.0% were married couples living together, 12.5% had a female householder with no husband present, 8.3% had a male householder with no wife present, and 30.2% were non-families. 19.8% of all households were made up of individuals, and 5.2% had someone living alone who was 65 years of age or older. The average household size was 2.81 and the average family size was 3.31.

The median age in the village was 38.5 years. 23.3% of residents were under the age of 18; 8.8% were between the ages of 18 and 24; 27% were from 25 to 44; 29.3% were from 45 to 64; and 11.5% were 65 years of age or older. The gender makeup of the village was 51.5% male and 48.5% female.

=== 2000 census ===
As of the 2000 United States census, of 2000, there were 269 people, 95 households, and 72 families residing in the village. The population density was 2,168.3 inhabitants per square mile (837.2/km^{2}). There were 102 housing units at an average density of 822.2 per square mile (317.5/km^{2}). The racial makeup of the village was 98.88% White and 1.12% Native American.

There were 95 households, out of which 44.2% had children under the age of 18 living with them, 54.7% were married couples living together, 13.7% had a female householder with no husband present, and 23.2% were non-families. 18.9% of all households were made up of individuals, and 8.4% had someone living alone who was 65 years of age or older. The average household size was 2.83 and the average family size was 3.19.

The village population contained 31.6% under the age of 18, 9.7% from 18 to 24, 30.1% from 25 to 44, 19.7% from 45 to 64, and 8.9% who were 65 years of age or older. The median age was 31 years. For every 100 females, there were 110.2 males. For every 100 females age 18 and over, there were 91.7 males.

The median income for a household in the village was $33,333, and the median income for a family was $38,750. Males had a median income of $31,250 versus $22,344 for females. The per capita income for the village was $15,515. About 14.6% of families and 11.5% of the population were below the poverty line, including 7.9% of those under the age of eighteen and none of those 65 or over.

== Notable person ==
- Patti Harrison (born 1990), actress and comedian.

== Gallery ==
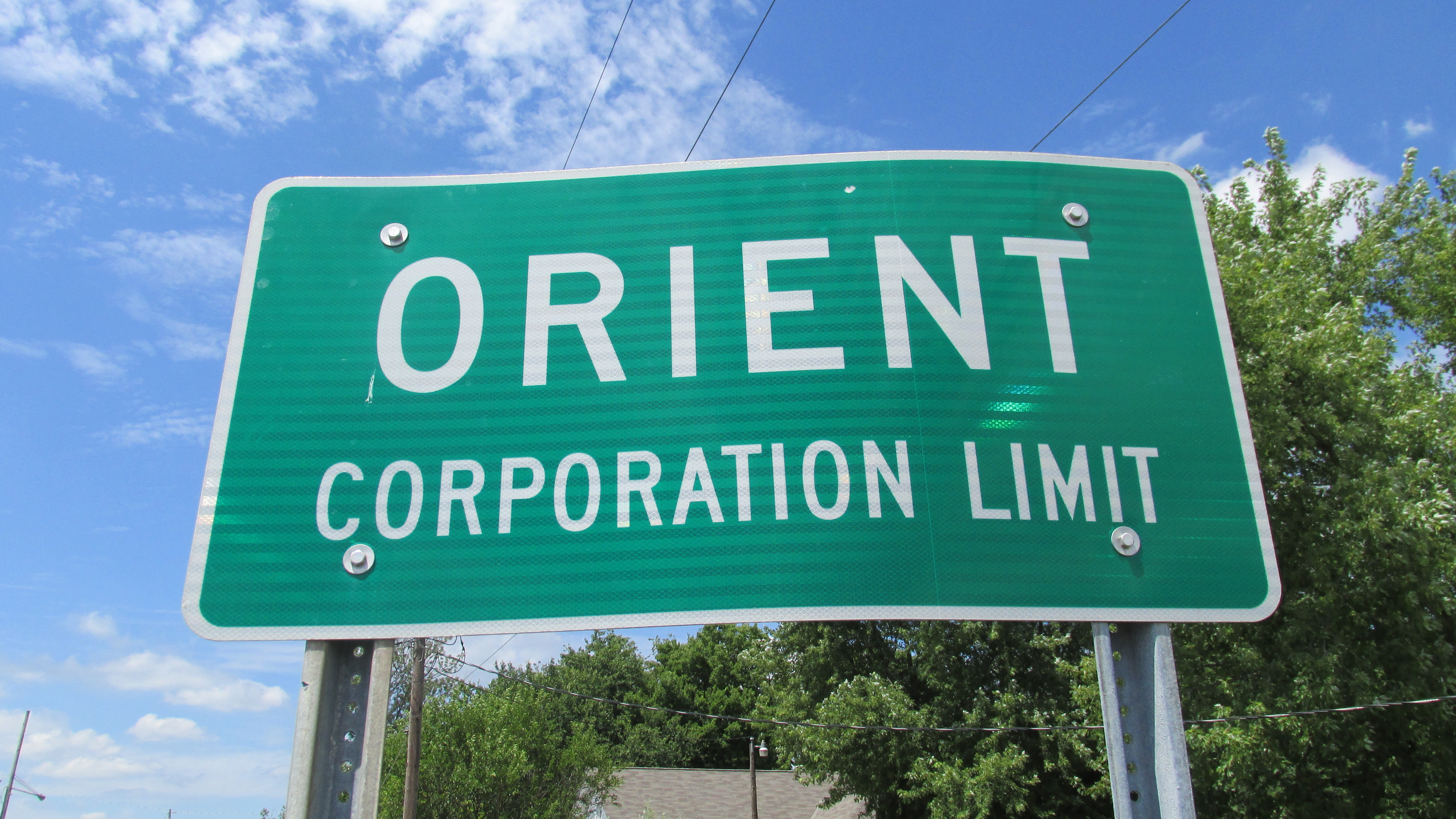
Orient corporation limit sign

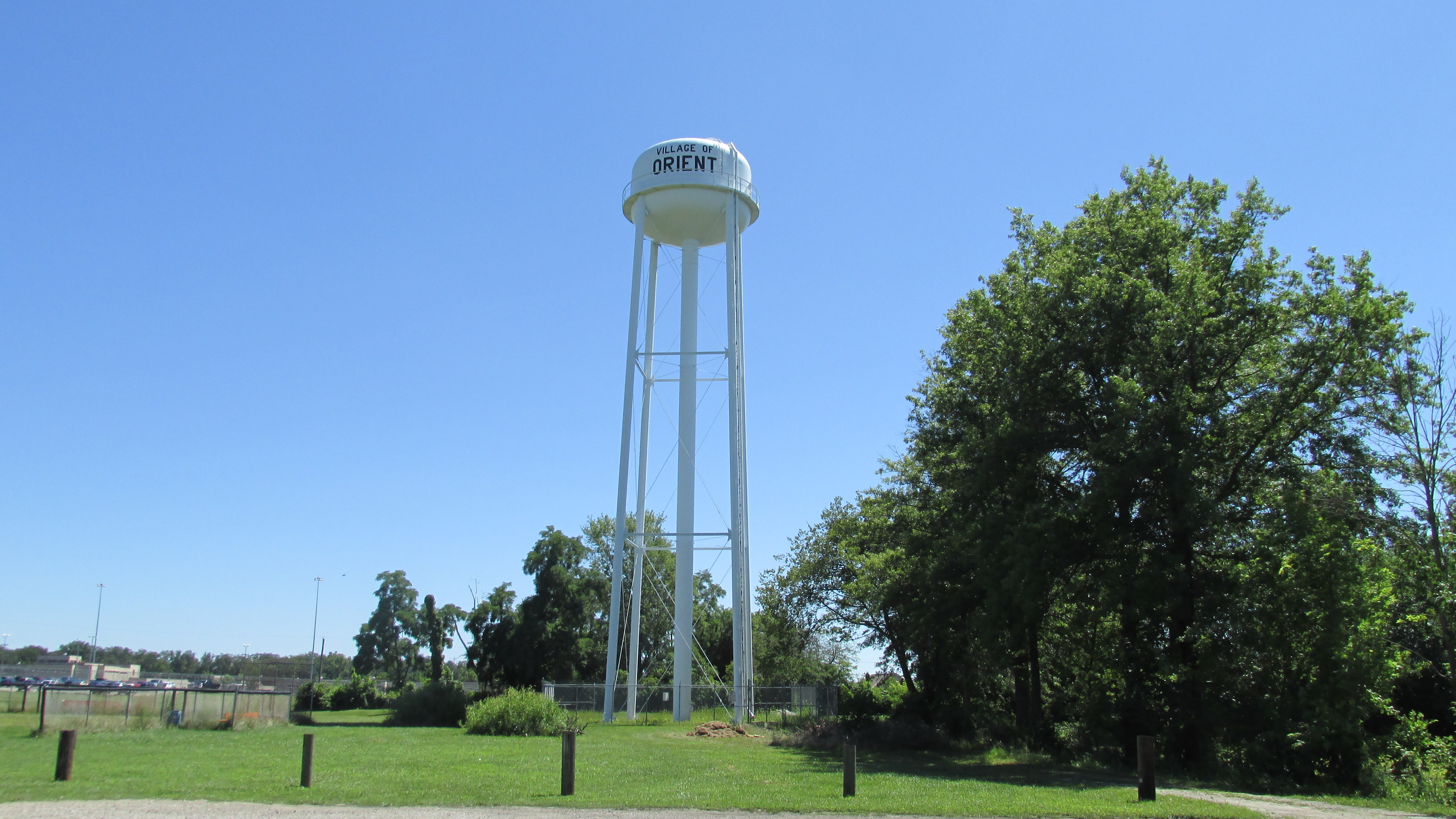
Water tower in Orient
