= List of people from Canton, Ohio =

This list organizes and collects the names of notable people who are known for their birth, residency or other association with Canton, Ohio.

== Arts and entertainment ==
- Jake Abel, actor
- James B. Allardice, Emmy Award-winning television writer
- Matt Bors, Pulitzer Prize-nominated political cartoonist and creator of Idiot Box web comic
- Brannon Braga, television producer, director and screenwriter
- Rowland Brown, director and screenwriter
- Frank De Vol, composer, arranger, actor
- Abastenia St. Leger Eberle, sculptor
- Randall Craig Fleischer, philharmonic conductor
- Peggy Ann Garner, actress
- Macy Gray, R&B singer
- Inhale Exhale, Christian metal band
- Joshua Jay, magician
- James Karales, major civil rights-era photographer
- Kathryn Karipides, choreographer and principal dancer
- Karl King, composer and bandleader
- Mark Kozelek, musician
- Enoch Light, bandleader and violinist
- Lovedrug, indie band
- Charles R. Macauley, Pulitzer Prize-winning cartoonist
- Marilyn Manson (born Brian Hugh Warner), rock singer of the band of the same name
- Eddie McClintock, actor
- Richard Miller, opera singer, voice teacher, professor at Oberlin Conservatory, author
- The O'Jays, soul group; a street in northeast Canton is named the O'Jays Parkway
- Jack Paar, host of The Tonight Show; namesake of a street named in northeast Canton
- Jean Peters, actress; was married to Howard Hughes
- Relient K, Christian rock band
- H. Robert Reynolds, band conductor
- Boz Scaggs, musician
- Jeff Shreve, sports announcer
- Blanche Thebom, opera singer
- Jeff Timmons, singer, 98 Degrees
- Nate Torrence, actor
- Steve Tracy, actor
- Trippie Redd, rapper
- Joe Vitale, musician, has played with Joe Walsh, The Eagles, Crosby, Stills & Nash, Michael Stanley Band and The Chylds
- Kelly Wearstler, interior designer; Playboy playmate
- Lee Wilkof, Broadway actor
- Nicole Wood, Playboy playmate

== Politics ==
- Frank T. Bow, U.S. representative from Ohio
- Lafayette Caskey, Wisconsin state legislator
- Leroy John Contie Jr., U.S. circuit judge
- Andrew W. Cordier, U.N. official and president of Columbia University
- Stephen A. Day, U.S. representative from Illinois
- Hiram Griswold, Ohio state senator and defense lawyer for John Brown
- Shelley Hughes, Alaska state legislator
- Frank Lavin, U.S. ambassador to Singapore
- Susie Lee, U.S. representative from Nevada
- Benjamin F. Leiter, mayor of Canton and U.S. representative from Ohio
- William A. Lynch, lawyer and politician
- Ida Saxton McKinley, 29th first lady of the United States, wife of William McKinley
- William McKinley, 25th U.S. president; interred in Canton at the McKinley National Memorial
- Alan Page, justice of the Minnesota Supreme Court and professional football player
- John A. Scali, U.S. ambassador to the United Nations
- Kirk Schuring, Ohio state legislator

== Sports ==
- Todd Blackledge, football player, Kansas City Chiefs, Pittsburgh Steelers; college football commentator
- Dick Cunningham, NBA player for the Milwaukee Bucks and Houston Rockets, 1971 NBA champion
- Dan Dierdorf, football player, television commentator, College and Pro Football Hall of Famer
- Mike Doss, football player
- Wayne Fontes, football player and coach, Detroit Lions
- Dustin Fox, football player, Buffalo Bills; nephew of Tim Fox
- Tim Fox, football player, New England Patriots, San Diego Chargers, Los Angeles Rams; uncle of Dustin Fox
- Gary Grant, basketball player, L.A. Clippers, New York Knicks, Miami Heat, Portland Trail Blazers
- John Grimsley, football player, University of Kentucky, Houston Oilers, Miami Dolphins
- Ronnie Harris, boxer, gold medalist, lightweight, 1968 Summer Olympics
- Brian Hartline, head football coach, University of South Florida; brother of Mike Hartline
- Mike Hartline, former quarterback for the Kentucky Wildcats football team, former member of New England Patriots; brother of Brian Hartline
- Michael Hawkins, basketball player
- Ralph Hay, National Football League founding contributor
- Dirk Hayhurst, baseball player
- Dick Himes, football player, Green Bay Packers
- Phil Hubbard, basketball player and coach, Olympic gold medalist
- Tim Huffman, football player, Green Bay Packers
- Chuck Hutchison, football player
- Kosta Koufos, basketball player, Utah Jazz, Denver Nuggets and Greece national team; former Ohio State Buckeyes player
- Kirk Lowdermilk, football player
- Jamar Martin, football player
- CJ McCollum, basketball player, Portland Trail Blazers
- Josh McDaniels, American football coach
- Keith McLeod, basketball player
- Raymar Morgan, professional basketball player for Barak Netanya in Israel
- Marion Motley, football player
- Thurman Munson, baseball player, 1976 American League Most Valuable Player, 7-time All-Star
- Mark Murphy, football player, Green Bay Packers
- Don Nehlen, football coach, College Football Hall of Fame
- Alan Page, football player, College and Pro Football Hall of Famer
- Darryn Peterson, five-star recruit and one of the top players in the 2025 recruiting class
- Kenny Peterson, football player
- Bob Pickard, football player
- John Pont, college football coach
- Ed Poole, baseball player
- Renee Powell, former LPGA Golfer
- Ed Rate, football player
- Nick Roman, football player
- Ernie Roth, professional wrestling manager known as Abdullah Farouk and The Grand Wizard of Wrestling
- George Saimes, football player 1963–1972, Buffalo Bills, Denver Broncos, member of American Football League All-Time Team (first team, defense)
- Eric Snow, basketball player; brother of Percy Snow
- Percy Snow, football player, Kansas City Chiefs; brother of Eric Snow
- Larry Snyder, track and field athlete, Ohio State coach for Jesse Owens
- Chris Spielman, football player, College Football Hall of Fame
- Rick Spielman, former general manager of the Minnesota Vikings; brother of Chris Spielman
- LeRoy Sprankle, high school multi-sport coach, author, general manager of the Canton Independents
- Charley Stanceu, baseball player New York Yankees, Philadelphia Phillies
- Nick Weatherspoon, Illinois and professional basketball player
- Don Willis, pool player
- Dave Wottle, gold medalist in the 800 meter run at the 1972 Summer Olympics

== Other ==
- Mark Aldenderfer, archaeologist and anthropologist
- Mother Angelica, Roman Catholic nun and foundress of the Eternal Word Television Network
- Christine Craft, broadcast journalist
- Bobby Lee Cutts, police officer convicted in the murder of Jessie Davis
- Thomas Dillon, serial killer
- Helias Doundoulakis, Greek-American soldier, OSS spy, and designer of the Arecibo Antenna, once the world's largest radio telescope
- Ted Henry, broadcast journalist
- James Huberty, mass murderer
- Reuben Klamer, inventor of The Game of Life and various other toys; inducted into the Toy Industry Hall of Fame; honored by the Smithsonian Institution
- Don Mellett, newspaper editor
- Marshall Rosenberg, creator of Nonviolent Communication
- Bob Shaheen, retired businessman
- Rhoda Wise, stigmatist named a Servant of God by the Roman Catholic Church
