= Karipidis =

Karipidis or Karipides is a surname. Notable people with the surname include:

- Christos Karipidis, Greek footballer
- Kathryn Karipides, American choreographer, dancer, & professor
- Theoklitos Karipidis (born 1980), Greek volleyball player
