= COVID-19 pandemic in Ohio =

- Map of the outbreak in Ohio by confirmed new infections per 100,000 people over 14 days (updated March 27, 2025) 1,000+ 500–1,000 200–500 100–200 50–100 20–50 10–20 0–10 no cases
- Disease: COVID-19
- Pathogen: SARS-CoV-2
- Location: Ohio, U.S.
- Index case: Cuyahoga County
- Arrival date: January 2, 2020
- Confirmed cases: 3,944,906
- Hospitalized cases: 158,788
- Critical cases: 16,088
- Recovered: 3,885,279
- Deaths: 44,976

Government website
- coronavirus.ohio.gov

The COVID-19 pandemic was confirmed to have reached the U.S. state of Ohio on March 9, 2020, when the state's first cases were reported. The first death from COVID-19 in Ohio was reported on March 19. Subsequently, records supported by further testing showed that undetected cases had existed in Ohio since early January, with the first confirmed death on March 17. By April 23, Ohio had 656 confirmed deaths; by May 1, there were 1,002 confirmed deaths. Accurate data was difficult to obtain due to limited test availability. By December 12, a total of 553,461 cases had been reported leading to 31,803 hospitalizations and 7,477 deaths.

As of March 27, 2025, Ohio has administered the updated vaccine, first available August 2024, to 1,234,206 individuals, or 10.56% of the population, a change of 3,627 in the previous week. As of May 11, 2023, the state department of health reported 89,950 hospitalizations and 27,084 deaths since January 1, 2021, among individuals not reported as fully vaccinated, and 6,801 hospitalizations and 1,534 deaths among fully vaccinated individuals in the same time period.

== Spread of virus ==
=== 2020 ===
==== March ====
On March 9, Governor Mike DeWine reported Ohio's first 3 cases in Cuyahoga County, a couple who had returned from a Nile River cruise, and a man who had returned from an annual conference in Washington, D.C., where other cases of coronavirus had been reported. Two days later, a fourth case, and the first instance of community spread, was confirmed by DeWine in Stark County. Later tests showed the first case was February 15.

By March 13, there were a total of 13 cases, with 159 others under observation. Within a week the first death was announced. Mark Wagoner, Sr, a prominent Toledo attorney and friend of DeWine, died March 19. Later tests showed the first coronavirus death had been March 17.

By March 23, there were a cumulative 442 COVID-19 cases, 6 of which resulted in death. By April 5 there were 4,043 cases, 1,104 hospitalizations including 346 ICU admissions, and 119 deaths. As of April 9, twenty percent of cases involved healthcare workers. By April 13 there were 6,975 cases, 2,033 hospitalizations including 613 ICU admissions, and 274 deaths.

==== April ====
On April 14, Ohio had an additional 50 deaths for a total of 324.

By April 17, the state had 9,107 confirmed and probable cases including 418 confirmed and probable deaths. On the 25th the number of cases reached 15,587 and the number of deaths reached 711. By April 28 Ohio had 16,769 cases, 3,340 hospitalizations including 1,004 ICU admissions, and 799 deaths. On April 28, Vinton County first had cases reported to the state, so all 88 counties in Ohio had confirmed cases. By May 4, there were 20,474 cases reported, including 1,056 deaths.

On April 23, nearly 80% of inmates tested positive at two overcrowded Ohio prisons. At Marion Correctional Institution, there were 2,011 infected inmates and 157 infected workers, with two inmate and one worker deaths. At Pickaway Correctional Institution there were 1,555 infected inmates, 73 infected employees, and ten inmate deaths.

==== May ====
On May 12, Ohio had reached 25,250 total cases, including 1,232 ICU admissions and 1,436 deaths. On May 12, the state department of health noted that antibody tests showed presence of the disease as early as January 7, with positive results in several counties in January.

On May 20, the state announced that 1,247 of 1,781 deaths announced to that date, or 70 percent, were in nursing home or long-term care facilities. By May 26 there had been 33,006 reported cases, leading to 5,579 hospitalizations and 2,002 deaths. 1,450 of the hospitalizations were ICU admissions.

By May 21, in Ohio prisons more than 4,500 inmates had tested positive, with four prison worker and 63 inmate deaths. Mass-testing in prisons had been stopped in late April.

==== June ====
In late June and early July, some counties in Ohio experienced a sharp increase in cases.

==== July ====
On July 4, 91 cases were reported as the result of a 56-year-old man who had attended a church service on June 14 when he was contagious.

On July 22, the City of Cleveland reported 70 new cases among its residents but no new deaths.

==== August ====
On August 6, Governor DeWine said that an infected man who attended a single church service caused an outbreak of 91 COVID-19 cases.

On August 21, Ohio State University issued 228 interim suspensions to students for violations of COVID-19 safety guidelines.

==== September ====
On September 1, Miami University announced plans for testing of all students. Many of the 27 cases reported among athletes had been traced to an off-campus gathering in early August. Between August 17 and September 3, about 704 Miami students had tested positive.

On September 3, Ohio State University reported 882 positive cases among students and 20 positive cases among employees. Off-campus students tested in the previous 24 hours had a 9.66 positivity rate, while on-campus students had a 5.7 percent positivity rate. Further suspensions may be issued for gatherings of ten or more people without masks or social distancing. The University of Dayton announced that the cumulative number of positive cases among on-campus students was 1,042, almost 10% of all students, and included 639 active cases.

On September 20, Ohio State reached 2,580 cumulative positive tests, surpassing the total cases at the Marion Correctional Institution, to become the largest outbreak in the state.

==== October ====
As of October 1, there have been 155,314 reported cases in Ohio, leading to 4,817 deaths. By October 12, there were 170,179 reported cases, leading to 5,005 deaths. By October 16, there were 177,991 reported cases leading to 5,054 deaths.

On October 22, 38 Ohio counties were on red alert for coronavirus spread. Cuyahoga, Clark and Hamilton County were on "watch" for declaration of a purple "public emergency" level, having met the criteria for one out of the two weeks required. By October 22, 190,430 cases were reported in Ohio since the beginning of the pandemic, leading to 5,161 deaths. By October 27, 202,740 cases were reported, leading to 5,239 deaths. On October 29, the number of new cases recorded in 24 hours topped 3,500 for the first time. 3,845 new cases were reported October 30.

On October 29, Ohio had 3,590 new cases in a 24-hour period. This was the first time the state surpassed 3,000 daily cases, and 25% higher than the record high on the previous Saturday. 43% of Ohio counties, and 78% of Ohio residents were coded "red" for high exposure and spread.

On October 31, the 7-day test positivity rate was 6.9%. Two restaurants in Cleveland were cited for violating health orders with large Halloween gatherings.

==== November ====
By November 2, 221,909 COVID-19 cases had been reported, leading to 5,340 deaths. On November 3, classes were canceled at Clyde High School in Clyde due to several positive cases. By November 4, 230,209 cases had been reported. Those cases have led to 5,428 deaths. The total number of cases surpassed 250,000 on November 8. 7,101 cases were reported on November 12, which was the highest number of cases recorded in a day since Ohio began recording. The record was again broken on November 13, when 8,071 new cases were recorded. By November 19, 326,615 cases had been reported, leading to 5,890 deaths. On November 20, 8,808 cases had been reported in 24 hours. The total number of cases surpassed 350,000 on November 22. On November 23, 11,885 new cases were reported and the number of total deaths caused by the virus surpassed 6,000. The number of deaths reported in 24 hours was 98 on November 24. On November 27, 17,065 new cases were reported for a two-day period after no report for Thanksgiving on November 26. As of November 28, 406,703 total cases had been reported.

==== December ====
By December 1, the number of total cases had increased to 430,093. By December 6, there were 475,024 total reported cases leading to 6,959 deaths. By December 7, the number of deaths surpassed 7,000. By December 8, the number of total cases reported was 510,018 while the total number of hospitalizations was 30,226. By December 10, a total of 7,298 people in Ohio had died from the virus. By December 12, a total of 553,461 cases had been reported leading to 31,803 hospitalizations and 7,477 deaths. The number of total cases surpassed 600,000 on December 18. On December 19, the total number of deaths surpassed 8,000. As of December 26, 664,668 total cases had been reported. By December 31, 700,380 cases had been reported.

=== 2021 ===
==== January ====
By January 3, 2021, the total number of deaths had increased to 9,076. By January 6, the number of total hospitalizations had increased to 40,104. By January 7, 753,068 total cases had been reported. By January 14, 807,293 cases had been reported, leading to 9,990 deaths. By January 15, the total number of deaths surpassed 10,000. The number of deaths surpassed 11,000 on January 28.

==== February ====
As of February 2, 902,736 total cases had been reported. By February 11, there were 12,577 deaths. By February 12, a total of 15,136 deaths had been reported. By February 13, 16,340 deaths had been reported. In February, the Ohio Department of Health reported that it was reconciling death totals, which caused a fluctuation in numbers over several days. By February 22, 955,378 cases had been reported since the pandemic began. By February 24, the number of deaths caused by the virus was 17,045. By February 26, there were 50,118 hospitalizations.

==== March ====
By March 22, 1,001,194 cases had been reported since the pandemic began.

==== April ====
On April 5, it was reported that there had been 18,643 deaths in the state since the beginning of the pandemic.

==== May ====
By May 19, there were 1,093,534 reported cases and 19,628 deaths. On May 27, the number of total cases surpassed 1,100,000.

==== June ====
On June 5, Governor DeWine announced that the state had fewer than 50 per 100,000 COVID-19 cases in the previous two weeks, subtracting those in jails and prisons. This was the rate previously announced for removal of health orders, which occurred June 2. On June 8, the state reported more than 20,000 Ohio residents had died from COVID-19.

==== July ====
As of July 22, a total of 1,120,120 cases had been reported.

==== August ====
As of August 1, a total of 1,130,134 cases had been reported leading to 61,939 hospitalizations. As of August 12, a total of 1,152,590 cases had been reported. As of August 20, a total of 1,175,340 cases has been reported. By August 27, the number of cases surpassed 1.2 million.

==== October ====
By October 19, Ohio had surpassed more than 1.5 million total reported cases.

==== November ====
As of November 4, there had been a total of 1,560,695 cases, leading to 80,615 hospitalizations. As of November 5, there had been 25,067 deaths.

==== December ====
On December 31, the state announced more than two million cases since the beginning of the pandemic.

=== 2022 ===
==== January ====
On January 25, a total of 2,520,112 COVID-19 cases had been reported in Ohio.

==== March ====
On March 10, Dr. Bruce Vanderhoff, director of the Ohio Department of Health, announced that daily reporting of COVID-19 data would end Monday, March 14. He said, "The situation is improving and our experience with COVID-19 is [shifting] from a pandemic to endemic state." The plan was to update most statistics on Thursdays.

=== Spread by age range ===
Ohio COVID-19 cases by age group
Age	Cases	Hospitalizations	Deaths	% fatal
80+	212,550	34,779	19,310	9.08
70–79	287,330	36,058	11,734	4.08
60–69	436,302	32,326	7,964	1.82
50–59	522,561	21,152	3,570	0.68
40–49	523,470	11,794	1,274	0.24
30–39	600,315	8,469	516	0.09
20–29	642,011	6,207	156	0.024
0–19	670,185	6,005	70	0.010
Total	3,899,106	156,812	44,594	1.14

Source: Ohio dashboard, January 9, 2025.
Note: all data is preliminary and subject to change as more information is reported

=== Spread by county ===
COVID-19 pandemic medical cases in Ohio by county
County (Note: County where individuals with a positive case was diagnosed. Location of original infection may vary.)	Cases (Note: Reported cases includes confirmed case. Actual case numbers are probably higher.) (Note: "–" denotes that no data is currently available for that county, not that the value is zero.)	Deaths	Recov. (Note: ODH is not providing recovered case numbers. Local health departments could be providing this information at their discretion.)	Pop.	Cases / 100k	Deaths / 100k	Ref.
88 / 88	3,899,106	44,594	–	11,799,448	33,045	377.9	Ref.
Adams	10,624	175	–	27,477	38,665	636.9	
Allen	39,197	549	–	102,206	38,351	537.2	
Ashland	17,376	252	–	52,447	33,131	480.5	
Ashtabula	30,679	508	–	97,574	31,412	520.6	
Athens	23,948	171	–	62,431	38,359	273.9	
Auglaize	16,507	214	–	46,422	35,559	461.0	
Belmont	21,466	363	–	66,497	32,281	545.9	
Brown	16,691	213	–	43,676	38,215	487.7	
Butler	135,078	1,331	–	390,357	34,604	341.0	
Carroll	7,194	142	–	26,721	26,922	531.4	
Champaign	12,189	173	–	38,714	31,485	446.9	
Clark	48,647	675	–	136,001	35,770	496.3	
Clermont	76,214	683	–	208,601	36,536	327.4	
Clinton	14,538	196	–	42,018	34,599	466.5	
Columbiana	33,835	549	–	101,877	33,212	538.9	
Coshocton	11,942	182	–	36,612	32,618	497.1	
Crawford	16,357	238	–	42,025	38,922	566.3	
Cuyahoga	406,762	4,419	–	1,264,817	32,160	349.4	
Darke	17,252	261	–	51,881	33,253	503.1	
Defiance	14,149	183	–	38,286	36,956	478.0	
Delaware	62,668	330	–	214,124	29,267	154.1	
Erie	28,885	315	–	75,662	38,197	416.5	
Fairfield	52,742	490		158,921	33,188	308.3	
Fayette	10,615	141	–	28,951	36,665	487.0	
Franklin	412,773	3,003	–	1,323,807	31,181	226.8	
Fulton	14,565	194	–	42,713	34,100	454.2	
Gallia	12,580	155	–	29,220	43,053	530.5	
Geauga	23,559	320	–	95,397	24,696	335.4	
Greene	56,299	589	–	167,966	33,518	350.7	
Guernsey	15,595	181	–	38,438	40,572	470.9	
Hamilton	274,230	2,399	–	830,639	33,014	288.8	
Hancock	24,568	326	–	74,920	32,792	435.	
Hardin	9,953	173	–	30,696	32,424	563.6	
Harrison	4,820	91	–	14,483	33,280	628.3	
Henry	8,932	118	–	27,662	32,290	426.6	
Highland	15,872	209	–	43,317	36,642	482.5	
Hocking	10,134	142	–	28,050	36,128	506.2	
Holmes	6,473	202	–	44,223	14,637	456.8	
Huron	19,563	241	–	58,565	33,404	411.5	
Jackson	14,299	158	–	32,653	43,791	483.9	
Jefferson	21,514	372	–	65,249	32,972	570.1	
Knox	19,304	265	–	62,721	30,778	422.5	
Lake	71,020	880	–	232,603	30,533	378.2	
Lawrence	29,849	301	–	58,240	51,252	516.8	
Licking	60,232	557	–	178,519	33,740	312.0	
Logan	14,267	194	–	46,150	30,914	420.4	
Lorain	106,410	1,155	–	312,964	34,001	369.1	
Lucas	141,374	1,594	–	431,279	32,780	369.6	
Madison	12,888	155	–	43,824	29,409	353.7	
Mahoning	78,143	1,277	–	228,614	34,181	558.6	
Marion	28,143	296	–	65,359	43,059	452.9	
Medina	58,313	572	–	182,470	31,958	313.5	
Meigs	7,988	114	–	22,210	35,966	513.3	
Mercer	12,909	156	–	42,528	30,354	366.8	
Miami	36,142	552	–	108,774	33,227	507.5	
Monroe	5,011	91	–	13,385	37,437	679.9	
Montgomery	188,317	2,374	–	537,309	35,048	441.8	
Morgan	4,931	70	–	13,802	35,727	507.2	
Morrow	10,768	122	–	34,950	30,810	349.1	
Muskingum	35,854	352	–	86,410	41,493	407.4	
Noble	4,492	65	–	14,115	31,824	460.5	
Ottawa	12,279	163	–	40,364	30,421	403.8	
Paulding	6,289	84	–	18,806	33,441	446.7	
Perry	11,723	145	–	35,408	33,108	409.5	
Pickaway	24,388	254	–	58,539	41,661	433.9	
Pike	12,153	146	–	27,088	44,865	539.0	
Portage	50,331	518	–	161,791	31,109	320.2	
Preble	13,457	217	–	40,999	32,823	529.3	
Putnam	11,295	177	–	34,451	32,786	513.8	
Richland	45,244	589	–	124,936	36,214	471.4	
Ross	30,215	353	–	77,093	39,193	457.9	
Sandusky	20,260	280	–	58,518	34,400	475.4	
Scioto	33,969	296	–	74,008	45,899	400.0	
Seneca	17,975	261	–	55,069	32,641	474.0	
Shelby	14,168	230	–	48,230	29,376	476.9	
Stark	110,568	1,917	–	374,853	29,496	511.4	
Summit	162,846	1,993	–	540,428	30,133	368.8	
Trumbull	60,019	1,089	–	201,977	29,716	539.2	
Tuscarawas	28,951	566	–	93,263	31,042	606.9	
Union	22,693	126	–	62,784	36,145	200.7	
Van Wert	9,450	170	–	28,931	32,634	587.6	
Vinton	4,370	62	–	12,800	34,141	484.4	
Warren	83,476	680	–	242,337	34,446	280.6	
Washington	18,319	273	–	59,771	30,649	456.7	
Wayne	32,362	505	–	116,894	27,685	432.0	
Williams	14,082	180	–	37,102	37,955	485.1	
Wood	43,001	430	–	132,248	32,515	325.1	
Wyandot	7,634	116	–	21,900	34,858	529.7	
Updated January 9, 2025, 2 pm Data is publicly reported by Ohio Department of Health

Coronavirus cases per 100,000 residents on January 9, 2025 >40,000 per 100,000 32,000 to 39,999 per 100,000 28,000 to 31,999 per 100,000 24,000 to 27,999 per 100,000 20,000 to 23,999 per 100,000 16,000 to 19,999 per 100,000 14,000 to 15,999 per 100,000 12,000 to 13,999 per 100,000 10,000 to 11,999 per 100,000

Coronavirus cases by county in Ohio on January 9, 2025 >100,000 confirmed cases 10,000 - 99,999 confirmed cases 1,000-9,999 confirmed cases 100-999 confirmed cases

Coronavirus deaths per 100,000 residents on January 9, 2025 >500 per 100,000 400 to 499.9 per 100,000 320 to 399.9 per 100,000 240 to 319.9 per 100,000 160 to 239.9 per 100,000 80 to 159.9 per 100,000

=== Graphs of statistics by date from the Ohio Department of Health ===
==== Cases by date ====
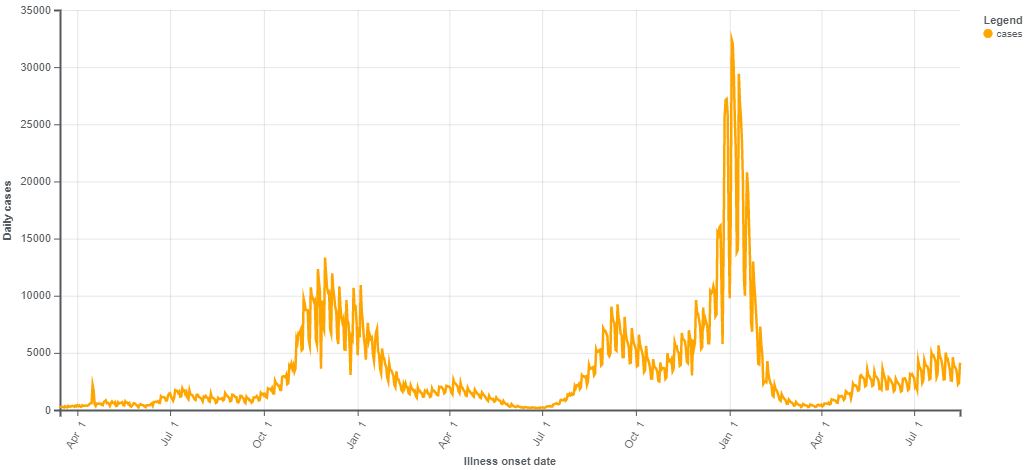
Onset date for disease. Values for most recent days are provisional. Updated August 25, 2022 If onset date unknown, earliest known date associated with case is used. Source: Ohio coronavirus dashboard

==== Deaths by date ====
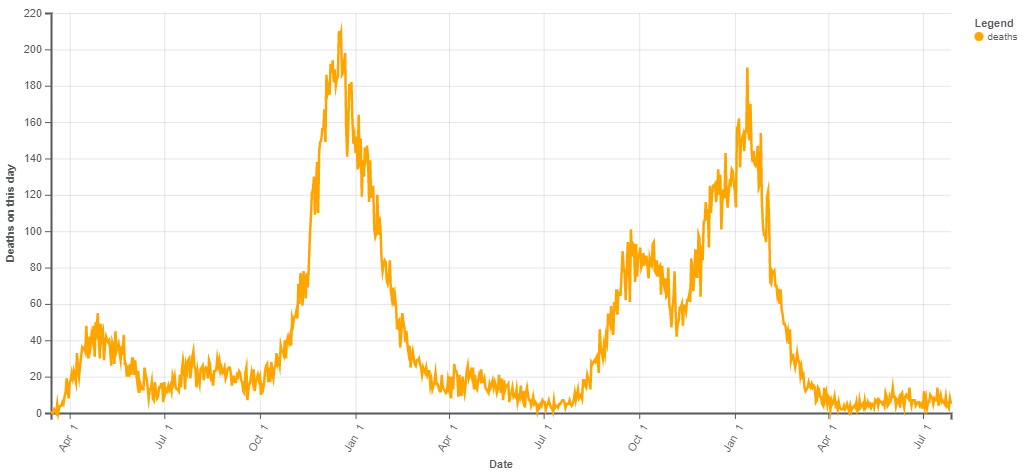
Number of people who died on each date. Updated August 11, 2022 Source: Ohio coronavirus dashboard Note: data for most recent several days is preliminary.

==== Hospital admissions by date ====
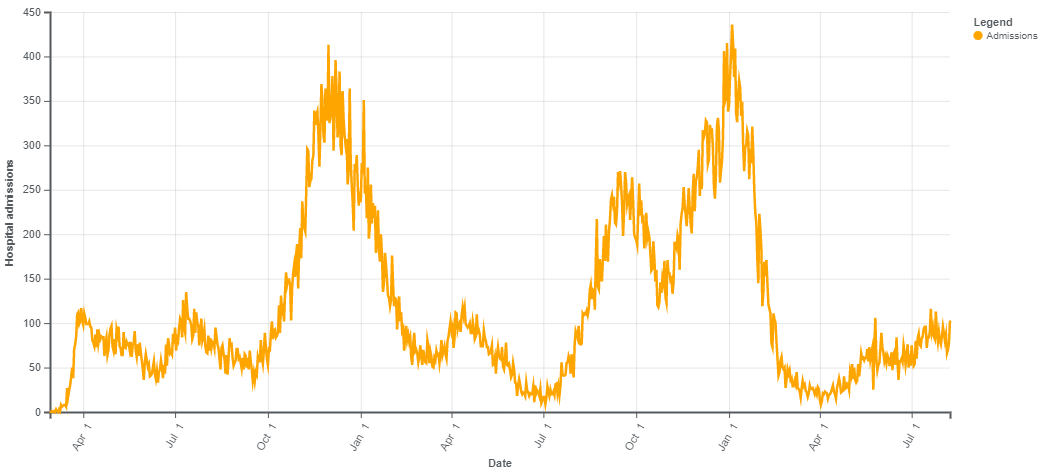
Number of people admitted to hospital on each date. Values for most recent days are provisional. Source: Ohio coronavirus dashboard. Updated August 18, 2022 Excludes admissions where date is not yet known.

==== Diagnostic tests by date ====
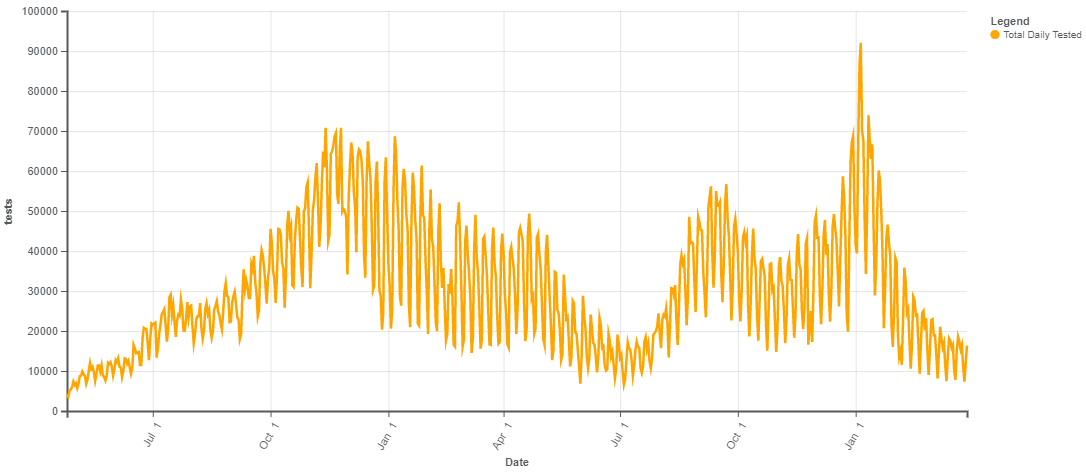
Number of diagnostic tests for COVID-19 performed on each date. data is presented by result date. Updated March 29, 2022 ... Final report from state ... No further data anticipated source: Confirmatory Laboratory Tests – This includes PCR and molecular detection of genetic material specific to the virus that causes COVID-19.

==== Percent test positivity by date ====
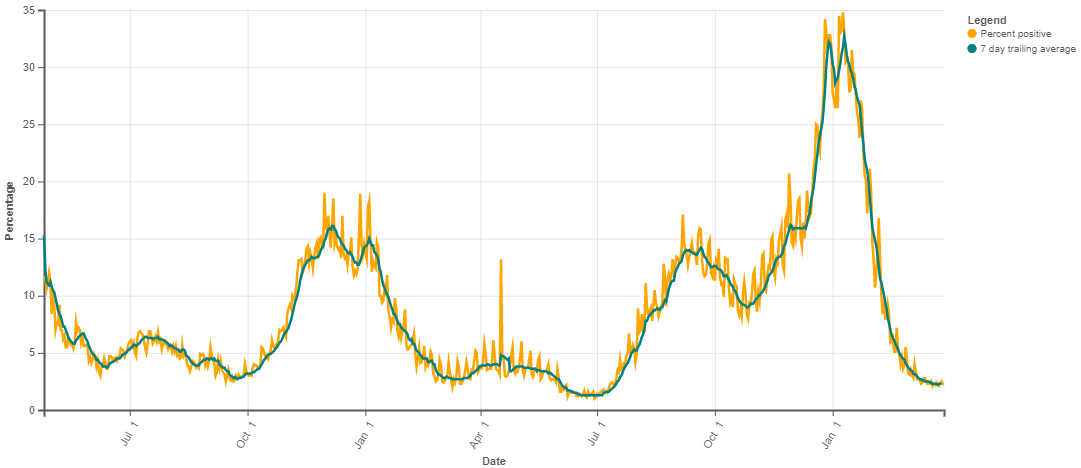
Daily percentage of positive tests for COVID-19 performed on each date and seven day trailing average for each date. data is presented by result date. Updated March 29, 2022 ... Final report from state ... No further data anticipated source: Confirmatory Laboratory Tests – This includes PCR and molecular detection of genetic material specific to the virus that causes COVID-19.

== Government response ==
Acting on advice from Ohio Department of Health Director Amy Acton, Governor DeWine was one of the first state governors to take an interest in COVID mitigation measures, before the state had any confirmed cases, and established several policies which other states would follow after. The Hill said he'd "been one of the most aggressive governors in responding to the pandemic".

Prior to the state having any confirmed cases, on March 3, DeWine made the decision to cancel the Arnold Classic, a move which The Washington Post noted as seeming "radical" at the time. The estimated economic impact for the state was $53 million.

On March 5, when the state still had no confirmed cases, DeWine and Acton held a summit on COVID-19 preparedness for public health officials in the state.

DeWine declared a state of emergency on March 9, when the state had only three known cases. That same day he asked colleges and universities to go to online classes. Within days many colleges and universities had taken steps to comply.

On March 12, DeWine announced that all schools from K-12 would close for a 3-week break, starting March 16; he was the first governor to announce statewide school closings. The Ohio Department of Education updated their guidelines for ensuring schoolchildren received meals, announcing that each district would make independent decisions about providing reduced and free breakfast and lunch to students during the break but encouraging districts to ensure needs were met and stating the department would continue to reimburse districts for meals served during the closure.

Also on March 12, Ohio Department of Health director Amy Acton instituted a ban on gatherings of more than 100, with exemptions for airports, workplaces, restaurants, religious gatherings, weddings and funerals. Despite having only thirteen confirmed cases at the time, Ohio officials were predicting that there were over 100,000 cases in the state. Acton compared the small number of cases to "seeing a star and knowing that light is a moment from the deep past" as she argued for Ohioans to take steps to prevent further infections that could overload the state's hospitals.

DeWine and Acton on March 14 recommended Ohioans postpone elective surgeries.

DeWine and Acton ordered the closure of all bars and restaurants starting 9:00 pm EDT March 15, 2020, saying the government "encouraged restaurants to offer carryout or delivery service" but that they "would not be allowed to have people congregating in the businesses." DeWine said he was "concerned that with St. Patrick's Day coming up Tuesday, people would ignore warnings and go out to bars." Closing of the state's estimated 22,000 restaurants was expected to affect some 500,000 workers. DeWine instituted a liquor buyback program and expanded Ohio's unemployment insurance to cover laid-off restaurant workers. The state waived the qualifying waiting period as well as the requirement that individuals receiving jobless benefits must seek new employment. The action also was extended to workers who are under quarantine or those who work in health care. DeWine announced his intention to close daycares and recommended parents remove their children from daycare if possible.

On March 16, DeWine banned gatherings of more than 50 people and on March 17 he ordered that all elective surgeries be postponed; controversially, the state government indicated that this included abortions. On March 18, DeWine announced that 181 BMV locations would close until further notice. Five would stay open to process commercial driver license applications and renewal. DeWine asked the state legislature to pass a grace period for people whose licenses expired. Barbershops, salons, and tattoo parlors closed. Businesses that stayed open had to take every employee's temperature every day before they start work and send anyone with a temperature over 100.4F home; DeWine warned that if businesses did not comply, he would close all nonessential businesses. Mayor Andrew Ginther declared a state of emergency in Columbus, Ohio.

On March 19 Governor DeWine signed state active duty proclamation that will activate 300 personnel from the Ohio National Guard, as well as a contingent of Ohio Military Reserve personnel, to help with humanitarian efforts. On March 20 DeWine ordered senior citizens centers to close by March 23. The next day he closed adult day services serving more than ten people at a time, saying he had delayed closing them until ensuring provision had been made to care for those served in them.

On March 22, Acton issued a statewide stay-at-home order to take effect from midnight on March 23 through April 6, requiring the closure of nonessential businesses. DeWine ordered most childcare facilities to close beginning March 26. The State of Ohio Board of Pharmacy approved restrictions on the dispensing of chloroquine and hydroxychloroquine to treat COVID-19.

DeWine said that because of the economic fallout from the closures, the state would need to slow down the rate of spending...rather dramatically," announcing on March 23 a hiring freeze for the state, a freeze on new contract services, and a continuation of the freeze on state employee travel. He asked cabinet members to find budget cuts of 20%. According to Lieutenant Governor Jon Husted, Ohio would at the request of the Trump administration desist from publicizing unemployment figures.

On March 24 Jim Bridenstine announced that a number of NASA facilities would be moved to stage 4 where non-critical infrastructure is closed, including the Glenn Research Center in Cleveland, and the Plum Brook Station near Sandusky.

Acton on March 24 estimated that Ohio was 7 to 14 days behind New York state, which at the time was overwhelmed. On March 26 Acton announced that 17, 316 Ohioans had been tested. On March 27 Acton said the state was at that time expecting cases to peak in mid-May at 10,000 new cases per day.

On March 25, the Ohio General Assembly passed House Bill 197, which extended primary voting to April 28, banned water utilities from disconnecting service, and waived standardized testing for public schools.

On March 28, DeWine asked the FDA to issue an emergency waiver for the use of new technology that can sterilize face masks.

On April 2, Governor DeWine announced during his daily press conference that there was a new method to divide the state into hospital capacity regions.

On April 3, DeWine extended Ohio's stay at home order through May 1 with new restrictions: campgrounds would close, all retail businesses had to post signs limiting how many are allowed in at one time, and wedding receptions were limited to 10 people. The order also established a state board to evaluate what is and is not an essential business.

On April 4 Ohio recommended the wearing of cloth face masks when leaving home as a way to protect others. DeWine signed an executive order removing training requirements for mental health and marriage counselors to make telehealth visits more easily accessible.

On April 6 DeWine named six facilities that will be converted into health care facilities if necessary: the Dayton Convention Center, the Duke Energy Center in Cincinnati, the Greater Columbus Convention Center, Seagate Convention Center in Toledo, Case Western Reserve University's Health Education Campus in Cleveland, and the Covelli Convention Center in Youngstown. Also on April 6, Ohio House Speaker Larry Householder named 24 lawmakers to a task force dedicated to studying how the House can speed up economic recovery.

On April 9 the Ohio Department of Health released a video demonstrating the effect of social distancing that went viral.

On April 15, DeWine announced that he had asked the Ohio Hospital Association to begin developing a plan to start treating people whose non-COVID-19 elective procedures were deferred or delayed. DeWine also announced that Ohio's partnership with the Battelle Memorial Institute was expanding. This will allow the institute to extend its sterilization services to EMS providers and law enforcement agencies. On April 16 DeWine announced that he would work closely with the Governors of Illinois, Indiana, Kentucky, Michigan, Minnesota, and Wisconsin to reopen the region's economy in a coordinated way.

The Ohio Department of Health established a tier system to prioritize testing on April 22. Ohio: DeWine shares additional details on how the state will re-open. Phase one of the re-opening will begin on May 1.

On April 20, Governor DeWine announced that Ohio's K-12 schools would remain closed for the remainder of the academic year.

On April 30 DeWine and Acton amended the stay-at-home order and extended it to May 29, calling it the "Stay Safe Order." Some businesses were allowed to open on a limited basis, including dentists and veterinarians on May 1, manufacturing, distribution, construction, and general offices on May 4, with remote work if possible, and retail businesses on May 12 with employees and customers wearing masks.

On May 19 Governor DeWine announced an "Urgent Health Advisory: Ohioans protecting Ohioans" order. Elements of the previous stay-at-home order became "strong recommendations." The following day DeWine announced that three new orders had been signed. One order partially rescinds the April 30 Stay Safe Ohio Order, one issue a series of health advisories, and the Camp Safe Ohio Order specifies how campgrounds in Ohio can reopen.

On June 18, DeWine expressed concern about a spike in cases in southwestern Ohio and suggested that people in 13 specific zip codes (within 5 counties: Hamilton, Montgomery, Greene, Warren, and Clark) should get tested. He said National Guard units would be in the area to provide help with the testing.

On July 2, a four-level system was introduced for classifying the severity of outbreaks in individual counties. The system was based on seven metrics, including new cases and cases per-capita, cases in "non-congregate" environments, ICU bed occupancy, and sustained increases in hospital admissions. These classifications were updated on Wednesdays; as of its introduction, seven counties (Butler, Cuyahoga, Franklin, Hamilton, Huron, Montgomery, and Trumbull counties) were listed in alert level 3, while Franklin County was marked as being at risk of entering alert level 4 — meaning that at least six of the metrics were showing signs of concern.

On July 8, DeWine announced that the wearing of face coverings in public would become mandatory in any county that is under alert level 3 or higher. This order applied in any enclosed public spaces, outdoors when social distancing was not possible, or when using public or private transport services. On July 22, DeWine announced that this mask mandate would be extended statewide beginning July 23 at 6:00 p.m.

In October, DeWine announced the formation of COVID-19 defense teams to fight the pandemic in each county. The teams are made of those in the medical field, mayors, religious leaders, and businesses. On November 11, DeWine announced additions to the mask mandate, which included requiring businesses to post face covering requirement signs at all public entrances. A new order pertaining to public gatherings prohibited dancing and games and required people to be seated and wear masks while eating. On November 16, DeWine announced that he opposed a second shutdown, instead favoring a "slow down." "We don't want to shut this state down," said DeWine. "That has ramifications for mental health, it has ramifications for more drug addiction, overdoses. I mean, all these things go up when you shut the state down. And we do not want to do that." A formal announcement on the slowdown was on Tuesday, November 17. In the announcement, DeWine gave information on a new curfew, requiring retail businesses to close between 10:00 pm and 5:00 am. During these hours, people in Ohio are supposed to stay at home, with certain exceptions, such as seeking medical treatment and going to work. The curfew began on November 19 and was set to last for 21 days. On December 7, DeWine announced that the curfew would be extended. On December 10, Governor DeWine extended the curfew until January 2. Also on December 10, DeWine unveiled the Stay Safe Ohio protocol for the holiday season. On December 30, DeWine announced that he would extend the curfew until January 23. He also announced that schools would be allowed to resume full in-person learning on March 1. Students were required to wear masks and social distance. On January 22, DeWine announced that he would extend the curfew until January 30. In early April, health orders were consolidated. Mass gatherings were permitted, so long as people stayed in groups of 10 or less. On April 27, Governor DeWine announced that those who are fully vaccinated will not have to quarantine if exposed to a person with COVID.

=== Reopenings ===
On April 14 DeWine said he couldn't imagine any businesses reopening without employees wearing masks. DeWine announced April 16 that some reopenings would start on May 1. On April 16, Trump announced that states could restart their economies when they had 14 days of declining cases.

On April 27, the governor announced Phase 1 of the state's reopening plan. The businesses allowed to reopen would be on this schedule:

- Friday, May 1: Hospital, medical, dental, and veterinary services that don't require an overnight hospital stay.
- Monday, May 4: Construction, distribution, manufacturing, and general offices
- Tuesday, May 12: Consumer, retail, and service businesses

The plan also listed those types of businesses that would not reopen, and a list of rules and guidelines, including mandatory face coverings worn at all times. DeWine later reversed the order requiring people to wear face masks in businesses, saying that it "went too far."

On May 7, DeWine announced that on Friday, May 15, barbershops and salons may re-open. Also on May 15, patio service can resume at bars and restaurants. Parties at restaurants and bars must have 10 people or less and must be separated by a physical barrier or six feet of space. Restaurants and bars can resume dine-in services on May 21.

On May 14, DeWine and Acton announced more re-opening dates. Campgrounds opened on May 21, horse racing opened on May 22, the Ohio Bureau of Motor Vehicles (BMV), gyms, fitness centers, pools, and sports leagues (only for sports involving limited or no contact) opened on May 26, and childcare centers opened on May 31. Personal services such as salons, spas, massage therapy, tattoo services, and piercing services opened on May 15. Starting June 8, assisted living facilities and intermediate care facilities for people with developmental disabilities allowed outside visitation. On June 5 DeWine announced that entertainment facilities such as movie theaters and zoos could re-open in one week and that casinos, racinos, amusement parks, water parks, and outdoor theaters could reopen in two weeks. DeWine's office approved a safety plan which will allow the Memorial Tournament to be held from July 13–19. Practice for contact sports could begin on June 22. DeWine announced on June 30 that nursing homes would be open for outdoor visitation starting July 20. On July 2 DeWine released guidelines for schools to follow as they re-open. In August, the Ohio Department of Health Director introduced a mask mandate for students in K-12 schools. In the fall of 2020, school sports are allowed, but with limited spectators. On September 23, DeWine issued an order allowing restaurants to fully open but with restrictions. Relaxed visitations at nursing homes and assisted living facilities will be allowed starting October 12.

On January 26, 2021, Governor DeWine announced the criteria for lifting the 10 p.m. curfew. On January 27, DeWine announced that, starting January 28, the stateside curfew would start at 11 p.m. On February 11, the curfew was lifted. On May 12, DeWine announced that all COVID health orders, including the mask mandate, would be lifted on June 2. On May 14, DeWine announced that the remaining health orders would be updated to reflect changes in the CDC's guidelines. Starting May 17, an amended health order allowed fully vaccinated people to not wear masks. On June 1, Ohio Department of Health Director Stephanie McCloud signed an order rescinding several COVID-19-related health orders, including mask mandates. The rescissions went into effect on June 2.

=== Effectiveness of government response ===
On March 26 Acton said that the measures implemented in Ohio had decreased the impact on the state's healthcare system by 50 to 75%. On March 27, Acton projected Ohio cases to peak in mid-May at 10,000 per day. By the first week in April, crediting Ohioan's compliance with social distancing requests, she had revised the projection to mid-to-late April or early May. On April 8, Acton said that the effectiveness of physical distancing being incorporated into modeling led to a revised projection of a new peak of 1,600 new cases per day in late April.

The Washington Post on April 9 praised Ohio's government response. The state had fewer than 1/3 as many cases and fewer deaths than Illinois, Pennsylvania, and Michigan, all nearby comparably sized states.

On October 24, President Trump held a campaign rally at the Pickaway County Fairgrounds in Circleville. "The seats were just inches apart in rows spaced less than 3 feet apart. The many more standees were packed closely together. The use of face masks was sporadic at best." President Trump told the crowd, "It's going away, it's rounding the turn." However, according to WBNS-TV in Columbus, "cases, hospitalizations and ICU admissions ... [had] increased in recent weeks."

=== Criticism of government response ===
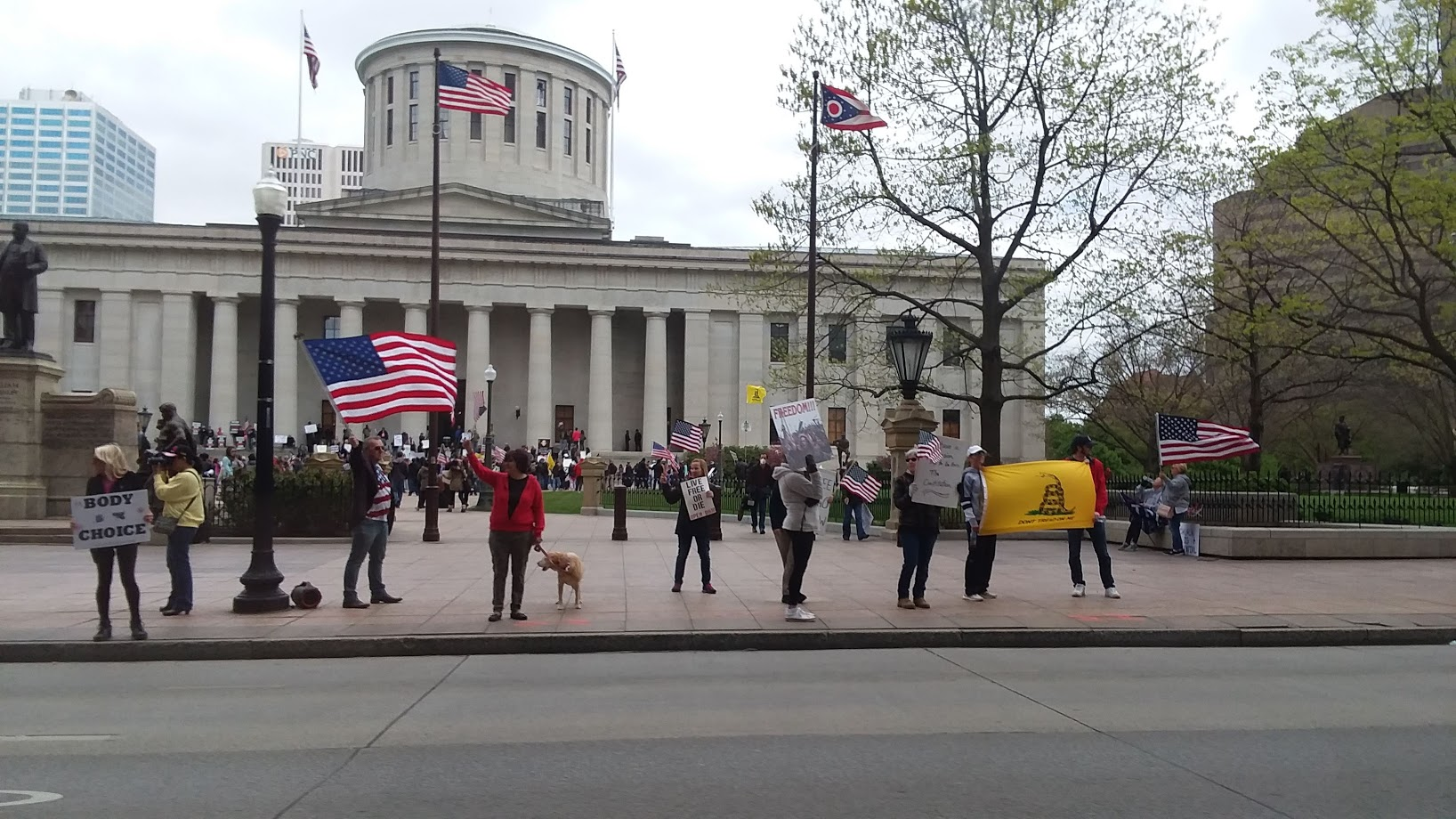
Protesters in front of the Ohio Statehouse on May 1, 2020

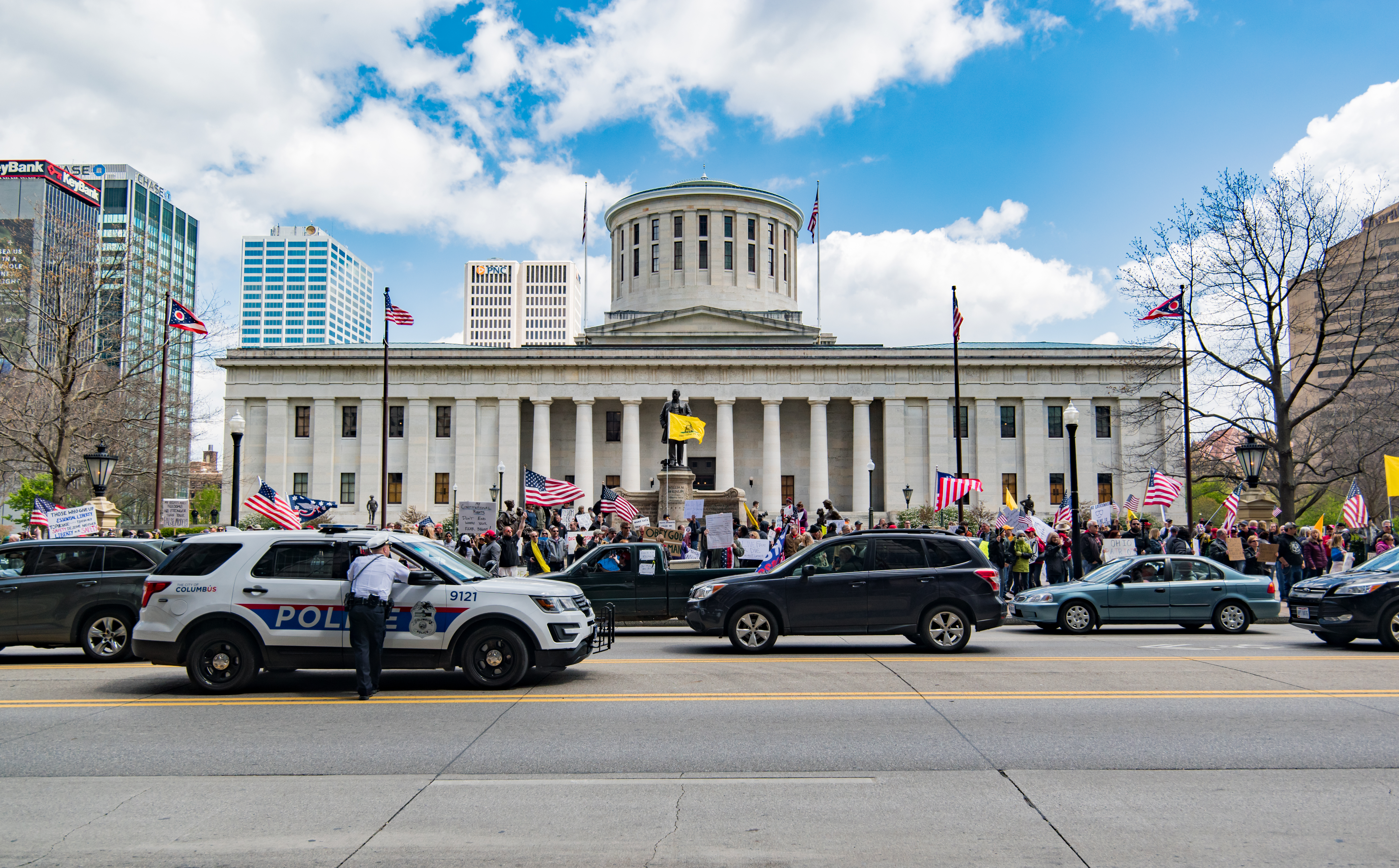
Protesting the shutdown and business closures at the Ohio Statehouse on April 18

While multiple media outlets praised DeWine and Acton's orders, a group of 75 protested the restrictions on nonessential workers outside the Statehouse during their April 9 press conference. Another protest was staged April 13. On April 14, 100 protesters gathered at the Statehouse during DeWine's press conference.

On April 18 several hundred protesters again assembled at the Statehouse. Two men at the protest had a sign with anti-semitic imagery, showing a rat wearing a yarmulke and a Star of David with the caption, "The real plague." Protests continued on April 20 with hundreds gathering outside the Statehouse. On May 1, another large protest occurred during DeWine's press conference. Protests at the statehouse continued the next day.

On April 16, 2020, a Columbus bridal shop owner, represented by the 1851 Center for Constitutional Law, sued Acton for violating the shop owner's constitutional rights and asking that the court for a temporary restraining order on the government's classification of businesses as non-essential.

In late April, 32 Ohio state representative Republicans called for DeWine to reopen the state's economy completely on May 1. In August, several Republicans filed an impeachment resolution that alleges that Dewine: gave Ohio's health department overly broad leeway to issue COVID-19 guidelines; "conspired" with the Ohio secretary of state to delay the March primary; and forced businesses to close, leading to a major economic slowdown. On September 28, Representative John Becker filed to have criminal charges brought against DeWine for his response to COVID-19. The criminal charges include engaging in a pattern of corrupt activity, complicity, terrorism, making terroristic threats, inducing panic, conspiracy, bribery, interfering with civil rights, coercion, and patient abuse or neglect.

On September 8, attendees at a Women for Trump event in Westerville featuring South Dakota Governor Christie Noem criticized Ohio Governor DeWine's handling of the pandemic. Noem, whose state had a 22% positivity rate, "described how she disdained a push by state health officials to require masks, limit business activities and take other actions to halt the spread of COVID-19." The Ohio Democratic Party questioned whether Noem had followed "the guidance of Mike DeWine's health department" requiring self-quarantine for 14 days for visitors from states with high positivity.

On September 21, at a Trump campaign rally in Swanton, Lieutenant Governor Jon Husted urged rally attendees to wear masks and was booed by the crowd. Governor DeWine was received with a mixture of cheers and boos. President Trump's speech, which dismissed the effects of the disease on young people, prompted criticism of the President's rhetoric on the virus.

=== Primary elections ===
Ohio's 2020 primary elections were scheduled to be held Tuesday, March 17. DeWine, Acton, and Secretary of State Frank LaRose held an afternoon press conference on Monday, March 16 to cover precautions being taken for the next day's primary election. LaRose issued an order to county boards of election allowing curbside voting.

DeWine recommended pushing the primaries into June but did not think he had the authority to change the date. DeWine and LaRose sought a court order to close down the elections, having former Ohio Department of Aging Director Judith Brachman file a suit in the Franklin County Court of Common Pleas to delay the election, but Judge Richard A. Frye denied it, saying it would set a "terrible precedent" and would represent a judge rewriting election code hours before an election.

Acton eventually announced at 10:08 pm that polls would be closed as a "health emergency." DeWine announced that LaRose would "seek a remedy through the courts to extend voting options so that every voter who wants to vote will be granted that opportunity."

Acting on behalf of a candidate for a Wood County Common Pleas judgeship, Corey Spiewak, Perrysburg attorney Andy Mayle filed a suit in the Ohio Supreme Court to overturn Acton's action. The court ordered the state to respond to the suit by 1:30 am Tuesday. Ohio Attorney General Dave Yost and Solicitor General Benjamin M. Flowers filed an answer on behalf of LaRose. A decision denying the writ was issued by four justices. The three who did not participate in the decision were Judith French and Sharon Kennedy, both of whom were running for re-election, and Pat DeWine, who is the governor's son.

== Private sector response ==
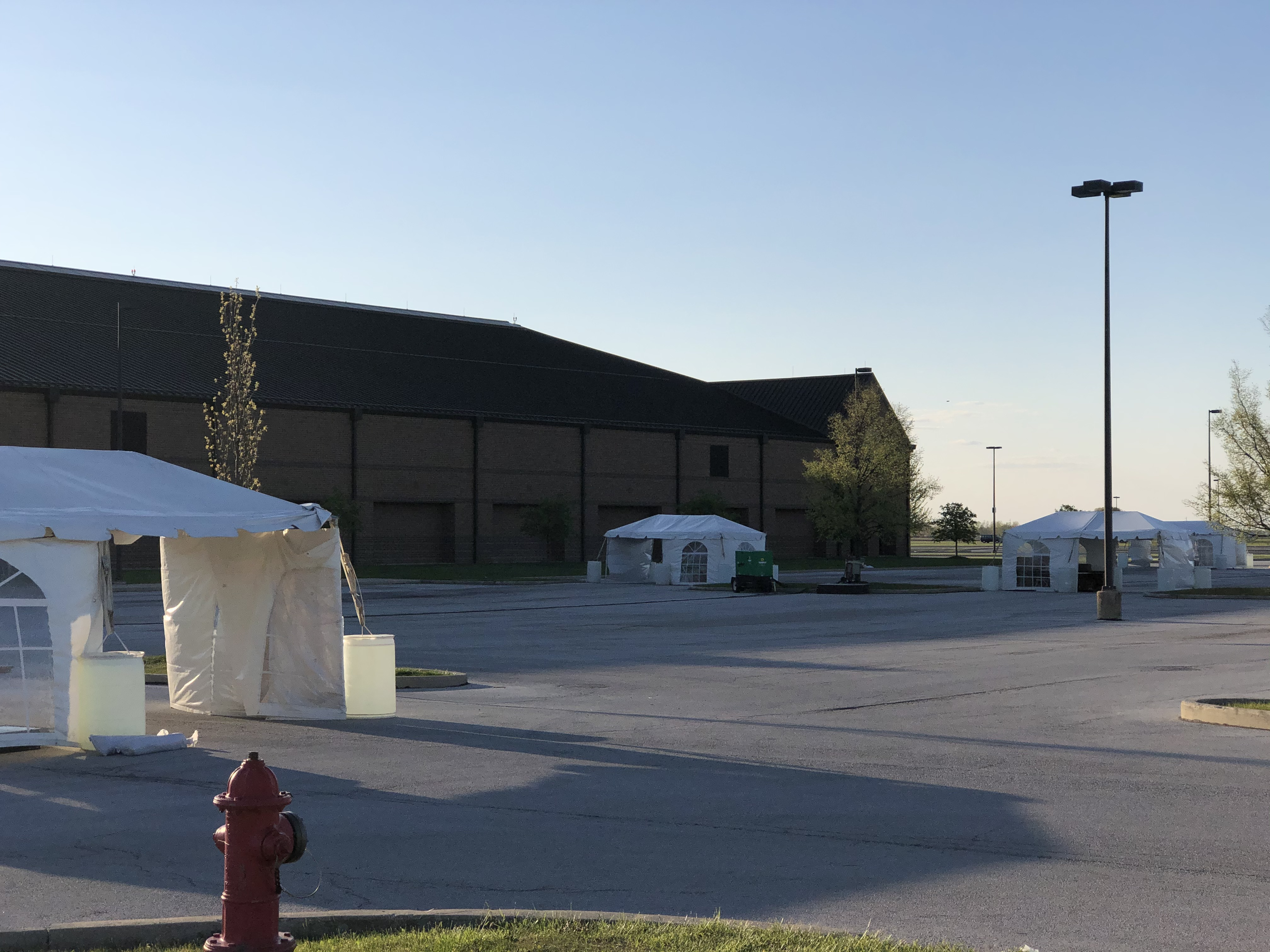
A temporary drive-thru testing site set up at Bowling Green State University

In late March Battelle Labs in Columbus developed a technology to sterilize N95 masks for reuse, intending to provide 160,000 masks per day in Ohio and to send sterilizing machines to other areas of the US. On March 29 the FDA approved the technology for limited use of up to 10,000 sterilizations per day. DeWine issued a press release condemning this decision that afternoon. Later on March 29, the FDA changed their position, and allowed full use of the technology.

Amish businesses switched to producing face masks and shields. Berlin Gardens in Millersburg, normally a maker of garden furniture, was producing 100,000 face shields per day by April 10.

Gojo Industries announced that it would prioritize hospitals and first responders for its Purell hand sanitizer.

On September 9, trials for a potential COVID-19 vaccine at the Ohio State University Wexner Medical Center were put on hold because a UK participant developed an unexplained illness. The vaccine, developed by the University of Oxford and pharmaceutical company AstraZeneca, was going into clinical trials for 30,000 participants worldwide, with 500 participants at the Ohio State location.

== Readiness ==
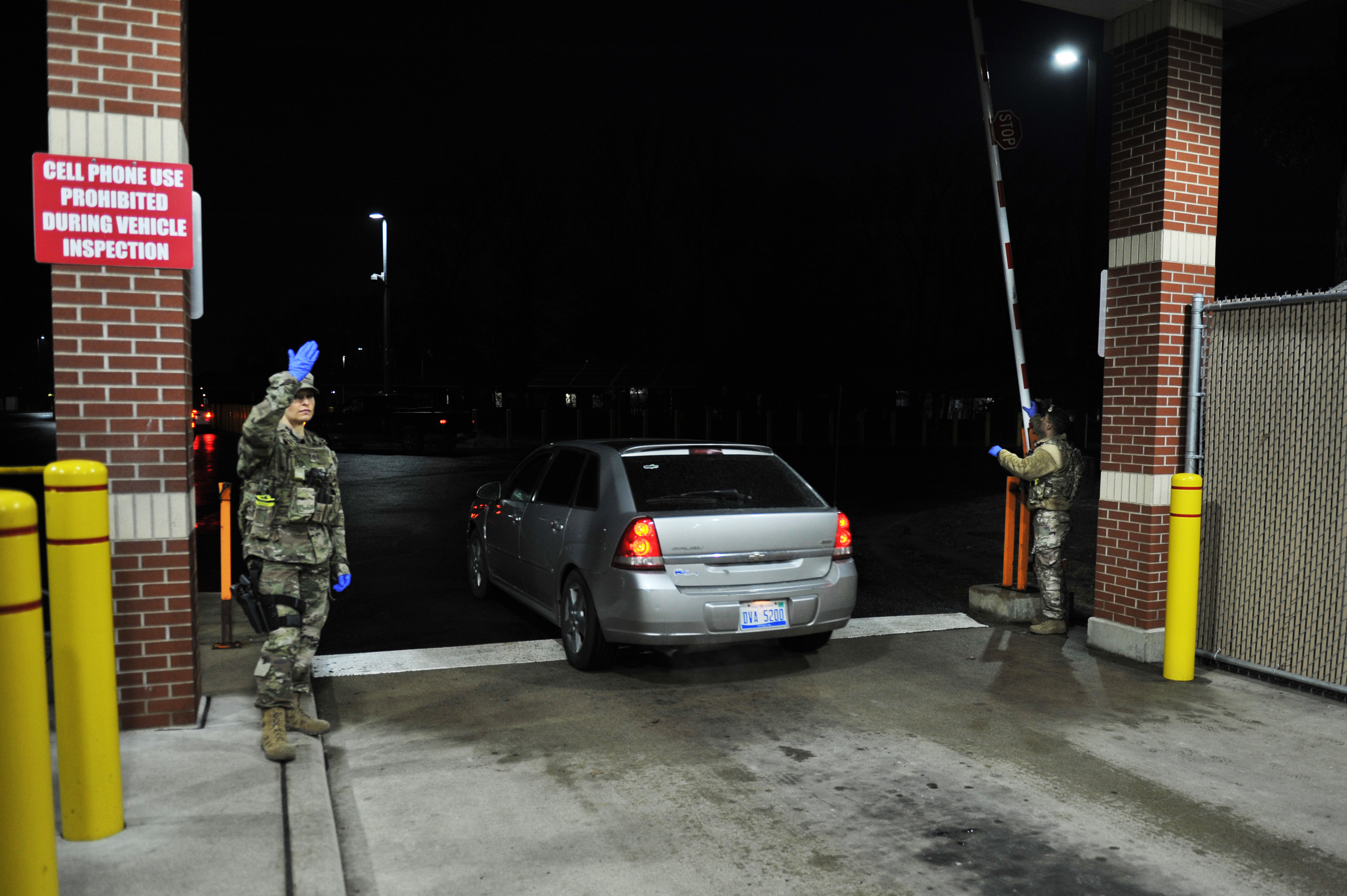
Members of the Ohio National Guard wearing protective gloves while monitoring incoming vehicles.

According to Acton, as of March 24 Ohio had 3600 ICU beds and would need to increase that capacity by 50%. In Ohio about 26% of patients require hospitalization and about 11% need intensive care. As of March 24, Ohio hospitals were at 60% of capacity. In southwest Ohio, hospital executives said they could increase capacity by 20% to 50%.

Acton said on March 24 that Ohio was converting anesthesia machines to respirators, considering which other buildings could be converted into makeshift hospitals, and determining how to safely reuse personal protective equipment such as masks.

On October 15, it was reported that regional outbreaks had strained the hospital system in Lima.

== Impacts ==
The coronavirus pandemic affected abortion, employment, education, religion, the restaurant industry, sports, public transportation, and prisons in Ohio.

=== On abortion ===
On March 17, after Acton issued an order prohibiting nonessential surgeries to preserve personal protective equipment (PPE), DeWine said abortions should be included except when the pregnant woman's life is at risk. Deputy Attorney General Jonathan Fulkerson sent letters to three abortion providers to compel them to comply with the state ban on nonessential medical procedures. District Court Judge Michael Barrett ruled in favor of Planned Parenthood on April 1, ordering a two-week suspension of the ban. The State of Ohio appealed Barrett's decision and asked him to put a hold on his order until the appeal was decided, which he declined to do. State of Ohio Attorney General Dave Yost later clarified that all medical abortions were still allowed, and that "doctors remain free to perform surgical abortions necessary for a mother's health or life, and also surgical abortions that cannot be delayed without jeopardizing the patient's abortion rights." On April 6, the State's request for an appeal was dismissed by the United States Court of Appeals for the Sixth Circuit.

=== On education ===
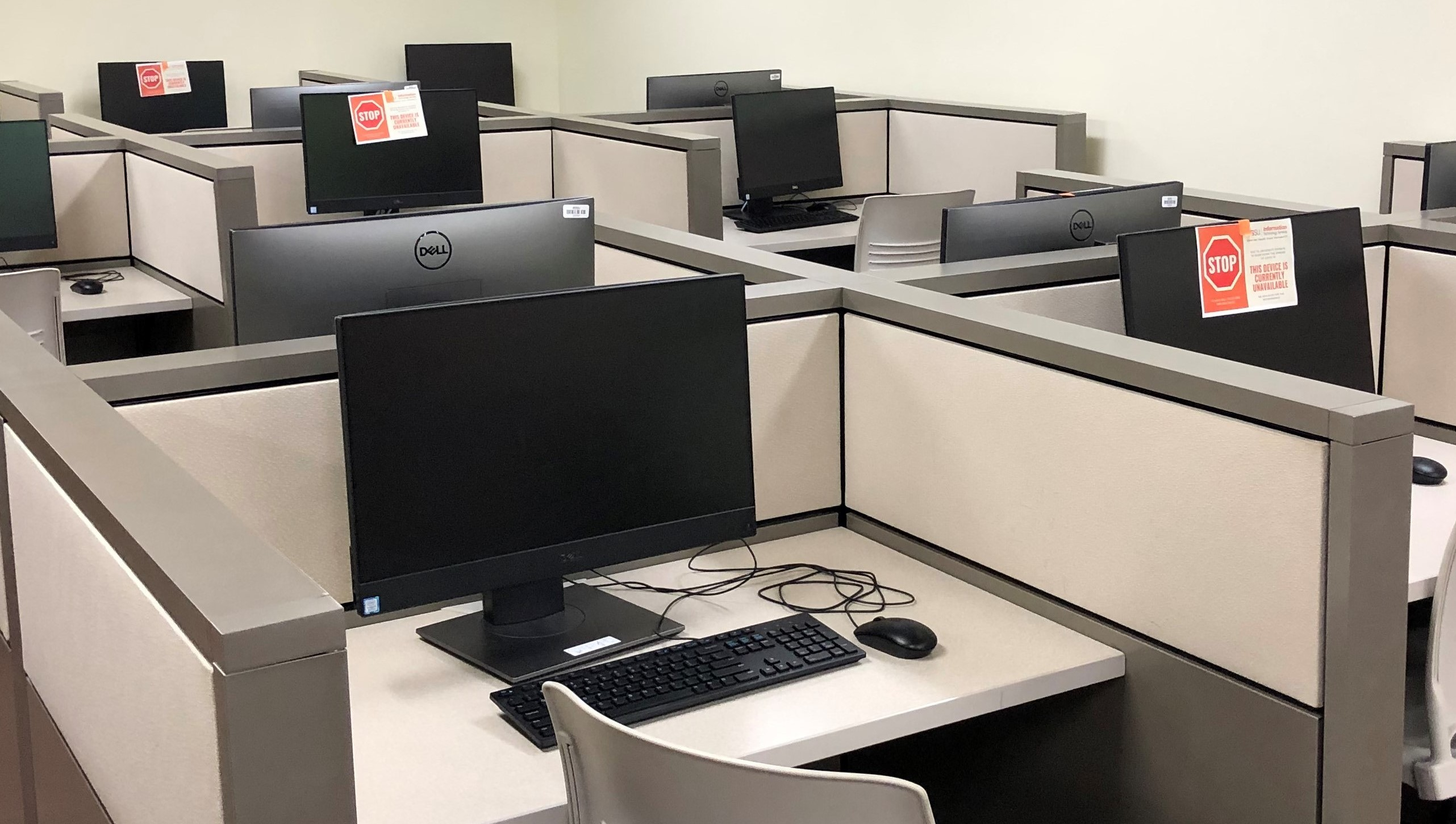
Social distancing measure taken in a university computer lab on March 13th.

On March 10 DeWine asked colleges and universities to go to remote classes. Within several days many private and public colleges and universities had announced campus closings and a move to online classes. On March 12 DeWine closed all K-12 schools starting March 16. On March 30 he extended those closings to May 1. On April 20, he ordered that all K-12 schools in the state remain closed for the rest of the 2019–2020 academic year On May 6, Governor DeWine announced a $775 million budget reduction over the next two months. Spending on K-12 schools would be reduced by $300 million. Spending on other education would be reduced by $55 million and higher education spending will be reduced by $110 million.

On December 30, DeWine announced that he would extend the curfew until January 23. He also announced that schools would be allowed to resume full in-person learning on March 1. Students will be required to wear masks and social distance. DeWine also announced new looser guidelines for schools. COVID-19-exposed student are no longer required to quarantine at home, unless masking and social distancing cannot be enforced.

=== On employment ===
NPR reported on March 24 that "Almost 140,000 people filed for unemployment benefits in Ohio last week compared with fewer than 5,000 a week earlier." On April 7, when asked about delays in the filing, Lieutenant Governor Husted said over 500 additional employees had been hired to process applications, bringing the number of employees of Ohio Department of Jobs and Family Services to 829 employees.

=== On prisons ===
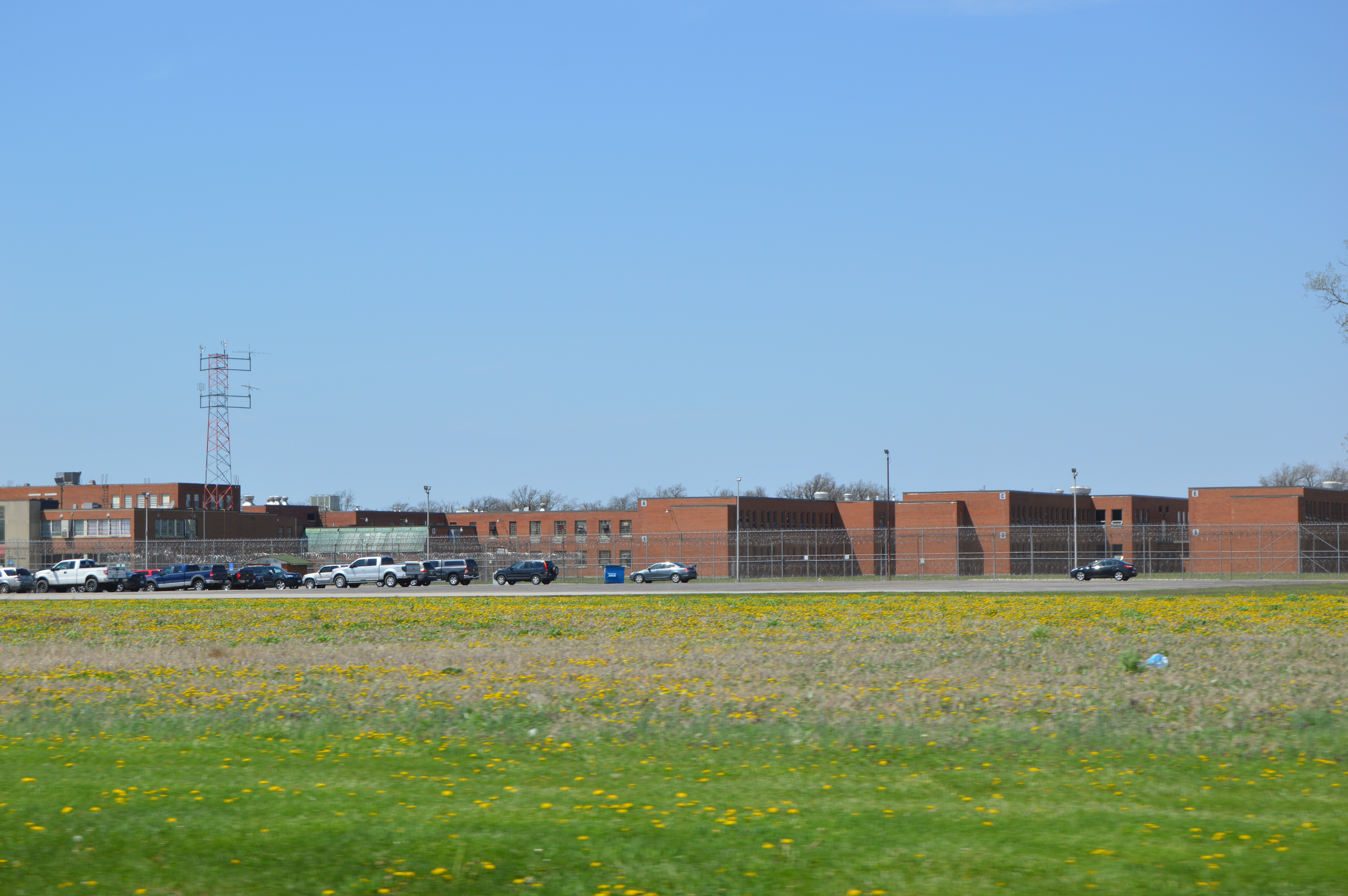
Marion Correctional Institution

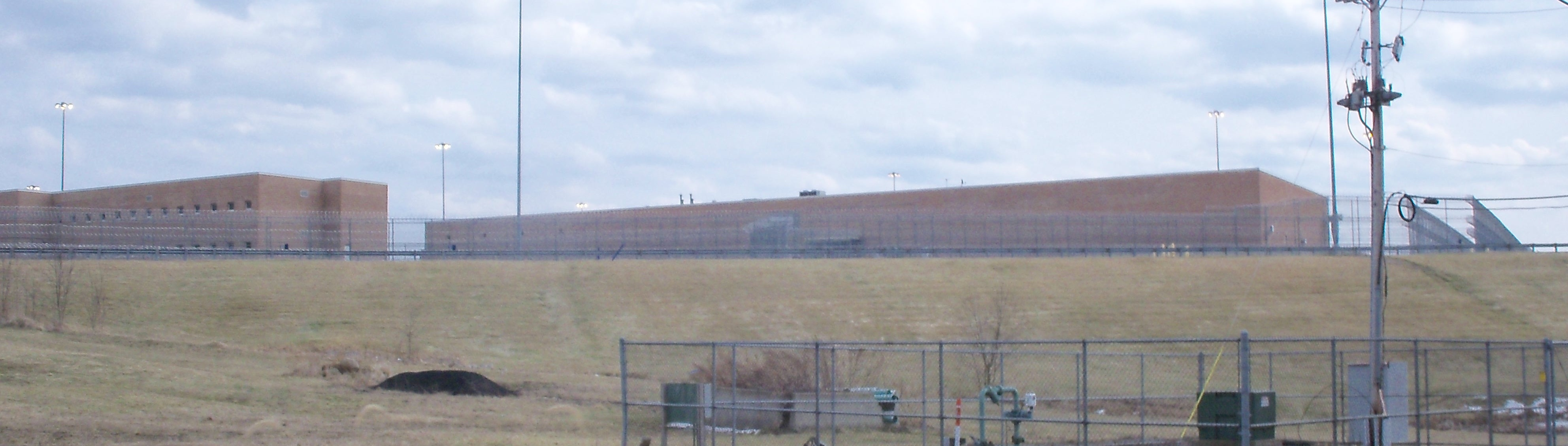
Elkton Federal Prison

On April 8, the National Guard arrived at Elkton Federal Prison in Columbiana County to assist the medical staff when a large number of prisoners became ill with the virus. On April 18, the National Guard and Highway Patrol arrived at the state prison in Marion county to assist with "mission critical functions" after infections of correctional workers and prisoners. By April 19, over 1800 prisoners at Marion Correctional Institution, approximately 3/4ths of the population, plus 100 staff had tested positive. Overall the prison system had almost 2500 cases by April 19, representing almost a fifth of Ohio's cases. On April 20 Acton said the prison testing results were indicating that as many as 70% of cases may be asymptomatic.

On April 22, the Marion County prison was the top hotspot for the virus in the country, and the Pickaway Correctional Institution was second-ranked. Marion County was first in cases per capita in the nation, while Pickaway County was fourth. The Ohio prison system is designed to hold about 35,000 inmates but held about 49,000 in April 2020.

On April 22, federal judge James S. Gwin ordered Elkton prison to identify vulnerable inmates and transfer them from the facility. He condemned the Federal Department of Corrections for its prior handling of the crisis.

On May 19, Gwin ordered federal prison officials to begin the process of releasing eligible inmates at Elkton into home confinement for health and safety reasons. He also chided the prison for slow progress in testing.

The Marshall Project reported May 28, 2021, that 135 state prisoners had died by that date, a rate of 28 per 100,000 prisoners. They reported 9,833 infections by that date, a rate of 20,100 per 100,000. 4,932 staff tested positive, and 10 died by the same date.

=== On public transportation ===
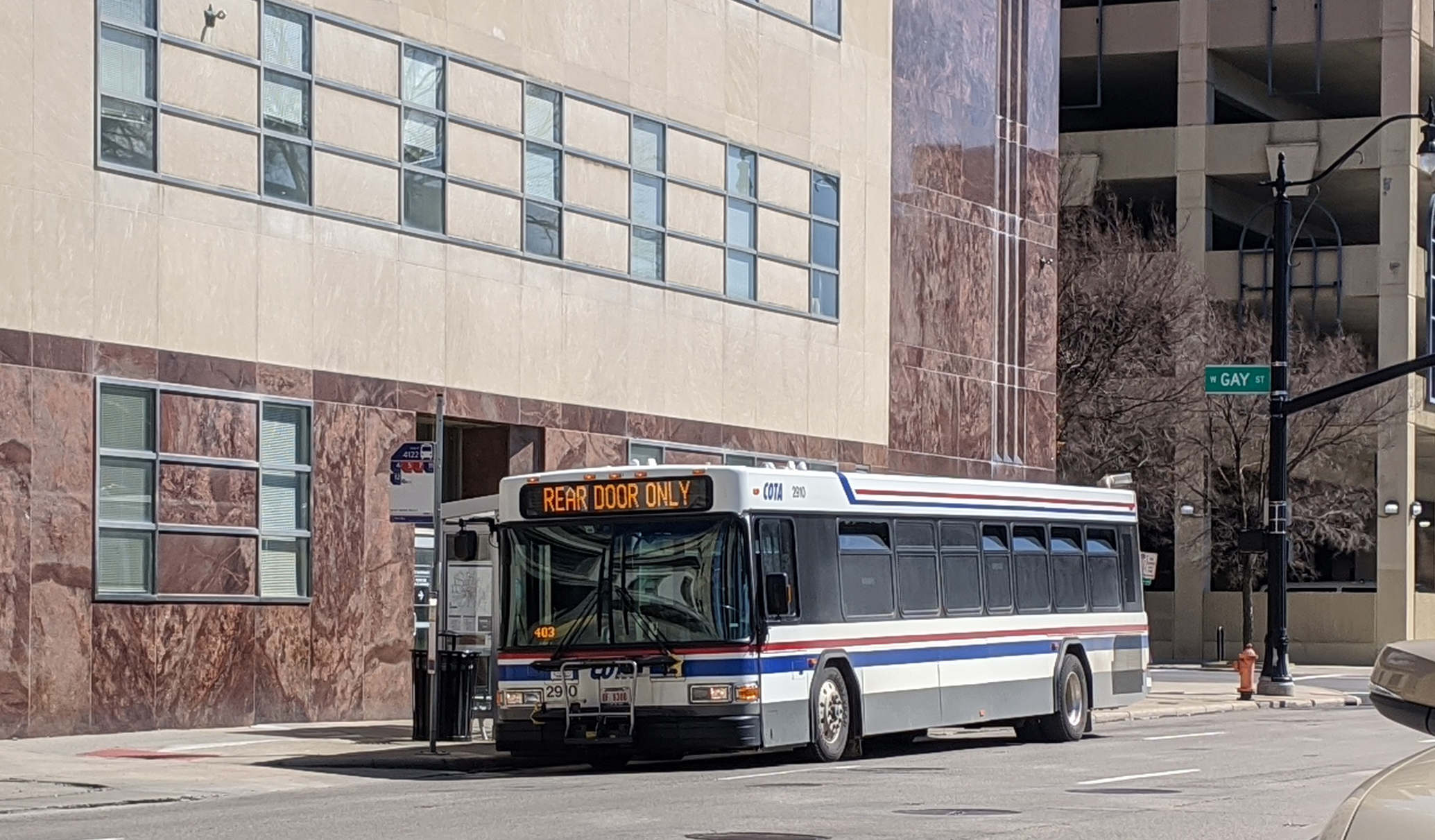
COTA buses notify riders to board using rear doors only

In early March, as the pandemic began affecting Columbus, the city's public transit ridership began dropping, approximately 40 percent. Its public transit agency COTA began by introducing thorough cleaning measures, followed by reducing several rush-hour services on March 17. On March 19, it suspended fare collection, making all rides temporarily free, and required passengers to board and depart buses from the rear doors. On the same day, it also modified all rush-hour lines and suspended its AirConnect and Night Owl services. On March 20, the agency recommended only using its services for essential travel; two days later it shut down several rush-hour services and reduced frequencies of nine crosstown lines. On March 24, it stopped all rush-hour services until further notice. On March 26, the agency began "dynamic service" to pick up customers left at bus stops by too-full buses; the agency's current policy is for a maximum of 20 passengers per bus.

By April 11, the Toledo Area Regional Transit Authority began requiring riders to wear face coverings.

=== On religion ===
The bishops of the Catholic Conference of Ohio suspended all public Masses in Ohio beginning March 16, dispensing with the obligation to attend Sunday Mass initially through Easter. On April 28, the suspension of mass and dispensation was extended through May 29. On May 8, the bishops announced the resumption of daily public Masses on May 25, with the dispensation continuing indefinitely.

The Genoa Baptist Church of Westerville, Ohio, switched to a drive-in format. The Bishop of the East Ohio Conference of the United Methodist Church urged the temporary closing of Methodist churches. Ohio's Amish steering committee advised all church districts to heed the state's orders against gatherings of more than 10, telling Amish "to cancel or postpone weddings, youth and family gatherings until further notice."

=== On the restaurant industry ===
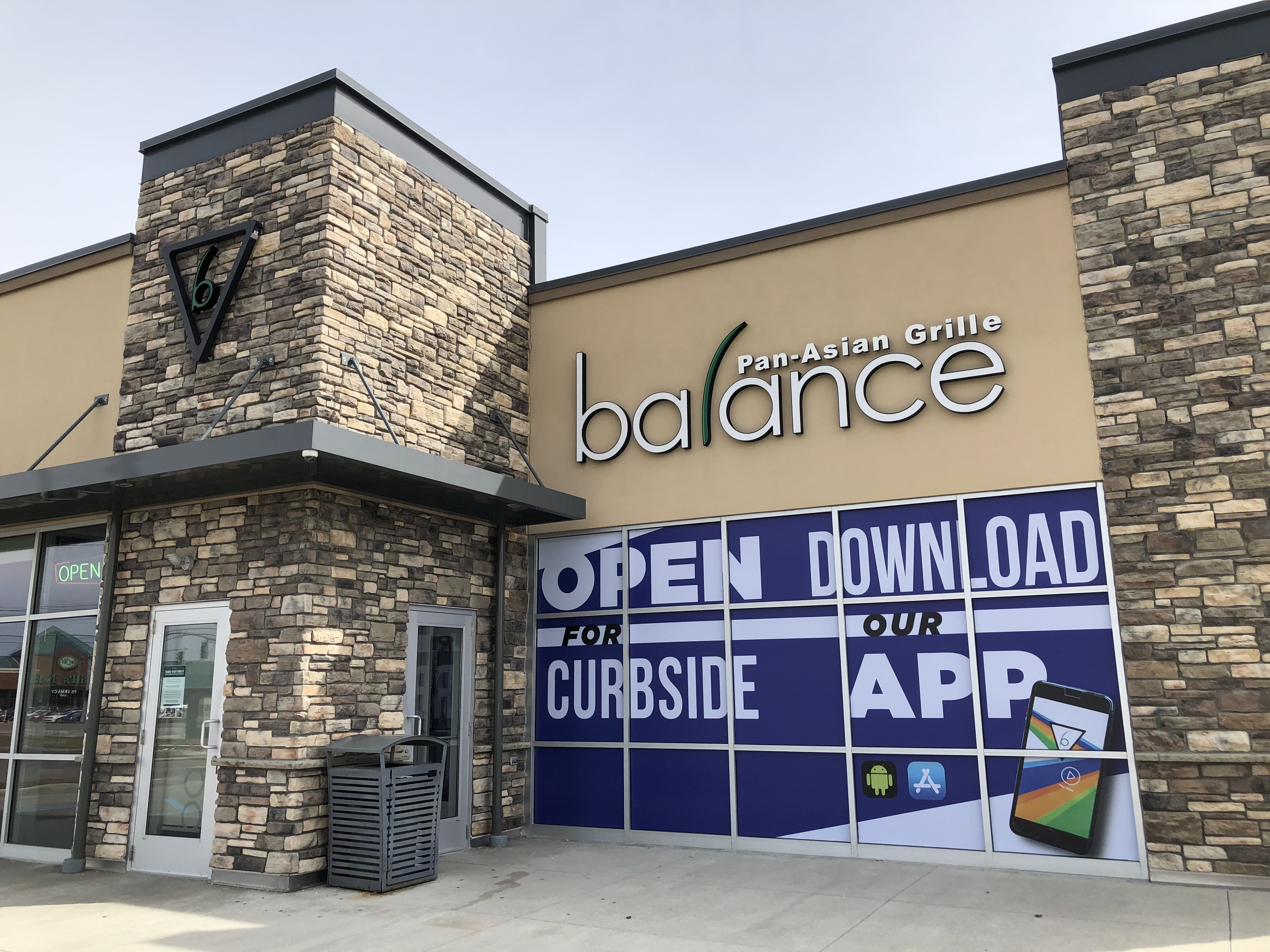
A restaurant in Perrysburg advertising takeout ordering during the pandemic.

The closing of restaurants and bars affected 22,000 restaurants across the state and 500,000 workers. In March 2020 a group of Cincinnati restaurateurs called on the federal government to provide a $225 billion bailout to the US restaurant industry.

=== On sports ===
Most of state's sports teams were affected. Several leagues began postponing or suspending their seasons starting 12 March. Major League Baseball (MLB) cancelled the remainder of spring training on that date, and on March 16, they announced that the season will be postponed indefinitely, after the recommendations from the CDC to restrict events of more than 50 people for the next eight weeks, affecting the Cleveland Indians and Cincinnati Reds. Also on March 12, the National Basketball Association (NBA) announced the season would be suspended for 30 days, affecting the Cleveland Cavaliers. In the National Hockey League (NHL), the season was suspended for an indefinite amount of time, affecting the Columbus Blue Jackets.

In college sports, the National Collegiate Athletic Association (NCAA) cancelled all winter and spring tournaments, most notably the Division I men's and women's basketball tournaments, affecting colleges and universities statewide. On March 16, the National Junior College Athletic Association (NJCAA) also canceled the remainder of the winter seasons as well as the spring seasons.

The Summit Motorsports Park announced they would ignore the stay-at-home order on April 16, and reopen for the 2020 season. At a panel held at the Ohio House of Representatives, the owner of the park testified his beliefs that the shutdown of businesses was more for political reasons than for health reasons, and that there was a nationwide mandate to mark every fatality in the United States of America as being caused by COVID-19.

On May 20, the Eldora Speedway owned by Tony Stewart, announced one of its largest events of the season would be rescheduled to June 2021 in accordance with the ongoing restrictions on mass gatherings and spectator sports at large venues. A decision on the dirt track's other major events was not announced.

== See also ==
- COVID-19 pandemic in Columbus, Ohio
- Timeline of the COVID-19 pandemic in the United States
- COVID-19 pandemic in the United States – for impact on the country
- COVID-19 pandemic – for impact on other countries
- Ohio Vax-A-Million
