= Texas EquuSearch =

Nonprofit search-and-rescue organization

Texas EquuSearch (/ˈɛkwəsɜːrtʃ/ EK-wə-surch; TES) is a search-and-rescue organization dedicated to searching for missing persons. It has increasingly become involved in high-profile abduction cases, including that of Natalee Holloway, working through local law enforcement agencies. TES is headquartered in Dickinson, Texas, a suburb of Houston.

== History ==
Originally named Texas EquuSearch Mounted Search and Recovery Team, TES was founded in August 2000 by Director Tim Miller after the abduction and murder of his daughter, Laura, one of the 34 bodies recovered from the "Texas Killing Fields". It is a 501(c)(3) non-profit, all-volunteer organization originally conceived as a volunteer mounted search-and-rescue group to assist local law enforcement personnel in searching the vast areas outside the city of Houston for missing individuals. Although TES has relatively few permanent members, many thousands of volunteers have since assisted in searches throughout the United States and in other countries.

Volunteers are typically trained on the spot when a search is necessary. The expectation is that volunteers know how to use the equipment they bring with them, whether that is a horse, a FLIR-equipped helicopter, or something in between. TES has gained a reputation as a well-equipped organization which can at short notice deploy resources such as radar, sonar, scuba diving or SAR dog teams, and vehicles ranging from all-terrain vehicles to boats to aircraft to remotely operated vehicles.

=== TES role in notable searches ===
- Natalee Holloway on initial search, with a follow-up after Joran van der Sloot's arrest in the murder of Stephany Tatiana Flores Ramírez.
- Disappearance and murder of Jessie Davis: TES organized a large search involving many regional SAR teams and spontaneous volunteers.
- Acres Homes, Houston, Texas: TES searched for possible bodies in a wooded area that had been the scene of recent body-dumping.
- Randy and Denim Sylvester: TES organized a PR campaign. The charred remains of the children were found in a suitcase and chest, located near a railroad track on Highway 3 in Houston, TX on June 21, 2008.
- Caylee Anthony, who was later found dead. Tim Miller wants Equusearch to be reimbursed for costs related to the search (over $110,000 for two-day search), since, according to Casey Anthony's trial testimony, the child was never missing.
- Disappearance of Vanessa Guillen: TES assisted in the large-scale search for Vanessa Guillen, a 20-year-old woman, who went missing from one of the biggest military bases in the U.S., the Fort Hood Army post in Texas.
