= Don Willis =

American pool hustler

Don Willis (May 1, 1909 – March 2, 1984) was a colorful pool hustler (known as the "Cincinnati Kid") from Canton, Ohio, who was considered one of the greatest money players of all time. In the late 1940s and 1950s, when pool was in decline and cash prizes for pool tournaments did not pay enough for a full-time income, Willis chose to travel America playing private pool games for money alongside world champion Luther Lassiter.

According to R. A. Dyer, Willis befriended Luther Lassiter in 1948 after beating Lassiter at nine-ball. Lassiter, who went on to become seven-time world champion, was perhaps America's best nine-ball player; together, the two men formed "arguably the most formidable road team in American history".

As Willis told the Evansville Courier & Press in 1977: "I broke Lassiter one night playing 9-ball in Elizabeth City, North Carolina. He suggested that we become road partners .... We split everything we made—sometimes as much as $5000 or $10,000 over a period of several days." When hustling with Lassiter, Willis often went first, playing the lemon to set up a victim for Lassiter, who would then finish the opponent.

In addition to pool, Willis played the game of ping pong so well he could win games playing with a bottle as a paddle. He also mastered a variety of other unusual skills on which he was known to gamble: for example, he could make as many as 42 wing shots in a row, beat anyone in a race running backwards, and juggle three pool balls along with the chalk. Willis boasted that he had even won bets "on the proposition that I can't name in order the hundred and thirty largest cities in the U.S." He threw 48 of 50 ringers against the horse shoe champion. He was also a basketball free throw hustler and a card player.

Although Willis "never won a major tournament…most of the greats acknowledged gambling losses to the Ohio-born hustler." Willis very likely could have won tournaments had he chosen to compete, but like many hustlers, he knew he could make more money hustling if he remained unknown. To quote R. A. Dyer: "he feared not defeat ... but rather exposure. He wanted no pictures in the paper." Because Willis did not play in tournaments, his talent was never widely recognized beyond a close circle of friends and family. The little documentation available on Willis tends to mention him chiefly in connection with Luther Lassiter, who said of him: "If I ever had to have someone else shoot pool for my life, win or lose, live or die, the man that I'd have shooting for me is Don Willis."
