= Murder of Jessie Davis =

Murder of American woman in 2007

- Undated family photo of Jessie Davis
- Location: Lake Township, Stark County, Ohio, U.S
- Date: June 14, 2007
- Attack type: Double-murder
- Deaths: 2 (Note: Including an unborn child.)
- Perpetrator: Bobby Lee Cutts Jr
- Charges: Aggravated murder (2 counts); Aggravated burglar; Gross abuse of a corpse; Child endangering
- Verdict: Guilty of all charges
- Sentence: Life imprisonment without the eligibility of parole for 57 years

The murder of Jessie Davis was committed on June 14, 2007, in Lake Township, Ohio, United States. Jessie Marie Davis, a 26-year-old woman who was near-term pregnant, was reported missing from her home. The disappearance and subsequent murder of Davis sparked national media attention.

On February 15, 2008, Bobby Lee Cutts Jr., a Canton City police officer and the father of her 2-year-old son and unborn daughter, was convicted of the aggravated murders of Davis and their unborn child. He was sentenced to life in prison without parole for 57 years on February 27, 2008. A high-school friend of Cutts, Myisha Lynne Ferrell, was also later charged.

== Disappearance and search ==
Jessie Marie Davis (born May 27, 1981) was last seen shopping at Acme Fresh Market, a local grocery store. Her mother reported her missing on June 15, 2007, when she found her 2-year-old grandson Blake home alone, with bleach spilled on the floor and furniture broken and overturned. In televised reports, Davis' mother (who had last spoken with her daughter two days earlier) reported that Blake kept stating, "Mommy broke the table" and "Mommy's in the rug". At the time of her disappearance, Davis was a resident of Lake Township in Stark County, Ohio.

A search of the area involving "thousands of volunteers" including members of Texas EquuSearch, was launched. On June 23, Davis' body was recovered in a wooded area in neighboring Summit County, in Hampton Hills Metro Park—a park surrounded by, but distinct from Cuyahoga Valley National Park, in the vicinity of Cuyahoga Falls.

The first reliable website to pin down the widely reported rumor that Cutts had assisted in locating the body of Davis was that of America's Most Wanted: "AMW sources have confirmed that Bobby Cutts Jr., Jessie's boyfriend and the father of her 2-year-old son Blake, led law enforcement to the body."

The post-mortem was performed by the Summit County authorities, as this is where the body was recovered. Her body was reported to be in an "advanced state of decomposition". The autopsy was performed the following day, confirming her identity. Investigators believe Davis was murdered on June 14, but confirmation of this, as well as the precise means of death, await the results of forensic tests. Bob Budgake, director of the Stark-Summit County crime lab, indicated that the lab was "working overtime and weekends to process evidence from the Jessie Davis case, two other recent murders and other investigations."

=== Funeral ===
A single-casket funeral for Jessie and her daughter was held June 30 at the House of the Lord, with a subsequent interment at Greenlawn Memorial Park. The arrangements were handled by the Silva-Hostetler Funeral Home, both in the Akron area. Although members of the Cutts family attended, Davis' son Blake did not. The family "felt the toddler had already been through enough." Approximately 750 people attended the service.

The service was also streamed online on local news stations' websites so people who could not attend could still see the service.

Her mother, Patricia Porter, said at the service that her daughter had been a committed God-fearing person after doing overseas missionary work, but at some point "she took a wrong turn somewhere." Porter said her daughter realized in church a few weeks ago that she needed to reform her life.

Prior to the funeral, hundreds of people paid their final respects for Davis with a candlelight vigil held outside her Lake Township duplex and during calling hours at the House of the Lord Church.

=== Trust fund for Blake Davis ===
In July 2007, Jennifer Snyder, a native of Lake Township, Ohio, established Blake's Bright Tomorrow, a trust fund for Blake Davis' college education. On July 21, Snyder organized the Blake's Bright Tomorrow festival and auction, which included signed memorabilia from LeBron James, Joe Theismann, Jerome Bettis, Faith Hill, and Tim McGraw.

Countrywide Home Loans also donated a home to Blake Davis and his grandmother, Patty Porter, who lived in a small apartment.

== Legal proceedings ==
=== Bobby Lee Cutts Jr. ===
Bobby Cutts Jr.
- 2007 mugshot of Cutts
- Born: Bobby Lee Cutts Jr. May 21, 1977 (age 49); Canton, Ohio, U.S.
- Occupation: Police officer (formerly)
- Convictions: Aggravated murder Murder; Aggravated burglary Child endangerment Gross abuse of a corpse
- Penalty: Life imprisonment without the eligibility of parole for 57 years

Details
- Victims: Jessie Davis and her unborn daughter
- Imprisoned at: Marion Correctional Institution

Davis' boyfriend, Bobby Lee Cutts Jr. was arrested and charged with two counts of murder on June 23, 2007. Cutts was a police officer in the Canton, Ohio, Police Department, and the father of Davis' son and unborn daughter. The Canton Police Department, which had not considered Cutts a suspect, did not participate in the arrest, which was executed by the FBI and the local Sheriffs department.

Cutts (born May 21, 1977, in Canton) is the son of Renee Horne and Bobby Cutts Sr. He was married to, but separated from, another woman at the time of the murder. According to Cutts, the couple had discussed a divorce. His wife formally filed for divorce four days after his arrest. Other allegations of abuse had previously been leveled against Cutts in Stark county.

For much of the period leading to the discovery of the body, local law enforcement told the news media that Cutts was not a suspect, or even a "person of interest". At the time of his arrest, Cutts was a resident of Plain Township in Stark County.

The only interview Cutts has granted to the press to date was published in The Repository. This was with Todd Porter, a sportswriter with whom Cutts had previous contact. Cutts denied he was involved. Porter writes: "Cutts looked tired, sullen, and depressed. He openly wept during an exclusive interview with The Repository from his home."

Cutts is believed to have been active on a dating site during the time Davis was missing and allegedly logged in just days before his arrest on June 23.

=== Myisha Lynne Ferrell ===
Cutts and Myisha Ferrell graduated together in 1995 from GlenOak High School.

The police raided Ferrell's apartment on June 23, seizing cleaning supplies and duct tape, among other things. The Canton Repository reported that:

A source close to Cutts told The Repository Saturday that Cutts said he asked a female friend help him remove Davis' body from her home. Cutts reportedly said Davis’ death was not his doing, but he thought no one would believe him and decided to hide the body.

The impression that Ferrell was involved in moving the body is reinforced by the statements made at the court hearing of July 2.

Ferrell was arrested and charged with obstruction of justice. At the time of her arrest, she was employed part-time at a local Denny's, and was undergoing eviction proceedings from her apartment.

On December 15, 2008, Ferrell was ordered released after serving one year of her two-year sentence, followed by three years of probation. Jessie Davis' mother and father were in attendance at the court proceeding.

=== Charges ===
Cutts and Ferrell were charged on June 25. Judge John Poulos set Cutts' bond at $5,000,000; Ferrell's bail was set at $500,000. That same day, Cutts was suspended without pay from the Canton Police Department. He had been on paid administrative leave.

=== Subsequent court proceedings ===
Each appeared at separate court hearings on July 2, before Judge Richard J. Kubilus. These preliminary hearings were meant for the prosecution to present sufficient probable cause to hold the accused. The complexity of the case, and the time frame of the arrests made this necessary as insufficient time existed to obtain an indictment. However, both defendants waived the preliminary hearing, and the case went to the grand jury. Cutts was represented by Bradley Iams, while Ferrell was represented by John Alexander Jr. of Akron. A request for bail reduction was made on behalf of Ferrell, but this was refused after the prosecutor said "Myisha Ferrell 'helped deposit the body' and lied to police officers several times throughout the investigation."

On November 5, 2007, as her trial was about to begin, Ferrell agreed to plead guilty to charges of obstruction of justice and complicity to gross abuse of a corpse for her role in Davis' disappearance and death. Under the terms of her plea agreement, Ferrell was sentenced to two years in prison—a sentence that may be lengthened unless Ferrell testifies honestly at the trial of Cutts. The judge said he would consider releasing Ferrell on probation after one year.

=== Trial of Bobby Lee Cutts Jr. ===
Cutts' trial began on February 4, 2008. On February 11, Cutts took the stand and described Davis' death. He said that he struggled with her in her house and struck her in the throat with his elbow. Cutts testified that he tried to resuscitate Davis after she became unconscious. He also said that he did not call 911 because Davis didn't have a telephone in her house and he didn't know how to turn on her cell phone.

On February 15, 2008, Cutts was convicted of the murder of Davis and the aggravated murder of her unborn child. He was also found guilty of associated charges, including aggravated burglary; gross abuse of a corpse; and child endangering. Cutts faced the possibility of life imprisonment or a death sentence. The jury, in its penalty phase, declined to impose a death sentence.

=== Final verdict and sentencing ===
Bobby Cutts Jr. was sentenced on February 27, 2008, to life imprisonment without the eligibility of parole for 57 years. He must serve each of his murder convictions consecutively.

== See also ==
- Crime in Ohio
- List of killings by law enforcement officers in the United States prior to 2009
- List of solved missing person cases (2000s)
