= William A. Lynch =

American lawyer and politician (1844–1907)

William Arnold Lynch
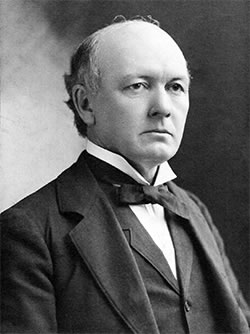
- Born: August 4, 1844; Canton, Ohio, US
- Died: February 6, 1907 (aged 62); Lisbon, Ohio, US
- Resting place: West Lawn Cemetery
- Occupation: Lawyer
- Known for: Politics
- Political party: Democratic

Signature
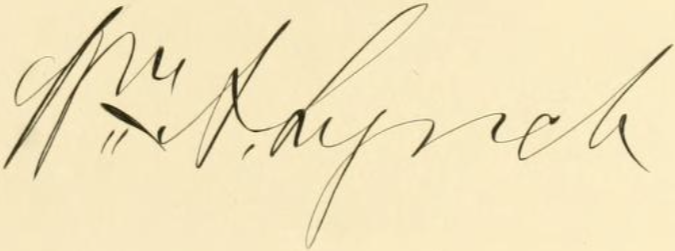

William Arnold Lynch (August 4, 1844 – February 6, 1907) was an American lawyer and politician.

== Biography ==
Lynch was born in Canton, Ohio, on August 4, 1844, to Arnold Lynch and Frances (née Horan) Lynch. Hus parents, both Irish immigrants, had moved to Ohio in their young adulthood. Arnold Lynch was employed as a surveyor and later held office as county surveyor and recorder of deeds. Arnold Lynch died in 1857, when his son was thirteen years old. William attended the public schools in Canton and graduated at the age of sixteen. He studied the law at a local attorney's office and was admitted to the bar in 1865. The next year, Lynch ran as a Democrat for the office of prosecuting attorney of the county and was elected. Lynch was appointed city solicitor of Canton the same year, holding both offices simultaneously. After completing a two-year term, he was defeated for reelection by his Republican opponent, future U.S. President William McKinley. Lynch was renominated in 1870, facing off again against McKinley, and was narrowly elected.

Lynch did not seek reelection in 1872, instead starting a private practice with William R. Day, the future Supreme Court justice. In 1874, he married Eliza Underhill, with whom he had three daughters. The next year, 1875, Day and Lynch faced off against McKinley in court, the two partners representing a group of coal mine owners, and McKinley representing a group of striking miners. The case involved charges the miners rioted when confronted with strikebreakers, but only one man was convicted. Lynch's brother, Austin, joined the firm in 1878, which then became known as Lynch, Day, and Lynch. William Lynch resigned from the partnership in 1882, but the firm continued and is the predecessor of the Canton, Ohio firm Day Ketterer, which still exists.

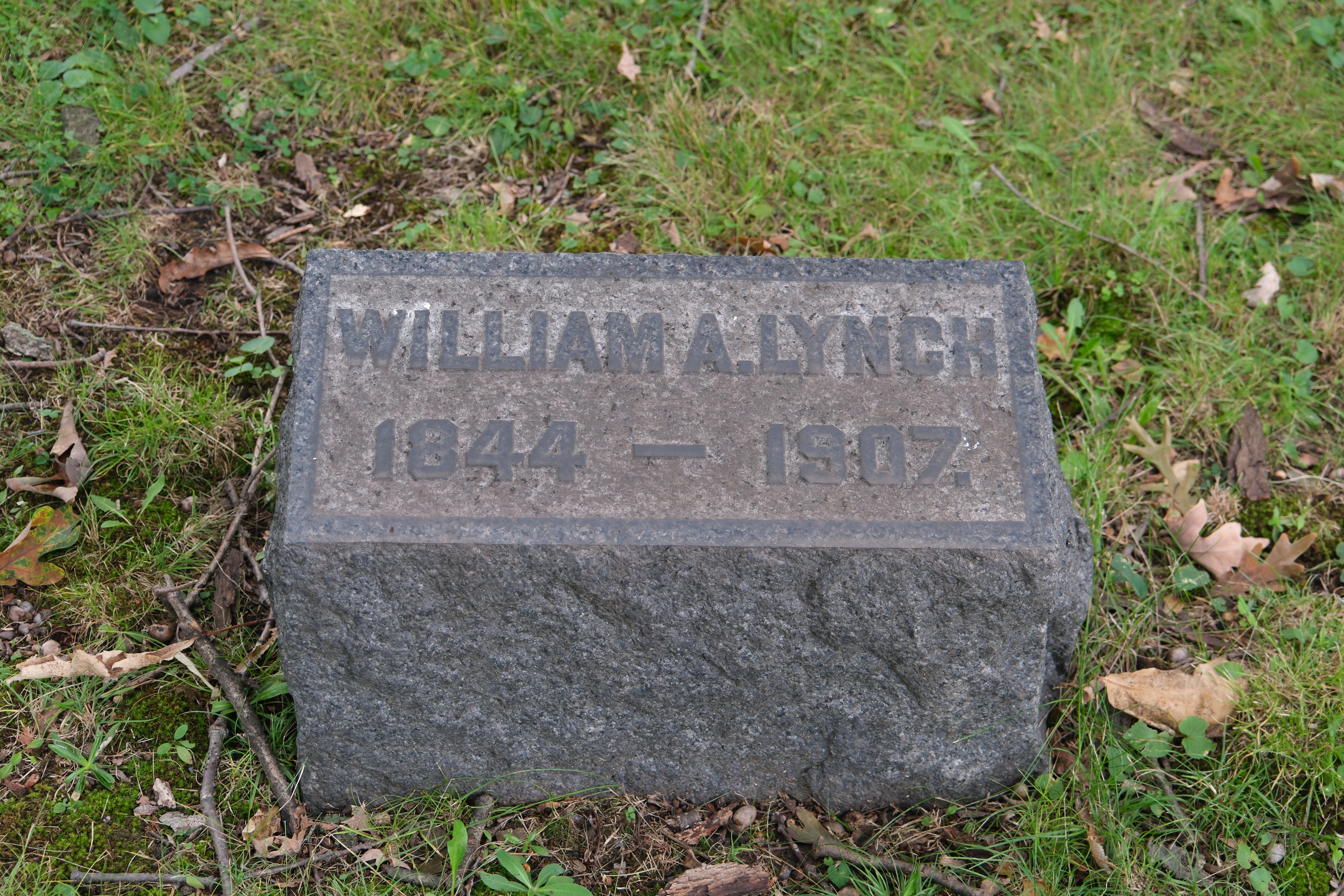
Grave of Lynch at West Lawn Cemetery

After leaving private practice, Lynch was exclusively employed working for railroad interests, including the Connotton Valley Railroad and the Pittsburgh, Akron & Western Railroad. He also was among the owners of the Canton and Massilon Electric Railway, an intercity line. After McKinley's assassination in 1901, Lynch was one of the founders of the McKinley National Memorial Association, which was responsible for the construction of the McKinley National Memorial. From 1903 to 1906, he served as a city councilman in Canton. He practiced law up to his final day, February 6, 1907, aged 62, when he died in the middle of a trial in Lisbon, Ohio.

== Sources ==
- Morgan, H. Wayne (2003). William McKinley and His America (revised ed.). Kent, Ohio: The Kent State University Press. ISBN 978-0-87338-765-1.
- Randall, Emilius Oviatt; Ryan, Daniel Joseph (1915). History of Ohio: the Rise and Progress of an American State. Vol. 6. New York, New York: Century History Co.
