= Bob Shaheen =

Robert A. Shaheen (born 1933) is a retired American businessman of Syrian descent who worked in Saudi Arabia starting in the early 1960s. Born in Canton, Ohio, Shaheen was employed as a high-ranking officer in operations owned by Adnan Khashoggi, a Saudi Arabian businessman involved in the international arms trade, representing Lockheed, Northrup, and Raytheon—United States defense systems contractors.

== Early life ==
Shaheen was the youngest of nine brothers and sisters. His parents immigrated to the United States during the Great Depression. When he was three years old, his father died, leaving his mother, who could not speak, read, or write English, to care for the family of nine children. For his part, he began selling newspapers at a corner movie theater at the age of six. He earned a degree in political science from Mount Union College in 1955. After serving in the US Army as a classification and assignment specialist, he began graduate studies at Georgetown University. Shaheen is known as a polyglot. While at Georgetown, he was recruited by the United States government in 1960 to move to Saudi Arabia. After serving in that capacity for two years, and during that period, he met Khashoggi.

== Career ==
In 1962, he began working as a high-ranking official to Adnan Khashoggi, a Saudi Arabian businessman. Shaheen spent the next 25 years with Khashoggi, establishing close personal relationships with the Saudi royal family and other Middle Eastern leaders and businessmen. Shaheen was president of Khashoggi's Triad Corporation. Khashoggi was commissioned by the late King Saud to help organize the Ministry of Defense protect their oil fields. In that capacity he brought in Lockheed, Northrup, Raytheon and General Electric and others as defense contractors.[4] Khashoggi and Shaheen opened the door for American, Asian, and European companies to enter business relationships in Saudi Arabia and the Middle East. Khashoggi and Shaheen negotiated "some of the most lucrative, and highly publicized deals of the 1970s and 1980s." Shaheen, who acted as Khashoggi's gatekeeper, was described as "charming" and a "brilliant organizer and people-mover". Shaheen was known for wearing a three-piece business suit regardless of the climate or location.

He has been featured with Khashoggi in many books, as well as a four-part TV series, and several television programs: Sixty Minutes, The Weekend Report, Good Morning America, and Lifestyles of the Rich and Famous. Books include: The Kingdom by Robert Lacey; Saudi Arabia Today by Peter Hobday; The Game Player by Miles Copeland; Money Rush by Andrew Duncan; Is My Armour on Straight by Richard Berendzen; The Deadly Payoff by Michel Clerc;The Marshall Plan by Jack Sheehan; The Pirate (book and TV series) by Harold Robbins; Vanity Fair, Serving the Superwealthy by Jamie Johnson.

== Family life ==
Shaheen lives in Boca Raton, Florida, with his wife Patricia Shaheen. He is the father of four daughters and one son.
