= Marion Correctional Institution (Ohio) =

Prison in Ohio, United States

Coordinates: 40°37′04″N 83°06′24″W

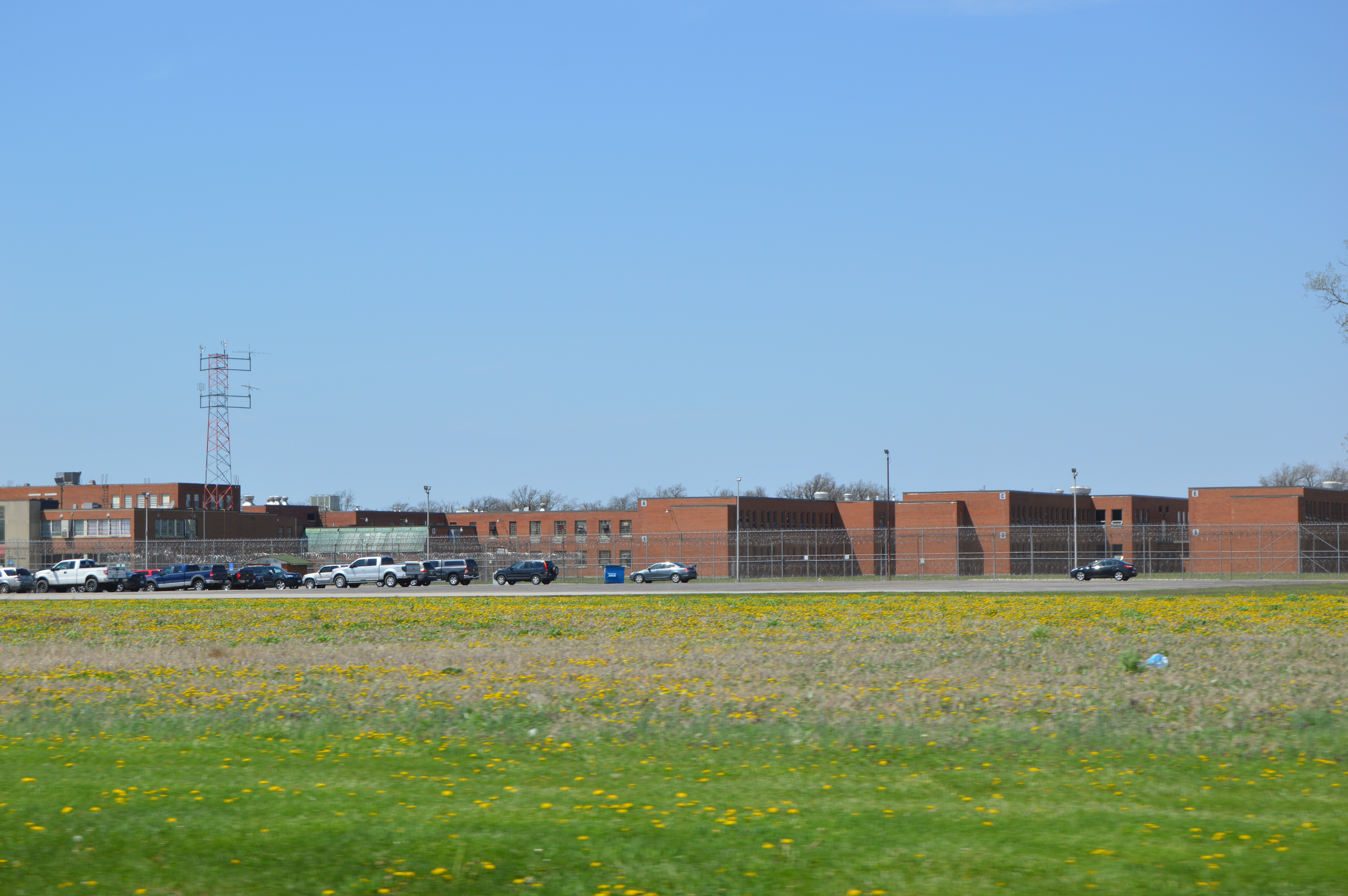
- Interactive map of Marion Correctional Institution
- Location: 940 Marion-Williamsport Road; Marion, Ohio
- Status: Open
- Security class: Security levels 1 & 2 (Minimum/Medium)
- Capacity: 2,623
- Opened: 1954
- Managed by: Ohio Department of Rehabilitation and Correction
- Director: Annette Chambers-Smith

Marion Correctional Institution (MCI) is a state-operated prison for men located in Marion, Ohio. The prison houses inmates with a security classification of Level 1 or 2. It dates back to the establishment of its precursor in 1948, occupying the site of a facility that housed German prisoners of war during World War II. Over the years, it housed inmates transferred from other correctional institutions, leading to the construction of the Marion Correctional Institution in 1952. The institution has hosted various inmate programs, legal interventions, and events.

Marion Correctional Institution introduced programs such as the "Project Newgate" college program in the 1970s, offering educational opportunities to inmates before their release. It also operated the "Papillon" drug rehabilitation program, and established an all-inmate chapter of the Red Cross during the 1980s.

In 1969, inmates filed Taylor v. Perini, a federal lawsuit alleging constitutional violations at the prison. This led to a consent decree and federal court intervention in the institution's operations.

The institution's history is also marked by notable events and individuals. A 1966 riot caused substantial damage, and the Marion Correctional Institution was featured in a music special featuring David Allan Coe, that covered his transition from incarceration to a music career. In recent years, the institution faced challenges related to technology security and COVID-19. An incident in 2015 revealed unauthorized computer access by inmates. In 2020, the institution became a COVID-19 hot spot due to factors such as crowding and delayed testing, raising concerns about inmate well-being.

== History ==
In 1948, the State of Ohio procured 1,243 acres of land from the United States Government. This land was previously part of the Scioto Ordnance Plant and contained the barracks used for German prisoners of war (POW) during World War II. Within the current prison-maintained graveyard lies the resting place of one German POW.

Initially, Ohio planned to utilize the barracks to accommodate adolescent offenders from the Boys Industrial School. Instead, the barracks were repurposed to house inmates transferred from the Ohio Penitentiary (OP) and the Ohio State Reformatory (OSR). The first batch of inmates arrived from the Ohio Penitentiary in June 1950 to aid in repairing existing structures on the property. OSR inmates joined in November of the same year. For the next four years, Reformatory inmates were incarcerated on this site.

Construction of what is now known as the Marion Correctional Institution commenced in 1952. Originally designed to include only dormitories, cell blocks were later incorporated to accommodate inmates from the overcrowded Ohio Penitentiary. (Approximately 30 years later, it was discovered that the original construction lacked steel reinforcements in the concrete block exterior walls, a deficiency that was subsequently rectified.) The initial capacity of the prison was set at 1,122, and the construction expenses totaled $8 million. In October of 1954, the first group of permanent inmates from the Ohio Penitentiary was relocated to the facility.

Marion Correctional Institution (MCI) has hosted several inmate education and rehabilitation programs. In the 1970s, it hosted the unit-managed "Project Newgate" initiative, which introduced college programming for Ohio inmates. Participants in the MCI program were granted furlough release one year before their actual release, during which they pursued college courses to continue after their prison release. The prison was also home to Ohio's initial residential inmate drug rehabilitation program, "Papillon," during the same period. The institution hosted a prison-sponsored AMVETS chapter. During the 1980s, its staff organized an all-inmate chapter of the Red Cross.

In 1969, inmates filed Taylor vs. Perini, a lawsuit that marked a federal court intervention in Ohio's prison operations. The lawsuit alleged a range of constitutional rights violations of inmates at Marion Correctional Institution. Through negotiations, a consent decree was established, outlining various operational changes that the institution agreed to implement. Due to ongoing disputes regarding compliance with the consent decree, a Special Master was appointed by the Federal Court in 1975 to oversee its execution. Vincent Nathan, a Toledo attorney without prior corrections experience, took the role of Special Master. The Taylor vs. Perini case concluded in 1991.

Inmates at MCI participate in holiday musical pageants during Christmas and Easter. The Prison News Network (PNN), a television production studio (now defunct due to inmates' misuse of computers for illicit purposes) produced video content for the institution's closed-circuit television channel. MCI was the location of the nation's inaugural interfaith housing unit (which was later closed due to a COVID-19 outbreak at MCI), where Jewish, Muslim, and Christian inmates resided together and engaged in programs to deepen their religious commitments and understanding of each other's faiths. In 1992, the institution obtained accreditation.

== Wardens ==
- 1954–1968: Lamoyne Green
- 1968–1986: E. P. Perini
- 1986–1992: Norris McMackin
- 1992–1996: Shirley Rogers
- 1996–2005: Christine Money
- 2005–2011: Margaret Beightler
- 2011–2016: Jason Bunting
- 2016–2021: Lyneal Wainwright
- 2021–2022: Leon Hill
- 2022–2024: Harold May
- 2024–present: George A. Fredrick

== Community engagement ==
=== Inmate catfish stocking program ===
In 2017, inmates at the Marion Correctional Institution (MCI) implemented a program where they raised catfish over the course of six months for the purpose of stocking ponds, such as the Alder Pond in Akron. The program aims to benefit the local community by enhancing recreational fishing opportunities while providing participants with aquaculture training.

Originally, inmates at the Marion Correctional Institution cultivated fish in an aquaponics facility on the prison premises, where water from the fish tanks was used to nourish vegetables grown in adjacent beds. The surplus vegetables were then donated to food pantries in nearby counties. The catfish raised in the facility, however, were often affected by ich. To redirect the program's benefits to the public, prison staff collaborated with the U.S. Fish and Wildlife Service and local parks officials.

Mike Johnson, Chief of Conservation for Summit Metro Parks, commented on the initiative and the stocking of fish in local ponds. The program gained interest from community members, particularly children and fishing enthusiasts, who now have improved chances of catching catfish in stocked ponds.

== Correctional programs ==
=== The Embark program ===
The Embark program at Marion Correctional Institution, operated by the non-profit ministry Kindway, is a faith-based reentry ministry designed to assist incarcerated individuals in successfully reintegrating into the community. The program, established in 2011, involves volunteers recruited by Kindway and aims to prepare inmates for release and support them for at least a year after their release.

=== Horizon Interfaith Dorm ===
The prison's Horizon interfaith dormitory, introduced under Warden Christine Money, accommodates Christians, Jews, and Muslims, and was set up so that inmates lived in family units of six. The American Correctional Association recognized this dormitory during its meeting in Nashville, Tennessee.

=== AMVETS Marion Post 42 ===
AMVETS Post 42, located within the Marion Correctional Institution (MCI) in Marion, Ohio, is a group of incarcerated veterans who engage in volunteer work. This post is the only incarcerated AMVETS post in Ohio, which was established in 1974 when incarcerated individuals submitted an application to the AMVETS State Department of Ohio and the prison's warden to form the post. Their stated aim was to continue their service even while incarcerated.

The post operates within the prison with the support of the prison administration and staff advisors.

AMVETS Post 42 engages in various charitable activities and programs:

- Sewing therapy: Inmates participate in sewing therapy, creating blankets made from donated yarn for Ohio Veterans Homes and crafting teddy bears for local hospitals and police departments to distribute to children in need.
- Facing Yourself Program: This program encourages participants to address the underlying issues that led to their incarceration through self-reflection and self-improvement.
- Veteran Resource Fairs: The post hosts annual veteran resource fairs, inviting outside agencies and veteran groups to share resources with incarcerated veterans.
- Community support: The post actively supports its community. It donated funds to Stockhands Horses for Healing, an equine therapy farm serving veterans and children with disabilities, by providing funds for hay.
- Birthday celebrations: For incarcerated individuals aged 70 or older at MCI, the post organizes birthday celebrations, including ice cream and cake, to make their birthday memorable.
- Equestrian therapy: AMVETS Post #42 initiated an equestrian therapy program in collaboration with Stockhands Horses For Healing, a non-profit organization offering therapy to veterans suffering from PTSD and other issues.
- Charitable donations: The post donates to various charities, including Toys For Tots, Wags For Warriors, Pets For Vets, and Save A Warrior.

=== Teaching writing in prisons ===
Piper Kerman, the author of "Orange Is the New Black: My Year in a Women's Prison," has been conducting writing classes for inmates at the Ohio Reformatory for Women and the Marion Correctional Institution in Ohio. Kerman, who also advised on the Netflix series based on her book, teaches creative nonfiction writing to prisoners as a means of helping them find a sense of freedom and self-expression through their writing. Her stated goal is to amplify the voices of incarcerated individuals and shed light on their experiences within the criminal justice system. The classes have been described as supporting inmate rehabilitation. Kerman's own personal experience of serving time in prison adds a unique perspective to her teaching approach.

== Notable inmates ==
- Bobby Lee Cutts Jr.
- David Allan Coe
- Don King (1967–1971)
- John F. Boyle Jr.
- Kevin Keith
- Sam Sheppard

== Notable events ==
=== 1966 ===
A riot that occurred at The Marion Correctional Institution on August 23, 1966, led to significant destruction, resulting in an estimated $500,000 (approximately $5,000,000 adjusted for inflation as of 2026) in damages. Approximately 900 prisoners took part in the riot, during which fires were intentionally set. The situation was brought under control by a response team of around 250 heavily armed officers.

=== 1973 ===
==== Escapes and legal injunctions ====
The Marion Correctional Institution witnessed a series of 47 escape incidents, attributed by law enforcement to the consequences of a 13-month-old injunction. These events led Marion County Sheriff Ronald Scheiderer to advocate for a thorough investigation into the institution's operational dynamics, a proposal he publicly announced during a press conference.

The origin of these circumstances lay in a legal case initiated by two inmates who alleged violations of their civil rights. The subsequent injunction, issued in June 1972 by Federal Judge Donald J. Young in Toledo, introduced significant changes to various aspects of the prison's management. It delineated protocols for prisoner disciplinary actions and enforced their civil and constitutional rights. Additionally, the injunction dictated terms for prisoners' access to legal resources such as law books and typewriters, as well as their right to communicate through uncensored mail. The injunction stipulated that disciplinary measures required prior approval from a federal court before implementation.

Marion County Sheriff Scheiderer highlighted the impact of this injunction on the institution's administration and staff morale. The order transferred administrative authority from the prison's guards and superintendent to Judge Young, making him the de facto administrator of the facility. This shift in control reportedly resulted in reduced morale among staff members and a perceived erosion of their authority to manage inmate behavior.

These escape incidents led to increased criminal activity in the surrounding area, including break-ins, auto thefts, firearm thefts, hostage situations, and even violent crimes such as rape. A fatal incident involved Marion County Deputy William Bender, who lost his life in a collision with a truck while responding to the pursuit of escapees.

In the context of these events, the response by Ohio Highway Patrol Capt. J. J. Fuenkamp, during a particular escape incident, was recognized. Capt. Fuenkamp was formally acknowledged through a citation, presented by Col. Robert M. Chiaramonte in an official ceremony at the Ohio Highway Patrol Academy. This commendation recognized Fuenkamp's role in rescuing a mother and her five children who had been held hostage by two escaped inmates in a residence located in New Washington. Peter Perini, Superintendent of the Marion Correctional Institution, also received recognition through a certificate for his role in managing the situation.

=== 1975 ===
==== Involvement in David Allan Coe's music special ====
The Marion Correctional Institution was featured in a music special featuring David Allan Coe, a country-western artist and former inmate of the Marion Correctional Institution. Scheduled as part of Channel 13's "Ten Terrific Nights," the 90-minute program, titled "The Mysterious Rhinestone Cowboy," blends a live in-studio concert with a documentary-style film. The program highlights Coe's transition from ex-prisoner to musical artist. The Channel 13 film crew accompanies Coe, capturing his experiences, which include a return visit to the Marion Correctional Institution in Ohio. The program includes interviews with E.P. Perini, the institution's warden.

=== 1977 ===
==== Boxing event in prison ====
One event in the United States Boxing Championships tournament, organized by promoter Don King was held at a prison in 1977. On March 6, 1977, a seven-fight card was set to take place, with two matches broadcast live on national television. This event marked the first time a nationally televised live program was hosted within a prison.

Howard Cosell, a boxing commentator of the era, called the matches. The audience included the prison's inmates, media members, and select VIPs. Don King, wearing a gold jacket, addressed the crowd before the matches, expressing his connection to the prison and the inmates' role in his life. Attendees included former heavyweight champion Joe Louis and other dignitaries present.

The matches included notable fighters like Art "Tap" Harris, who won a middleweight bout by TKO, and future heavyweight champion Michael Dokes, who fought in one of the undercard fights. The main event featured 18-year-old welterweight Wilfredo Benitez, who was already a world champion, securing a victory in a decision.

=== 2014 ===
==== TEDxMarion Correctional ====
Marion Correctional Institution has hosted TEDx events, featuring speakers including Piper Kerman, known for her memoir "Orange Is the New Black," who shared insights into the experiences and challenges of those incarcerated, advocating for criminal justice reform. These TEDx events included talks such as "Refolding the Box?" by Dan Royston, who suggested that reshaping the carceral system could lead to more effective rehabilitation, and Tim Smith's "Mentor Madness; Loss, Gain, and Other Irritating Realities" explored the dynamics of mentorship within correctional facilities.

=== 2015 ===
==== Inmates hack computers ====
In 2015, suspicious activities related to the recycling program were noticed. Computers were discovered hidden in the ceiling of the prison. These computers were connected to the prison's network, giving unauthorized access to inmates. Inmates used the computers for various purposes, including applying for credit cards using stolen identities. This scheme involved communication from the prison to a community nonprofit and then to banks.

Adam Johnston, one of the inmates who was at the center of this scheme, had technical expertise and managed to access the prison's network. He stole inmate information and engaged in credit-card fraud.

=== 2016 ===
==== Najmuddeen Salaam ====
Najmuddeen Salaam (born Johnny L. Clark) served 18 years in prison and eventually became an advocate and mentor for incarcerated individuals. However, he was arrested in 2016 and charged with involvement in smuggling drugs into the Marion Correctional Institution.

After serving his sentence for a rape conviction, Salaam volunteered at Marion Correctional Institution, offering guidance to those in prison. However, a provision within the Prison Rape Elimination Act (PREA) enacted in 2012 deemed that individuals with sex offense charges could not be employed or contracted at a prison facility, leading Salaam to lose his position at the Marion Correctional Institution.

Salaam's efforts to challenge this act took him to Washington, D.C., where he engaged with Senators Sherrod Brown and Rob Portman. His goal was to address the section of PREA that restricts individuals like him from working within prison facilities.

Ohio Department of Rehabilitation and Corrections Director Gary Mohr has also taken action to amend the regulations. Mohr filed an appeal with the Department of Justice, proposing that ex-offenders should be allowed to work within prisons if they have maintained a clean record for five years and exhibited a dedication to pro-social endeavors.

In 2016, Salaam was arrested in connection with allegations of smuggling drugs into the facility. Authorities later reported that he removed his GPS ankle monitor while awaiting trial and fled before later being killed in 2018.

Salaam was killed as a result of gun violence on March 28, 2018.

=== 2020 ===
==== COVID-19 response ====
The Marion Correctional Institution in Ohio became a major coronavirus hot spot due to a combination of factors such as limited access to cleaning products and tight living quarters. The outbreak at Marion Correctional Institution was initially driven by a high infection rate among inmates. Over 80% of the prison's population tested positive for COVID-19. Governor Mike DeWine ordered widespread testing of inmates, which uncovered a large number of asymptomatic cases that might not have been detected otherwise.

After testing, there were delays in receiving the test results. During this waiting period, inmates who had been tested were returned to their cell blocks or dorms, allowing more time for the virus to spread among the incarcerated population. Inmates reported inadequate access to cleaning supplies, such as hand sanitizers and bleach. This lack of effective cleaning products raised concerns about the cleanliness of their living spaces and the potential for the virus to persist on surfaces.

The close living quarters and limited ability to socially distance from others seen in prisons created an environment that contributed to the rapid spread of the virus.
