= Kathryn Karipides =

American choreographer, dancer, & professor

Kathryn Karipides (born February 29, 1934) is an American choreographer, modern dancer, and former Case Western Reserve University professor. In 1969, Karipides and her colleague Henry Kurth formed The Dance Theatre of Kathryn Karipides and Henry Kurth at Case Western. There she worked for ten years as co-director, choreographer, and principal dancer.

She is a proponent of modern dance and believes in expressing "anatomical truths" through choreography and movement.

== Early life ==
Karipides was born in Canton, Ohio on February 29, 1934. Karipides had little formal dance training, participating primarily in the Greek dancing style prevalent in her native community. It wasn't until she attended college at Miami University (Ohio) that Karipides began her formal dance education. In 1956, Karipides graduated from Miami University with a B.S. Degree in Physical Education. Upon graduation, Karipides began her career at the Flora Stone Mather College for Women, part of Western Reserve University, now Case Western Reserve University. Karipides grew the college's dance program from a physical education class program within its theater department.

== Case Western Reserve University ==
First hired within the Flora Stone Mather College, Karipides initially started her career as a temporary professor in the women's physical education department. Karipides was promoted to associate professor with tenure in 1963. In 1972, the dance program that Karipides started as a part of the physical education curriculum became a part of the theatre arts department. In 1975, Karipides became a co-director for the new Graduate Dance Program and later became a full professor in 1980. Throughout her career, Karipides served in a variety of administrative roles within the dance department, including Acting Chair and Interim Deputy Provost. Karipides retired from Case Western in 1998 as a Samuel B. and Virginia C. Knight Professor Emerita.

== Intensive studies ==
When Karipides started her career at Case Western Reserve University, she spent her summers studying modern dance outside of the institution. For three summers, Karipides studied at Connecticut College. At Connecticut College, Karipides studied with modern dance artists including Martha Graham, Merce Cunningham, Lucas Hoving, José Limón, and Louis Horst.

Throughout her career, Karipides has studied with many other modern dancers including Hanya Holm, Erick Hawkins, Kelly Holt, and at many studios around the world including Hawkins Studio, Mary Wigman Studio, Dalcroze Institute, and Laban Art of Movement Studio.

== Cleveland Arts Prize ==
The Cleveland Arts Prize aims to recognize exemplary artists in areas such as design, literature, theater, dance, music, and visual arts. In 1974, Karipides received the Cleveland Arts Prize for Dance. After winning this award, Karipides became closely involved with the organization, joining the board and chairing the Dance Prize Committee. In 2017, Karipides was recognized as a Cleveland Arts Prize "special honoree," selected from the pool of past candidates.

== Other awards and honors ==
- Carl F. Wittke Award for outstanding undergraduate teaching (CWRU)
- Samuel B. and Virginia C. Knight Professor of Humanities Honoree (CWRU)
- OhioDance Award
- Northern Ohio Live Award of Achievement for Dance
- YWCA Career Women of Achievement Award for the Cultural Arts
- Dionysian Award Recipient (Cleveland Chapter, American Hellenic Educational Progressive Association)

== Notable premieres ==
- Burning Water
- A Galaxy of Instants
- Lyre of Orpheus
- By Disposition of Angels
- The Praise of Folly
- With Antecedents: Mounds
- Landscape with Creature
- Applause
- Anatoli
- Four by Four
