= Red Lion, Ohio =

Unincorporated community in Ohio, U.S.

Coordinates: 39°29′29″N 84°14′59″W

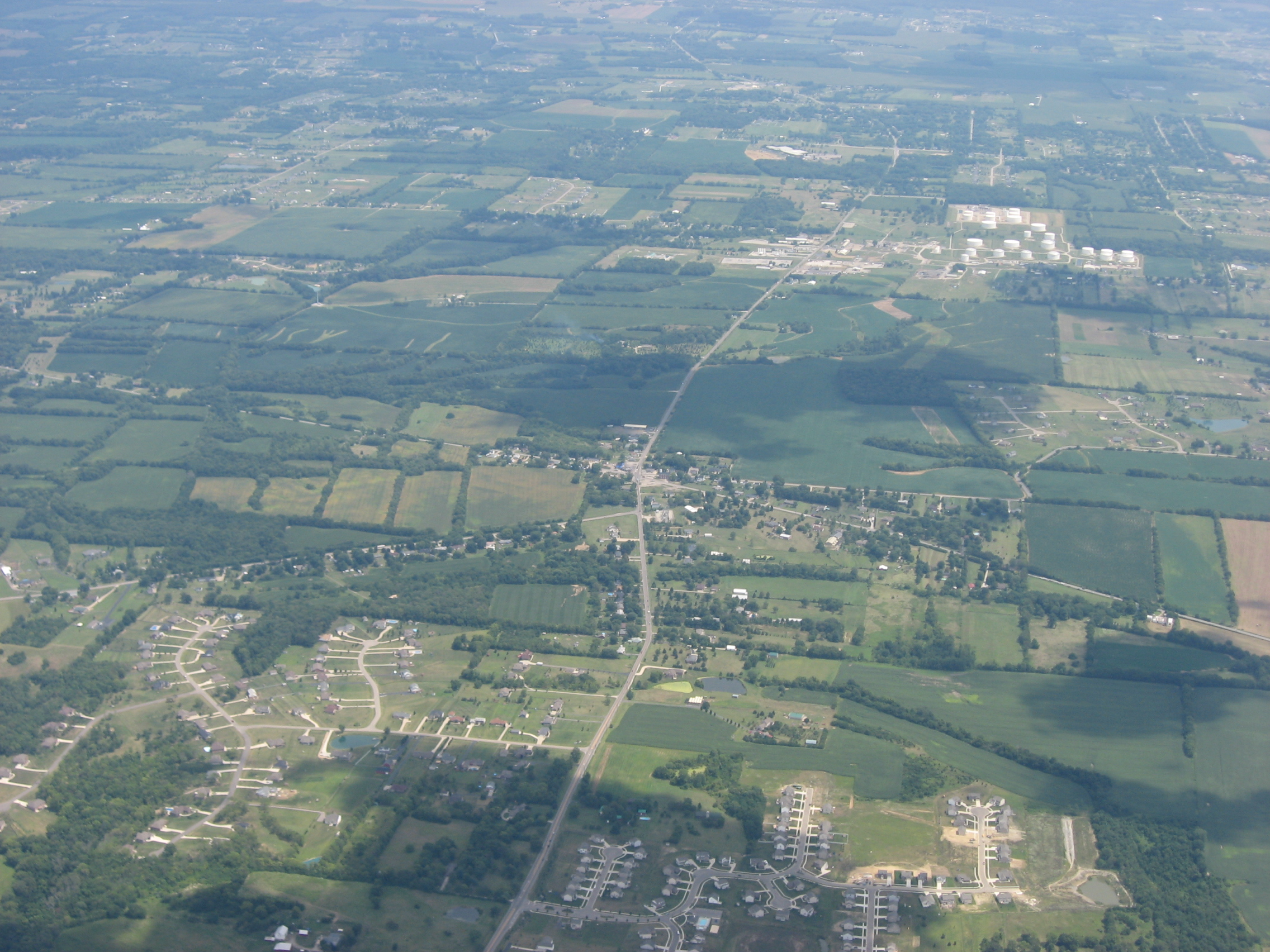
Aerial view of Red Lion

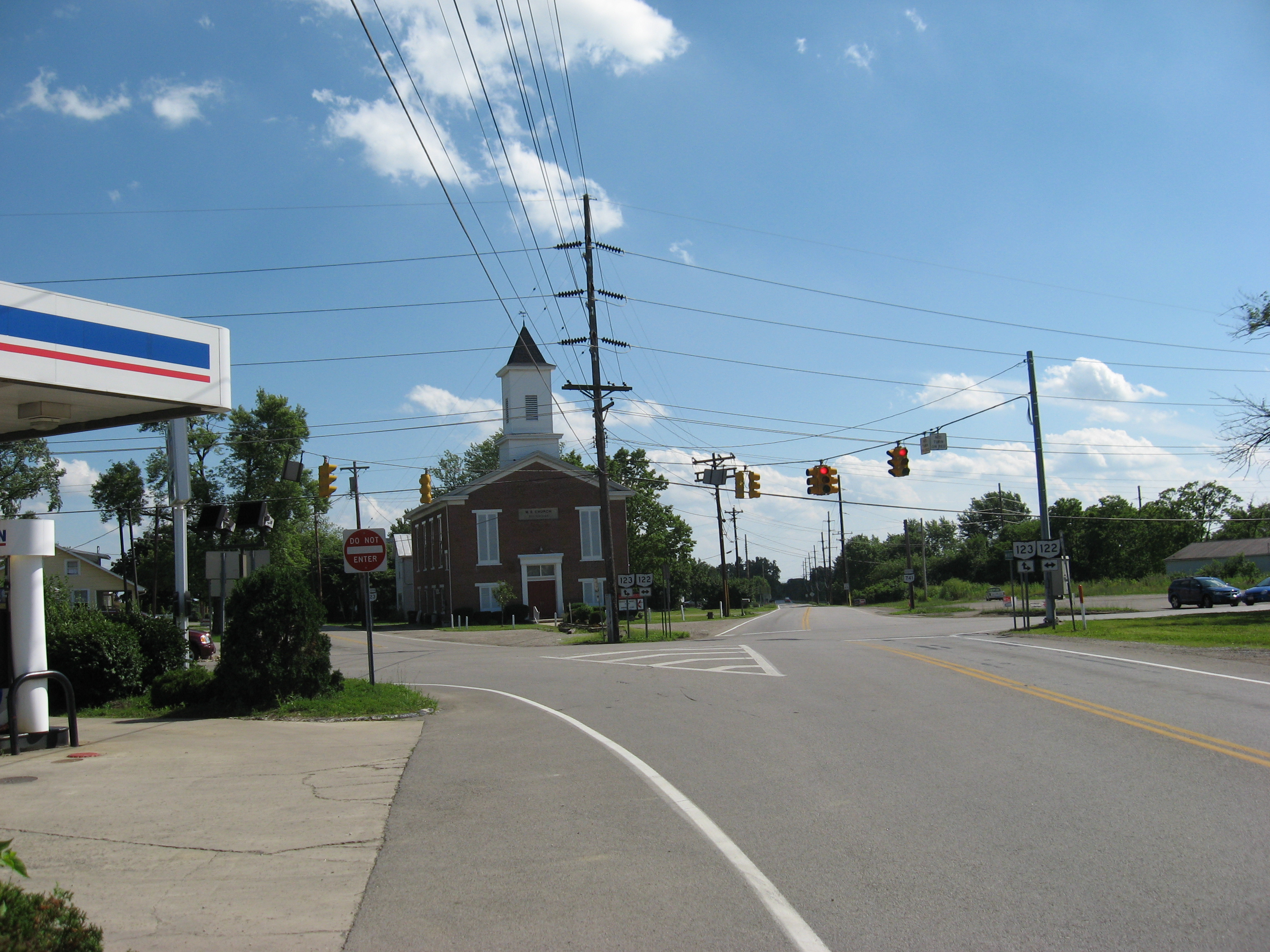
Central Red Lion

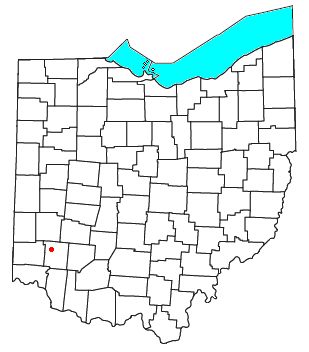
Location of Red Lion, Ohio

Red Lion is an unincorporated community in southwestern Clearcreek Township, Warren County, Ohio, United States, at the intersection of State Routes 741, 122, and 123. Red Lion is approximately five miles south of Springboro and five miles northwest of Lebanon.

== History ==
Red Lion was originally called Westfield, and under the latter name was laid out in 1817. The community's Red Lion Tavern, with a red lion rampant on its signboard, became a well-known landmark, and the community was soon known by the name "Red Lion". A post office called Red Lion was established in 1834, and remained in operation until 1903.
