= List of Ohio train stations =

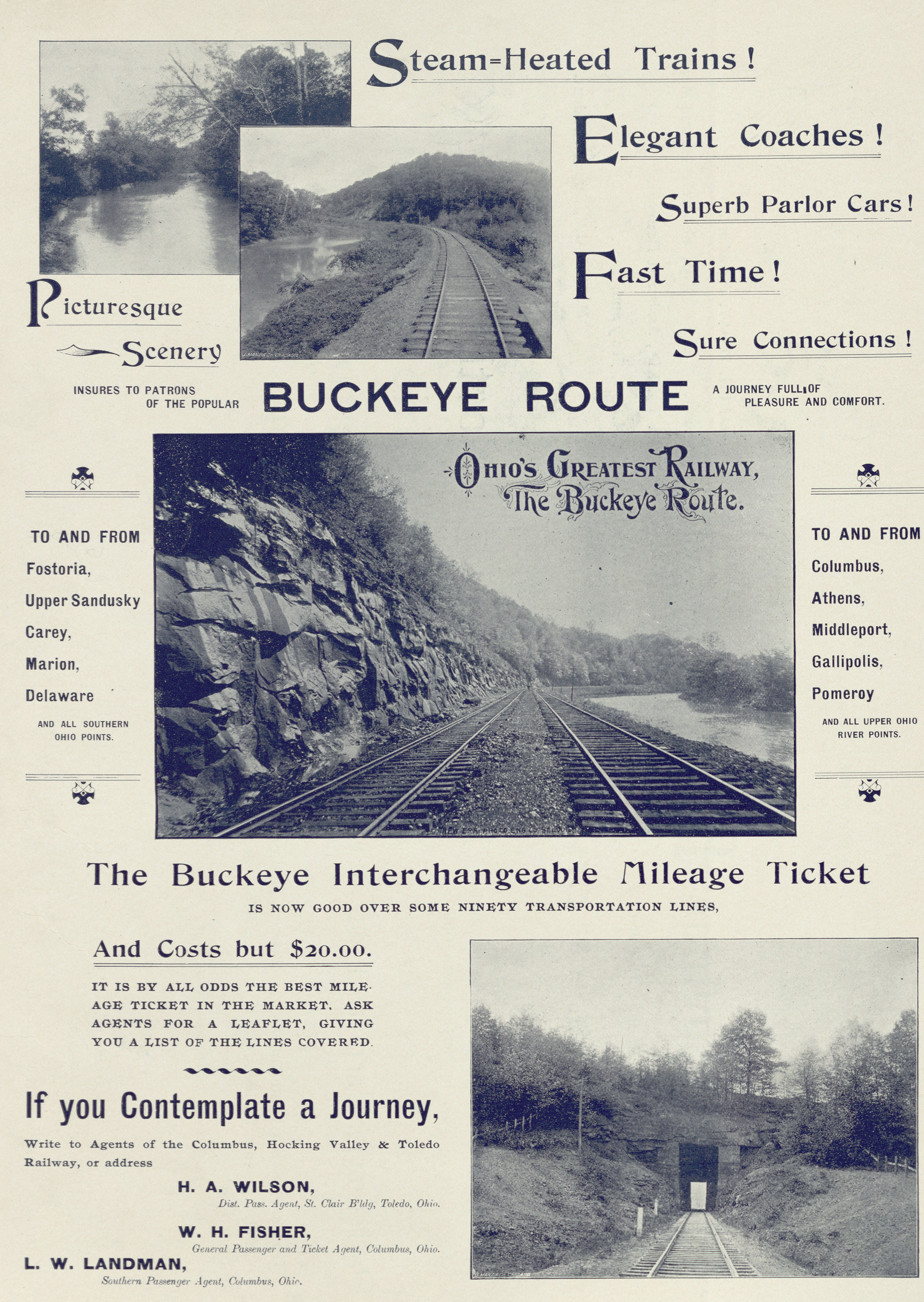
A 1985 advertisement for the Buckeye Route connecting Ohio's cities by rail

Amtrak offers three passenger train routes through Ohio, serving the major cities of Toledo, Cleveland, and Cincinnati.

The major cities of Columbus, Akron and Dayton do not have Amtrak service. Columbus is the second largest metropolitan area in the U.S. without passenger rail service. Columbus last had service with the National Limited in 1979. Dayton (which lost service in 1979 with the termination of the National Limited) and Akron (which lost service in 2005 with the termination of the Three Rivers) are the eleventh and twelfth.

Of the cities in Ohio, only Greater Cleveland has rail mass transit, with rail stations within or "across the road" from the following communities:

- Beachwood (Blue and Green Lines end near Beachwood)
- Brook Park (across from Airport and Brook Park stations)
- Cleveland
- Cleveland Heights (couple blocks from Cedar–University, Coventry–Shaker, and Shaker Square stations)
- East Cleveland (Red Line ends at the Louis Stokes Station at Windermere)
- Lakewood (across from Madison–W.117 and Triskett–West 140th. stations)
- Shaker Heights (Blue and Green Lines)

Cleveland had a subway line crossing the Cuyahoga River on the lower-deck of Detroit-Superior Bridge traveling between Ohio City (near Detroit and West 25th. St.) and downtown Cleveland. Currently, it is open only for historical walking tours. Cleveland still has one subway line today, the Red Line, running from Cleveland-Hopkins International Airport to Louis Stokes-Windermere via Tower City-Public Square where it connects with the other lines, which are light rail. Cleveland also had a much larger, electric-powered light-rail streetcar system of rail coaches and overhead lines, which were replaced by diesel-powered city transit buses.

Cincinnati once started construction of a subway, but work was abandoned during the Great Depression. Cincinnati has had efforts in the 21st century to revive train service with plans to extend train service from the Cincinnati Airport (CVG) in Kentucky to downtown Cincinnati, to Kings Island. However, funding for this project has not been found.

There are also several passenger railroad lines and train stations in Ohio which offer scenic train rides.

== Amtrak service ==
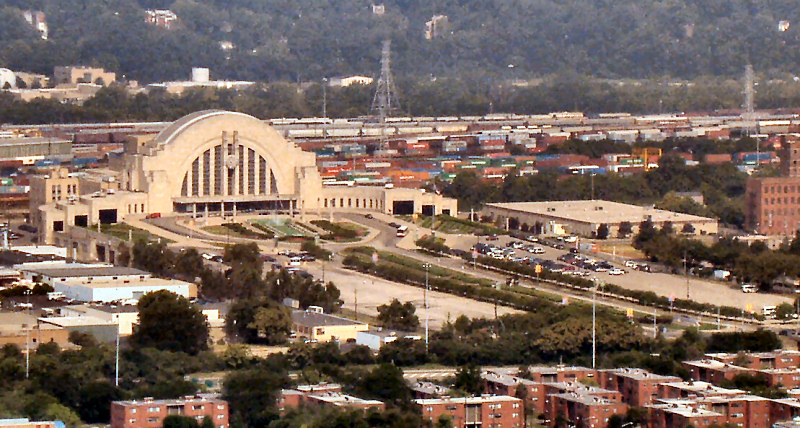
Cincinnati Union Terminal.

=== Cardinal (Chicago – Cincinnati – Washington DC – New York) ===
- Cincinnati: Cincinnati Union Terminal (CIN)

The Cardinal enters Ohio near College Corner, travels through Hamilton, and stops at Cincinnati Union Terminal. After leaving Cincinnati, the train crosses into Kentucky, where it follows the Ohio River on the southern border of Ohio to Ashland, Kentucky.

The Kentucky and West Virginia stations of Maysville, South Shore–South Portsmouth, Ashland, and Huntington are on Ohio's state border; the South Portsmouth–South Shore station primarily serves Portsmouth, Ohio.

=== Floridian (Chicago – Cleveland – Pittsburgh – Washington DC) ===
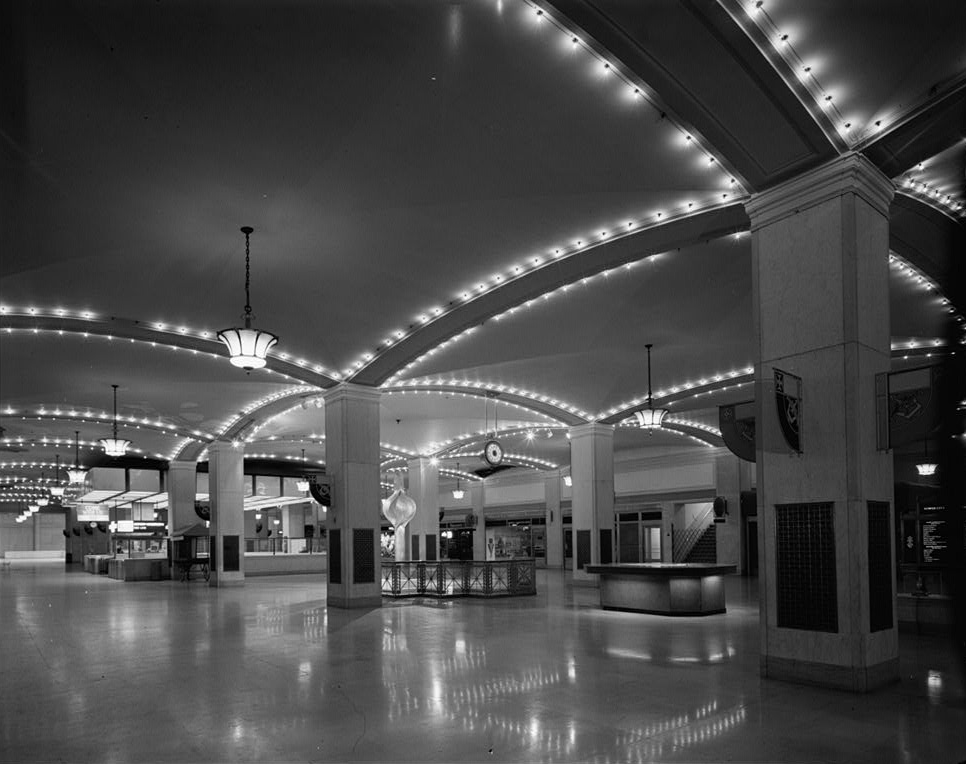
Cleveland Union Terminal concourse in 1987.

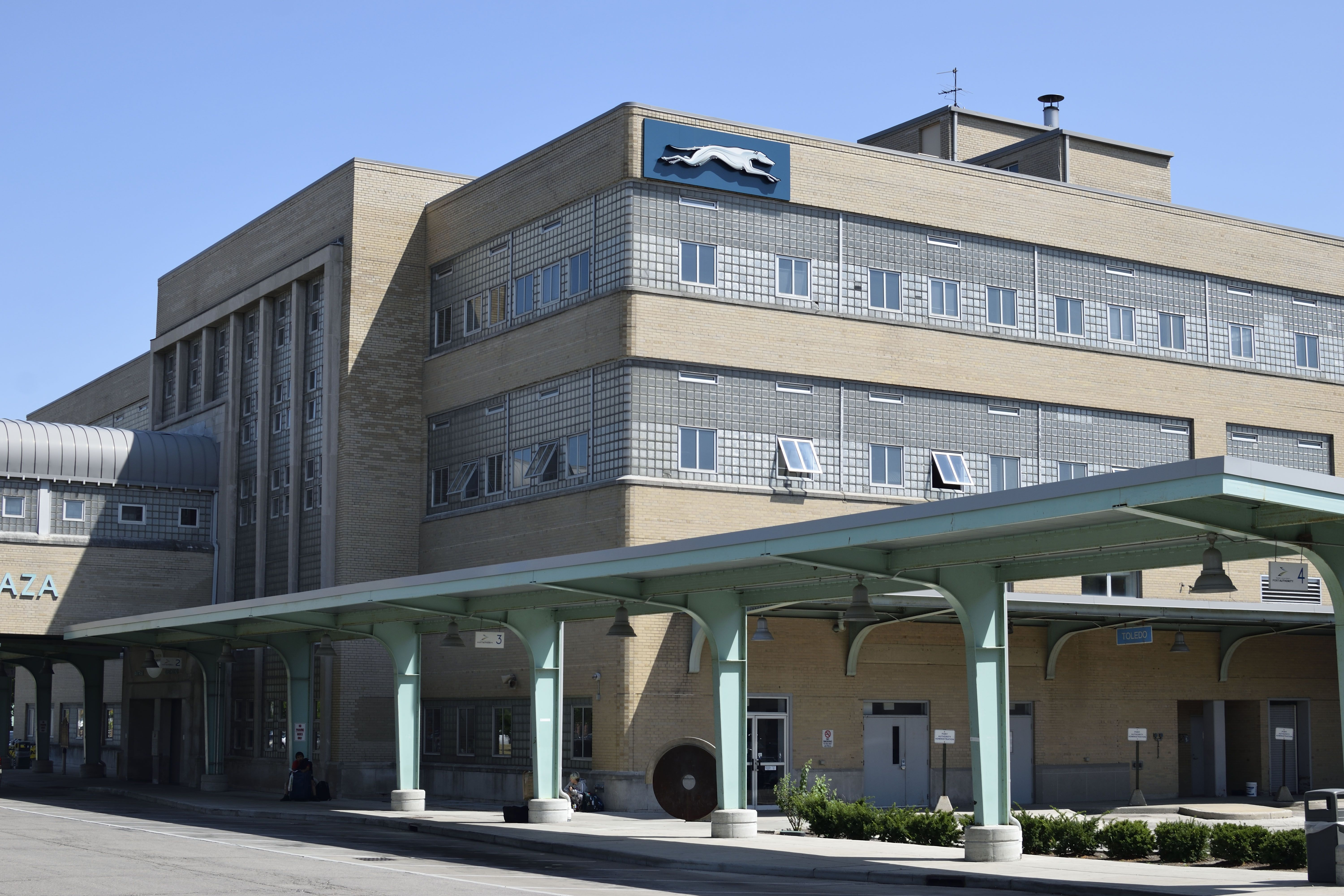
Martin Luther King Jr. Plaza in Toledo, Ohio in 2019

- Toledo: Martin Luther King Jr. Plaza (TOL)
- Sandusky: Sandusky station (SKY)
- Elyria: Elyria station (ELY)
- Cleveland: Cleveland Lakefront Station (CLE)
- Alliance: Alliance station (ALC)

=== Lake Shore Limited (Chicago – Cleveland – Albany – Boston/New York City) ===
- Bryan: Bryan station (BYN)
- Toledo: Martin Luther King Jr. Plaza (TOL)
- Sandusky: Sandusky station (SKY)
- Elyria: Elyria station (ELY)
- Cleveland: Cleveland Lakefront Station (CLE)

== Rail mass transit ==
Cleveland, Ohio has two standard gauge RTA Rapid Transit rail systems, one for heavy-rail and one for three light-rail lines:

== Scenic trains ==
- Ashtabula, Carson & Jefferson Scenic Railroad – Jefferson, Ohio

- Jefferson

- Buckeye Central Scenic Railroad – Hebron, Ohio (defunct; see ZWSR)
- Byesville Scenic Railway – Byesville, Ohio

- Byesville Station
- N Cabin (C&M Crossing)

- Cedar Point & Lake Erie Railroad – Sandusky, Ohio

- Main Station (Funway Station)
- Frontier Town Station
- Boneville Station

- Connotton Valley Railway – Bedford, Ohio

- Bedford Depot

- Cuyahoga Valley Scenic Railroad – Peninsula, Ohio

- Rockside Station
- Canal Visitor Center
- Brecksville Station
- Boston Mill Station
- Peninsula Depot
- Indigo Lake
- Botzum (Indian Mound) Station
- Akron Northside Station
- Howe Meadow
- Canton Lincoln Highway Station

- Hocking Valley Scenic Railway – Nelsonville, Ohio

- Nelsonville Depot
- Haydenville
- Robbins Crossing
- Logan

- Lebanon Mason Monroe Railroad – Lebanon, Ohio

- Lebanon Station
- Southwest Golf Ranch
- Schappacher Farms

- Lorain & West Virginia Railway – Wellington, Ohio
- Minerva Scenic Railway - Minerva, Ohio

- Minerva

- Toledo, Lake Erie and Western Railway – Waterville, Ohio

- Waterville Station

- Zanesville & Western Scenic Railroad – Fultonham, Ohio (former Buckeye Central Scenic Railroad & Glass Rock Line)

== See also ==
- List of historical passenger rail services in Cleveland
- List of railway stations
- Union Station (disambiguation)
