= Sarah Armstrong =

Sarah or Sara Armstrong may refer to:

- Sarah Armstrong (writer) (born 1968), Australian journalist and novelist
- Sarah B. Armstrong (1853–1939), American physician and surgeon
- Sarah Armstrong (fiddler) (1883–1957), American fiddle player and tunesmith
- Sara Garden Armstrong, American artist
- Sarah Armstrong, protagonist of the Sarah Armstrong Mystery series novels

== See also ==
- Sarah Armstrong-Smith, British chief information security officer
