= I-68 (disambiguation) =

I-68 or Interstate 68 is an interstate highway in the U.S. states of West Virginia and Maryland.

I-68 may also refer to:

- I68 (airport) or Lebanon-Warren County Airport, a public airport in Ohio
- Japanese submarine I-68 or Japanese submarine I-168, a Kaidai-class submarine of the Imperial Japanese Navy
