= Ohio State Route 62 =

State Route 62

Route information
- Maintained by ODOT

Location
- Country: United States
- State: Ohio

Highway system
- Ohio State Highway System; Interstate; US; State; Scenic
← US 62	→ SR 63

In Ohio, State Route 62 may refer to:

- U.S. Route 62 in Ohio, the only Ohio highway numbered 62 since about 1932
- Ohio State Route 62 (1923), now SR 19
