= Ohio State Route 122 =

State highway in Ohio, US

State Route 122

Route information
- Maintained by ODOT
- Length: 43.26 mi (69.62 km)
- Existed: 1923–present

Major junctions
- West end: Old SR 122 at the Indiana state line near Boston, IN
- US 35 in Eaton; US 127 in Eaton; I-75 in Middletown
- East end: SR 48/Warren CR 230 near Lebanon, Ohio

Location
- Country: United States
- State: Ohio
- Counties: Preble, Butler, Warren

Highway system
- Ohio State Highway System; Interstate; US; State; Scenic
← SR 121	→ SR 123

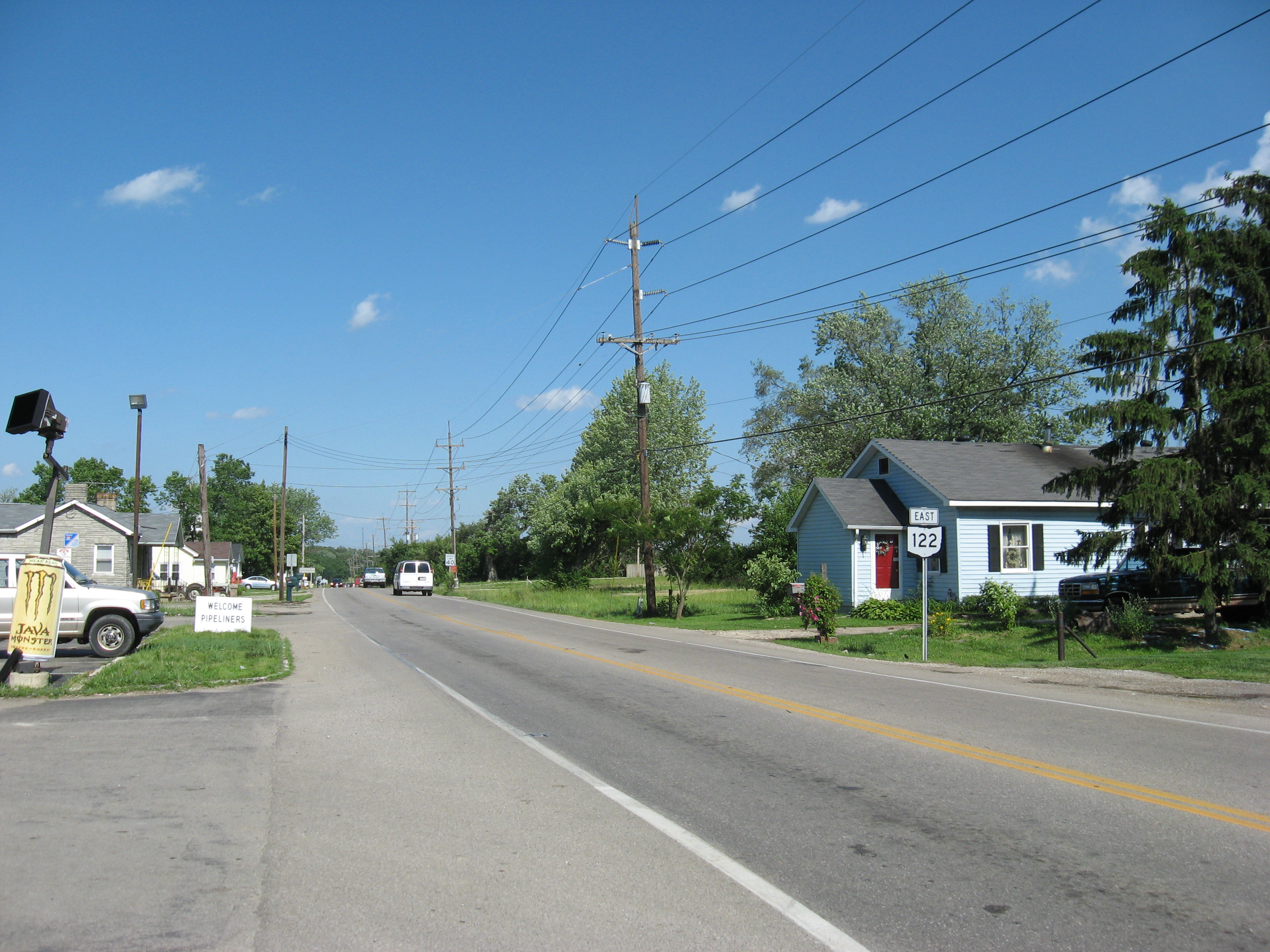
State Route 122 in Red Lion, Ohio.

State Route 122 (SR 122) is an Ohio state highway which runs from the Ohio-Indiana state line in Preble County east of Eaton, Ohio to SR 48 near Lebanon, Ohio, a distance of 43.4 miles (69.8 km). When the route was designated in 1923, it ran along its current route from Indiana to Middletown. It was extended to its current eastern terminus in 1937 but was extended further east to U.S. Route 42 in 1946. The route was truncated back to SR 48 by 1985 with the former section being renamed "Old State Route 122" and maintained by Warren County as CR 230. The route also used to continue west of the Indiana state line as Indiana State Road 122 west to its terminus at US 27 east of Abington, Indiana.

== Major intersections ==
County	Location	mi	km	Destinations	Notes
Preble	Dixon–Jackson township line	0.00	0.00	Old SR 122 / Stateline Road	Indiana state line
Preble	Eaton	9.20	14.81	US 35 west (Eaton Richmond Pike) – [[, Ohio|]]	Western end of US 35 concurrency
Preble	Eaton	9.46	15.22	US 127 / SR 732 south (Barron Street) to I-70	
Preble	Eaton	9.70	15.61	US 35 east (East Main Street)	Eastern end of US 35 concurrency
Preble	Gratis	18.43	29.66	SR 503 (Ada Doty Street)	
Preble	Gratis	18.55	29.85	SR 725 (South Street)	
Butler	Madison Township	26.84	43.19	SR 744 west – Jacksonburg	Eastern terminus of SR 744
Butler	Middletown	31.42	50.57	SR 4 south / SR 73 west (Verity Parkway / Canal Street)	One-way pair
Butler	Middletown	31.48	50.66	SR 4 / SR 73 (Verity Parkway / Clinton Street)	Southern end of SR 4 northbound / SR 73 eastbound concurrency
Butler	Middletown	31.54	50.76	SR 4 north / SR 73 east (Verity Parkway / Clinton Street) / First Avenue	Northern end of SR 4 northbound / SR 73 eastbound concurrency
Warren	Middletown	36.54– 36.75	58.81– 59.14	I-75 – Cincinnati, Dayton	Exit 32 (I-75)
Warren	Clearcreek Township	40.50	65.18	SR 123 north – Franklin	Western end of SR 123 concurrency
Warren	Clearcreek Township	40.62	65.37	SR 741 – Mason, Springboro	
Warren	Clearcreek Township	40.86	65.76	SR 123 south – Lebanon	Eastern end of SR 123 concurrency
Warren	Clearcreek Township	43.26	69.62	SR 48 / CR 230 (Old SR 122) – Dodds	
1.000 mi = 1.609 km; 1.000 km = 0.621 mi: Concurrency terminus

Westbound directional alternate

The entire route is in Middletown, Butler County.

mi	km	Destinations	Notes
0.00	0.00	SR 122 south (University Boulevard) / First Avenue	
0.29– 0.63	0.47– 1.01	University Boulevard / Reinartz Boulevard / Miami Avenue	Interchange
1.23	1.98	SR 4 / SR 73 (Verity Parkway)	
2.11	3.40	SR 122 (Carmody Boulevard) / Central Avenue	
1.000 mi = 1.609 km; 1.000 km = 0.621 mi
