= Ohio State Route 250 =

State Route 250

Route information
- Maintained by ODOT

Location
- Country: United States
- State: Ohio

Highway system
- Ohio State Highway System; Interstate; US; State; Scenic
← US 250	→ SR 251

In Ohio, State Route 250 may refer to:

- U.S. Route 250 in Ohio, the only Ohio highway numbered 250 since about 1928
- Ohio State Route 250 (1920s), now SR 226
