= Ohio State Route 123 =

State highway in southwestern Ohio, US

State Route 123

Route information
- Maintained by ODOT
- Length: 43.61 mi (70.18 km)
- Existed: 1924–present

Major junctions
- South end: SR 251 near Fayetteville
- US 68 near Blanchester; US 22 / SR 3 in Morrow; I-71 near Lebanon; US 42 / SR 48 / SR 63 in Lebanon; I-75 in Franklin
- North end: SR 4 in Germantown

Location
- Country: United States
- State: Ohio
- Counties: Brown, Clinton, Warren, Montgomery

Highway system
- Ohio State Highway System; Interstate; US; State; Scenic
← SR 122	→ SR 124

State Route 123 (SR 123) is a state highway in southwestern Ohio. The route runs from SR 251 about seven miles (11 km) southeast of Blanchester to Germantown at SR 4, a distance of 43.6 miles (70.2 km). The section of road from Franklin to Lebanon was originally a toll road until it was taken over by Warren County and made free for public use.

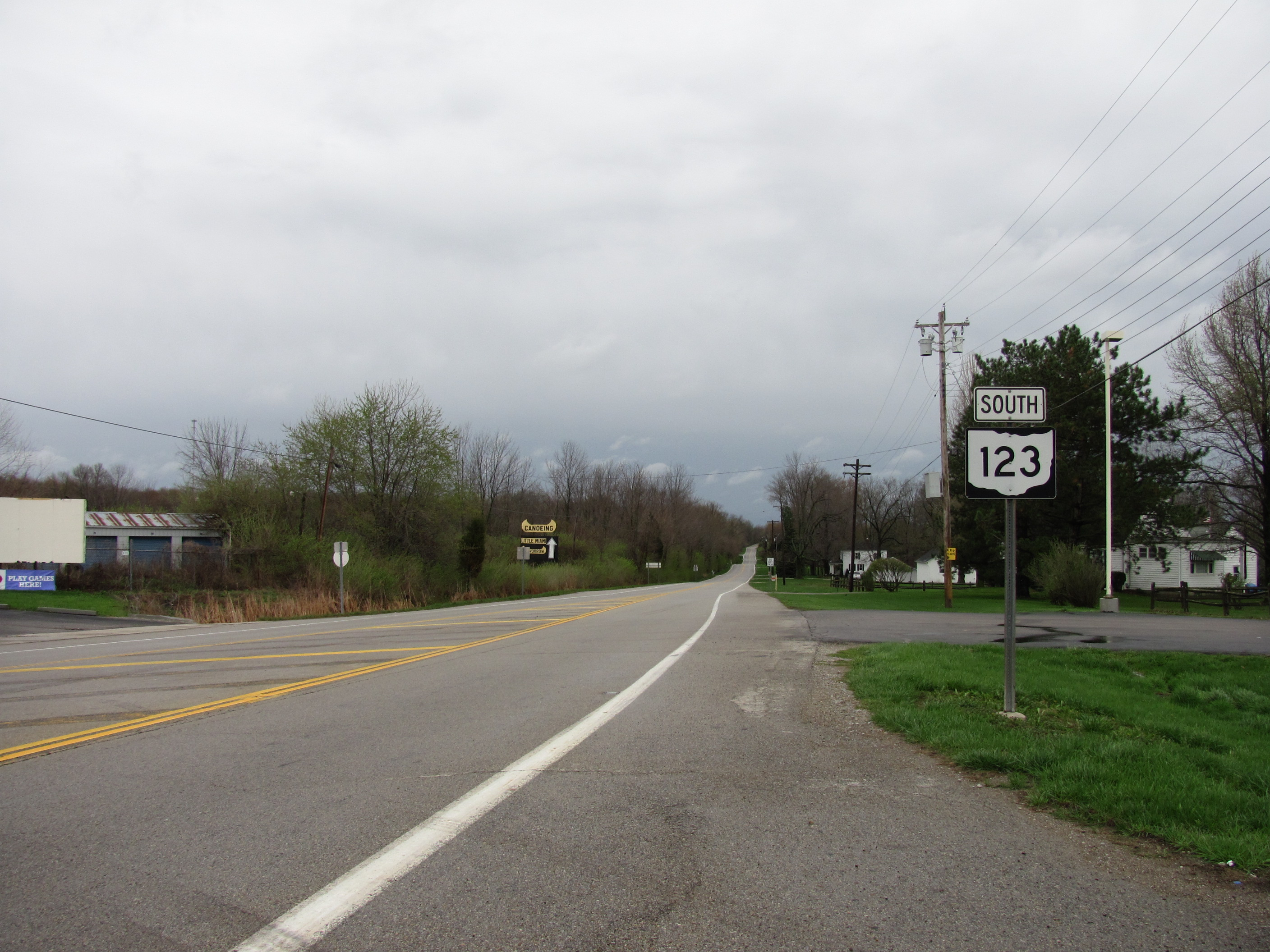
Southbound in Lebanon, Ohio

== Landmarks ==
Ohio Historical Marker #2-14 is located on State Route 123 near Blanchester. It commemorates the Garrison Corner Community which was settled by Lemuel Garrison, Sr., and included a school and cemetery.

== History ==
In Lebanon, SR 123 was rerouted to a new roadway, which the city of Lebanon has called "Neil Armstrong Way", from SR 63's (Main Street) intersection with Glosser Road to SR 123's existing intersection with Hart Road. Armstrong for many years owned a farm along SR 123 between Lebanon and the community of Red Lion. The road opened on October 7, 2014. There are also plans to introduce a bill in the state senate to apply the name "Neil Armstrong Way" to the entire stretch of SR 123 from Lebanon to Red Lion.

== Major intersections ==
County	Location	mi	km	Destinations	Notes
Brown	Perry Township	0.00	0.00	SR 251	
Brown	Perry Township	0.76	1.22	US 68 – Fayetteville	
Clinton	Blanchester	6.91	11.12	SR 133 south (Bourbon Street) – Stonelick State Park, Williamsburg	Southern end of SR 133 concurrency
Clinton	Blanchester	7.03	11.31	SR 28 east (Main Street) / SR 133 north (Broadway Street)	Northern end of SR 133 concurrency; southern end of SR 28 concurrency
Warren	Harlan Township	7.98	12.84	SR 28 west – Milford	Northern end of SR 28 concurrency
Warren	Harlan Township	12.61	20.29	SR 132 – Butlerville, Clarksville	
Warren	Salem Township	15.64	25.17	US 22 east / SR 3 north / Whitacre Drive	Southern end of US 22 / SR 3 concurrency
Warren	Morrow	17.37	27.95	US 22 west / SR 3 south (Pike Street)	Northern end of US 22 / SR 3 concurrency
Warren	Turtle Creek Township	22.73	36.58	SR 350 east / Phillips Road – Fort Ancient	Western terminus of SR 350
Warren	Turtle Creek Township	22.82– 23.00	36.73– 37.01	I-71 – Columbus, Cincinnati	Exit 32 (I-71)
Warren	Lebanon	25.38– 25.53	40.85– 41.09	SR 48 south / SR 48T north to US 42 north	Interchange; southern end of SR 48 concurrency; southern terminus of unsigned SR 48T
Warren	Lebanon	26.44	42.55	US 42 / SR 48 north (Broadway) / SR 63 begins	Northern end of SR 48 concurrency; eastern terminus of SR 63
Warren	Lebanon	27.33	43.98	SR 63 west (Main Street) / Glosser Road	Northern end of SR 63 concurrency
Warren	Clearcreek Township	31.95	51.42	SR 122 east	Southern end of SR 122 concurrency
Warren	Clearcreek Township	32.19	51.80	SR 741 – Springboro, Mason	
Warren	Clearcreek Township	32.14	51.72	SR 122 west – Middletown	Northern end of SR 122 concurrency
Warren	Franklin	36.50– 36.59	58.74– 58.89	I-75 – Dayton, Cincinnati	Exit 36 (I-75)
Warren	Franklin	37.80	60.83	SR 73 west (South River Street)	Southern end of SR 73 concurrency (on one-way pair)
Warren	Franklin	38.15	61.40	SR 73 east (Second Street)	Northern end of SR 73 concurrency (on one-way pair)
Montgomery	German Township	43.61	70.18	SR 4 – Middletown, Germantown, Dayton	
1.000 mi = 1.609 km; 1.000 km = 0.621 mi: Concurrency terminus
