= Lebanon Mason and Monroe Railroad =

Coordinates: 39°25′55″N 84°12′30″W

Lebanon Mason Monroe Railroad
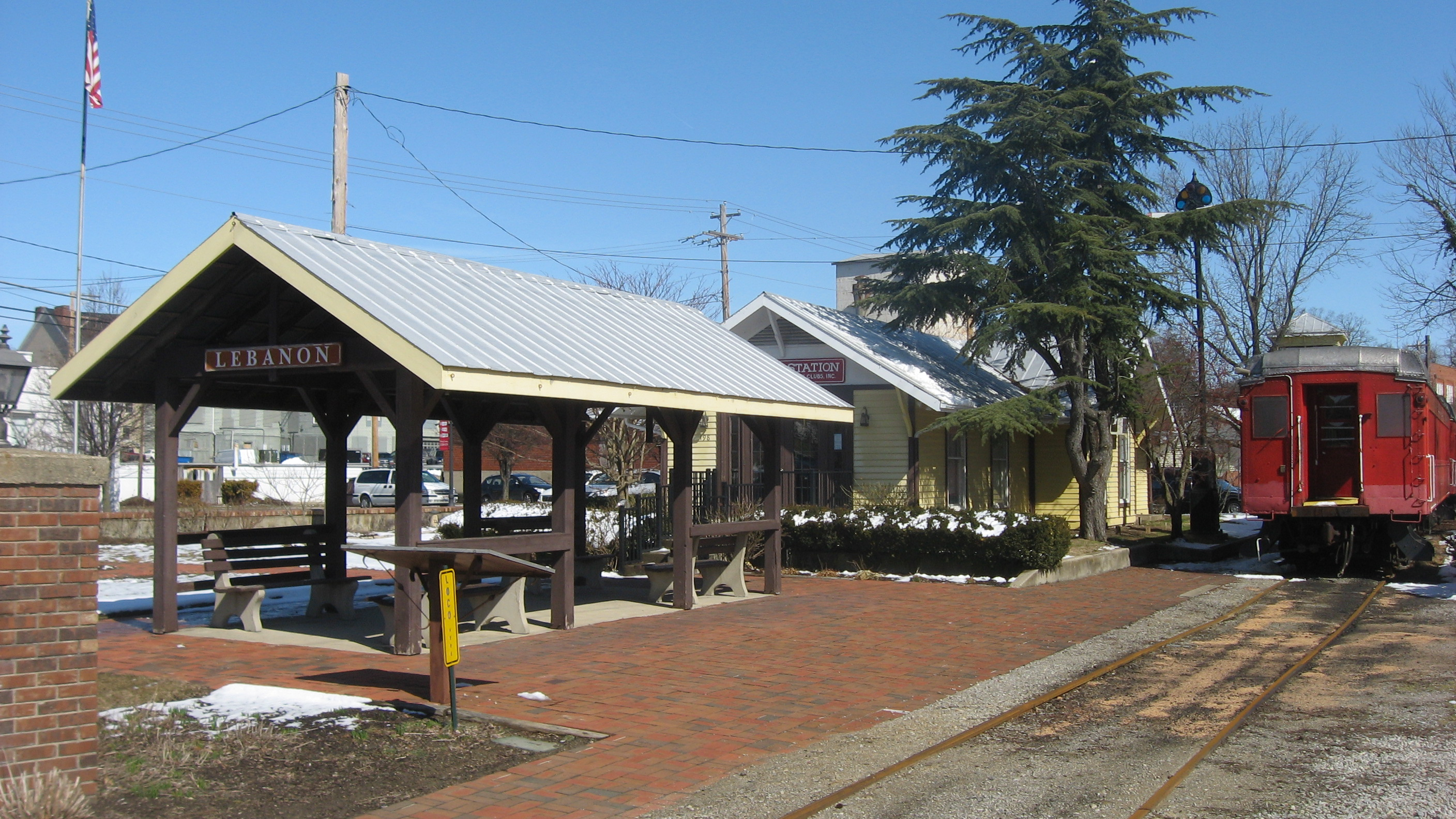
- Lebanon Mason Monroe Railroad Depot

Overview
- Headquarters: Lebanon, Ohio
- Reporting mark: CRC
- Locale: Warren County, Ohio, USA
- Dates of operation: 1985–present

Technical
- Track gauge: 4 ft 8 1/2 in (1,435 mm) standard gauge

Other
- Website: lebanonrr.com

The Lebanon Mason & Monroe Railroad (LM&M Railroad) is a heritage railroad in Ohio. It offers passenger rides out of its depot in Lebanon, Ohio.

== Route history ==
The train operates on approximately 25 miles (40 km) of track between Lebanon, Mason and Monroe – all cities in southwestern Ohio. For most trips the LM&M runs 4.4 miles (7.1 km) south from Lebanon Station in downtown historic Lebanon to Hageman Junction. The train runs along the right-of-way of the Cincinnati, Lebanon and Northern Railway (CL&N), a historic passenger and freight line that began operation in 1881 with narrow gauge track (3 ft (914 mm) between the rails). Three years later it was rebuilt to standard gauge. The CL&N was later acquired by the Pennsylvania Railroad (PRR) that operated both freight and passenger trains over the line between Dayton and Cincinnati. The passenger service over this line was primarily commuter trains that took people who lived in Warren County to jobs in Blue Ash, Norwood, Cincinnati and Dayton. The PRR discontinued Cincinnati passenger service over this line in 1931 after the opening of Cincinnati Union Terminal.

Continuity of the original right-of-way between Lebanon and Cincinnati was broken when interstate highway I-71 was constructed during the 1960s. Segments of the original CL&N/PRR trackage are still in operation as of 2008. The LM&M's track from Lebanon to Hageman Junction is currently owned by the city of Lebanon and Genesee & Wyoming (current owner of the Indiana and Ohio Railway) owns the remaining track. While the I&O continued to operate freight over the entire line, with the LM&M having trackage rights to operate passenger trains, in 2021 the I&O officially ended their status as designated operator of the Lebanon Branch, being replaced by CRC/LM&M.

== See also ==
- List of Ohio train stations
- Rail transport
- Warren County, Ohio
