= Ohio State Route 741 =

State highway in southwestern Ohio, US

State Route 741

Route information
- Maintained by ODOT
- Length: 27.567 mi (44.365 km)
- Existed: 1938–present

Major junctions
- south end: I-71 near Kings Mills
- US 42 in Mason
- north end: I-75 in Moraine

Location
- Country: United States
- State: Ohio
- Counties: Warren, Montgomery

Highway system
- Ohio State Highway System; Interstate; US; State; Scenic
← SR 739	→ SR 743

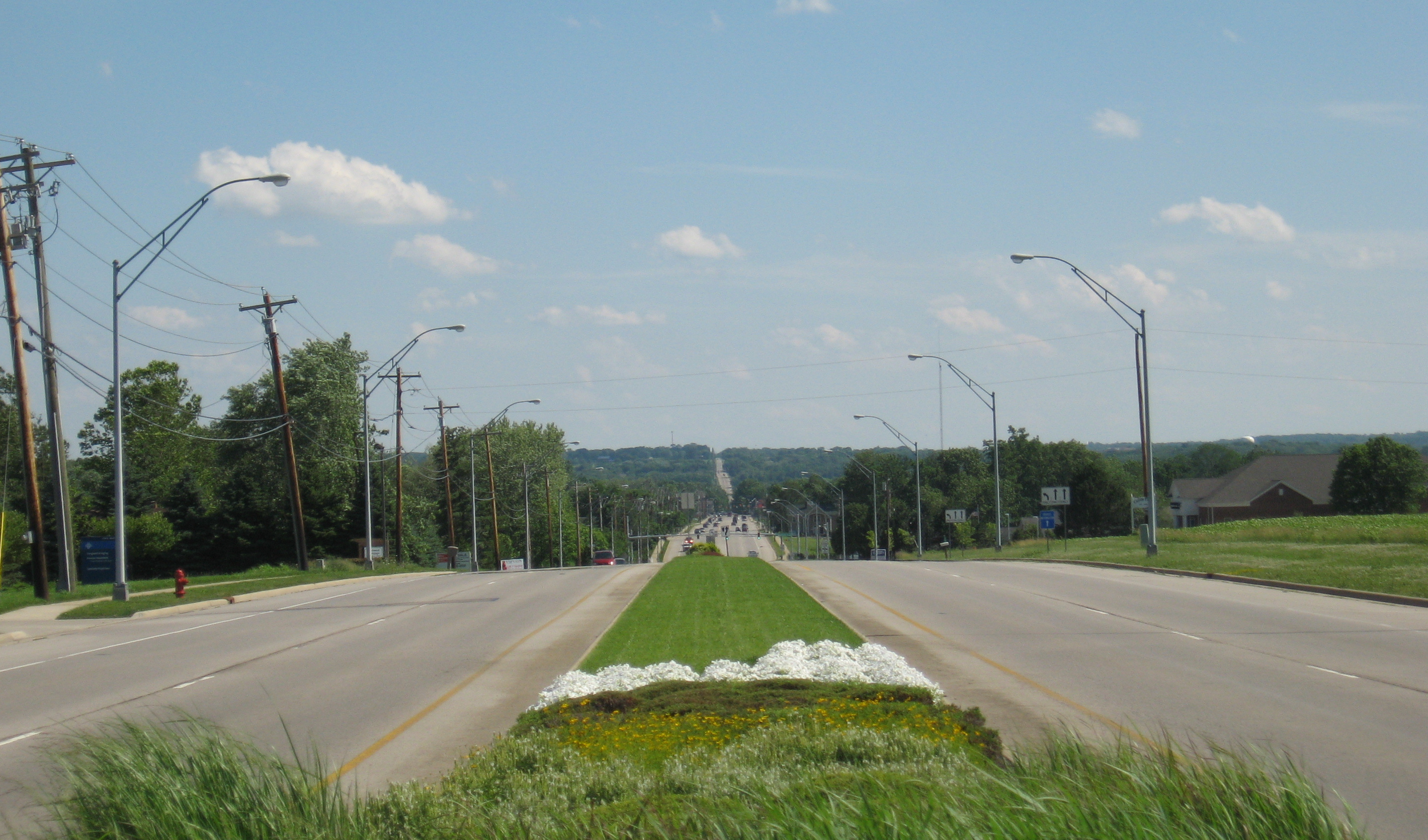
State Route 741 passing through Springboro, Ohio.

State Route 741 (SR 741) is a north–south state highway in the southwest portion of the U.S. state of Ohio. The southern terminus of the route is at a diamond interchange with I-71 at its Exit 25 near Kings Mills, adjacent to the Kings Island Amusement Park. State Route 741’s northern terminus is at a partial interchange with I-75 at its Exit 50B in Moraine, just south of Dayton.

Created in the late 1930s, State Route 741 passes through the counties of Warren and Montgomery. The portion of State Route 741 in Montgomery County is also called Springboro Pike.

== Route description ==
State Route 741's routing takes it through Warren and Montgomery Counties. No portion of the state route is included within the National Highway System, a system of routes deemed most important for the nation's economy, mobility and defense.

== History ==
When it was formed in 1938, State Route 741 was originally routed from its junction with U.S. Route 42 near Mason to its intersection with the former U.S. Route 25 (now Dixie Drive) near West Carrollton. By 1971, State Route 741 was extended north along Springboro Pike from Dixie Drive up to its current northern terminus at Interstate 75 in Moraine. In 1985, the highway would be lengthened again, this time on the south end. From U.S. Route 42, State Route 741 was extended south and east to Exit 25 off of I-71 near Kings Mills, which marks the route's present-day southern terminus.

On June 4, 2010, a continuous-flow intersection (CFI), the first of its kind in Ohio, was built at SR 741 and Austin Boulevard (the former Miamisburg-Springboro Pike/Austin Pike) in southern Montgomery County. The intersection was built in conjunction with the addition of a nearby interchange between I-75 and Austin Boulevard. By 2012, congestion at the new intersection had led to calls for improvements. It is a matter of dispute whether the problems were caused by faulty traffic projections, too much development around the interchange or the fact that a "two leg" CFI was built, rather than a full "four leg" CFI. There are some suggestions that a full CFI was not built in order to allow land which would have been used for right-of-way to instead be retained by developers. As of early 2012, the solution to the traffic problems was also a matter of debate.

== Major intersections ==
County	Location	mi	km	Destinations	Notes
Warren	Deerfield Township	0.00	0.00	I-71 / Kings Mills Road – Cincinnati, Columbus	Southern terminus of SR 741; road continues as Kings Mills Road; Exit 25 on I-71
Warren	Mason	2.491	4.009	US 42	
Warren	Turtlecreek Township	6.958	11.198	SR 63 to I-75 – Monroe, Lebanon	
Warren	Clearcreek Township	11.151	17.946	SR 122 / SR 123 – Franklin, Middletown	
Warren	Springboro	15.822	25.463	SR 73 (W Central Avenue)	
Montgomery	Miami Township	18.546	29.847	Austin Boulevard to I-75	Two leg continuous-flow intersection (from Austin Boulevard to SR 741)
Montgomery	Miamisburg	21.442	34.508	SR 725 (Miamisburg-Centerville Road) to I-75	
Montgomery	Moraine	27.567	44.365	I-75 north / North Springboro Pike – Dayton	Northern terminus of SR 741; road continues as North Springboro Pike; I-75 northbound entrance / I-75 southbound exit only; Exit 50B on I-75
1.000 mi = 1.609 km; 1.000 km = 0.621 mi: Incomplete access
