= Byesville Scenic Railway =

Railway line in the United States of America

Coordinates: 39°58′08″N 81°32′15″W

Overview
- Headquarters: Byesville, Ohio
- Locale: Guernsey County, Ohio, USA
- Dates of operation: 2006–2011

Technical
- Track gauge: 4 ft 8 1/2 in (1,435 mm) standard gauge

Byesville Scenic Railway is a tourist railroad located in Byesville, Ohio. Service was suspended in 2011, and as of late 2021 has not resumed.

The railway is a non-profit group dedicated to preserving the local coal mining and railroad history in Guernsey County, Ohio, United States. The railroad runs on track that was originally known as the Cleveland & Marietta Railroad and later became part of the Pennsylvania Railroad. The primary freight hauled was coal, as Guernsey County was a large producer of coal. It later became part of the Penn Central Railroad due to a merger of the Pennsylvania and New York Central and later Conrail.

In the early 1980s most of the C&M was removed, the remaining portion from Cambridge to C&M Junction (just south of Derwent) was sold to the Chessie System (which later became CSX Transportation). Guernsey County purchased Byesville to C&M Junction in 1999 which lay dormant until 2003 when the Buckeye Central Scenic Railroad began operating a tourist train from Byesville, Ohio to Derwent. In 2006, the newly formed Byesville Scenic Railway (BSRW) began operations and has continued the rehabilitation of line to C&M Junction. BSRW plans call for the rebuilding the old B&O Eastern Ohio branch to Cumberland, Ohio
