= Ohio State Route 251 =

State highway in southwestern Ohio, US

State Route 251

Route information
- Maintained by ODOT
- Length: 4.81 mi (7.74 km)
- Existed: 1925–present

Major junctions
- South end: US 50 near St. Martin
- North end: US 68 near St. Martin

Location
- Country: United States
- State: Ohio
- Counties: Brown, Clinton

Highway system
- Ohio State Highway System; Interstate; US; State; Scenic
← SR 250	→ SR 252

State Route 251 (SR 251) is a north–south state highway located in the southwestern portion of the U.S. state of Ohio. Its southern terminus is at U.S. Route 50 (US 50) about one mile (1.6 km) south of St. Martin in northern Brown County. The northern terminus of SR 251 is at US 68 nearly two and a half miles (4.0 km) northwest of St. Martin in southwestern Clinton County.

== Route description ==
The path of SR 251 takes it through northern Brown County and southwestern Clinton County. SR 251 is not included as a component of the National Highway System.

== History ==
When it was designated in 1925, SR 251 was routed along what is now US 68 between US 50 in Fayetteville and the current northern terminus of SR 251 south of St. Martin. US 68's predecessor, SR 53, concurrent with US 50 east to the current southern terminus of SR 251, and then followed the entire present alignment of SR 251 before resuming its northward path along the current alignment of US 68. In 1930, SR 251 and SR 53 swapped alignments, such that SR 53 now followed a straight alignment north out of Fayetteville that US 68 utilizes today, and SR 251 now appeared along its present-day routing.

== Major intersections ==
County	Location	mi	km	Destinations	Notes
Brown	Perry Township	0.00	0.00	US 50 / Murray Corner Road	
Brown	Perry Township	2.64	4.25	SR 123	Southern terminus of SR 123
Clinton	Jefferson Township	4.81	7.74	US 68 – Fayetteville, Wilmington	
1.000 mi = 1.609 km; 1.000 km = 0.621 mi
