= Sarah Armstrong (fiddler) =

- Born: March 18, 1883
- Died: August 12, 1957 (aged 74)
- Genre: Old-time
- Instrument: Fiddle

Sarah Armstrong (March 18, 1883 – August 12, 1957) was a fiddle player and tunesmith from Pennsylvania. She left behind many fiddle tunes that are still widely played today.

== Biography ==
Armstrong was born Sarah Gray on March 18, 1883 in Pennsylvania into a musical family. Many of her relatives were part of a band called the Gray Boys. They often hosted dances during which they played music for friends and family. Sarah's Uncle Laney, being the most successful of all the Grays, began teaching her to play the fiddle when she was just five years old. In 1899, Sarah married Charles Armstrong, who also had a love of music. They taught their children to play music, although none carried the tradition into their adult lives.

In November 1943, Samuel Bayard, a professor at Penn State visited Armstrong twice. During these visits, he transcribed nearly 40 of her tunes by ear. These tunes would eventually become part of a book Bayard put together called Hill Country Tunes (1944), and they reappeared in another book he published called Dance to the Fiddle, March to the Fife. These books are not only collections of tunes, but also accounts of what Bayard's visits were like. While many of Armstrong's tunes were learned from her family, her versions were more reliable than those Bayard had collected earlier from her uncle Abraham. As Bayard records in his notes for No. 30 in Hill Country Tunes, Armstrong explained how Abraham got his tunes “all mixed up” late in life and did not play them the same way as when he was younger.
