= Ohio State Route 63 =

State highway in southwestern Ohio, US

State Route 63

Route information
- Maintained by ODOT
- Length: 11.74 mi (18.89 km)
- Existed: 1927–present

Major junctions
- West end: SR 4 near Monroe
- I-75 near Monroe
- East end: US 42 / SR 48 / SR 123 in Lebanon

Location
- Country: United States
- State: Ohio
- Counties: Butler, Warren

Highway system
- Ohio State Highway System; Interstate; US; State; Scenic
← SR 62	→ SR 64

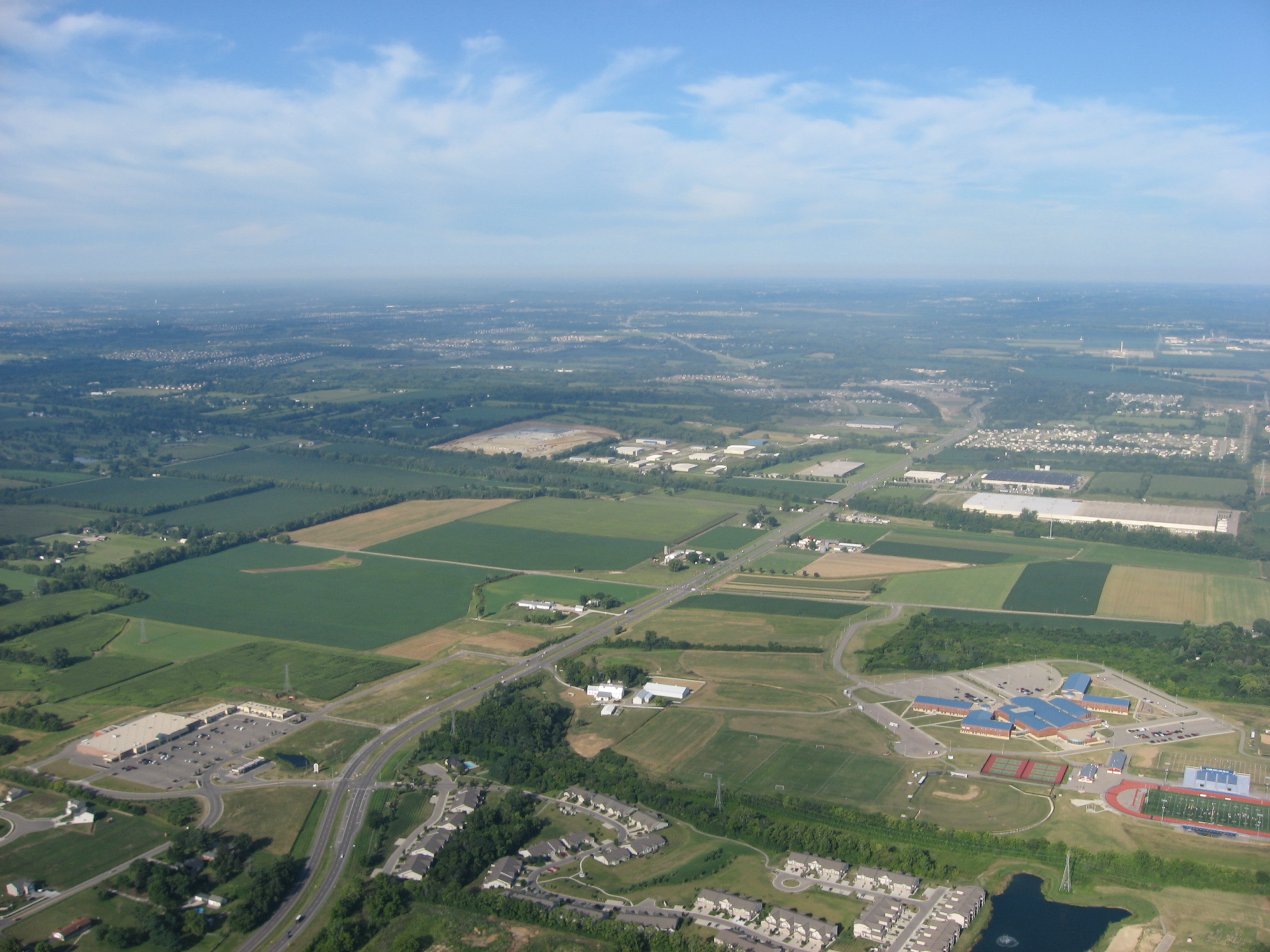
State Route 63 toward its western end

State Route 63 (SR 63) is a 11.74-mile (18.89 km) long east–west state highway located in the southwestern portion of the U.S. state of Ohio. The western terminus of SR 63 is at a trumpet interchange with SR 4 on the western outskirts of Monroe. Its eastern terminus is at a signalized intersection with US 42, SR 48 and SR 123 in downtown Lebanon.

The westernmost portion of SR 63 between SR 4 and I-75 is a four-lane divided highway. It is signed as Hamilton–Lebanon Road. From I-75 east to downtown Lebanon, SR 63 is a two-lane route that is signed as Main Street. Before the construction of the SR 129 freeway between Hamilton and I-75, SR 63 in combination with SR 4 provided the quickest connection between Hamilton and Lebanon.

== Route description ==
Along the way, SR 63 travels through northeastern Butler County and northwestern Warren County. No part of SR 63 is included within the National Highway System (NHS). The NHS is a network of highways defined as being most important for the economy, mobility and defense of the country.

Ohio State Route 63 is a short east–west highway located roughly halfway between Dayton and Cincinnati. It runs west from Lebanon through Warren and Butler counties. The route begins in downtown Lebanon at the intersection with U.S. Route 42, where Ohio State Route 123 also joins briefly. Shortly afterward, State Route 123 turns north, and State Route 63 continues west on its own. The highway then reaches an interchange with Interstate 75 and continues through the city of Monroe. State Route 63 ends on the west side of Monroe at a trumpet interchange with Ohio State Route 4.

== History ==
SR 63 was established in 1927. Throughout its history, SR 63 has been designated along the same stretch of highway through portions of Butler and Warren Counties, replacing what had been known as SR 125 prior to 1927.

Since its inception, the only major change along the routing of SR 63 is that by 1969, the highway was upgraded from a two-lane route to a four-lane divided highway between SR 4 and I-75.

== Major intersections ==
County	Location	mi	km	Destinations	Notes
Butler	Monroe	0.00	0.00	SR 4 – Middletown, Hamilton	Interchange
Warren	Monroe	4.84	7.79	I-75 – Cincinnati, Dayton	Exit 29 (I-75)
Warren	Turtle Creek Township	7.91	12.73	SR 741 – Mason, Springboro	
Warren	Lebanon	11.74	18.89	US 42 / SR 48 / SR 123 (Broadway / Main Street)	
1.000 mi = 1.609 km; 1.000 km = 0.621 mi
