= Sarah B. Armstrong =

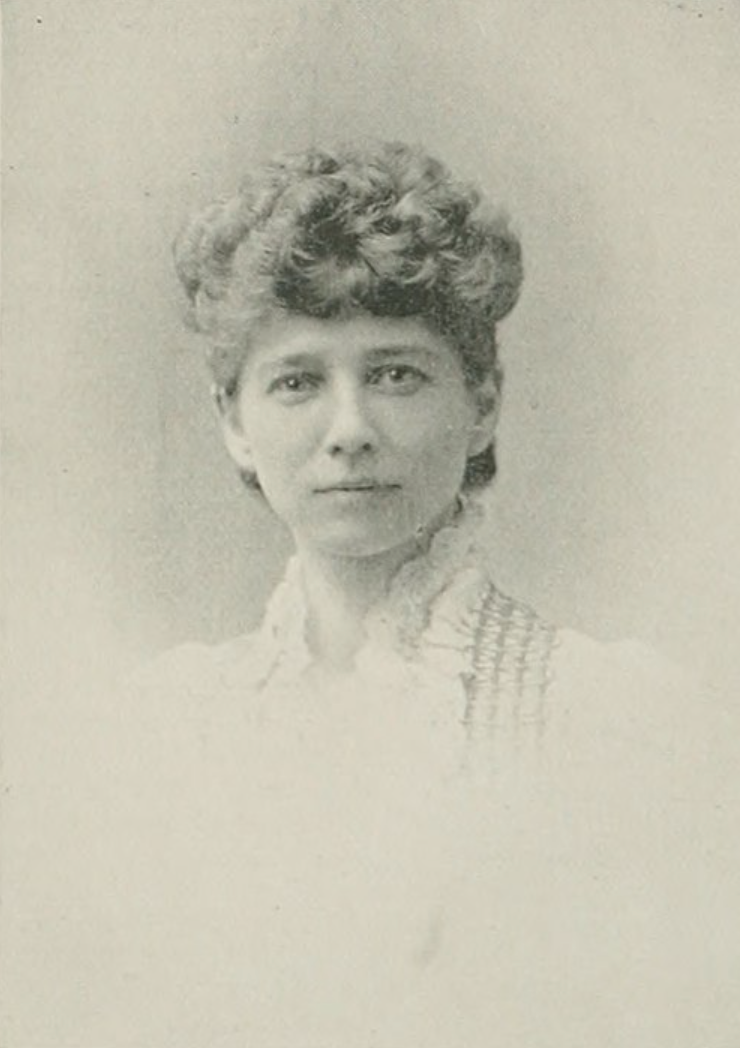
- Born: July 31, 1853; Newton, Ohio
- Died: July 16, 1939 (aged 85); Los Angeles, California
- Education: Lebanon University, Ohio
- Occupations: Physician and surgeon

Dr. Sarah B. Armstrong (July 31, 1853–July 16, 1939) was an American physician and surgeon.

== Early life and education ==
Armstrong was born on July 31, 1857, in Newton, Ohio, near Cincinnati. Her parents, Mary and Eliob Armstrong, were farmers. She had a brother who was two years younger than her. Armstrong attended public schools in Cincinnati until her family moved to Lebanon, Ohio in 1865. In 1870, she lived with her widowed mother, Mary, and her brother William. (Note: Three other people from 12 to 22 lived with them, and were attending school.)

Her maternal great-grandmother was the first woman to practice medicine west of the Alleghany mountains.

She studied at the university in town, and at 16, she became a teacher. She graduated with the highest honors from Lebanon University in 1880 with a Bachelor of Science degree.

== Career ==
Armstrong was employed by Lebanon University in 1883; she was a teacher and the head of the art department. Meanwhile, she completed the classical course and received a Bachelor of Arts (BA) degree in 1887. She received an honorary Master of Arts (MA) degree.

She received a degree in medicine in 1886. She continued to teach while also working as the physician and matron of the school. From 1888 through 1889, she studied medicine and was the assistant to the chair of theory and practice at the Homeopathic College of Michigan in Ann Arbor, Michigan. She received her post-graduate degree in 1889. After working for a short period of time as a member of the medical faculty of Lebanon University, she resigned and went to New York, where for one year she made a special study of surgery.

On January 1, 1891, Armstrong moved to Bay City, Michigan, where she opened a medical practice. She sat on the school board in 1891. By 1898, she was secretary of an association of women physicians organized in Chicago.

She died on July 16, 1939, in Los Angeles, California.

== Personal life ==
Armstrong attended Baptist Church in Bay City, where she was a soprano singer and musician. She was a poet.
