= Lebanon, Ohio =

- City
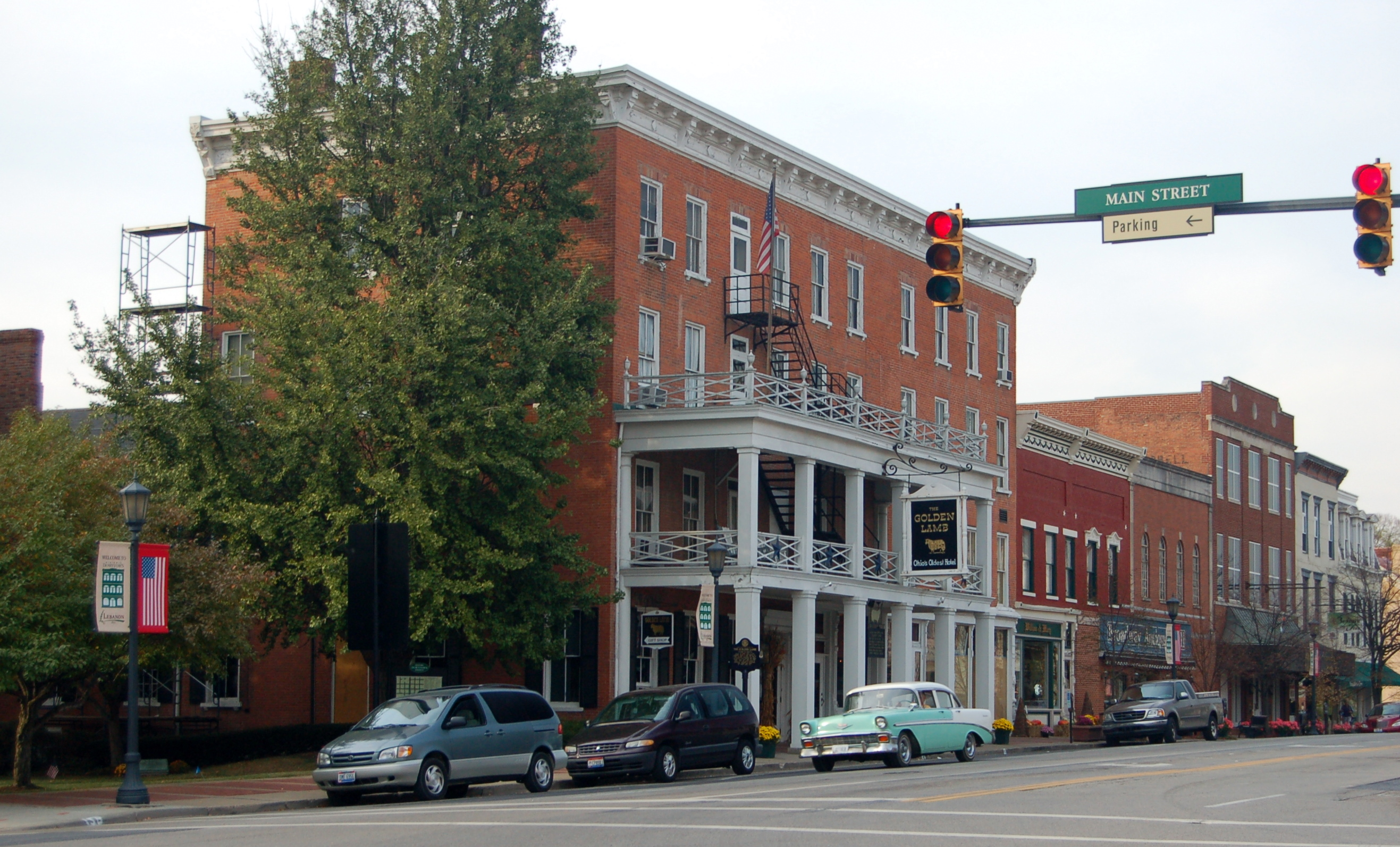
- Golden Lamb Inn looking down Broadway Street
- Interactive map of Lebanon, Ohio
- Location within Ohio Location within the United States
- Coordinates: 39°25′00″N 84°14′28″W
- Country: United States
- State: Ohio
- County: Warren

Area
  - Total: 13.19 sq mi (34.15 km^{2})
  - Land: 13.18 sq mi (34.13 km^{2})
  - Water: 0.0077 sq mi (0.02 km^{2})
- Elevation: 748 ft (228 m)

Population (2020)
  - Total: 20,841
  - Density: 1,581.7/sq mi (610.68/km^{2})
- Time zone: UTC-5 (Eastern (EST))
  - Summer (DST): UTC-4 (EDT)
- ZIP code: 45036
- Area code: 513
- FIPS code: 39-42364
- GNIS feature ID: 1087116
- Website: City website

Lebanon is a city in Warren County, Ohio, United States, and its county seat. The population was 20,841 at the 2020 census. It is part of the Cincinnati metropolitan area.

== History ==
Lebanon is in the Symmes Purchase. The first European settler in what is now Lebanon was Ichabod Corwin, uncle of Ohio Governor Thomas Corwin, who came to Ohio from Bourbon County, Kentucky, and settled on the north branch of Turtle Creek in March 1796. The site of his cabin is now on the grounds of Berry Intermediate School on North Broadway and is marked with a monument erected by the Warren County Historical Society.

The town was laid out in September 1802 on land owned by Ichabod Corwin, Silas Hurin, Ephraim Hathaway, and Samuel Manning in Sections 35 and 35 of Town 5, Range 3 North and Sections 5 and 6 of Town 4, Range 3 North of the Between the Miami Rivers Survey. Lebanon was named after the Biblical Lebanon because of the many juniper or Eastern Red cedar trees there, similar to the Lebanon Cedar. It is known today as "The Cedar City".

City legend has it that Lebanon didn't grow as large as Cincinnati or Dayton because of the 'Shaker Curse'. During their migration, the Shakers decided an area outside of town was a suitable place for them to create a homeland for themselves. There was a disagreement with some of the locals and it was said the Shakers placed a curse on the city to hinder the city's prosperity. In reality, the Shakers thrived in the area, and built a settlement about 4 miles (6.4 km) west of Lebanon called Union Village. A local man, Malchalm Worley was their first convert. Since the Shakers did not engage in procreation, they relied on converts to increase their numbers. By 1900, there were almost no Shakers left in Ohio.

In 1973, Lebanon withdrew from Turtlecreek Township by forming a paper township.

The city is one of the few in the nation to once operate a government-run cable television and telephone service, as well as being a fiber-to-the-neighborhood Internet service provider. Controversial since it began operation in 1999, the Lebanon telecommunications system had struggled to recover its expenses and had accumulated over $8 million in debt. However, residents in the area at the time paid up to 50% less for the aforementioned services than neighboring communities, therefore saving over $40 million of the residents' money. In the 2006 general election, however, voters approved the sale of this city-run telecommunications system to Cincinnati Bell.

== Geography ==
According to the United States Census Bureau, the city has a total area of 12.97 square miles (33.59 km^{2}), of which 12.96 square miles (33.57 km^{2}) is land and 0.01 square miles (0.03 km^{2}) is water.

== Demographics ==
Historical population
Census	Pop.	Note	%±
1820	1,079		—
1830	1,165		8.0%
1840	1,528		31.2%
1850	2,088		36.6%
1860	2,559		22.6%
1870	2,749		7.4%
1880	2,703		−1.7%
1890	3,050		12.8%
1900	2,867		−6.0%
1910	2,698		−5.9%
1920	3,396		25.9%
1930	3,222		−5.1%
1940	3,896		20.9%
1950	4,818		23.7%
1960	5,993		24.4%
1970	7,934		32.4%
1980	9,620		21.3%
1990	10,453		8.7%
2000	16,962		62.3%
2010	20,033		18.1%
2020	20,841		4.0%

=== 2020 census ===
As of the 2020 census, Lebanon had a population of 20,841. The median age was 37.6 years. 26.1% of residents were under the age of 18 and 14.4% of residents were 65 years of age or older. For every 100 females there were 94.0 males, and for every 100 females age 18 and over there were 90.9 males age 18 and over.

98.9% of residents lived in urban areas, while 1.1% lived in rural areas.

There were 8,075 households in Lebanon, of which 34.7% had children under the age of 18 living in them. Of all households, 47.8% were married-couple households, 16.9% were households with a male householder and no spouse or partner present, and 28.6% were households with a female householder and no spouse or partner present. About 27.2% of all households were made up of individuals and 10.8% had someone living alone who was 65 years of age or older.

There were 8,361 housing units, of which 3.4% were vacant. The homeowner vacancy rate was 0.9% and the rental vacancy rate was 2.6%.

Racial composition as of the 2020 census
Race	Number	Percent
White	18,343	88.0%
Black or African American	577	2.8%
American Indian and Alaska Native	50	0.2%
Asian	224	1.1%
Native Hawaiian and Other Pacific Islander	0	0.0%
Some other race	395	1.9%
Two or more races	1,252	6.0%
Hispanic or Latino (of any race)	972	4.7%

=== 2010 census ===
As of the census of 2010, there were 20,033 people, 7,436 households, and 5,213 families living in the city. The population density was 1,545.8 inhabitants per square mile (596.8/km^{2}). There were 7,920 housing units at an average density of 611.1 units per square mile (235.9 units/km^{2}). The racial makeup of the city was 92.7% White, 2.6% African American, 0.2% Native American, 0.8% Asian, 1.6% from other races, and 2.0% from two or more races. Hispanic or Latino of any race were 3.5% of the population.

There were 7,436 households, of which 41.2% had children under the age of 18 living with them, 51.3% were married couples living together, 13.5% had a female householder with no husband present, 5.3% had a male householder with no wife present, and 29.9% were non-families. 24.4% of all households were made up of individuals, and 7.9% had someone living alone who was 65 years of age or older. The average household size was 2.62 and the average family size was 3.12.

The median age in the city was 34.7 years. 29.2% of residents were under the age of 18; 7.3% were between the ages of 18 and 24; 29.5% were from 25 to 44; 23.9% were from 45 to 64; and 10.1% were 65 years of age or older. The gender makeup of the city was 49.0% male and 51.0% female.

=== 2000 census ===
As of the census of 2000, there were 16,962 people living in the city. The population density was 1,440.6 inhabitants per square mile (556.2/km^{2}). There were 6,218 housing units at an average density of 528.1 units per square mile (203.9 units/km^{2}). The racial makeup of the city was 90.98% White, 6.36% African American, 0.32% Native American, 0.64% Asian, 0.02% Pacific Islander, 0.37% from other races, and 1.31% from two or more races. Hispanic or Latino of any race were 1.13% of the population.

There were 5,887 households, out of which 40.7% had children under the age of 18 living with them, 54.8% were married couples living together, 12.9% had a female householder with no husband present, and 28.5% were non-families. 24.3% of all households were made up of individuals, and 8.6% had someone living alone who was 65 years of age or older. The average household size was 2.58 and the average family size was 3.08.

In the city, the population was spread out, with 27.2% under the age of 18, 10.3% from 18 to 24, 36.8% from 25 to 44, 16.8% from 45 to 64, and 8.9% who were 65 years of age or older. The median age was 32 years. For every 100 females, there were 110.1 males. For every 100 females age 18 and over, there were 114.1 males.

The median income for a household in the city was $46,856, and the median income for a family was $52,578. Males had a median income of $40,361 versus $27,551 for females. The per capita income for the city was $20,897. About 4.7% of families and 6.4% of the population were below the poverty line, including 6.6% of those under age 18 and 6.3% of those aged 65 or over.

== Economy ==
Prisons operated by the Ohio Department of Corrections in the area include Lebanon Correctional Institution and Warren Correctional Institution.

== Arts and culture ==
=== Events ===
- Lebanon Blues Festival
- Lebanon Country Music Festival
- Warren County Fair
- Country Applefest
- Horse Drawn Carriage Parade and Christmas Festival
- Third Friday block party on Mulberry Street

=== Landmarks and attractions ===
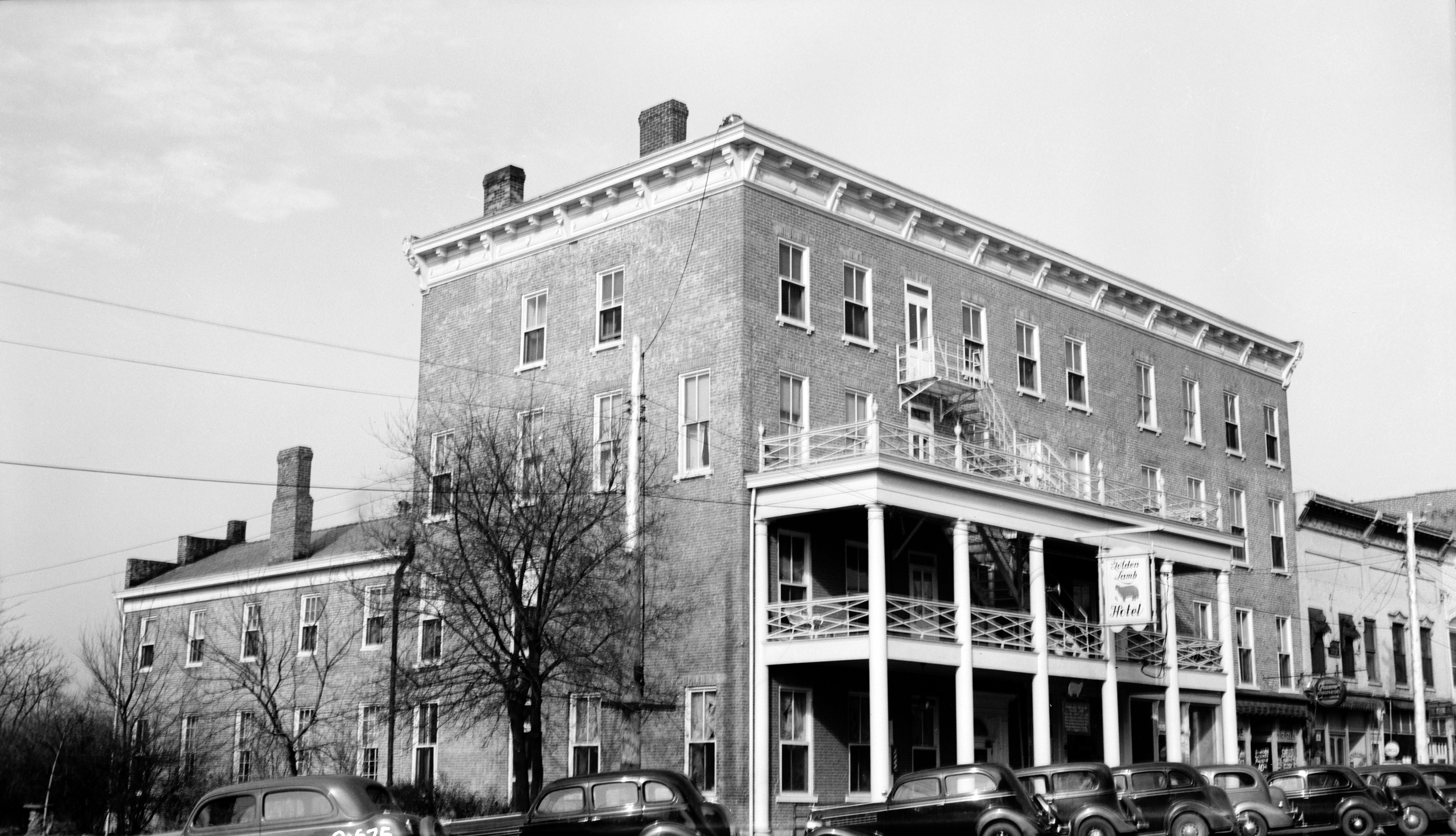
The Golden Lamb Inn, photographed November 15, 1936

The Golden Lamb Inn is the oldest hotel in Ohio, having been established in 1803. The present structure is built around the 1815 rebuilding of the inn and has been visited by 12 presidents.

The Warren County Historical Society museum includes the 1795 Beedle Log Cabin, and the Harmon Museum, housed in Harmon Hall, a three-story, 28,000 square feet (2,600 m^{2}) building with displays and exhibits of art and artifacts from prehistoric eras to the mid-20th century.

The Glendower State Memorial, owned by the Warren County Historical Society, was built in 1836 by Amos Bennett for John Milton Williams, a Lebanon merchant, and named for Owain Glyndŵr. It has been called "one of the finest examples of Residential Greek Revival architecture style in the Midwest".

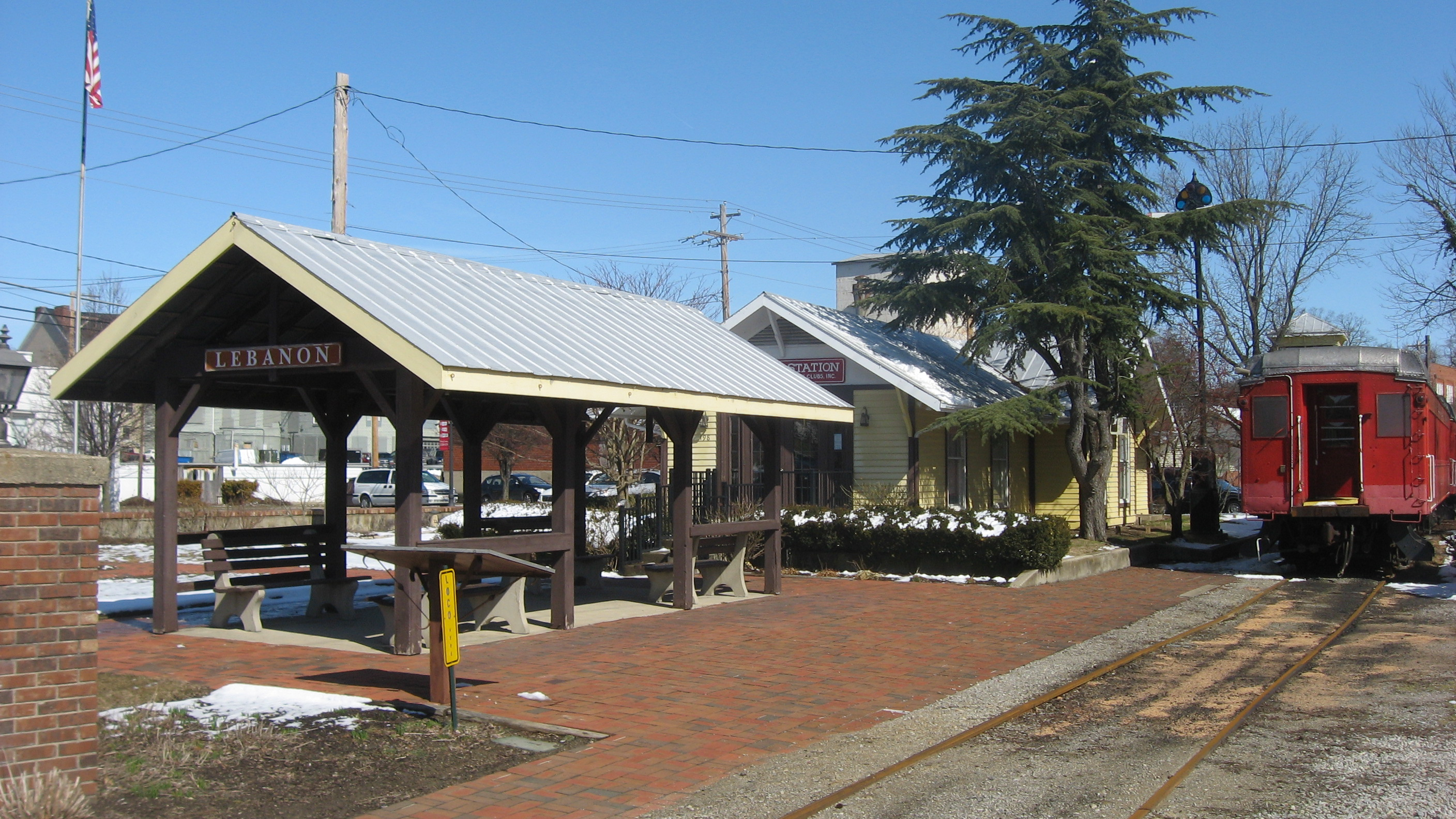
Lebanon Mason Monroe Railroad station

Lebanon is home to the Lebanon Mason Monroe Railroad, where passengers follow a scenic old stagecoach route along the right-of-way of the former Cincinnati, Lebanon and Northern Railway.

== Parks and recreation ==
The Countryside YMCA is one of the largest in the U.S. consists of: four basketball gyms, two weight rooms, five indoor pools, two outdoor pools, tennis courts, baseball fields, racquetball courts, preschool and daycare, gymnastics center, outdoor soccer fields, five aerobics rooms, senior citizen center, two waterparks (one inside, one outside), sports medicine center, rock climbing wall, two indoor tracks, outdoor track, acres of forest and trails, pond, outdoor playground, locker rooms, outdoor volleyball, and flag football fields.

Harmon Golf Club is a nine-hole, par 36 public golf course located on South East Street. It was built in 1912.

== Education ==
Lebanon City Schools operates the following public schools:

- Bowman Primary School (K–2)
- Donovan Elementary School (3–4)
- Berry Intermediate School (5–6)
- Lebanon Junior High School (7–8)
- Lebanon High School (9–12)

The city is served by a lending library, the Lebanon Public Library.

== Media ==
=== Print ===
- Today's Pulse (based in Liberty Township, Butler County)

=== Television ===
- Channel 6 - The Lebanon Channel City Cable
- Broadcast television from Cincinnati and Dayton markets

== Infrastructure ==
=== Airports ===
The Lebanon-Warren County Airport is located three nautical miles (3.5 mi; 5.6 km) northwest of Lebanon's central business district.

=== Highways ===
- Interstate 71
- U.S. Route 42
- Ohio State Route 48
- Ohio State Route 63
- Ohio State Route 123
- Ohio State Route 741

== Notable people ==
- Neil Armstrong, first man to walk on the Moon (during the 1969 Apollo 11 mission); made his home in Lebanon for 23 years after the Moon landing
- Sarah B. Armstrong, 19th-century physician, alumnist and faculty member of Lebanon University
- Cyrus Ball, judge
- Amos Booth, baseball player for Cincinnati Red Stockings 1876–77
- John Chivington, officer in American Civil War and Sand Creek Massacre
- Clay Clement, actor of 1930s films
- Thomas Corwin, Governor of Ohio from 1840 to 1842; U.S. Senator from 1845 to 1850
- Charles Cretors, invented the first popcorn machine in 1885
- Greg Demos, bass player for Guided by Voices
- Abby Franquemont, writer, revivalist of the art of hand spinning with a spindle
- George E. Gard, police chief of Los Angeles in 19th Century
- Scooter Gennett, MLB player for the Cincinnati Reds
- Woody Harrelson, (moved from Texas at age 12), film and TV actor, Emmy Award winner and three-time Academy Awards nominee
- Bruce Edwards Ivins, government scientist who committed suicide while under investigation for 2001 anthrax attacks
- Jill Jones, singer, songwriter, and actress
- Maldwyn Jones, motorcycle racer, American Motorcyclist Association Hall of Fame Inductee in 1998
- Michael Larson, famous game show contestant on Press Your Luck in 1984
- Andrew McBurney, Lieutenant Governor of Ohio, 1866–1868
- John McLean, Associate Justice of the U.S. Supreme Court from 1829 to 1861
- Ormsby M. Mitchel, West Point grad, astronomer, surveyor, general from 1812 to 1825
- Marcus Mote, early Ohio artist
- Corwin M. Nixon, state representative 1962–1992, minority leader 1979–1992
- F. E. Riddle, lawyer and Oklahoma Supreme Court justice
- Gordon Ray Roberts, U.S. Army Medal of Honor recipient
- Marty Roe, lead singer of the band Diamond Rio
- Dean Roll, pro wrestler known as Shark Boy or Dean Baldwin
- Casey Shaw, NBA player with the Philadelphia 76ers
- Larry Sparks, bluegrass singer and guitarist
- Russel Wright, industrial designer and artist; responsible for wide acceptance of Modernism in America

== In popular culture ==
The 1978 movie Harper Valley PTA with Barbara Eden and the 1994 movie Milk Money with Ed Harris and Melanie Griffith were both shot in Lebanon.

In October 2013, the Hallmark Channel movie The Christmas Spirit was filmed in Lebanon. In 2014, the movie Carol, starring Cate Blanchett, was partially filmed in Lebanon.

== See also ==
- Lebanon Countryside Trail
- Warren County Canal
- Cincinnati, Lebanon and Northern Railway
- Lebanon-Warren County Airport
- Fort Ancient (Lebanon, Ohio)
