= Fayetteville, Ohio =

- Village
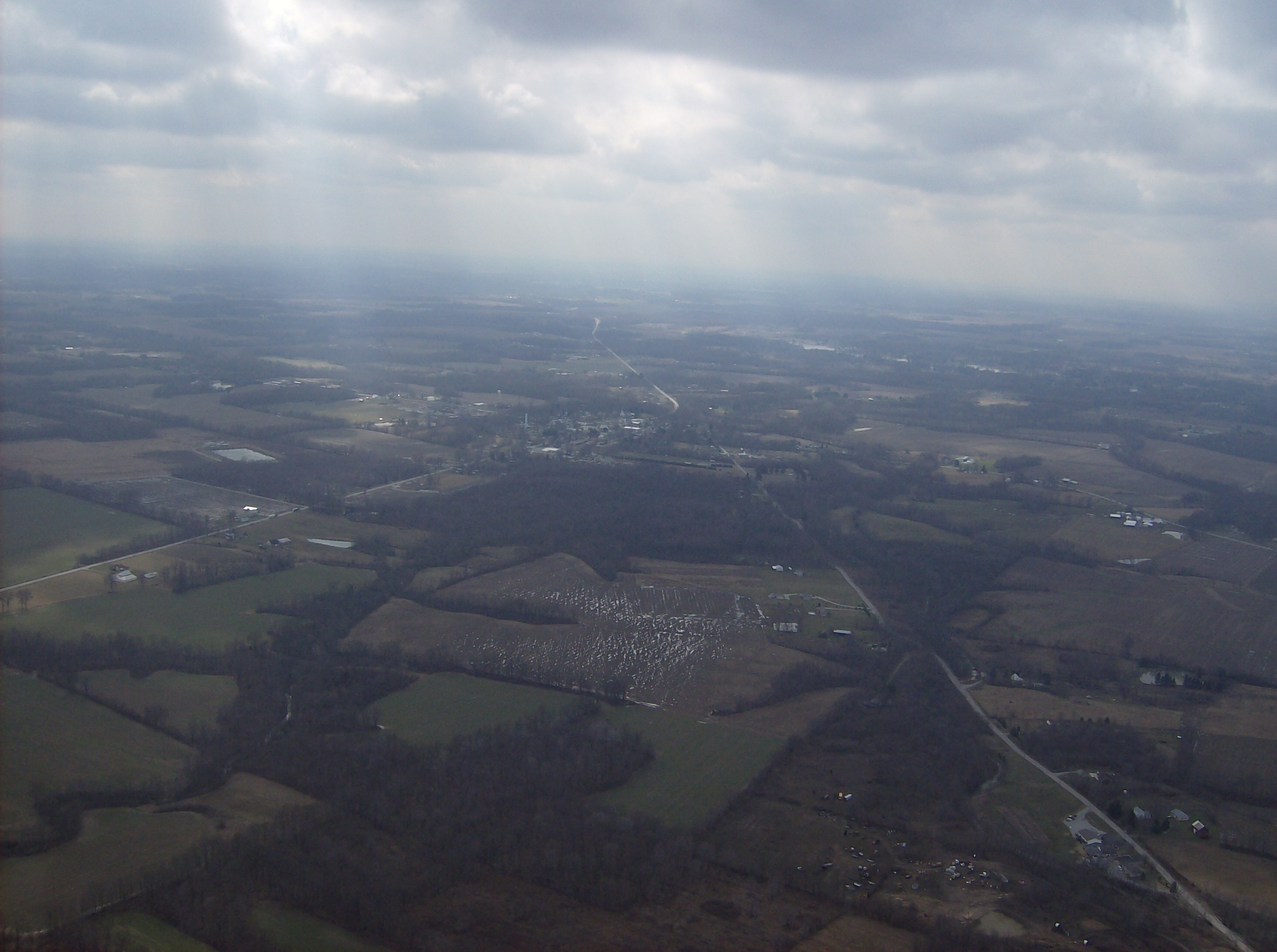
- Aerial view of Fayetteville and surrounding countryside

- Logo
- Motto: "The Crossroads of America"
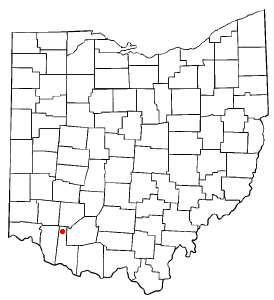
- Location of Fayetteville, Ohio

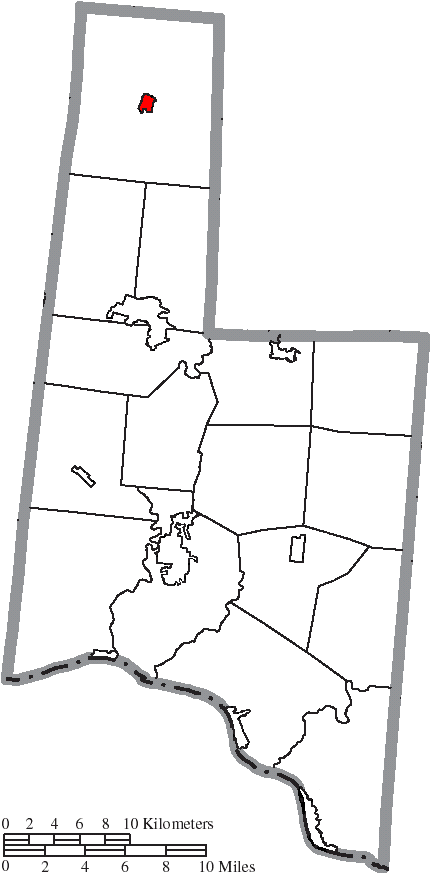
- Location of Fayetteville in Brown County
- Coordinates: 39°11′07″N 83°55′55″W
- Country: United States
- State: Ohio
- County: Brown
- Township: Perry
- Founded: 1818
- Incorporated: 1868

Government
  - Mayor: Jody F. Edwards

Area
  - Total: 0.47 sq mi (1.22 km^{2})
  - Land: 0.47 sq mi (1.22 km^{2})
  - Water: 0 sq mi (0.00 km^{2})
- Elevation: 945 ft (288 m)

Population (2020)
  - Total: 317
  - Estimate (2023): 310
  - Density: 671.0/sq mi (259.06/km^{2})
- Time zone: UTC-5 (Eastern (EST))
  - Summer (DST): UTC-4 (EDT)
- ZIP code: 45118
- Area code: 513
- FIPS code: 39-26796
- GNIS feature ID: 2398868
- Website: www.fayettevilleoh.us

Fayetteville is a village in Perry Township, Brown County, Ohio, United States. The population was 317 at the 2020 census.

== History ==
Fayetteville was founded in 1818 by an Irish immigrant named Cornelius McGroarty. It was later incorporated in 1868. In 1883, Fayetteville contained two churches, two schools, two hotels, several stores and saloons, and two drug stores.

== Geography ==
According to the United States Census Bureau, the village has a total area of 0.52 square miles (1.35 km^{2}), all land. It also rests on a bend of the East Fork Little Miami River.

== Demographics ==
Historical population
Census	Pop.	Note	%±
1850	317		—
1860	399		25.9%
1870	397		−0.5%
1880	390		−1.8%
1900	323		—
1910	370		14.6%
1920	349		−5.7%
1930	330		−5.4%
1940	394		19.4%
1950	401		1.8%
1960	389		−3.0%
1970	415		6.7%
1980	478		15.2%
1990	393		−17.8%
2000	372		−5.3%
2010	330		−11.3%
2020	317		−3.9%
2023 (est.)	310	▼	−2.2%
U.S. Decennial Census

=== 2010 census ===
As of the census of 2010, there were 330 people, 128 households, and 85 families living in the village. The population density was 634.6 inhabitants per square mile (245.0/km^{2}). There were 157 housing units at an average density of 301.9 per square mile (116.6/km^{2}). The racial makeup of the village was 99.4% White, 0.3% African American, and 0.3% from other races. Hispanic or Latino of any race were 1.2% of the population.

There were 128 households, of which 39.8% had children under the age of 18 living with them, 49.2% were married couples living together, 11.7% had a female householder with no husband present, 5.5% had a male householder with no wife present, and 33.6% were non-families. 28.9% of all households were made up of individuals, and 12.5% had someone living alone who was 65 years of age or older. The average household size was 2.58 and the average family size was 3.14.

The median age in the village was 36.8 years. 26.4% of residents were under the age of 18; 7.9% were between the ages of 18 and 24; 23.7% were from 25 to 44; 28.2% were from 45 to 64; and 13.9% were 65 years of age or older. The gender makeup of the village was 49.1% male and 50.9% female.

=== 2000 census ===
As of the census of 2000, there were 372 people, 142 households, and 93 families living in the village. The population density was 742.4 inhabitants per square mile (286.6/km^{2}). There were 154 housing units at an average density of 307.3 per square mile (118.6/km^{2}). The racial makeup of the village was 99.46% White, 0.27% African American, and 0.27% from two or more races.

There were 142 households, out of which 33.8% had children under the age of 18 living with them, 52.1% were married couples living together, 10.6% had a female householder with no husband present, and 34.5% were non-families. 26.8% of all households were made up of individuals, and 11.3% had someone living alone who was 65 years of age or older. The average household size was 2.62 and the average family size was 3.28.

In the village, the population was spread out, with 29.0% under the age of 18, 10.8% from 18 to 24, 32.0% from 25 to 44, 19.9% from 45 to 64, and 8.3% who were 65 years of age or older. The median age was 32 years. For every 100 females there were 93.8 males. For every 100 females age 18 and over, there were 94.1 males.

The median income for a household in the village was $34,375, and the median income for a family was $50,000. Males had a median income of $35,694 versus $26,667 for females. The per capita income for the village was $18,717. About 7.6% of families and 8.5% of the population were below the poverty line, including 8.6% of those under age 18 and 15.0% of those age 65 or over.

== Education ==
The village is served by Fayetteville-Perry High School. Fayetteville has a public library, a branch of the Brown County Public Library.

== Gallery ==
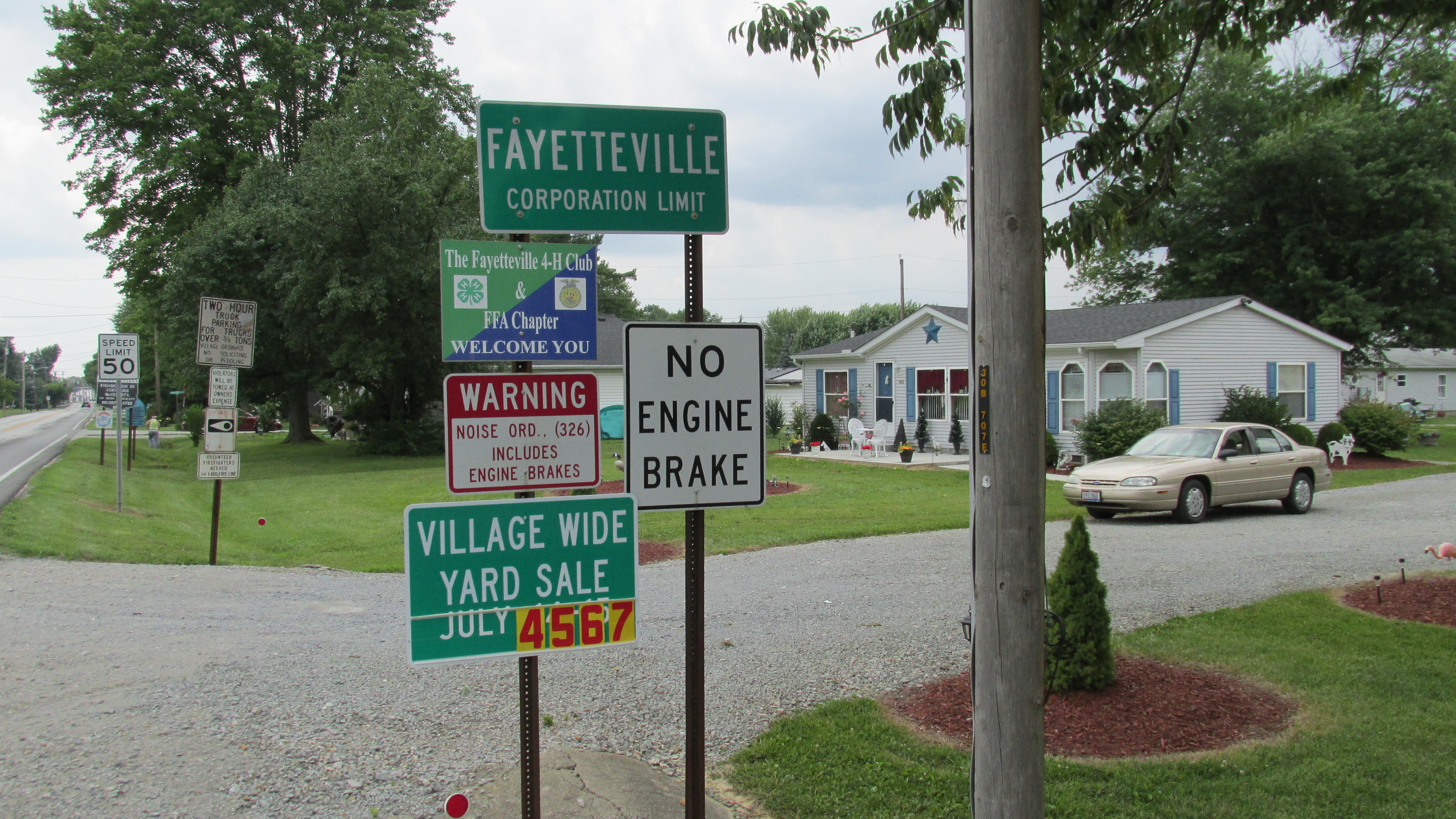
Fayetteville corporation limit sign

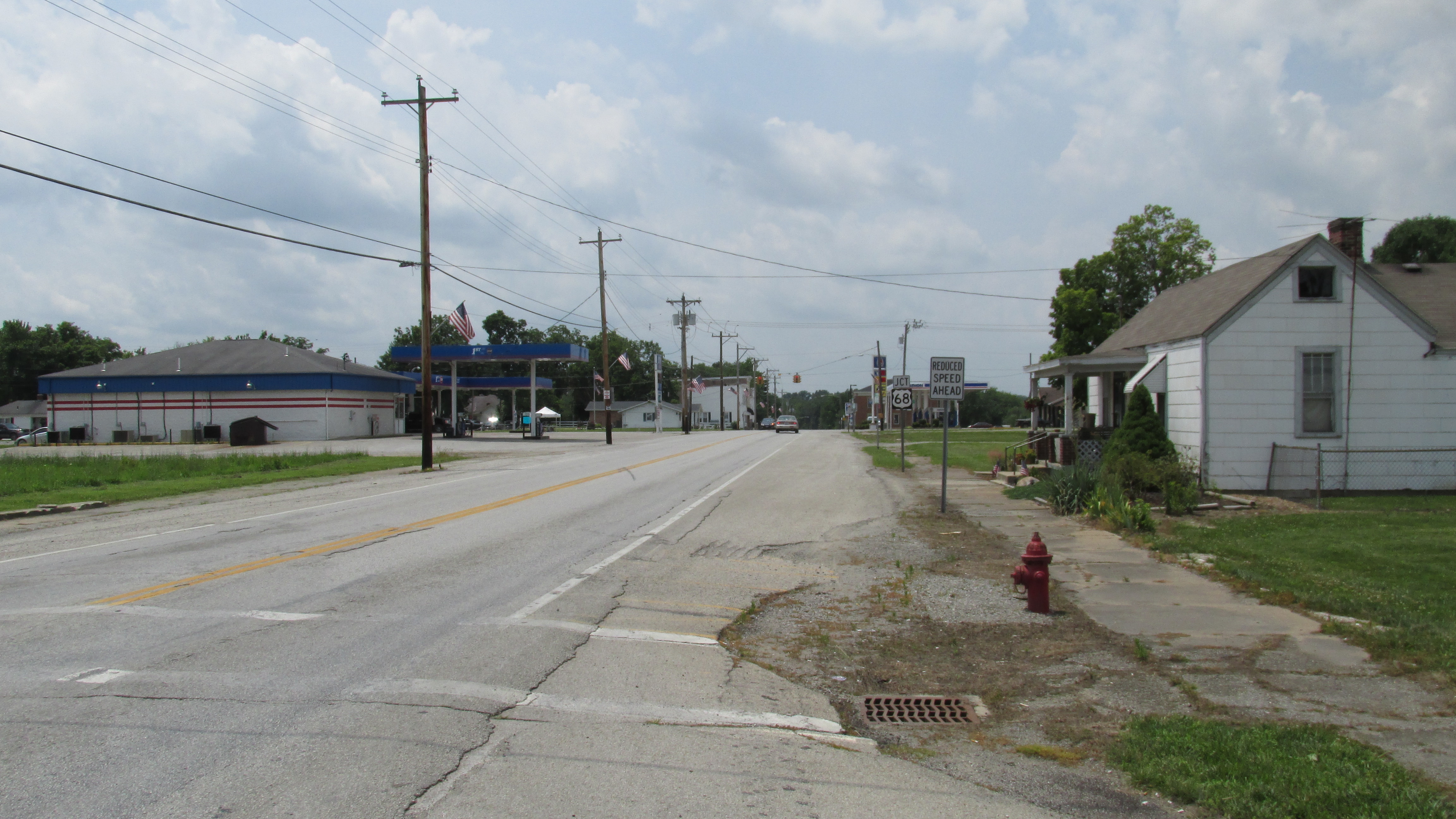
Looking west on Pike Street (U.S. Route 50)

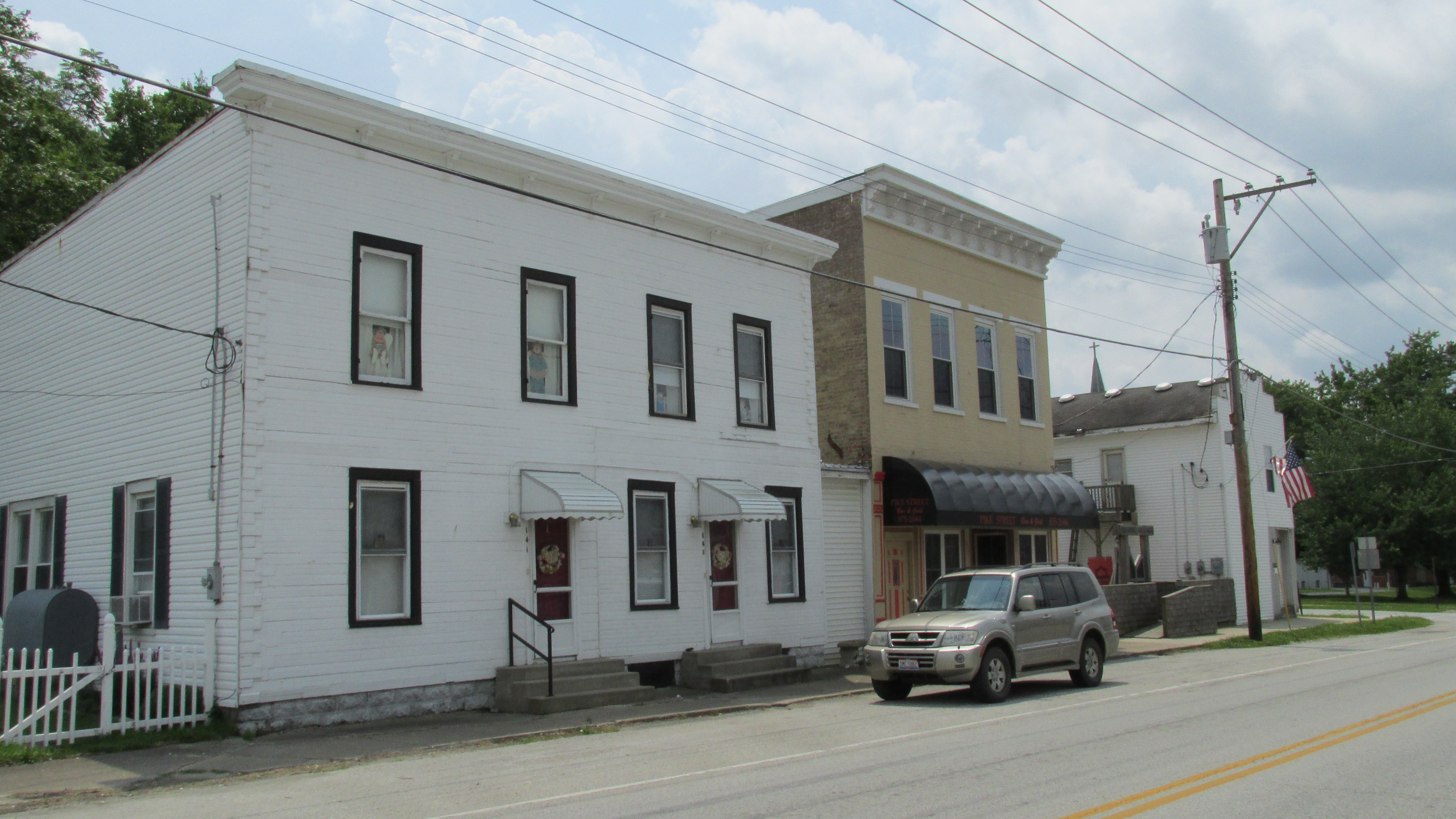
Pike Street

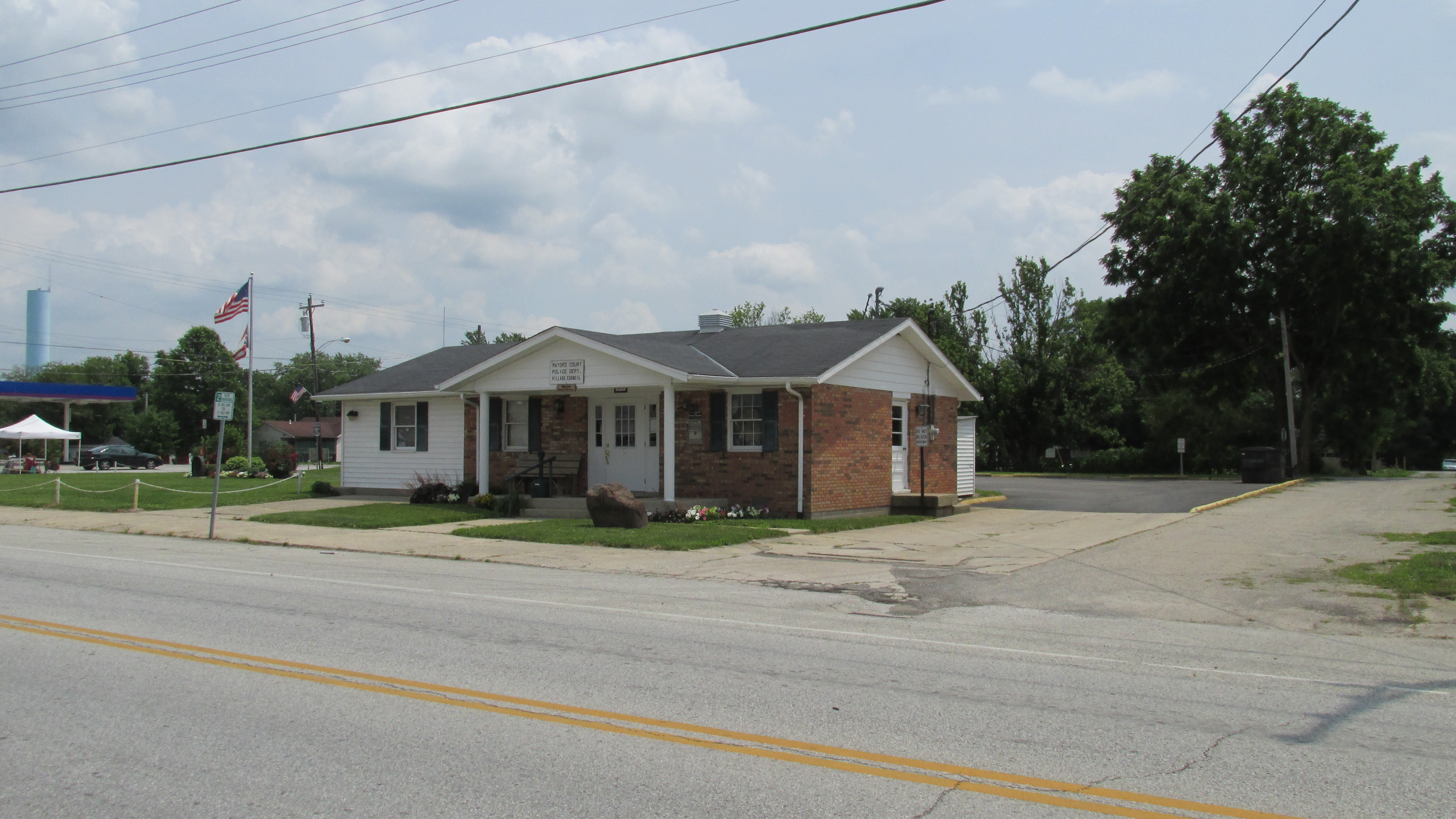
Fayetteville Municipal Building and Police Department

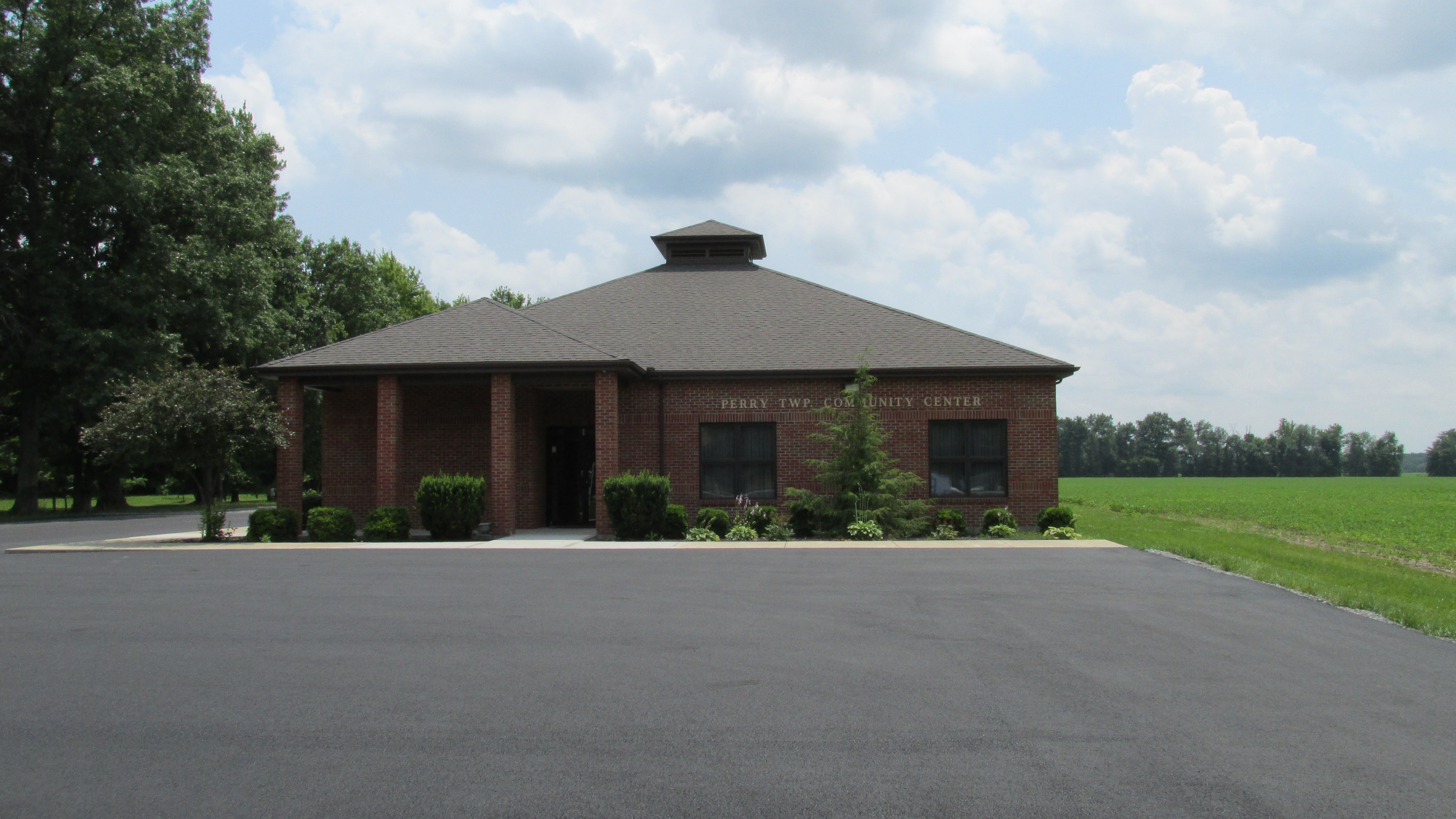
Perry Township Community Center

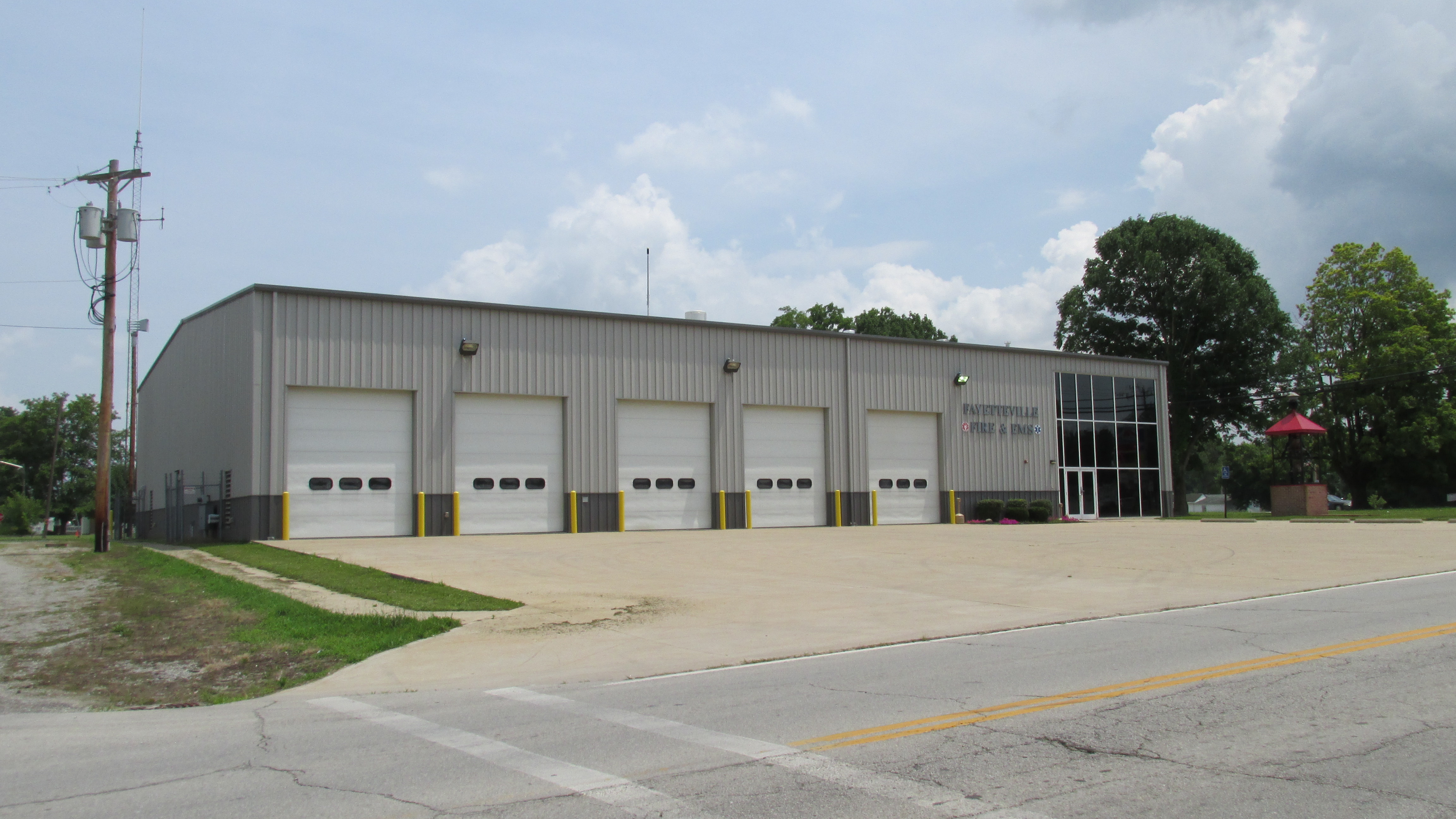
Fayetteville Fire and EMS Station

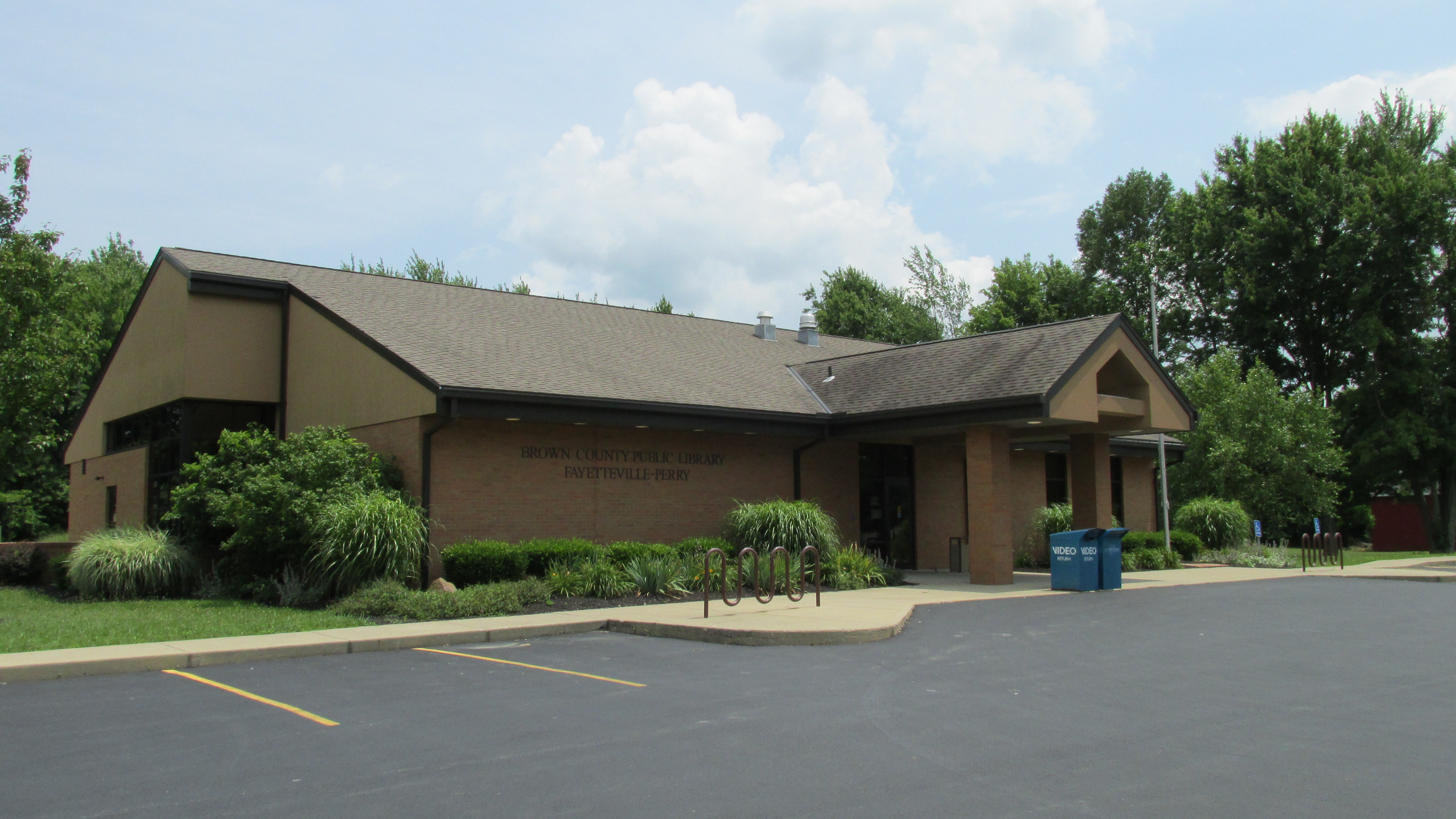
Fayetteville Library

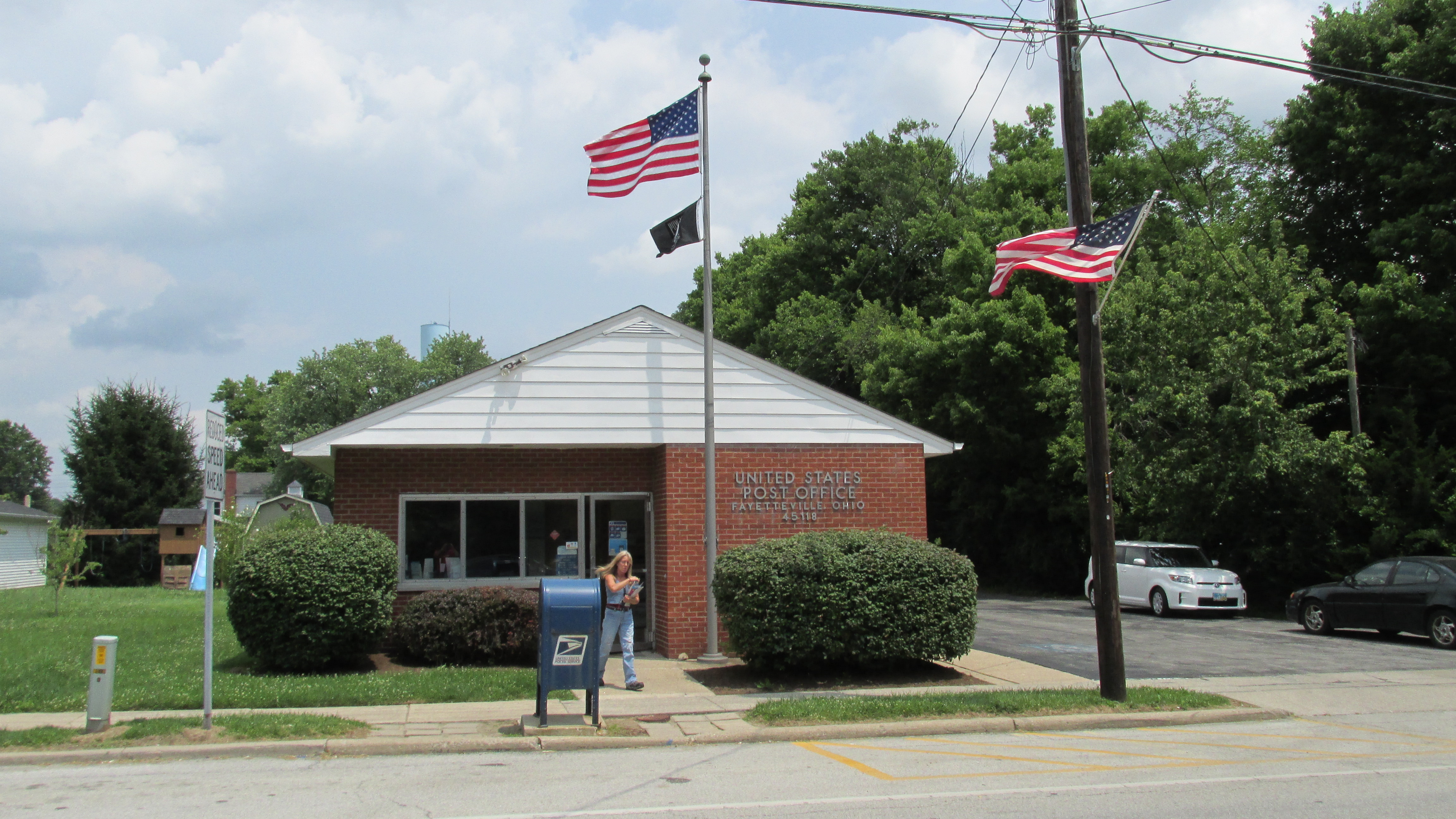
Fayetteville Post Office

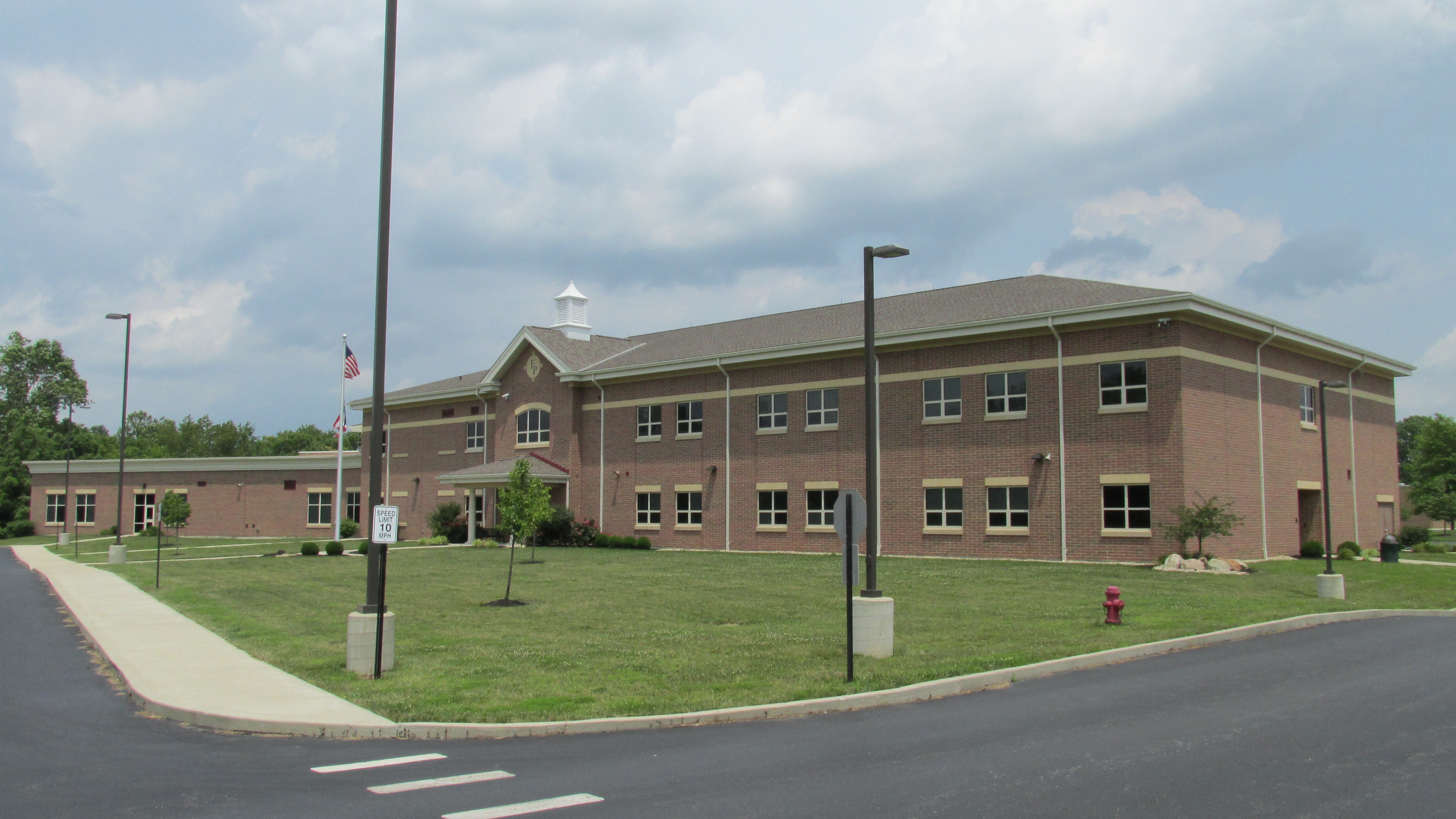
Fayetteville High School

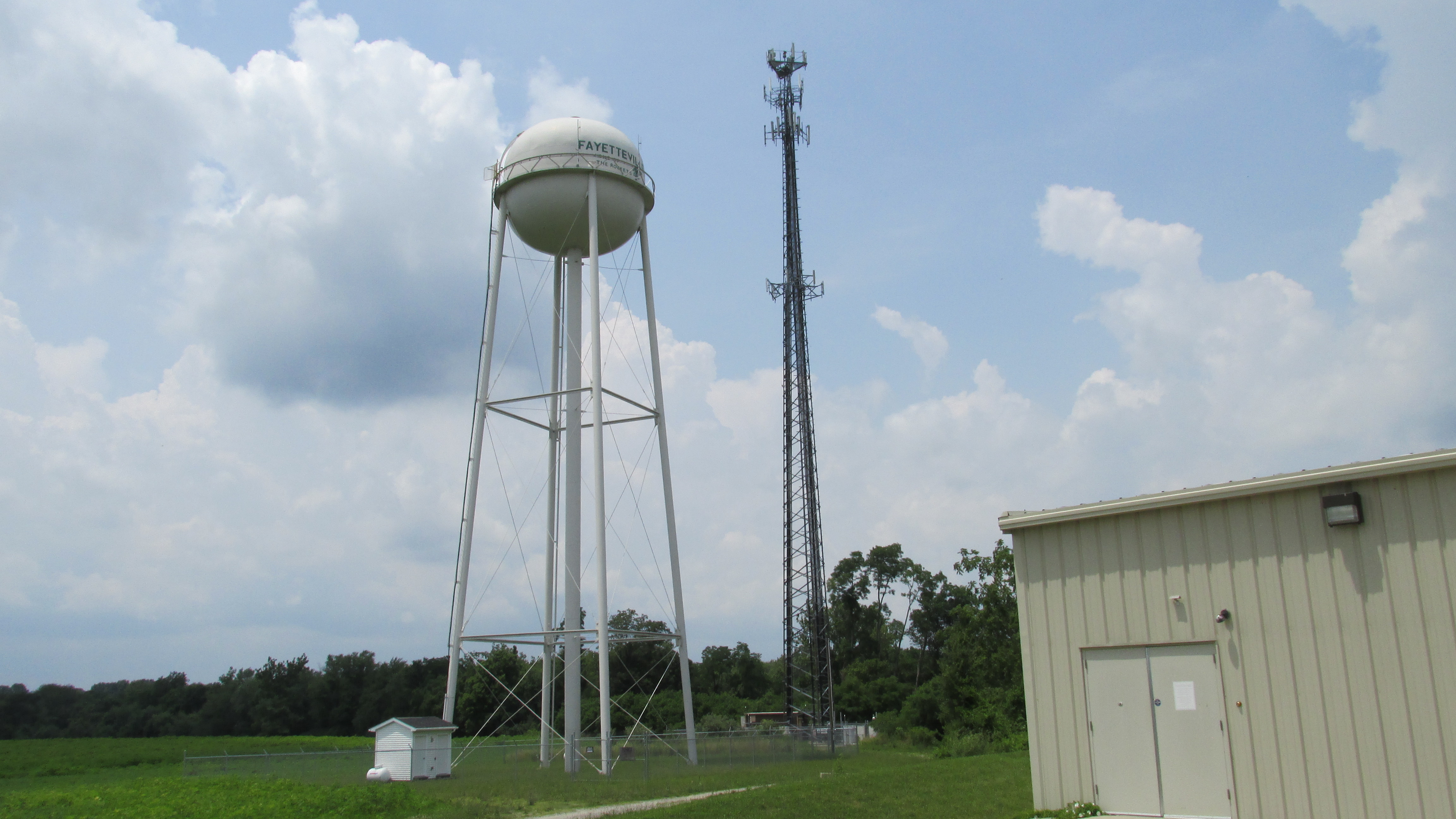
Water tower

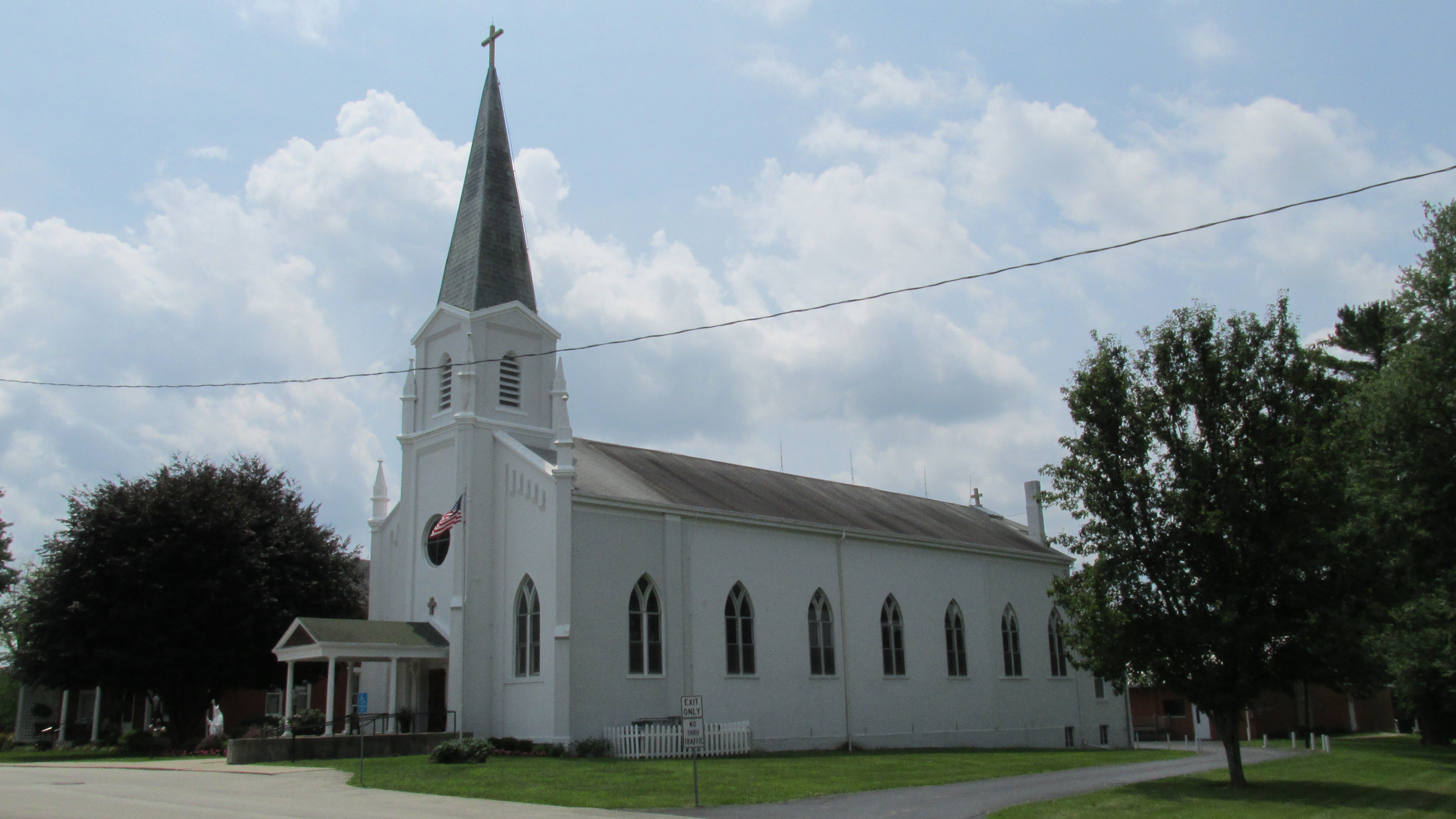
St. Patrick Catholic Church

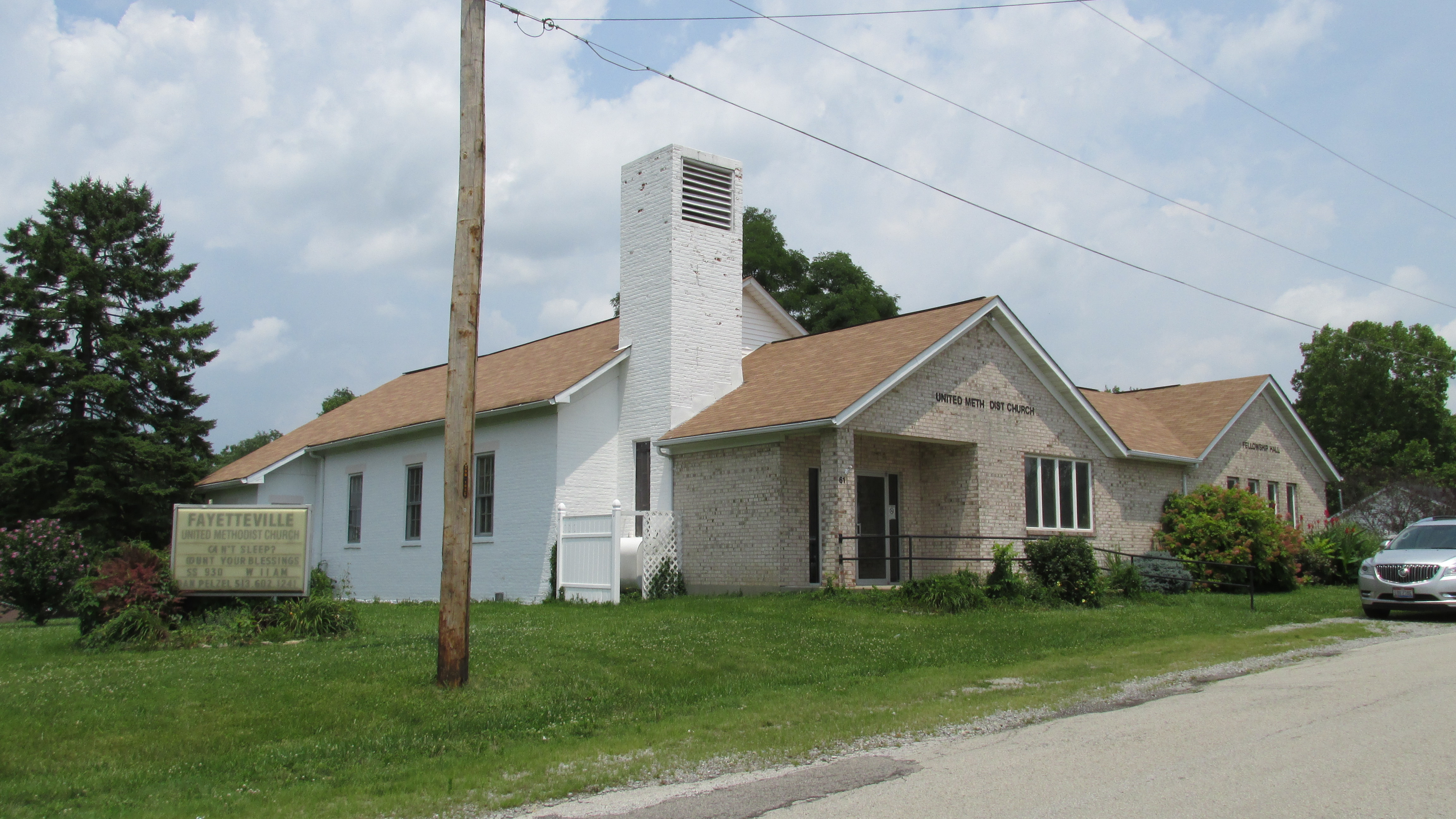
Fayetteville United Methodist Church

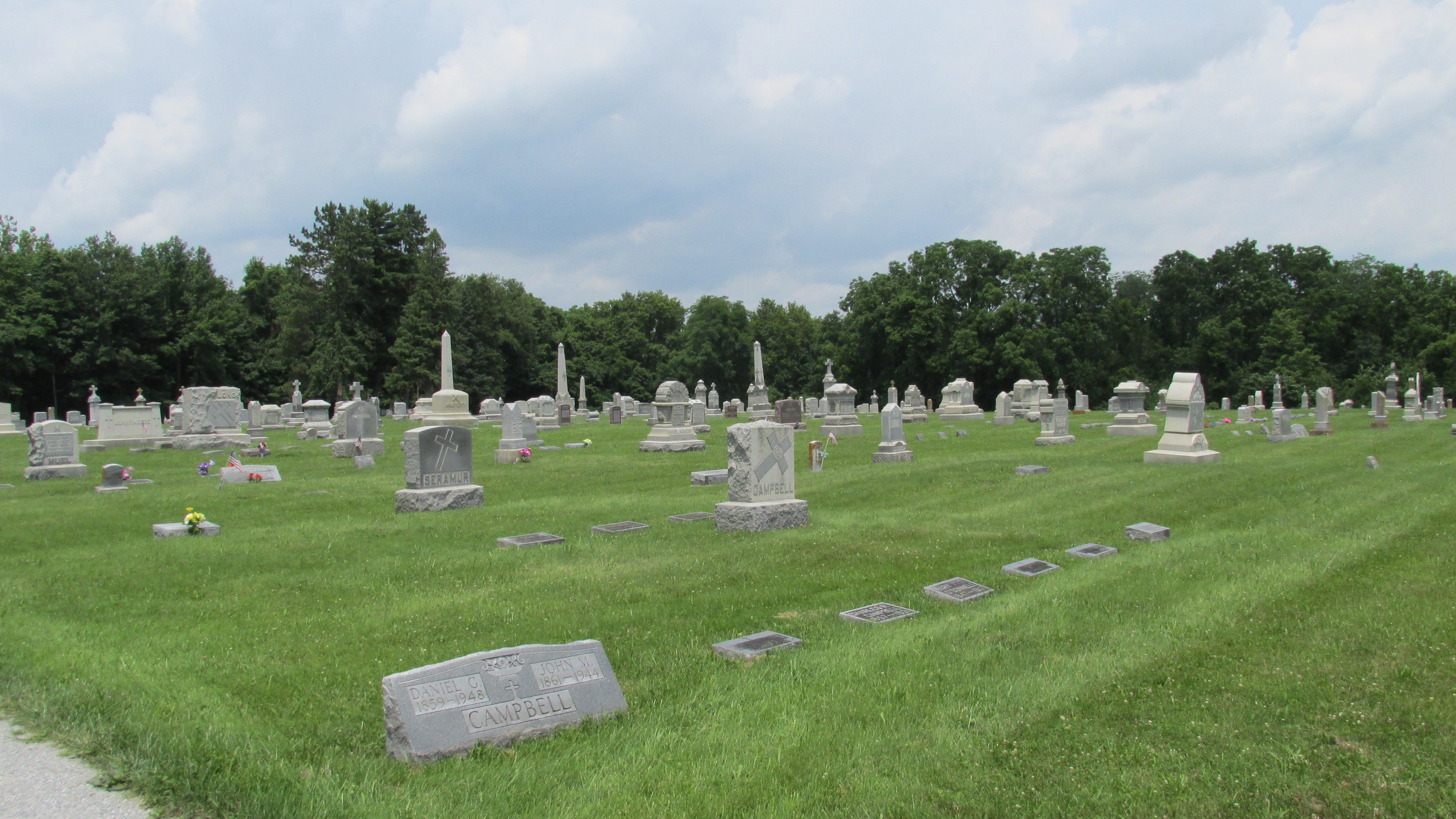
Fayetteville Cemetery

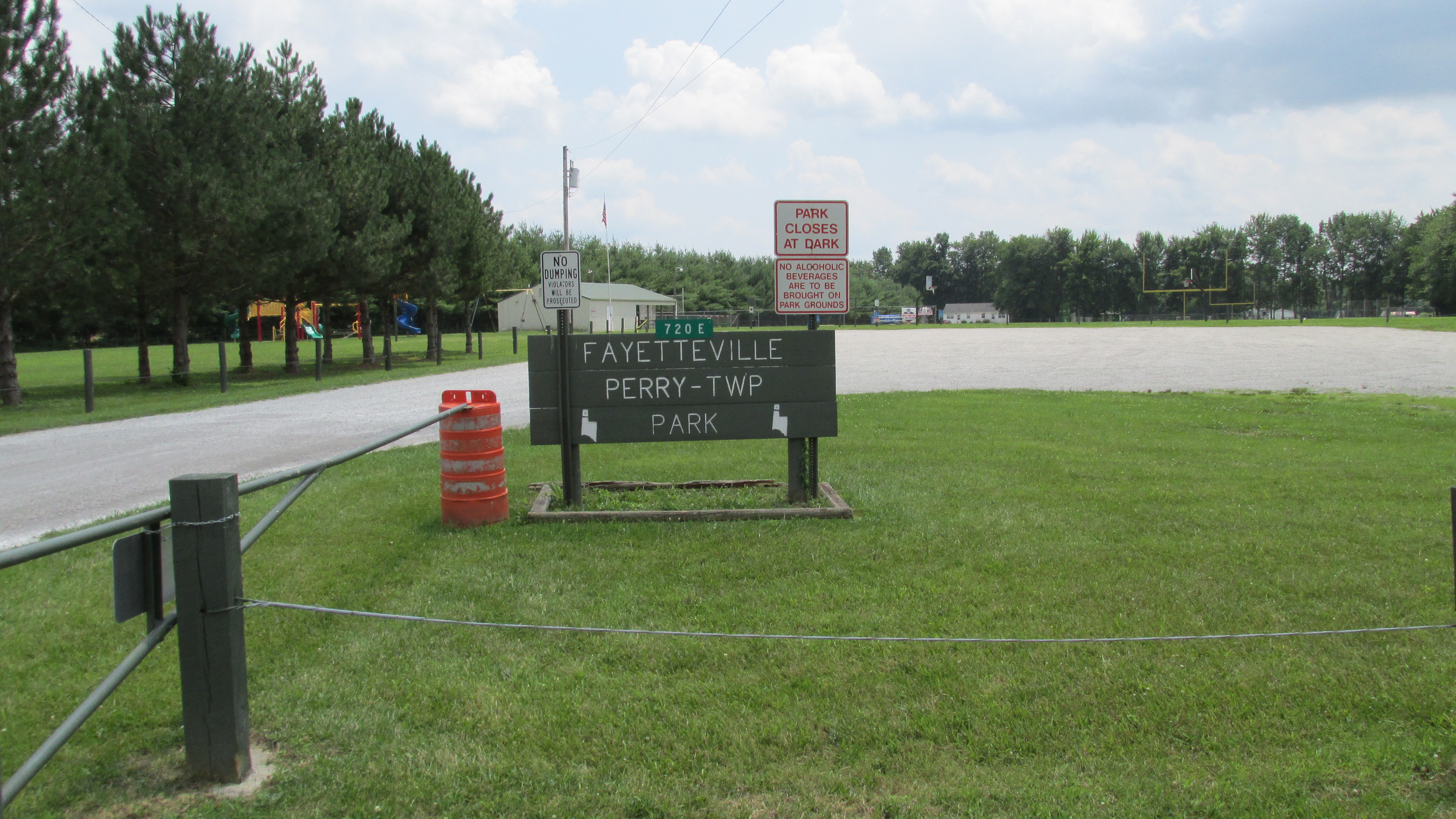
Fayetteville Perry Township Park
