= Fayetteville–Perry High School =

Fayetteville-Perry High School

Location
- 501 South Apple Street; Fayetteville, (Brown County), Ohio 45118; United States
- Coordinates: 39°10′55″N 83°55′54″W

Information
- Type: Public, Coeducational high school
- Opened: 2009
- School district: Fayetteville-Perry
- Superintendent: Tim Carlier
- Principal: April Flowers
- Teaching staff: 14.00 (FTE)
- Grades: 9-12
- Average class size: 75
- Student to teacher ratio: 15.93
- Colors: Kelly Green and White
- Slogan: As Always, Go Rockets
- Fight song: On Wisconsin
- Athletics conference: Southern Hills Athletic League
- Sports: Soccer, Baseball, Softball, Basketball, Football, Volleyball, Cross Country, Track and Field
- Mascot: Rocket
- Team name: Rockets
- School fees: Based on grade
- Communities served: Fayetteville, St. Martin, Southern Blanchester, Lake Lorelei, Chasetown
- Website: fpls.us/page/high-school

Fayetteville-Perry High School is a public high school in Fayetteville, Ohio. It is the only high school in the Fayetteville-Perry Local Schools district and is in northern Brown County.

As of the 2013–14 school year, enrollment is approximately 350.

Fayetteville-Perry's current two-story building opened in 2009, replacing one that was more than 100 years old. The new building was constructed in front of the old one, and both Fayetteville Middle School and Fayetteville Elementary School are on the same campus as the high school. The high school shares a cafetorium, band room and library with the middle school. Fayetteville-Perry extracurriculars include Academic Team, FFA, FCCLA, Language Club, Student Council, Art Club, Science Club, Mock Trial, Drama Club, and Band.

== History ==
The original Fayetteville-Perry High School was built in 1895. In 1906 The Sisters of Charity of Cincinnati migrated here to use the building as St. Aloysius' Boys' Boarding Academy, twice operating as a military academy before its final closure in 1953. The building was demolished in 2009 to make way for the new two-story building mentioned above.

The second high school was located on 160 East Street, and was built in 1936. It was also added onto in 1958. Throughout this particular buildings life it housed every grade of student, from Kindergarten to seniors in high school, all the while bearing the "High School" engraving above the front entrance. This school served as Fayettevilles' Elementary School from the years of 1995 to 2009, after which, these students were moved to what was the middle school (now the elementary school). This building was demolished shortly after the original high school in 2009.

The newest high school was built in 2009, and incorporates a small section of the original high school, including its gymnasium. It is segregated into a two-story, road-facing building for the high school students and faculty including gymnasium and library, with a cafetorium as the attachment point for the middle school wing. The faculty and student parking lot fills the space left behind the buildings.

== Athletics ==
The school's sports teams are known as the Rockets, and the school colors are kelly green and white. Fayetteville-Perry has been a member of the 14-team Southern Hills Athletic League since 1970 and the school has sports programs for Basketball, Baseball, Softball, Football, Cross Country, Volleyball, and Track and Field. As of 2014–15, there are 10 schools remaining.

== Gallery ==
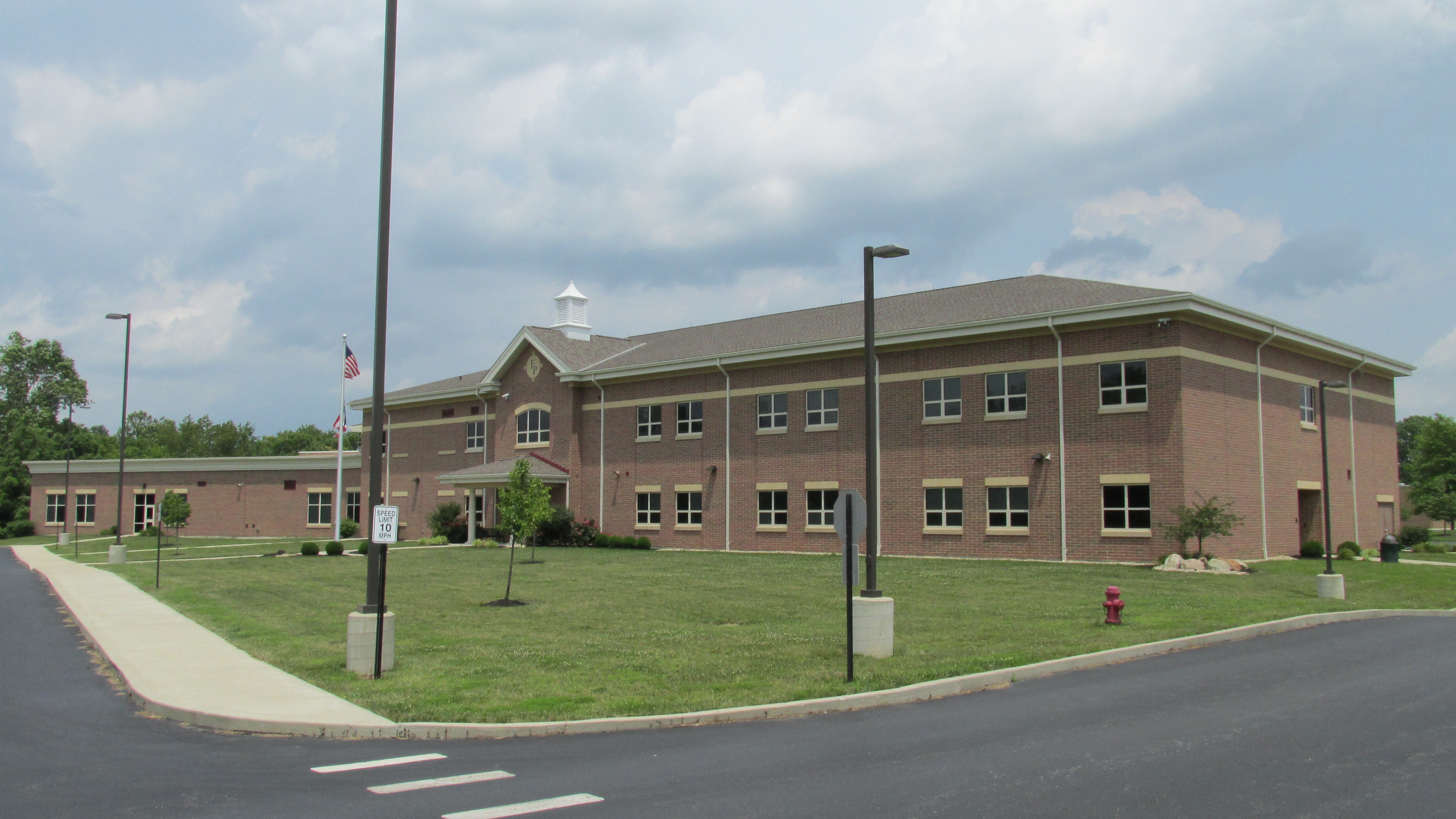
Fayetteville High School

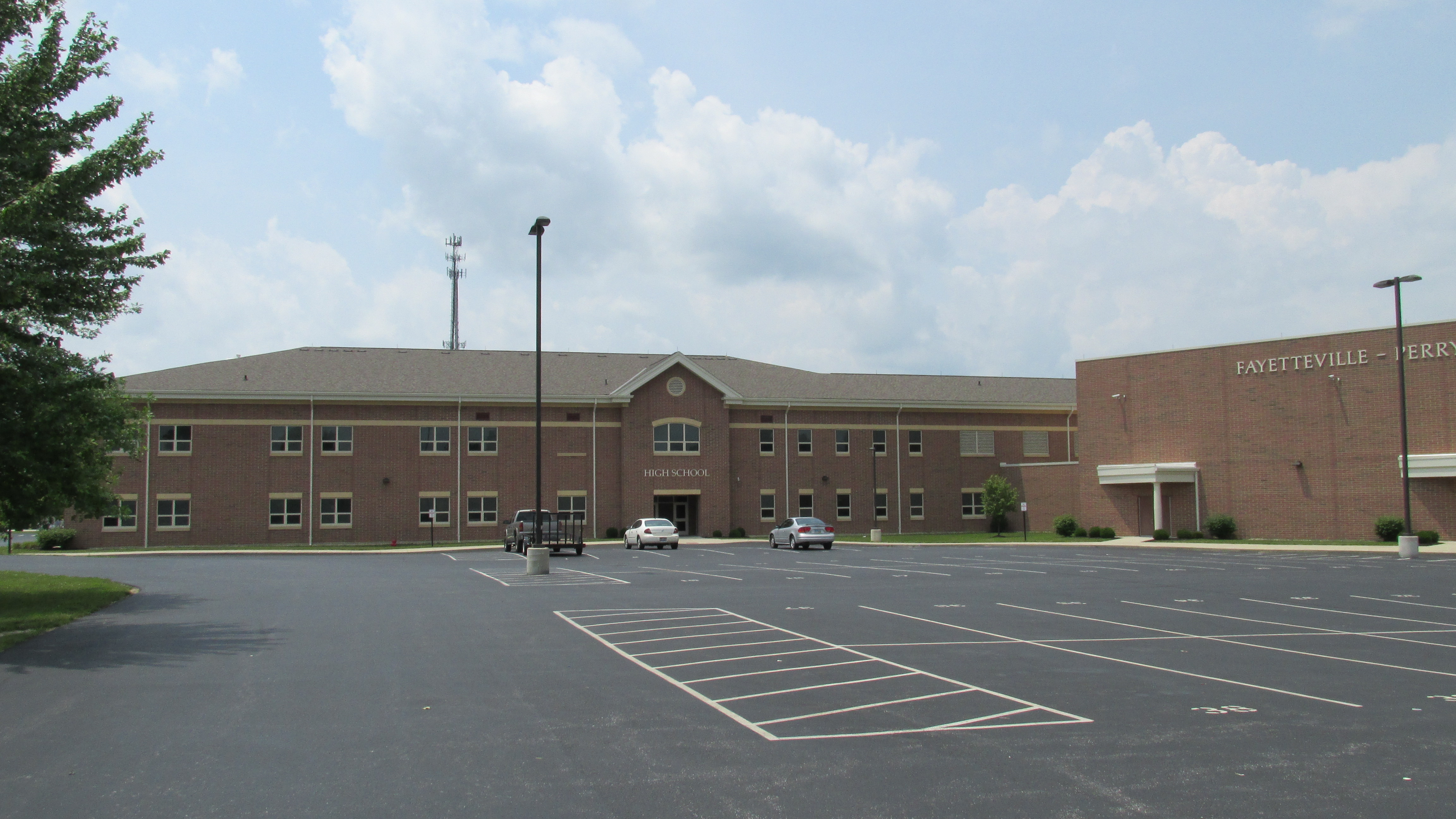
Fayetteville High School

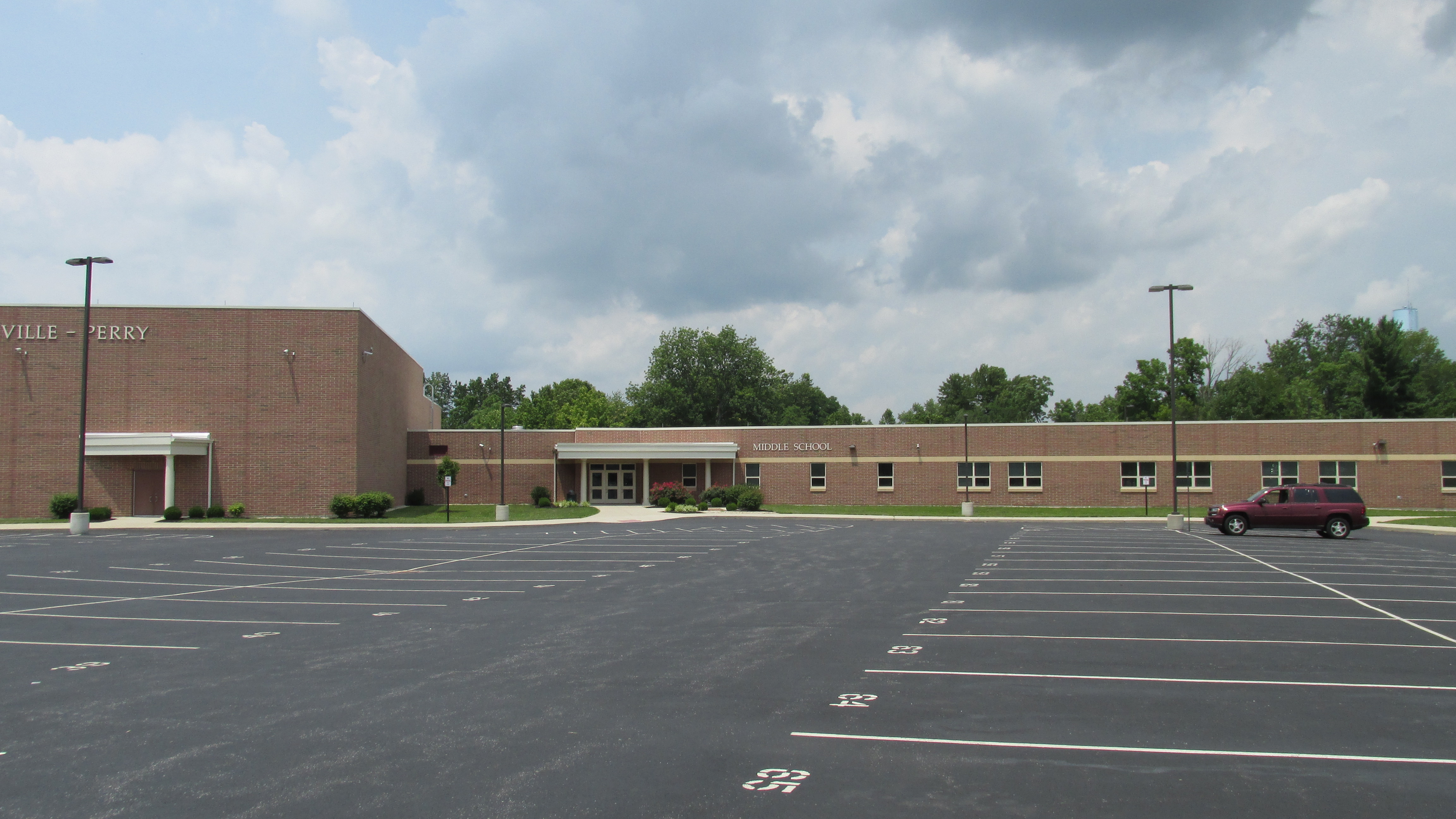
Fayetteville Middle School

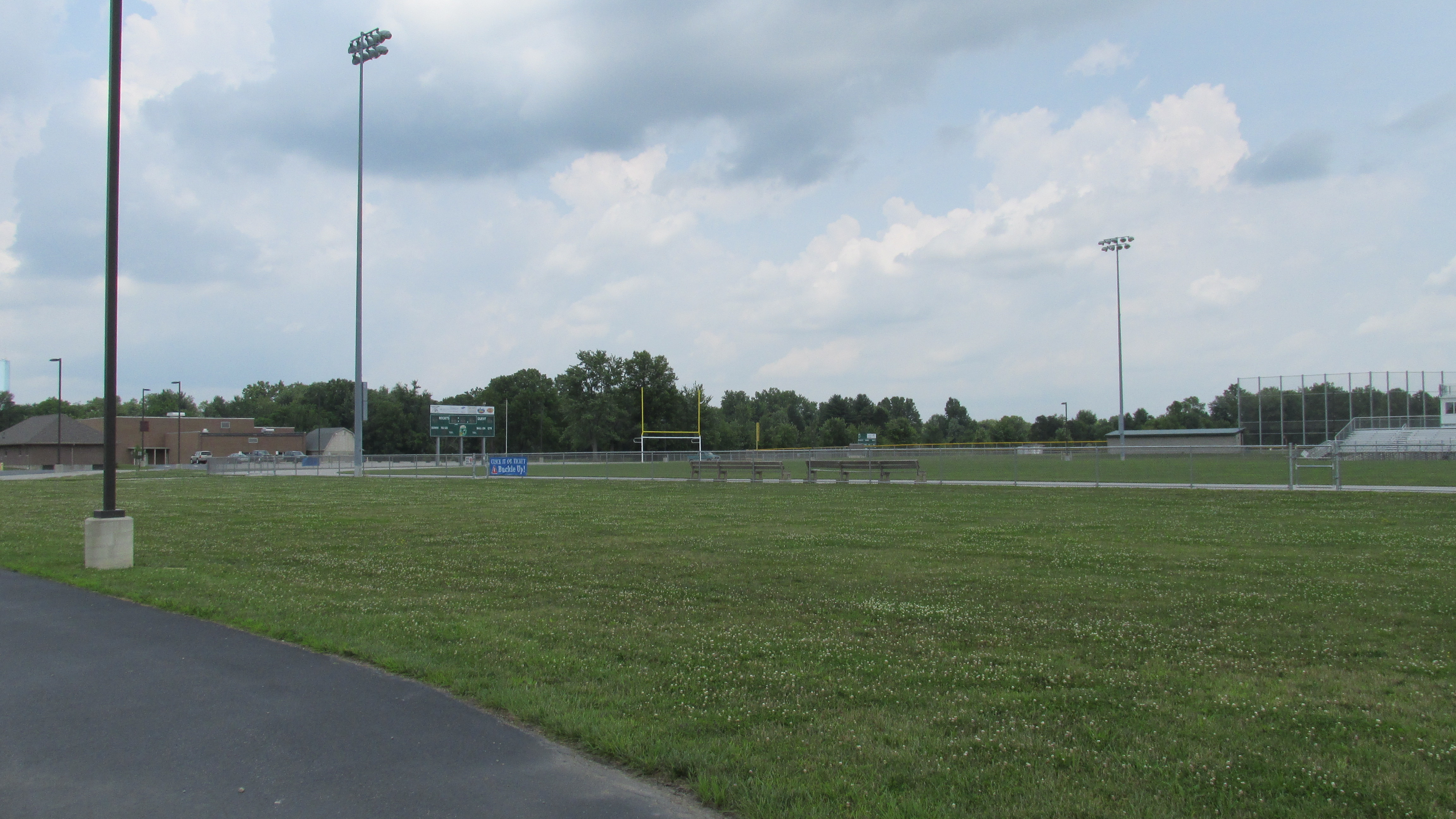
Football Field

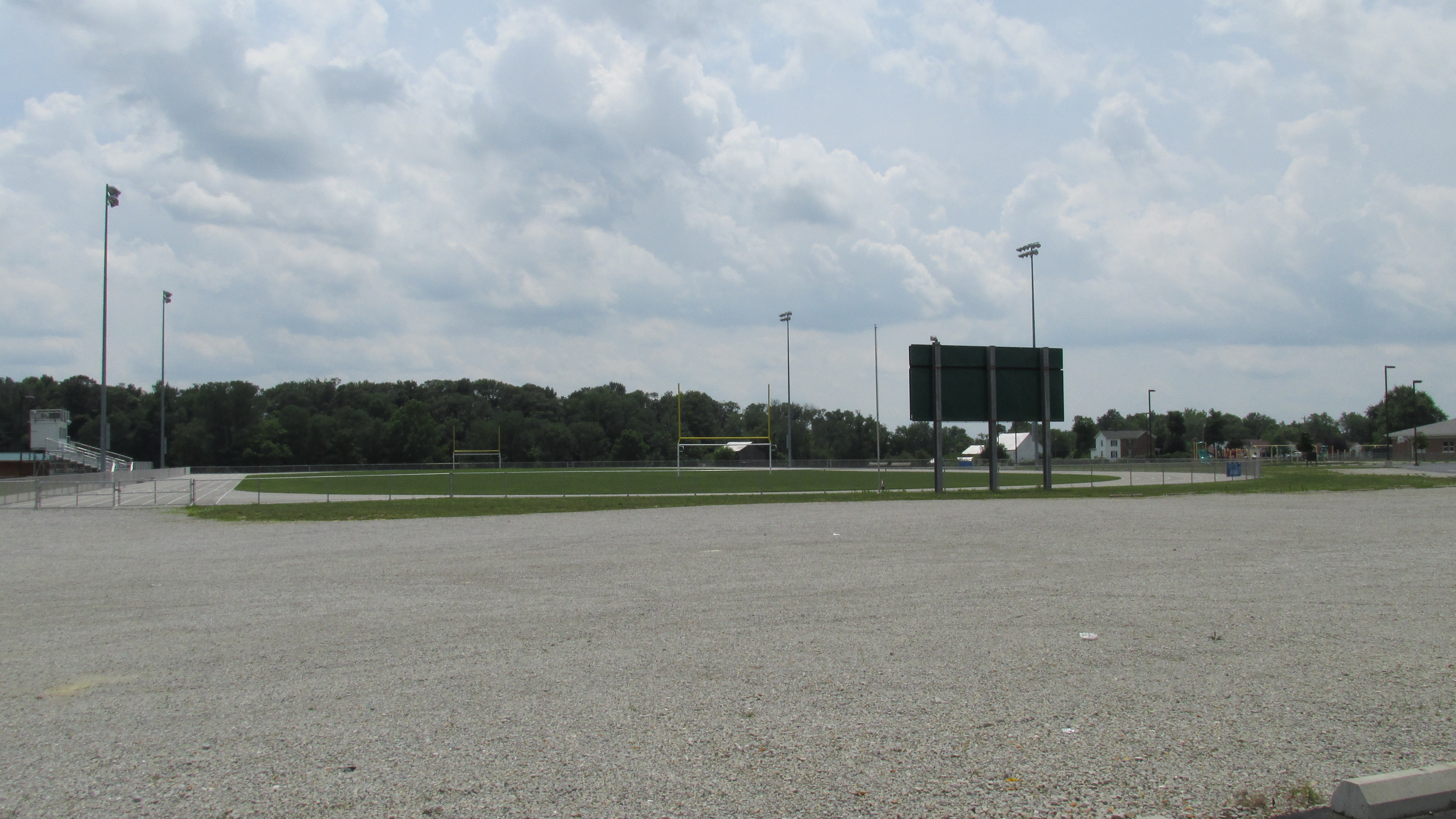
Football Field

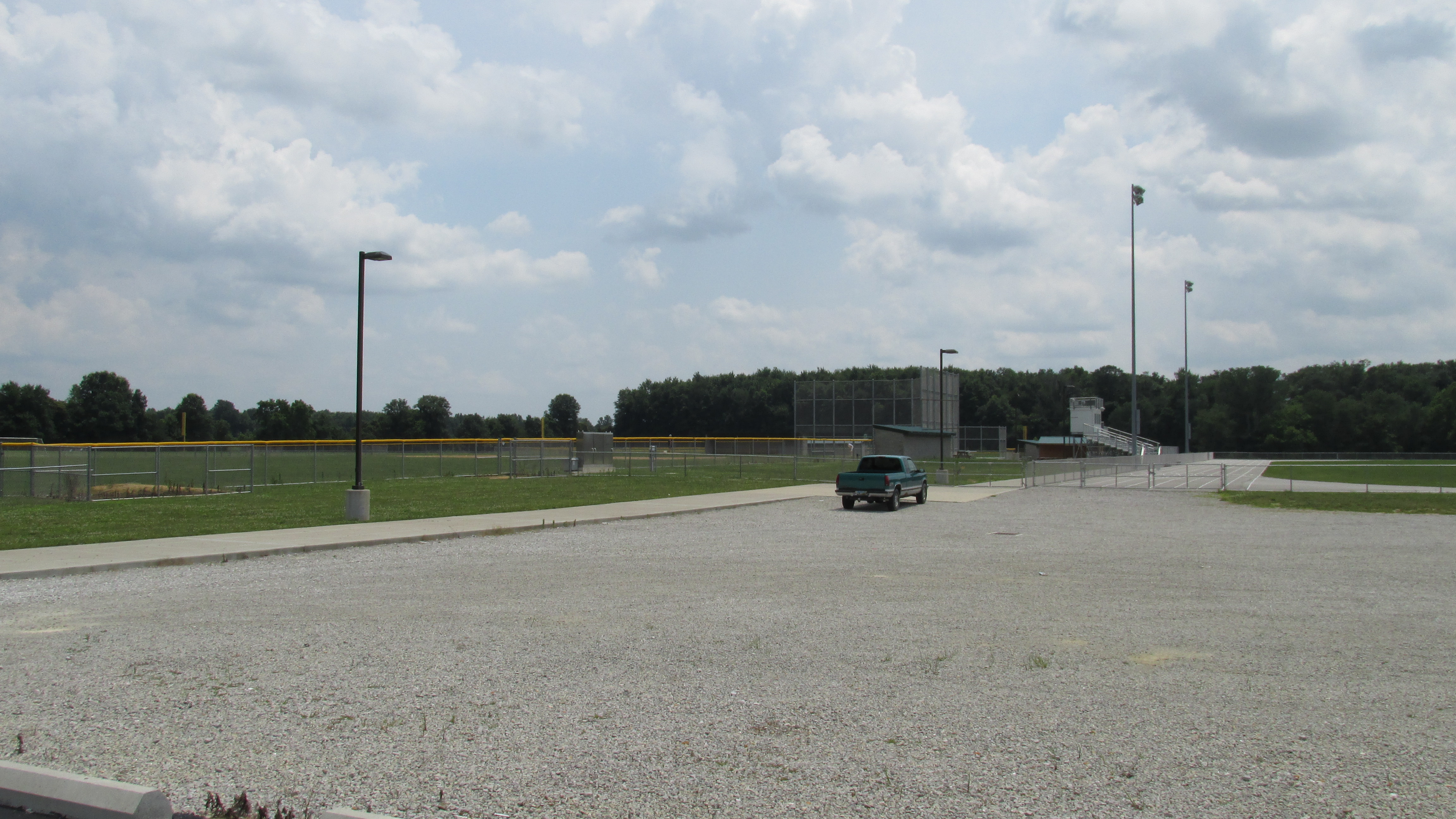
Baseball Field

See also Ohio High School Athletic Association and Ohio High School Athletic Conferences
