= Songwriter =

Person who writes the words or music to songs

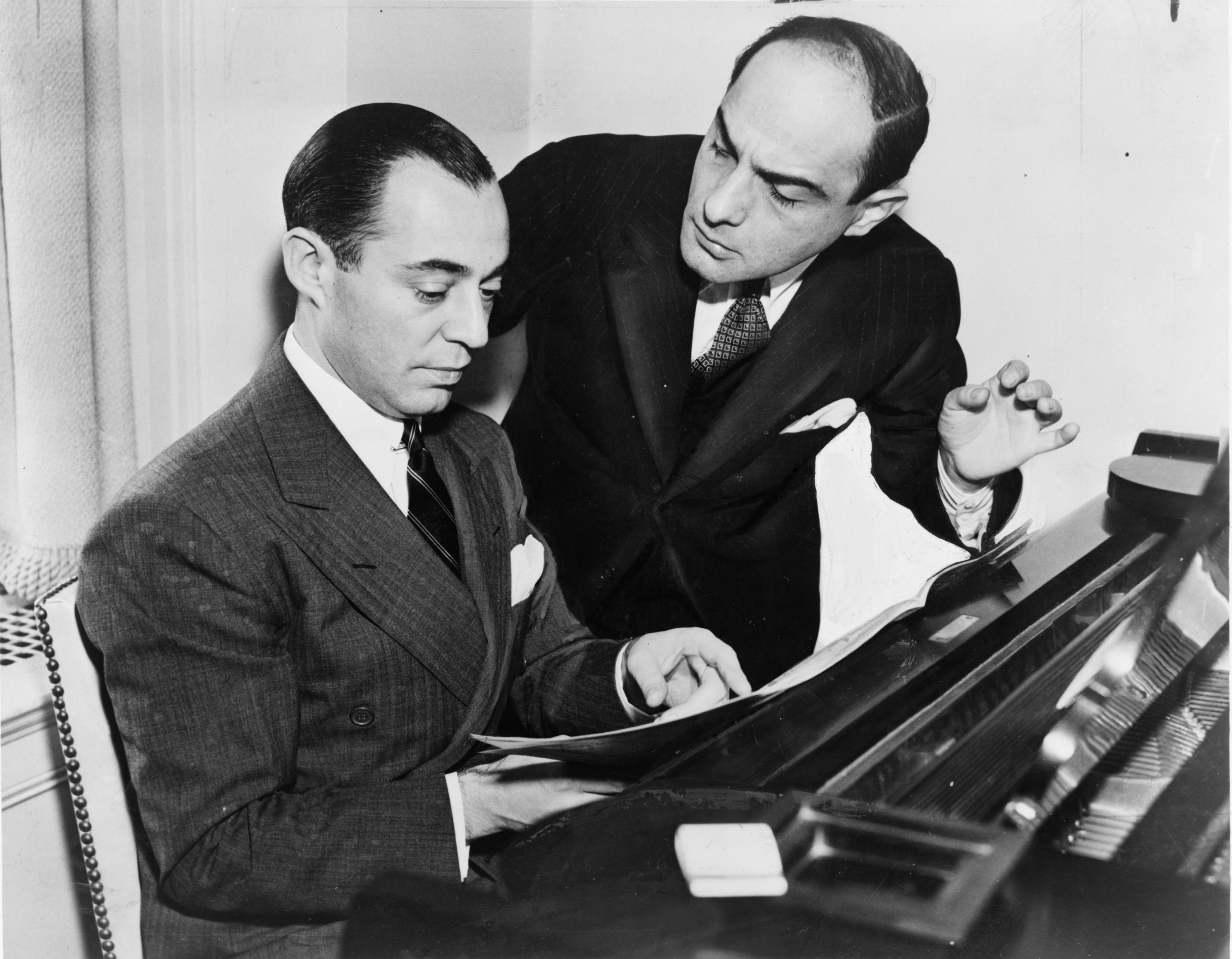
Songwriting partners Rodgers and Hart working on a song in 1936

A songwriter is a person who creates musical compositions or writes lyrics for songs, or both. The writer of the music for a song can be called a composer, although this term tends to be used mainly in classical music and film and video game scoring. A songwriter who mainly writes the lyrics for a song is referred to as a lyricist. Pressure from the music industry to produce popular hits means that commercial songwriting is often a collaborative process with tasks shared among multiple people. For example, a songwriter who excels at writing lyrics might be paired with another songwriter who specialises in creating original melodies. Pop songs may be composed by group members from the band or by staff writers – songwriters directly employed by music publishers. Some songwriters serve as their own music publishers, while others have external publishers.

In recent decades, the traditional apprenticeship and self-taught approaches to learning how to write songs are being supplemented by university degrees, college diplomas and "rock schools". Knowledge of modern music technology (sequencers, synthesizers, computer sound editing), songwriting elements and business skills are significant for modern songwriters. Several music colleges offer songwriting diplomas and degrees with music business modules. Since songwriting and publishing royalties can be substantial sources of income, particularly if a song becomes a hit record; legally, in the US, songs written after 1934 may be copied only by the authors. The legal power to grant these permissions may be bought, sold or transferred. This is governed by international copyright law.

Songwriters can be employed in a variety of different ways. They may exclusively write lyrics or compose music alongside another artist. They could present songs to A&R teams, publishers, agents and managers for consideration to a range of artists. Song pitching can be done on a songwriter's behalf by their publisher or independently using tip sheets like RowFax, the MusicRow publication and SongQuarters. Skills associated with songwriting include entrepreneurism and creativity. Certain contractual scenarios result in staff writers and songwriters not receiving a public credit for their contributions to a song, similar to a ghostwriter in literary publishing.

== Staff writers ==
Songwriters who sign an exclusive songwriting agreement with a publisher are called staff writers. Being a staff writer effectively means that, during the term of the songwriter's contract with the publisher, all their songs are automatically published by that company and cannot be published elsewhere.

In the Nashville country music scene, there is a strong staff writer culture where contracted writers work normal "9-to-5" hours at the publishing office and are paid a regular salary, says staff writer Gary Growden. This salary is in effect the writer's "draw", an advance on future earnings, which is paid monthly and enables them to live within a fixed budget. The publisher owns the copyright of songs written during the term of the agreement for a designated period, after which the songwriter can reclaim the copyright. In an interview with HitQuarters, songwriter Dave Berg extolled the benefits of the set-up: "I was able to concentrate on writing the whole time and have always had enough money to live on."

Unlike contracted writers, some staff writers operate as employees for their respective publishers. Under the terms of these work for hire agreements, the compositions created are fully owned by the publisher. Because the recapture provision of the United States Copyright Act of 1976 does not apply to "works made for hire", the rights to a song created under an employment contract cannot be "recaptured" by the writer after 35 years. In Nashville, young writers are often strongly encouraged to avoid these types of contracts.

Staff writers are common across the whole industry, but without the more office-like working arrangements favoured in Nashville. All the major publishers employ writers under contract. Obtaining a staff writer contract with a publisher can be the first step for any professional songwriting career, with some writers with a desire for greater independence outgrowing this set-up once they achieve a degree of success. Songwriter Allan Eshuijs described his staff writer contract at Universal Music Publishing as a starter deal. His success under the arrangement eventually allowed him to found his own publishing company so that he could "keep as much [publishing income] as possible and say how it's going to be done."

== Specific roles ==
=== Beatmaker ===
A beatmaker is a songwriter who creates and composes music or beats for a song, often laying the groundwork or "musical bed". Tools typically used are synthesizers, drum machines, and digital audio workstations. Beat makers or composers are not necessarily record producers by definition since they generally do not work directly with artists in a recording studio that oversees the production and recording of the final product. Rather, they contribute an essential part of the song which the record producer and artist develop in a studio session.

Some record producers are also beatmakers, and they will be involved in the entire process: generally receiving a songwriting and production credit. This is especially true for R&B and hip-hop producers in urban hip hop production. For example, producers such as Rodney Jerkins, Dr. Dre, Timbaland or Pharrell Williams, as opposed to a rock producer that may rarely contribute as a co-writer of a song.

=== Top-liners ===
A top-line writer or top-liner is a songwriter who usually writes a song over a pre-existing beat. In top-lining, the writer is not creating a song from scratch, but rather creating lyrics and melodies over an existing music genre, tonality, harmony, rhythm, and form of a song. There are exceptions: some top-line writers compose lyrics and melodies a capella, before working with a producer to write a beat or harmony part to accompany the melody.

In modern commercial writing, it is a common practice for the musical track to be produced first without any vocal melody or lyrics. This is partially due to the rise of portable music production equipment and digital audio workstations that are designed for the swift arrangement of electronic music, such as Cubase and Ableton Live.

The top-liner is usually a proficient singer, and will sing over the track as the demo singer. If the song is for a particular artist, the top-liner may sing the demo in that artist's style or hire a session musician for that purpose. Top-liners often work in groups to co-write. Sometimes producers send out tracks to more than one top-line writer so that the producer or singer can choose their preferred option. Since the track is the same, melodies by different writers can be edited and combined. Occasionally, the producer might choose a few lines of melodic or lyrical ideas from one top-liner without properly crediting or paying them. These situations sometimes result in legal battles over ownership of the melodies or lyrics.

Traditionally, a songwriter would prepare a lead sheet for a song, which consists of one or more pieces of sheet music with the melody notes and chord progression indicated on it. This could be used to publish, promote and register the copyright of a song in an archive.

== Multi-tasking songwriters ==
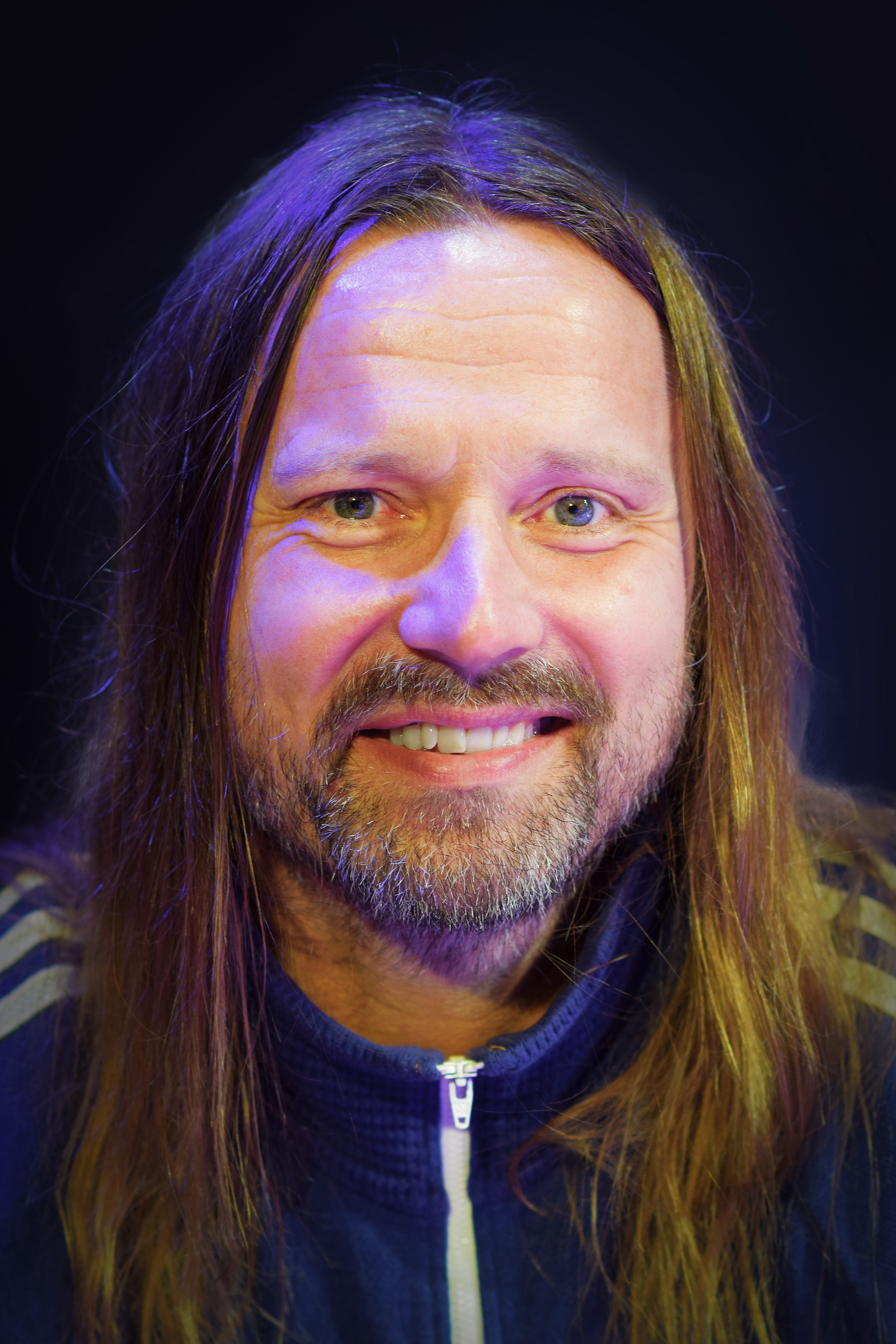
Max Martin is commercially the most successful producer/songwriter in history.

=== As instrumentalists ===
Songwriters are often skilled musical instrument players. In part, this is because the process of "working out" a song or arrangement requires a songwriter to play an instrument, typically the guitar or the piano, to hear how the chord progression sounds and to develop a sense of how well a given set of chords supports a melody. Playing an instrument allows the songwriter to experiment and improvise, making alterations to the tempo, harmony and rhythm of a song as part of the development and writing process.

However, some songwriters rely entirely on digital audio workstations (DAWs) for composition, foregoing playing a traditional harmony instrument. They may only have rudimentary performance skills, using a MIDI interface to play their ideas or drawing the notation using a digital piano roll.

The songwriter may expand upon the main vocal melody and chord progression by adding additional instrumental melodies, hooks, riffs and licks. These may occur before or after the vocal melody, or alongside the vocal melody) and add variety to the song and its structure. An instrumental solo section could also be written by the songwriter, although it is common to allow other musicians to improvise and add their own solos to a song.

In addition to selling their songs and musical concepts for other artists to sing, many songwriter-musicians create songs to perform themselves, either solo or with a band.

=== As producers ===
With recent technological improvements, a songwriter can now create commercially viable music almost entirely on their laptop. This technological advancement has made the producer/songwriter role a much more popular occurrence. Perhaps because the role of producer is not generally understood by the public, the average listener does not know when an artist also takes on the role of producer.

Brian Wilson of the Beach Boys is one of the earliest and most widely known examples of a songwriter turned music producer. Within two years of the band's commercial breakthrough, Wilson had taken over from his father Murry, and he was the sole producer of all their recordings between 1963 and 1967. A more recent example is the singer-songwriter Beyoncé, who is credited as a producer credits for many of her songs.

=== As singers ===
Many singers also write songs for themselves, and as such, they are usually referred to as singer-songwriters.

== Sole writing ==
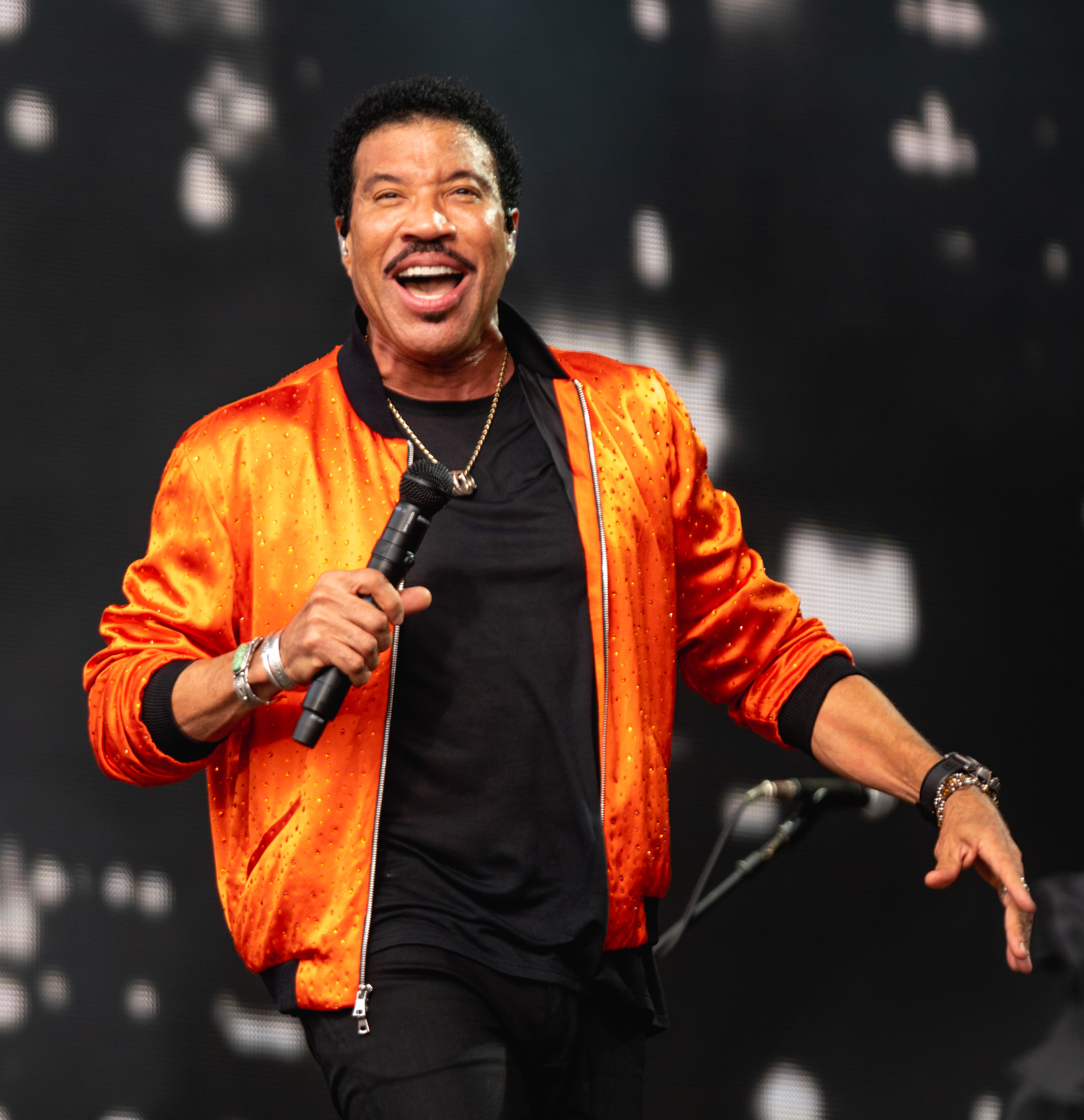
Lionel Richie is the first songwriter to write eight Billboard Hot 100 number-one songs entirely by himself.

In solitary songwriting or sole writing, one person is responsible for creating the entire music and lyrics of a song. According to Billboard, 44% of the songs that reached number one on the Billboard Hot 100 chart during the 1970s were written by just one songwriter. The percentage declined to 42% in the 1980s, 24% in the 1990s, 6% in the 2000s, and 4% in the 2010s.

Lionel Richie and Diane Warren are the only songwriters with at least 8 number-one singles written solely by themselves. A very few artists solely wrote, produced, and performed a Hot 100 number-one song such as Prince ("When Doves Cry"), Debbie Gibson ("Foolish Beat" and "Lost in Your Eyes"), Alicia Keys ("Fallin'"), and Pharrell Williams ("Happy").

== Co-writing ==
Songs can be written jointly or written in collaboration with other songwriters. The first step in co-writing is to establish the division of the contribution between co-writers. In copyright law, there is no distinction of importance between the lyrics of the song or the melody of the song, therefore each writer is given equal ownership over the song, unless another agreement is arranged. "Phantom" songwriters provide small contributions to songs. Examples of this would be a songwriter suggesting a line for a verse or a session musician informally proposing a chord progression for a coda. "Phantom" songwriters are usually not given credit.

Co-writing sessions can be very deliberate and involve parties bringing clearly stated ideas for the genre, theme, mood and structure of the song they wish to right. In contrast to this, writers may use a "stream of consciousness" approach in which ideas are improvised by all parties and the song gradually takes form. This is commonly known as jamming by musicians.

=== Songwriting partnership ===
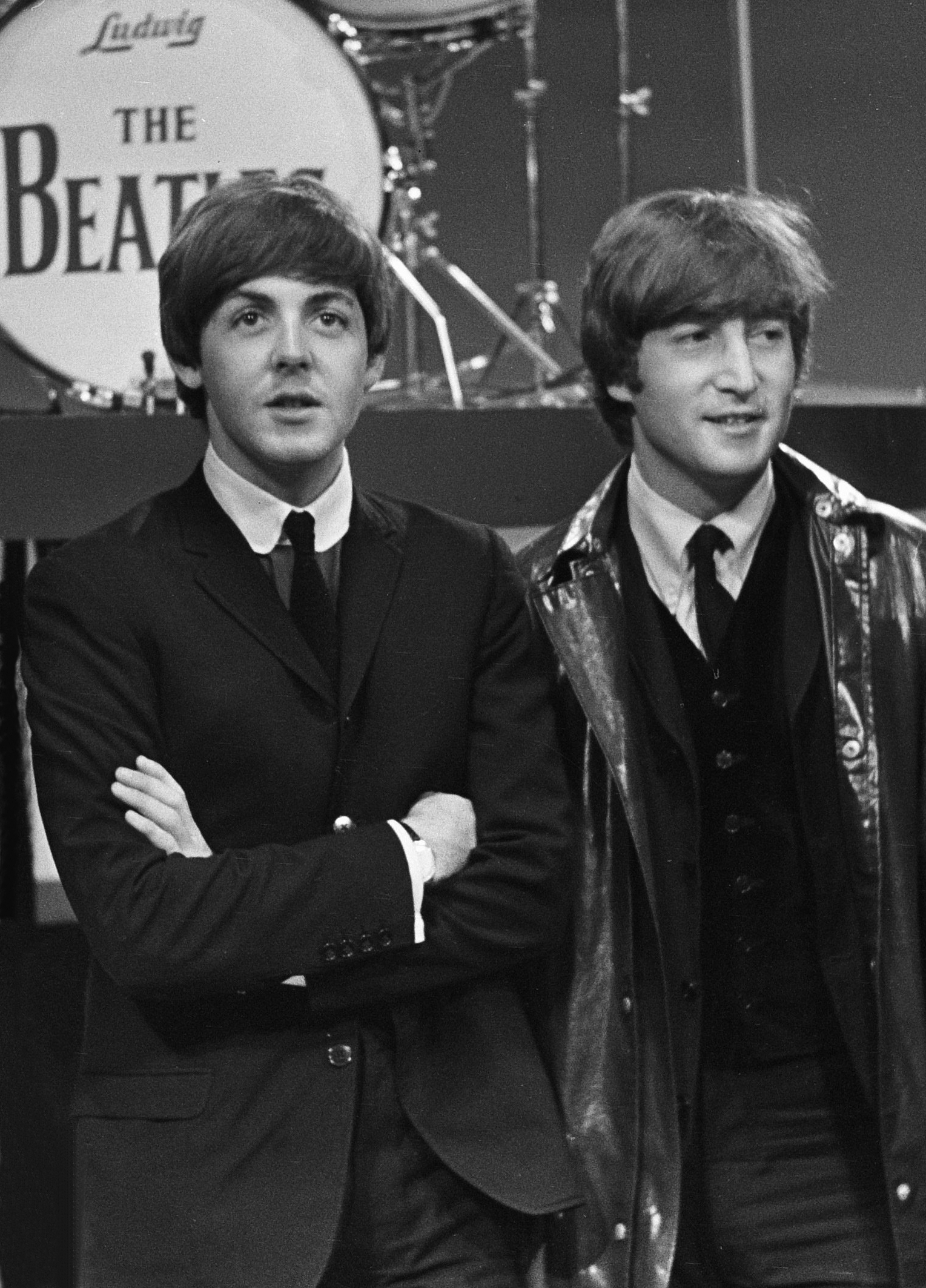
Lennon–McCartney is the most successful songwriting partnership in history.

A songwriting partnership or songwriting duo is a prolific collaboration which consists of two songwriters who usually share 50% of the royalties and credit for the songs they create. Songwriting partnerships can be between a composer and a lyricist (Andrew Lloyd Webber with Tim Rice, or Elton John with Bernie Taupin), a performer and a producer (Madonna with Patrick Leonard or Mariah Carey with Walter Afanasieff), or between bandmates (Mick Jagger and Keith Richards of the Rolling Stones or Björn Ulvaeus and Benny Andersson of ABBA).

According to Billboard, the songwriting partnership between John Lennon and Paul McCartney remains the most successful one of all time, resulting over 180 songs and a record 20 number ones for the Beatles on the Billboard Hot 100. The sibling songwriting partnership between Billie Eilish and Finneas O'Connell has generated multiple wins at the Academy Awards for Best Original Song as well as the Grammy Awards for Song of the Year and Record of the Year.

=== Songwriting camp ===
A songwriting camp is a gathering of multiple producers and topliners in a pre-selected location for the purpose of writing songs: sometimes these songs are for a specific artist, sometimes they are with the aim of producing new material and forging new collaborations. As one of the most successful artists in releasing many hit songs, Rihanna has been known for holding various writing camps to make her albums. Writing camps are also very popular in the K-pop music industry.

=== Sampling ===
Sampling is the reuse of a portion (or sample) of a sound recording from a pre-existing song in a new composition. The original songwriter(s) of a song usually receive a co-writing credit when their work is sampled on another song, although they are not usually involved in the writing process of the new song. For example, Sting is credited as a co-writer alongside Todd Gaither and Faith Evans for "I'll Be Missing You" (1997) due to the sample of "Every Breath You Take" (1983), a song he solely wrote for the Police. However, "I'll Be Missing You" did not have legal approval for the sample before its release, thus Sting sued and received 100% of the song royalties, with payments reportedly going until 2053. Beyoncé's album Lemonade (2016) features as many as 72 co-writers due to use of samples in majority of its tracks.

== See also ==
- Rolling Stone's 100 Greatest Songwriters of All Time
- List of Songwriters Hall of Fame inductees
- Grammy Award for Songwriter of the Year, Non-Classical
