= Ken Kling =

American cartoonist (1895 – 1970)

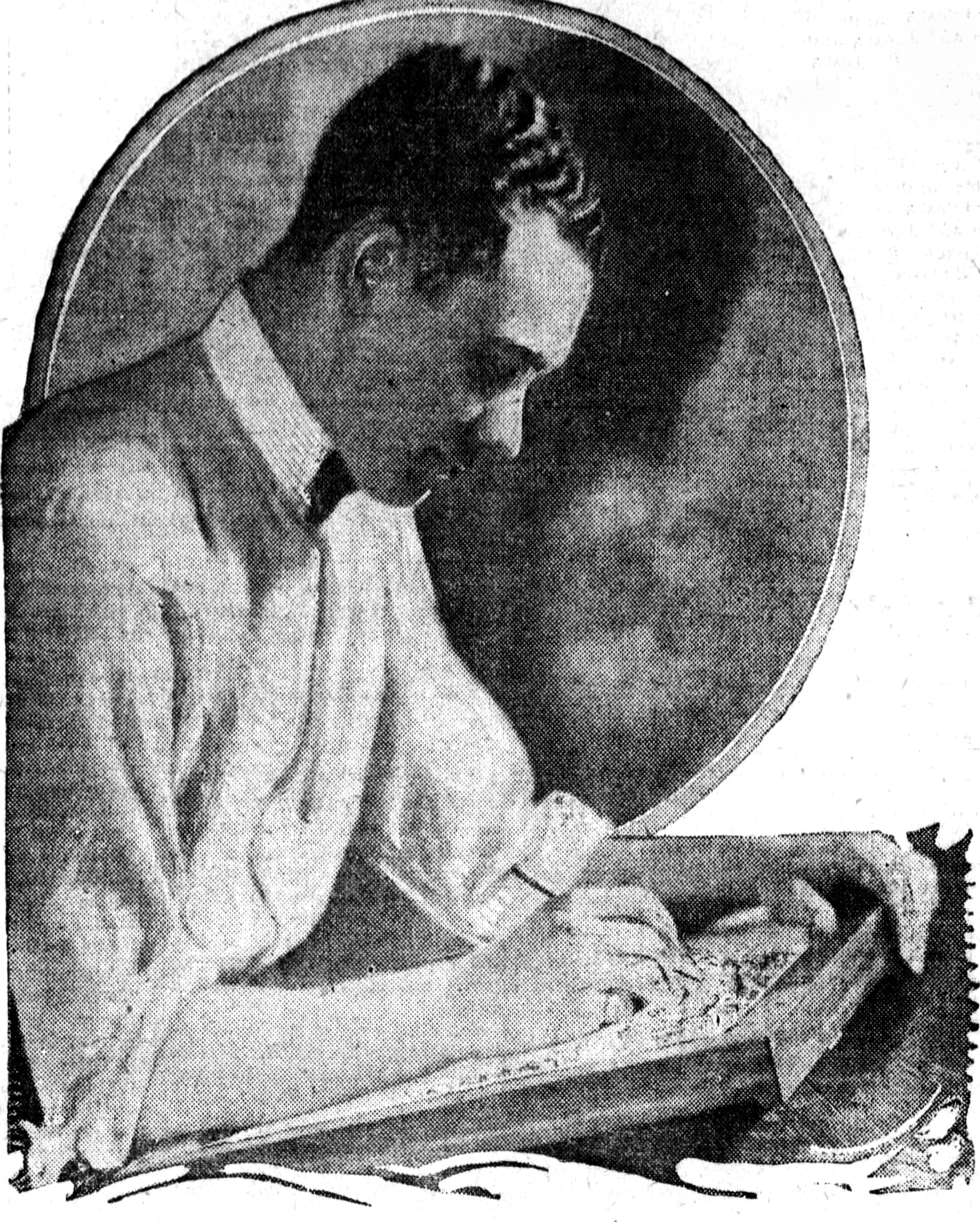
Ken Kling, 1927

Kenneth Lionel Kling (born October 18, 1895, died May 3, 1970) was an American cartoonist and horse-racing tipster, best known for his comic strip Joe and Asbestos.

== Early life ==
Ken Kling was born in 1985 and was raised in Harlem. His father (J. Kling) was an Alsatian butcher who hoped Ken would become an actor. During high school, he ran track, setting a record for the fifty-yard dash. After high school, he worked in a factory making veils.

== Military service ==
Kling enlisted in the Navy during World War I.

== Career ==
Prior to his military service, Kling began his cartooning career as an assistant to Bud Fisher on Mutt and Jeff, initially drawing the shadows cast by the characters, and then later expanding to backgrounds and lettering. After his military service, he began creating his own strips with Fisher's support.

Kling produced five strips during his career:

- Hank and Pete, 1916–1922 (when it was taken over by Ray I. Hoppman)
- Buzz and Snooze, 1918–1919
- Katinka, 1920–1923
- Joe and Asbestos (beginning as Joe Quince, then briefly Joe Quince and Asbestos), 1923–1926, 1932–1968
- Windy Riley, 1927–1932

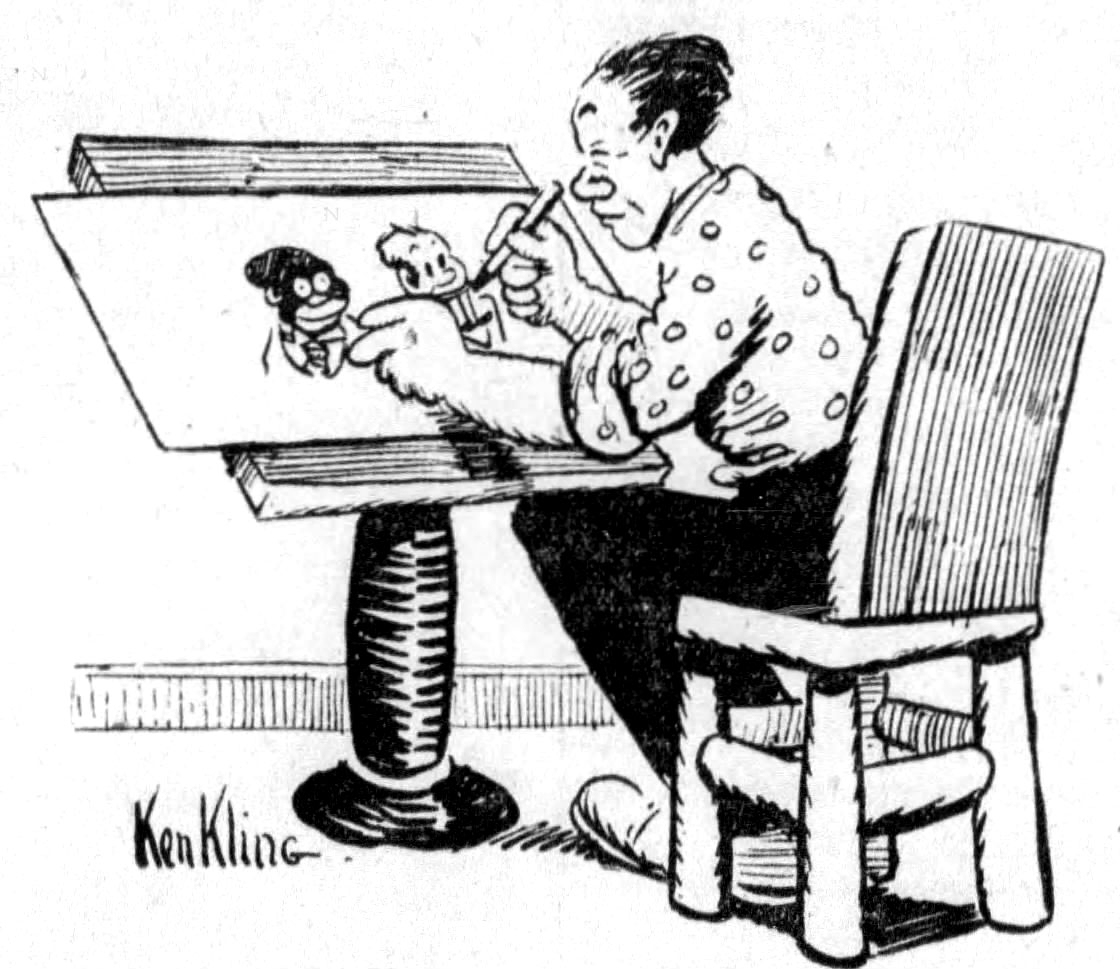
Self-portrait of Ken Kling drawing Joe and Asbestos

Fisher introduced the young cartoonist to horse racing which would shape much of Kling's career and fortune. When the Joe Quince strip – which focused on the waxing and waning financial fortune of a man who quit his job upon inheriting $3,000 – became Joe and Asbestos in 1924, it began focusing heavily on horse racing, including suggestions for good bets. These proved popular with racing fans, particularly when it became clear that Kling was making good suggestions. His method focused not on trying to predict the winner, but on finding longshots that he felt had a better chance of winning than the odds suggested.

Kling retired the strip to focus on Windy Riley, but was drawn back in to relaunch in William Randolph Hearst's New York Daily Mirror, where the horse forecast was the main point. The strip was soon augmented with a form of a weekly tip sheet sold at the race tracks: the daily strip would run its predictions in code, and the tip sheet would have the information needed to decode it. The combination proved popular and profitable.

Newspapers would pay large amounts to have 300-mile exclusives on running the strip, which meant that the strip had few outlets but was very profitable. Adding to the profits was the fact that, while the original run of the strip had been syndicated by the Bell Syndicate, Kling self-syndicated the second run, increasing his share of the earnings.

With his reputation in horse racing secured, Kling wrote two books on the topic: 1941's Stuff About Steeds and 1948's How I Pick the Winners. In 1946, Life magazine called him the "most widely read and respected turf expert in the country". In 1958, Sports Illustrated referred to him as "the most successful public handicapper".

He worked on adapting Joe and Asbestos to other media, co-writing the book for a stage musical and voicing one of the characters in a proposed radio series. He also provided the story for Windy Riley Goes Hollywood, a two-reel film based on his comic strip.

== Personal life ==
Kling became engaged to Mayme Cohen in 1921, and they married the following year. She would survive him, dying in 1979. They had two sons, Ken Kling Junior and television writer and producer Heywood "Woody" Kling. At the time of his death on May 3, 1970, he had three grandchildren. His last request was that his pallbearers be beautiful women.
