= Woody Kling =

American dramatist

- Born: Heywood Fisher Kling; April 14, 1925; New York City, New York, U.S.
- Died: April 10, 1988 (aged 62); Los Angeles, California, U.S.
- Occupations: Television writer; television producer; playwright; composer
- Years active: 1948–1986

Woody Kling (April 14, 1925 – April 10, 1988) was an American television writer, producer, playwright, and composer.

== Biography ==
=== Early life ===
Born Heywood Fisher Kling in New York City, Kling was the son of Mayme and Ken Kling. Ken was a cartoonist who predicted horse races in his strip Joe and Asbestos. Woody Kling was given the middle name Fisher in tribute to Ken Kling's former employer and still friend Bud Fisher, who created the first successful daily comic strip in the United States.

=== Career ===
In the 1940s, Ken and Mayme Kling hosted celebrity parties at their home at The Eldorado building in New York City. At one of those parties, Woody Kling, then only in his 20s, met the vaudeville star Milton Berle. Berle told a joke, at which Kling did not laugh. When questioned by Berle as to what was wrong, Kling said the joke wasn't told in the right way, and retold it in his own style. Upon Kling receiving the laughs of the entire party, Berle hired Kling on the spot to produce, head write and create the theme song for a new television show in which Berle would be starring. Called The Texaco Star Theatre Starring Milton Berle, the show was created by Berle, produced live before a New York audience on kinescopes owned by Berle, but with the scripts and music owned by Kling. The show's theme song was the broadcasting creation of the modern jingle. The theme song, called "We Are the Men of Texaco", and written by Kling and Buddy Arnold, was the first time that a television program used music to promote a commercial advertiser's product.

In the decades that followed, "We are the Men of Texaco" and the way it was staged – sung by four gas station attendants (Kling's idea) – was licensed by Kling's heirs to filmmakers wishing to depict the impact of television's advent on the American family (like Barry Levinson's 1990s film Avalon). The song also served as Milton Berle's theme for personal appearances. In 1979, Dan Aykroyd, John Belushi and Garret Morris recreated Kling's staging and sung "We Are the Men of Texaco" live on Saturday Night Live in honor of Berle, its host that week. The song's lyrics were quoted in obituaries of Berle.

=== 1950s to 1960s ===
Kling soon became the head writer on a number of television shows like The Jack Paar Show, The Will Rogers, Jr. Show, and The Red Buttons Show. He additionally created and wrote several dozen cartoon programs at Hal Seeger Studios.

In 1968, Kling was producer of the program Wedding Party. Thereafter, he became head writer on The Jackie Gleason Show in Palm Beach, Florida. The hit show for Gleason became the first hit television shows to be broadcast from Florida. Finally, in late 1969, Kling moved to Hollywood, California where he wrote for Joseph Barbera the filmed television show Love, American Style.

=== 1970s ===
Kling thereafter was quickly hired for The Carol Burnett Show where he became head writer. While on Burnett, producer Norman Lear offered Kling the position of head writer on a new emerging show called All in the Family. Ironically, Lear had offered the starring role in the show to Kling's previous star Gleason, and then to Mickey Rooney, who 12 months later toured the country with a play written by Kling.

Under Kling, All in the Family became a huge hit for CBS and Lear. Kling drew some of the show's most memorable episodes from his personal life. They included the February 23, 1976 episode "Joey's Baptism" in which Archie Bunker had his grandson baptized (against the wishes of agnostic parents Mike and Gloria), which Kling, who was born atheist, based upon the baptism of his son Anthony at the time.

In less than half a decade, Burnett and All in the Family brought Kling seven Emmy nominations, and two Emmy Awards.

Kling helped create the introduction of the spin-off The Jeffersons, and wrote or head wrote Lear shows Maude, Good Times, and Sanford Arms among others while turning down other Lear shows like One Day at a Time.

=== Playwright ===
Kling and fellow Gleason show writer Robert J. Hilliard wrote the 1971 play Three Goats and a Blanket (which also played as The Laugh's On Me; Stop, Thief, Stop!; and Alimony), in which a TV producer moves in with his ex-wife when he can no longer afford to pay alimony. Over the next decade, the show, touring with Mickey Rooney, became the highest grossing play to never reach Broadway.

=== Cartoons ===
Between television film shows, Kling reunited with and wrote for Joe Barbera a series of cartoon series including Casper the Friendly Ghost and the Harlem Globetrotters. In 1983, he created and wrote the series The Littles and thereafter wrote the syndicated special Cabbage Patch Kids First Christmas.

In the 1980s, Kling wrote and created the program Rainbow Brite that he licensed, solely for television syndication broadcast only. After Kling's death, his heirs sued Hallmark Cards, for copyright infringement of Kling's property alleging that Hallmark had stolen Kling's property making Hallmark over $1 billion during his illness and thereafter. Kling's case went up on appeal twice to the 9th Circuit Court of Appeals in California. In the first appeal (Kling v. Hallmark), Kling's heir won. The court found against Hallmark, ruling Kling's case was not barred by laches, becoming the leading decision on laches still today of the Court. In a second appeal (Kling v. Hallmark), the 9th Circuit found for Kling's heir, ruling Kling's heir to be the copyright owner of Woody Kling's Rainbow Brite works, but found Kling's damages to be barred by the statute of limitations, awarding Klings' heirs no money.

=== Death ===
Shortly after creating Rainbow Brite, Kling became ill with inoperable brain and lung cancer, eventually dying in Los Angeles on April 10, 1988. He was survived by his wife, Mary, and his son, Anthony.
