= James Neff =

American nonfiction author and investigative journalist

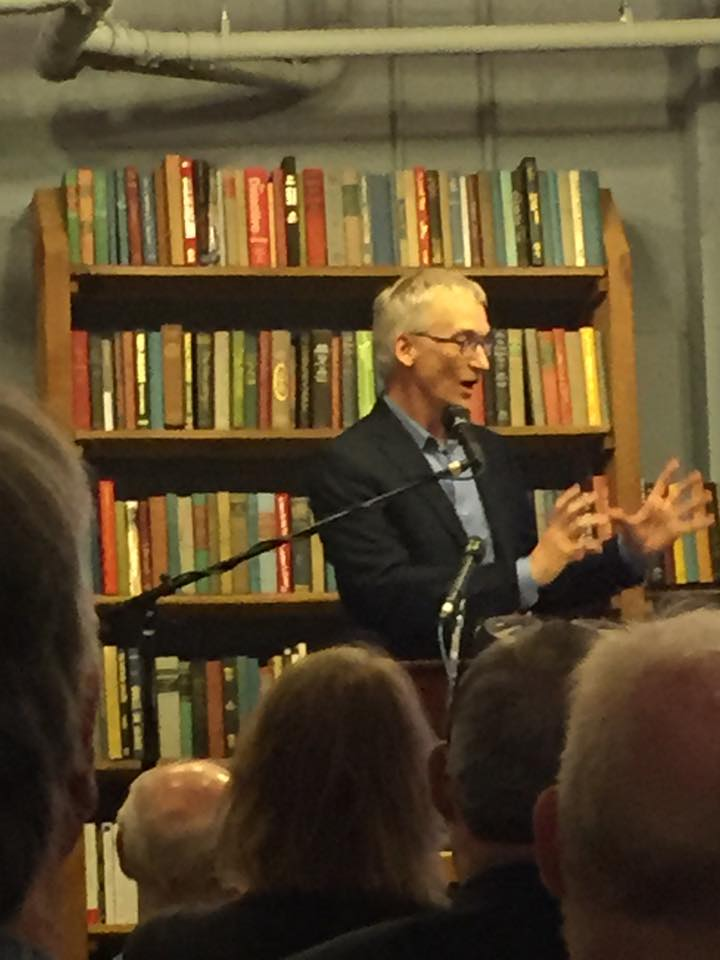
- Born: United States
- Occupations: Author, investigative journalist, editor
- Writing career
- Genre: Non-fiction

James Neff is an American non-fiction author and investigative journalist. He is a managing editor for the Oregon Journalism Project. His most recent work Vendetta: Bobby Kennedy versus Jimmy Hoffa, was published by Little, Brown and Company in July 2015.

== Early life and education ==
Neff is a graduate of the University of Notre Dame and has a master's degree in American Civilization from the University of Texas at Austin.

== Career ==
Neff was a reporter at the Austin American-Statesman and at the Cleveland Plain Dealer in his hometown. He was a local columnist at the Plain Dealer from 1981 to 1986. Some of his columns were collected into City Beat: Stories from the Heart of Cleveland.

His 1989 biography of Teamsters president Jackie Presser, Mobbed Up: Jackie Presser's High-Wire Life in the Teamsters, the Mafia, and the FBI, was adapted into the HBO movie Teamster Boss.

In 1995, Neff's third book, Unfinished Murder: The Capture of a Serial Rapist was published. This account of the investigation, capture, and conviction of serial rapist Ronnie Shelton, known in Cleveland as the West Side Rapist, was praised for its insight into the damage inflicted upon the victims of this violent man.

Neff was the Willard M. Kiplinger Chair in Public Affairs Reporting in Ohio State University School of Journalism and Communication from 1994 to 1999. In this position, he supervised the Kiplinger Mid-Career Program in Public Affairs Reporting, an interdisciplinary year-long program awarding master's degrees to journalists who break from their careers for an intensive study of public affairs reporting.

Neff spent several years re-investigating the Dr. Sam Sheppard murder case for his next book, The Wrong Man: The Final Verdict on the Dr. Sam Sheppard Murder Case. He located police reports and grand jury transcripts from the 1950s that were previously unavailable. He concluded that Dr. Sam Sheppard did not kill his wife Marilyn in July 1954.

When, in 2000, Sam Reese Sheppard, son of the late Dr. Sheppard, sued the state of Ohio claiming his father was wrongfully imprisoned for Marilyn Sheppard's murder, county prosecutors in Cleveland, Ohio, subpoenaed all of Neff's research for his book in an attempt to shore up its case that Sheppard was guilty. The subpoena was successfully defeated with the help of First Amendment lawyer David Marburger.

Neff was interviewed on the cable program, "A Crime to Remember: The Wrong Man," a retrospective look at the Marilyn Sheppard murder which aired in December, 2015, on the Investigations Discovery Channel.

Neff has been a board member and past president of Investigative Reporters and Editors, Inc. (IRE) from 1991 through 2002. Through IRE, he has published several "tip sheets" for investigative reporters on finding information in a hurry, backgrounding, and finding and using archival documents.

In 2001, Neff became the investigations editor at the Seattle Times. In March, 2016, Neff was named assistant managing editor of investigations.

On June 1, 2016, Neff became the assistant managing editor for Investigations/Projects for the Philadelphia Media Network. In 2017, Neff was named deputy managing editor.

In 2016, Neff served on the jury selecting the Pulitzer Prize for Public Service reporting. In 2017, Neff served as chair of the jurors selecting the Pulitzer Prize in Investigative Reporting.

In April 2025, Neff joined the Oregon Journalism Project as a Managing Editor. The Oregon Journalism Project is a nonprofit investigative journalism newsroom created in 2024 to cover state and local government in Oregon.

== Works ==
- City Beat: Stories from the Heart of Cleveland (Zubal, 1984) ISBN 9780939738557
- Mobbed Up: Jackie Presser's High-Wire Life in the Teamsters, the Mafia, and the FBI (Atlantic Monthly Press, 1989) ISBN 978-0871133441
- Unfinished Murder: The Capture of a Serial Rapist (Pocket Books, 1995) ISBN 978-0743460552
- The Wrong Man: The Final Verdict on the Dr. Sam Sheppard Murder Case (Random House, 2001) ISBN 978-0679457190
- Vendetta: Bobby Kennedy versus Jimmy Hoffa (Little, Brown and Company, 2015) ISBN 978-0316738347

== Awards ==
Mobbed Up, published by Atlantic Monthly Press (1989), won the Thomas Renner award from Investigative Reporters & Editors for the year's best reporting on organized crime.

In 1996, Neff was an Edgar Award nominee for Best Fact Crime Book for Unfinished Murder.

Neff was lead writer for the 18-part series, “The Terrorist Within", which was a finalist for the Pulitzer Prize for investigative reporting in 2003.
