= Joe and Asbestos =

Comic strip by Ken Kling

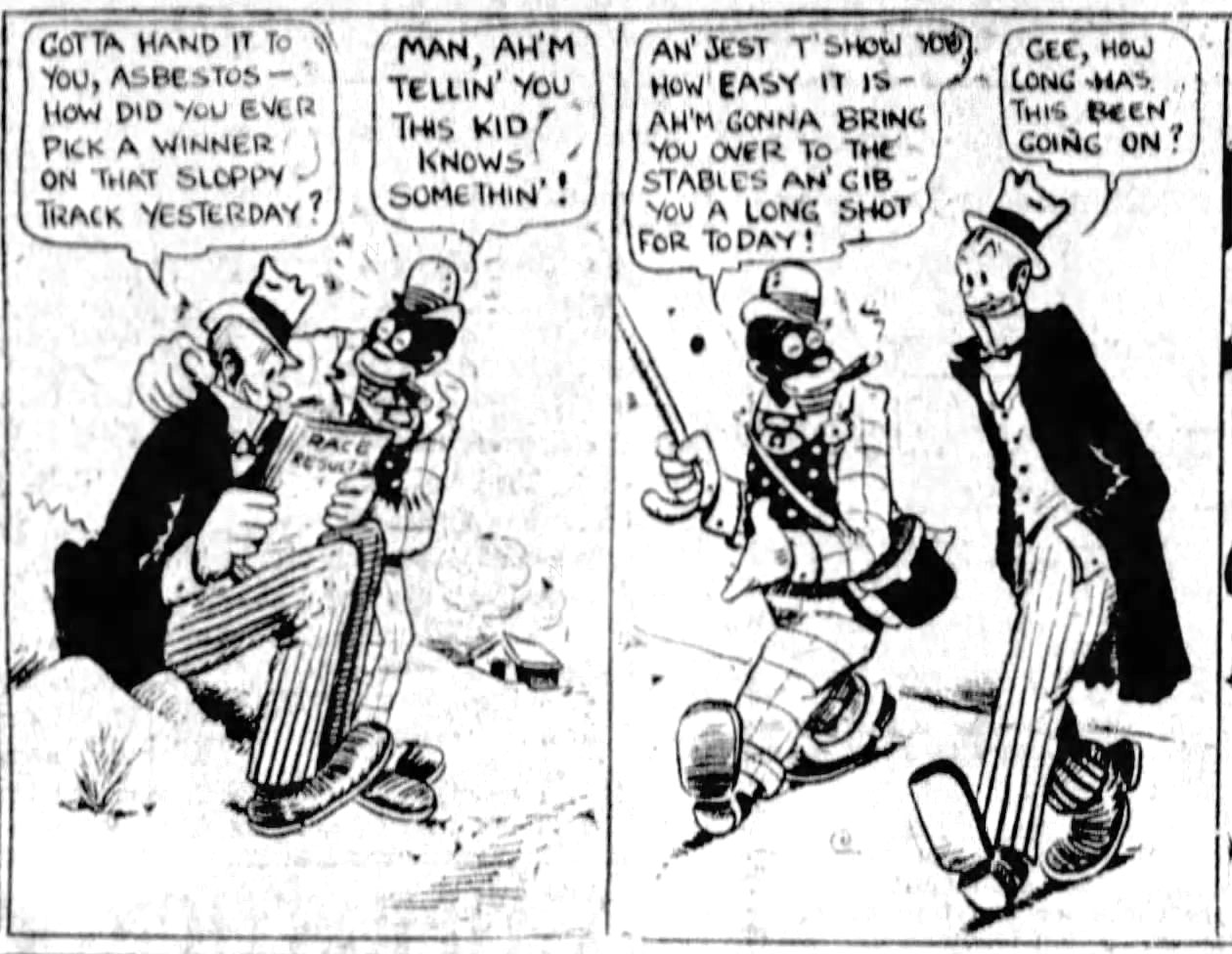

Joe and Asbestos (originally titled Joe Quince and briefly Joe Quince and Asbestos) is an American daily newspaper comic strip created by Ken Kling. The strip, which focused on horse racing, ran from 1923 to 1926, then returned to run again from 1931 to 1968. After Kling's death, the strip was revived by other hands in 1971, ending in 1972. The strip is noted for having an African-American title character (Asbestos), drawn primarily in a style then and now seen as racist. Its popularity was due to the inclusion of horse race wagering tips for most of its run, tips that proved to be rather successful.

== History ==
The series began in 1923 under the title Joe Quince. Quince was a shop clerk who had inherited $3000, quit his job, and immediately set about trying to build his fortune through investments, gambling, and whatever other opportunities offered themselves. When the character Asbestos was added in 1924, it was initially in a set of strips just for the Baltimore Sun, rather than the syndicated version that ran simultaneously. When Asbestos, who worked in the stalls at the race track, became Joe's partner in trying to get rich through wagering on horse races, he was immediately made a title character. Publication in a single outlet allowed Kling to have them actually select horses to bet on in each day's races, and report the pair's winnings or losings the next day, keep tracking of their running total for the year. Kling proved to have a knack for picking winners. This version of the strip soon spread to other papers. Due to the delays involved in syndication of the art and the fact that racing lineups were not set long in advance, the papers would receive versions of the strip with some blank text areas, and would receive a call each day telling them what text to add to show the pair's picks for the day, as well as the results of the previous picks, to be handwritten into the space.

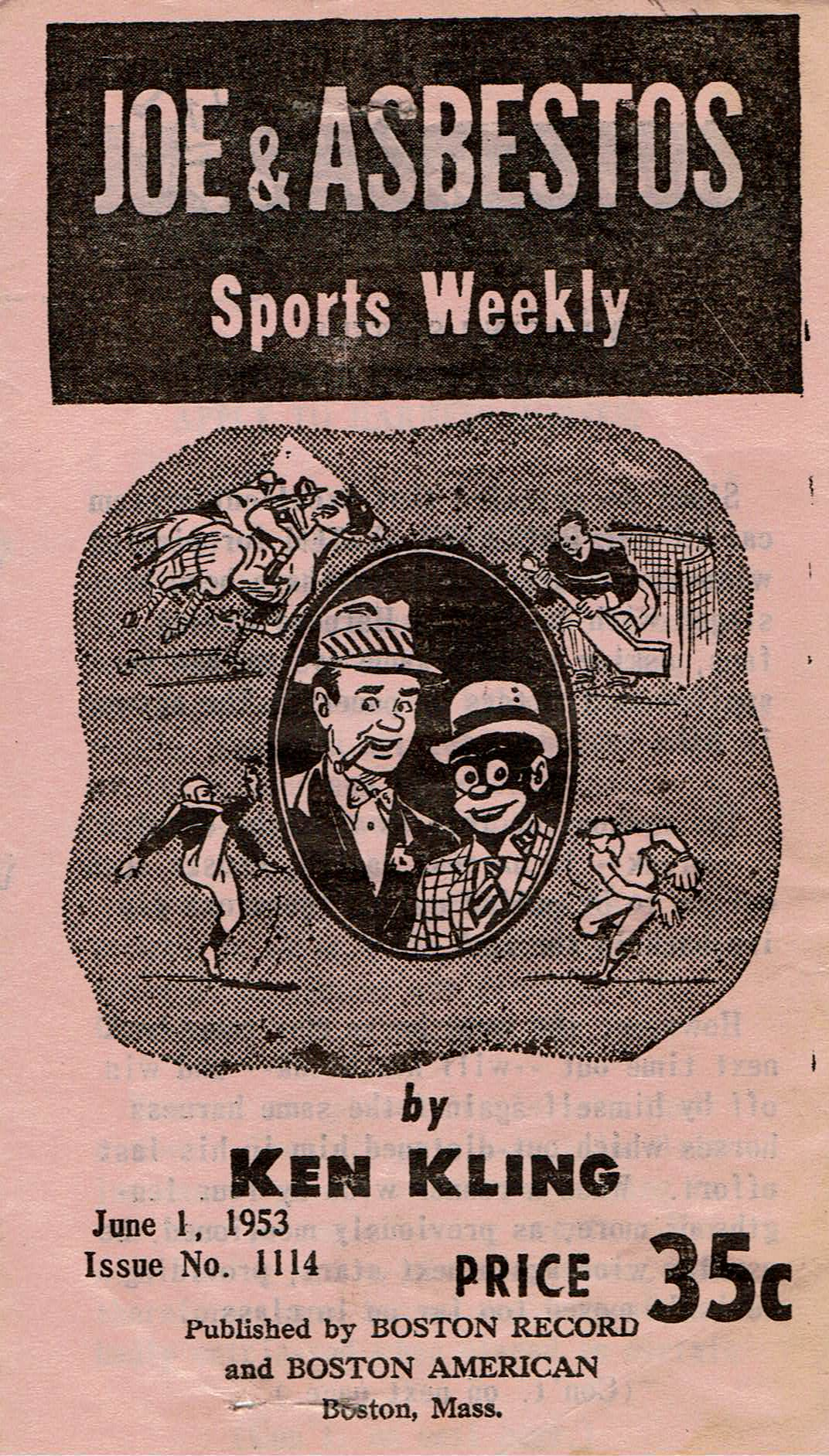
Cover to an issue of the tip sheet.

Kling tired of the strip and dropped it for another creation, Windy Riley, in 1927. Gamblers continued to look for hidden tips in the new strip, even though Kling wasn't putting them there. In 1932, The New York Daily Mirror arranged to bring the strip back, which proved quite profitable. The number of papers the strip appeared in was limited (in 1948, it was 7 papers) because newspapers near race tracks would pay high amounts to get an exclusive for a 300 mile radius, knowing that gamblers would gladly pay for the paper to get the tips. The tips became encoded, and you had to buy the weekly Joe & Asbestos tip sheet to understand all of the daily tips.

In 1937, it was estimated that $3 million was bet daily on the strip's tips.

In 1963, the character of Asbestos was redesigned to look more human and less like a derogatory caricature, at the encouragement of the Congress on Racial Equality. Ponchitta Pierce in Ebony noted that "Asbestos may have looked bad but he was treated well."

The strip ended in 1968, and Kling died in 1970. The strip was revived for a new newspaper reusing the New York Daily Mirror name in 1971, but ended with the cancelation of that paper in 1972.

== Adaptations ==
In 1932, the Joe and Asbestos characters appeared in a vaudeville revue.

A series of short comedy films starring Eddie Green as Asbestos and Harry Gribbon as Joe were made in the late 1930s. Titles include:

- "A Horse's Tale" (released January 8, 1937): Asbestos and Joe take an injured horse and restore him to winning status
- "Under the Wire" (released March 26, 1937): the pair rig an electronic device to accelerate their horse
- "Boarder Trouble" (released November, 1938): Joe offers to marry his landlady if his horse loses a race.

A five-minute daily radio feature was planned in 1944, sponsored by Adam Hats. While the show would've been distributed to radio stations on records prepared well in advance, it was intended that a horse pick be cabled to each station each day, for a local announced to add to the program. The voice of the title characters were to be performed by Kling and Gus Van. They were facing legal concern about whether betting tips would be legal on the radio.

In the late 1940s, Kling and Frank Marcus co-wrote the book for a two-act musical stage production of Joe and Asbestos, with music by Marcus and Jeffrey Wing.

In 1955, the rights to the feature for telefilms were licensed.
