= Grafton Correctional Institution =

Prison in Ohio, United States

Coordinates: 41°16′44″N 82°01′41″W

- Interactive map of Grafton Correctional Institution
- Location: 2500 South Avon Belden Road Grafton, Ohio
- Status: open
- Security class: minimum and medium
- Capacity: 2074
- Opened: 1988
- Managed by: Ohio Department of Rehabilitation and Correction

The Grafton Correctional Institution is a state prison for men located in Grafton, Lorain County, Ohio, owned and operated by the Ohio Department of Rehabilitation and Correction.

The facility was opened in 1988 and houses a maximum of 2,074 inmates at a mix of minimum and medium security levels.

On August 11, 2026, 19 inmates were injured after being struck by lightning while on the prison yard. Three inmates lost consciousness, while 16 were hospitalized. Two inmates lost their pulses and were resuscitated by corrections staff before being transported to a hospital.

== Notable inmates ==
- Ronnie Shelton – Serial rapist; died by suicide in 2018.
- Daniel Petric – Murderer of his mother and attempted murderer of his father.
- Timothy A. Combs – convicted and sentenced to life imprisonment for the murder of Raymond Fife. Died in prison in 2018.
