= Daniel Petric =

American murderer (born 1991)

Daniel Petrić
- Born: August 24, 1991 (age 35)
- Occupation: Student
- Parent(s): Mark and Susan Petrić
- Status: Incarcerated
- Motive: Video game addiction; anger towards parents for confiscating video game
- Convictions: Aggravated murder Attempted aggravated murder Tampering with evidence
- Penalty: 23 years to life imprisonment

Details
- Date: October 20, 2007
- Country: United States
- Locations: Brighton Township, Lorain County, Ohio
- Targets: Mark and Susan Petrić
- Killed: Susan Petrić (his mother)
- Injured: Mark Petrić (his father)
- Weapon: 9mm Taurus PT92
- Date apprehended: October 20, 2007
- Imprisoned at: Grafton Correctional Institution, Grafton, Ohio

Daniel Petrić (Serbian Cyrillic: Данијел Петрић; born August 24, 1991) is an American convicted murderer from Wellington, Ohio. At age 16, he shot his parents after his father confiscated his copy of the then-recently released Halo 3, a video game his parents forbade him from playing. His mother died, but his father recovered. He is incarcerated for life, with a chance for parole. Studies of video game addiction or the effects of violent video games on society, as well as gun control, often mention Petrić.

== Background ==
Petrić was born on August 24, 1991, to Mark Petrić, a Pentecostal minister, and Susan Petrić. He lived in Brighton Township with his parents and attended high school in nearby Wellington. Following a skiing injury, Petrić contracted a staphylococcus infection and was housebound for a year. During this time, he was introduced to the Halo video game series. Petrić quickly became addicted to the games, often playing for "seven or eight hours a day" at his friend Jonathan Johnson's house.

When Petrić's father insisted that he leave home if he could not curtail his gaming, Petrić moved in with Johnson for a weekend, playing Halo for up to eighteen hours a day. Eventually, Petrić bought his own copy of the newly released Halo 3 without his father's knowledge, but Mark soon caught him with the game and confiscated it, placing it in a safe that also contained a nine-millimeter (9mm) Taurus PT92 handgun.

== Shooting ==
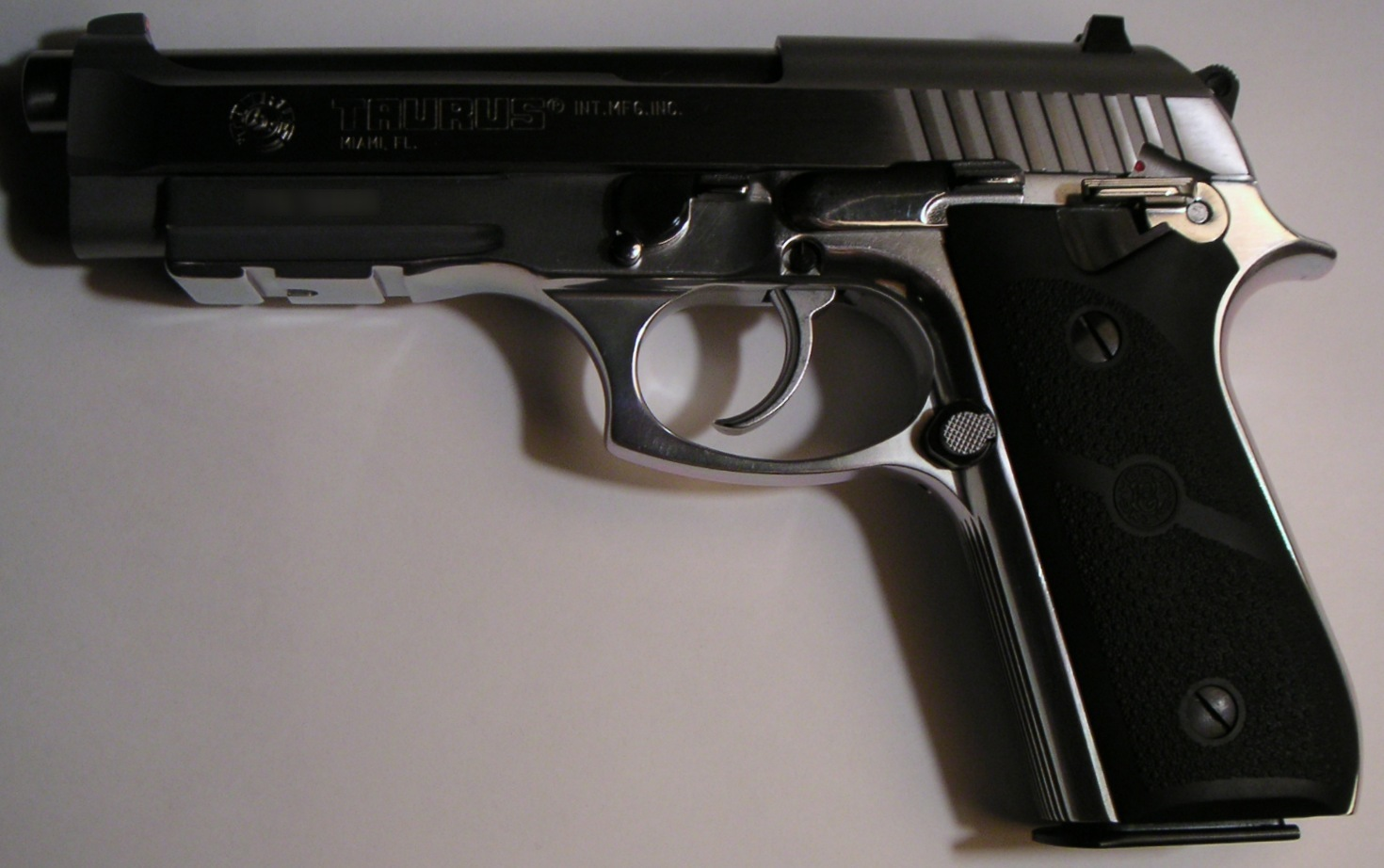
A Taurus PT92, similar to the one used by Daniel Petric

On October 20, 2007, Petrić found the key to the safe, from which he then removed the game and the gun. Around 7:00 p.m., he came up behind his parents while they were sitting on a couch and shot them. Susan Petrić died from wounds in the head, arms, and chest. In an attempt to stage the shooting as a murder-suicide, Petrić placed the gun in his father's hand. At 7:00 p.m., Petrić's sister, Heidi Archer, arrived at the house with her husband. Petrić refused to let the couple in, claiming that the parents were fighting, but the couple forced their way in after hearing Mark's groans from inside. Petrić fled in the family van, but police pursued and apprehended him.

== Trial ==
Petrić's trial was held from December 15 to 17, 2008 at the Lorain County Court of Common Pleas in Elyria, Ohio; Petrić elected a bench trial.

At the trial, Petrić was seen crying. His father was supportive and said Petrić deeply regretted what he had done.

=== Prosecution case ===
The prosecutor, Anthony Cillo, portrayed Petrić as a heartless killer. He showed no remorse for his actions, so he claimed, and tried to set up the shooting as a suicide. He had planned his crime carefully, knowing that Heidi Archer and her husband planned to enter the house at 9 PM, but his plot was foiled when they arrived two hours early. In a psychological report ordered by the defense, Petrić had informed the psychologist that he had planned the murder of his parents for a week.

=== Defense case ===
James Kersey represented Petrić as the defense attorney. Neither Kersey nor Petrić attempted to dispute the facts of the crime; instead, Kersey argued for the insanity defense, video game addiction being the underlying psychiatric condition. Because of the enormous amount of stress put on him due to his severe infection and resultant spinal injury, Petrić was much more susceptible to being influenced by the game, not to mention his youth. Petrić, he claimed, was not in the right state of mind to understand the finality of shooting his parents. In other words, he had been playing violent video games so long that he did not realize that real-life death is permanent. The levels of video games can be replayed over and over again; killed and injured characters, including the player himself, return to their original states at every reset. Petrić, he continued, must have expected that his mother would eventually return to a healthy and normal state, having been immersed in virtual violence so long.

Kersey disputed the prosecution's assertions about Petrić's personality, using the testimony of Petrić's family, friends, and acquaintances to contend that he was a typical teenager. The young Petrić's addiction was strong enough for him take along a video game of all things while fleeing. To Kersey, Petrić was not a plotting murderer, but someone who spontaneously killed without planning. The defense did not present psychologists for an expert opinion on the mental effects of violent video games.

=== Conviction ===
Petrić was convicted for aggravated murder, attempted aggravated murder, and tampering with evidence. Due to his age, Petrić could not be sentenced to death. The judge sentenced him to life in prison with the possibility of parole after 23 years, which was the minimum sentence. The maximum sentence Petrić faced was life in prison without parole, recommended by the prosecuting attorney.

== Aftermath ==
The case has been highlighted in papers and articles regarding video game addiction and video game violence. Halo 3 publisher Microsoft commented briefly to the media, "We are aware of the situation and it is a tragic case." Petrić is currently serving his sentence at Grafton Correctional Institution and will be eligible for parole in 2030.
