= Ronnie Shelton =

American serial rapist (1961–2018)

- Shelton c. 1989
- Born: October 1, 1961; United States
- Died: September 25, 2018 (aged 56); Grafton Correctional Institution, Grafton, Ohio, U.S.
- Criminal charges: Rape; Aggravated burglary; Felonious assault; Gross sexual imposition; Kidnapping; Intimidation; Theft; Aggravated robberies; Cutting telephone lines
- Penalty: 3,195 years

Ronald Shelton (October 1, 1961 – September 25, 2018), better known as The West Side Rapist, was an American convicted serial rapist. He was convicted of raping over 30 women in Cleveland, Ohio, from 1983 to 1988. He may have raped up to 50 women. Shelton was caught on video using an ATM with his victims' bank cards.

He was the subject of the book Unfinished Murder: The Pursuit of a Serial Rapist by James Neff.

== Crimes ==
Shelton's modus operandi was to break into victims' homes wearing something to obscure his face. He would initially tell victims he was going to rob them, but then rape them. He would insist victims not look at him and threaten them if they reported him to police. His language and pattern of sexual assaults helped link his crimes.

== Trial ==
Timothy J. McGinty prosecuted the case in 1989. Shelton was found guilty of 220 charges, including 49 rapes of over 30 women in Cleveland, Ohio. Richard McMonagle sentenced him to between 1,554 and 3,195 years in prison. He received the longest sentence in Ohio's history.

== Death ==
On September 25, 2018, at 4:30pm Shelton, aged 56, jumped from the top of a prison building, suffering a skull fracture upon impact with the concrete below. He was pronounced dead at 8:15 pm at nearby MetroHealth Medical Center. Investigators did not suspect foul play.
