= Tip sheet =

Publication that imparts the latest on a particular industry

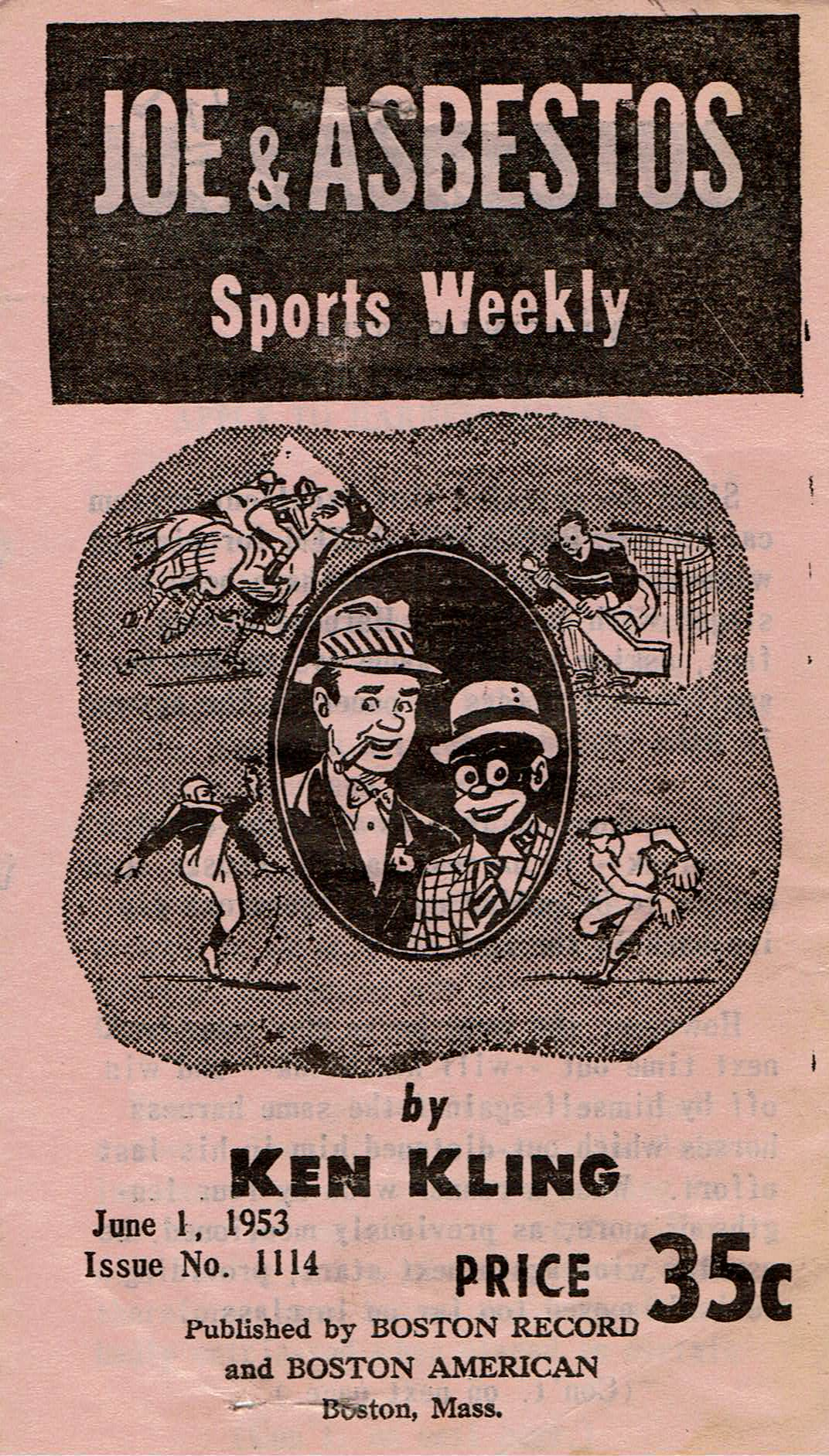
Joe & Asbestos Sports Weekly was a long-running horse racing tip sheet.

A tip sheet is a publication containing the latest information, tips or predictions for a particular industry. Tip sheets are commonly published to impart business or stock market information, music industry songwriter leads, and tips on horse racing results.

== Types of tip sheet ==
In the financial sector tip sheet newsletters offer investors' advice on stocks. In the UK, tip sheets are regulated by the Financial Conduct Authority (FCA) since 2010 to prevent malpractice. Prior to 2010, Financial Service Authority (FSA) regulated tipsheets.

Media tip sheets are typically lists of tips on how to do something, or solve a particular problem, that are printed in newspapers and magazines and appear on television. An example tip sheet might be titled "8 Tax Tips the IRS Wishes You Didn't Know". They offer their creators free publicity and provide media outlets with free ready-made content, which they can reprint verbatim.

== Music tip sheets ==
A music tip sheet, or song tip sheet, is a research service that regularly publishes information about which recording artists and film and TV projects are looking for music, along with the appropriate contact information. They are used by songwriters, publishers and record producers, but most commonly by new songwriters looking to gain a foothold in the industry. Songwriter, publisher and "respected music industry veteran" Eric Beall said that "If I were going to spend money on anything when I started out as a songwriter, other than the actual demos, I would put it into tip sheets."

Established music tip sheets include "RowFax", the MusicRow publication, and SongQuarters.
