= Ohio State Route 774 =

State highway in southwestern Ohio, US

State Route 774

Route information
- Maintained by ODOT
- Length: 14.93 mi (24.03 km)
- Existed: 1938–present

Major junctions
- West end: SR 133 / CR 56 near Felicity
- East end: US 68 near Mount Orab

Location
- Country: United States
- State: Ohio
- Counties: Clermont, Brown

Highway system
- Ohio State Highway System; Interstate; US; State; Scenic
← SR 773	→ SR 775

State Route 774 (SR 774) is an east–west state highway in the southwestern part of the U.S. state of Ohio. The route runs from its western terminus at SR 133 approximately 2 miles (3.2 km) north of Felicity to its eastern terminus at US 68 nearly 2 miles (3.2 km) south of Mount Orab.

== Route description ==
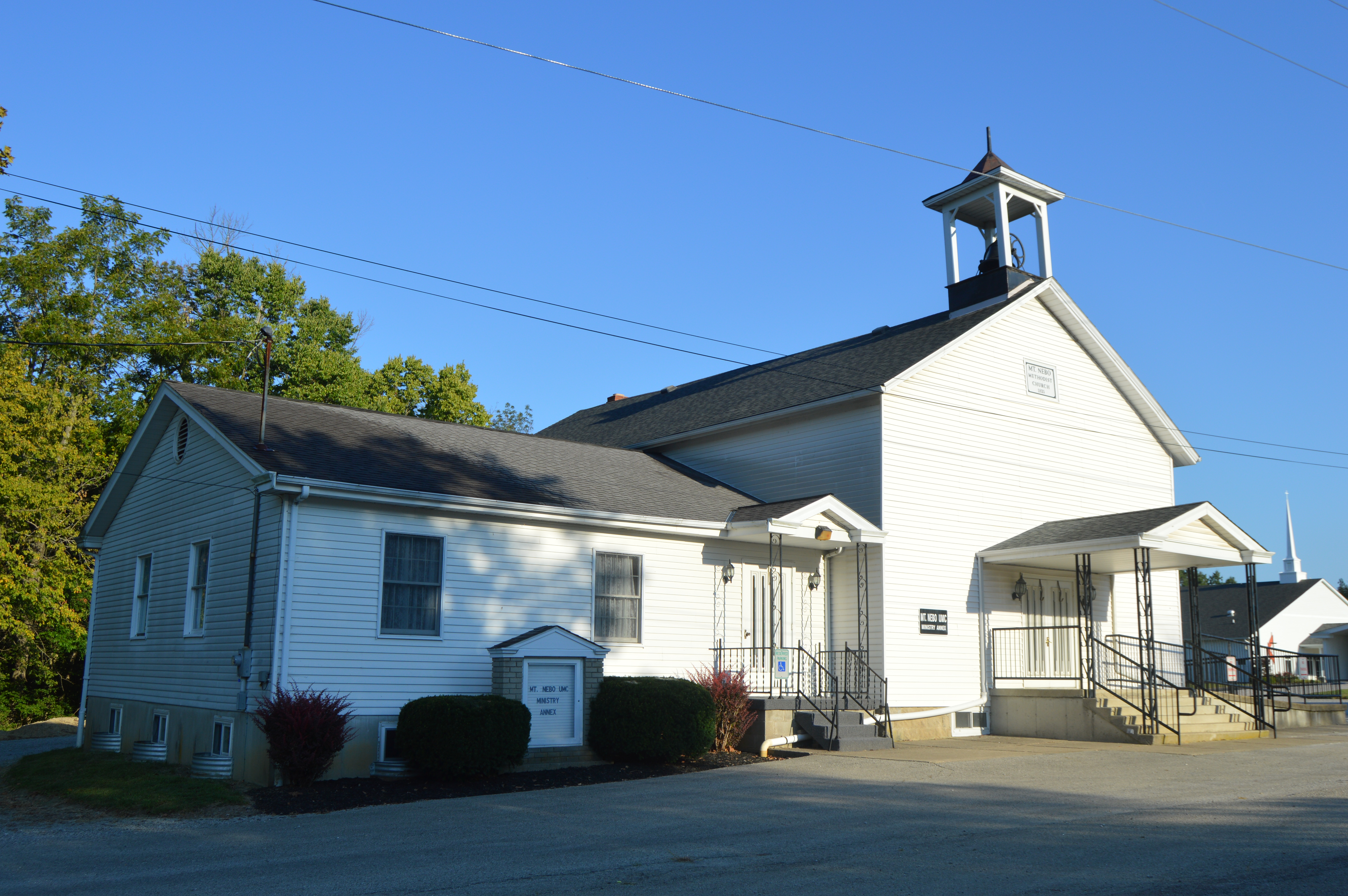
North of Hamersville in Clark Township

Along its way, SR 774 traverses portions of eastern Clermont County and western Brown County. No portion of this highway is included within the National Highway System, a network of routes considered to be most important for the country's economy, mobility and defense.

== History ==
SR 774 was designated in 1938. Originally, the highway ran from its present western terminus at State Route 133 north of Felicity to its junction with SR 125 in Hamersville. One year later, the highway was extended northeasterly to its present eastern terminus at US 68 south of Mount Orab.

== Major intersections ==
County	Location	mi	km	Destinations	Notes
Clermont	Franklin Township	0.00	0.00	SR 133 / CR 56 (Goodwin Schoolhouse Point Isabel Road) – Felicity, Bethel	
Brown	Hamersville	7.22	11.62	SR 125 (Main Street) – Bethel, Georgetown	
Brown	Pike Township	14.93	24.03	US 68 / Oakland Road – Georgetown, Mount Orab	
1.000 mi = 1.609 km; 1.000 km = 0.621 mi
