= Winchester, Adams County, Ohio =

Winchester, Ohio
- Village
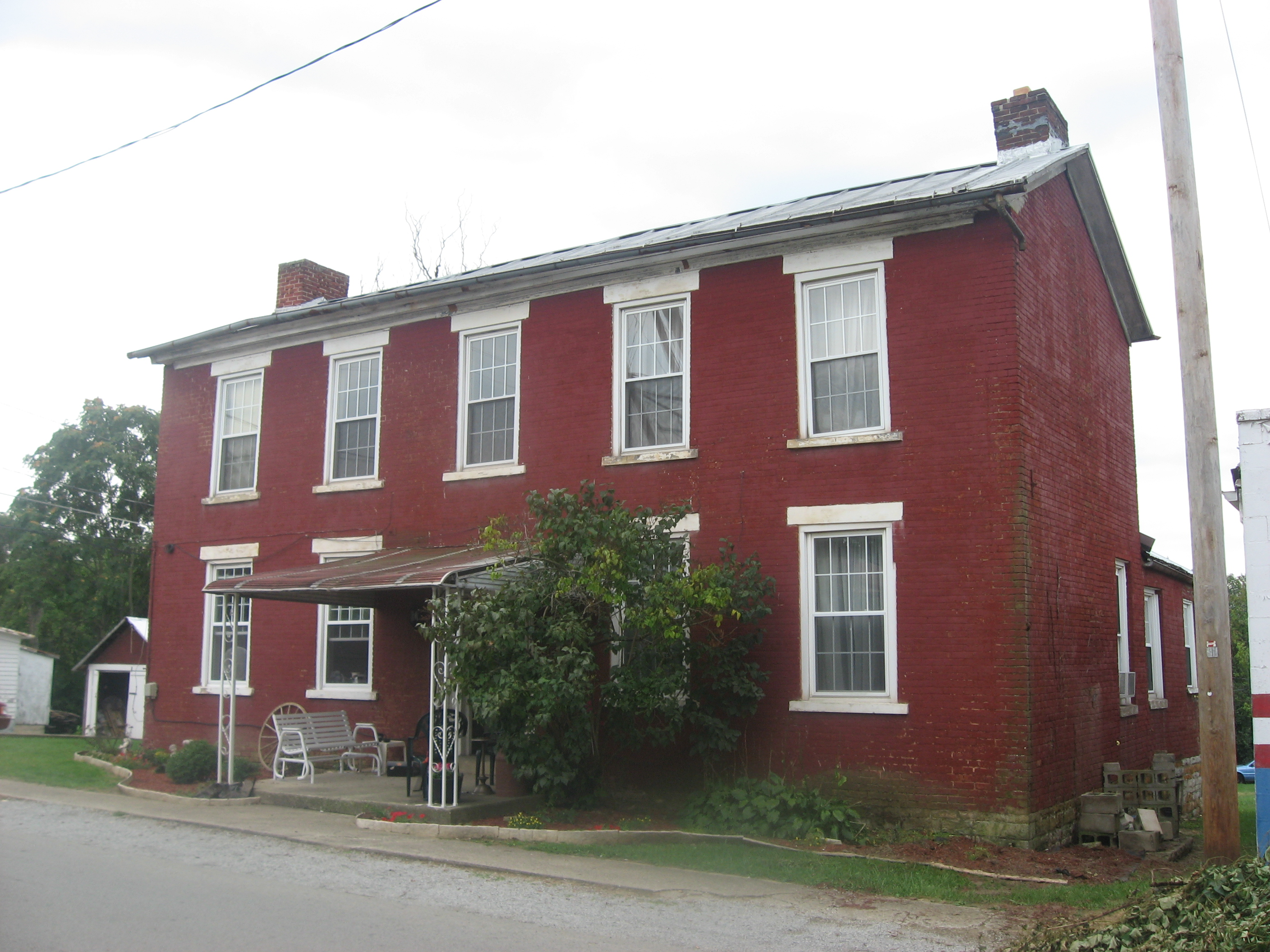
- Dr. A.C. Lewis House, listed on the National Register of Historic Places, located at 103 E. South Street in Winchester

- Location in Adams County and the state of Ohio.
- Coordinates: 38°56′37″N 83°39′14″W
- Country: United States
- State: Ohio
- County: Adams
- Township: Winchester
- Founded: 1815
- Incorporated: 1864

Area
  - Total: 2.63 sq mi (6.82 km^{2})
  - Land: 2.62 sq mi (6.78 km^{2})
  - Water: 0.015 sq mi (0.04 km^{2})
- Elevation: 978 ft (298 m)

Population (2020)
  - Total: 987
  - Estimate (2024): 998
  - Density: 377.3/sq mi (145.67/km^{2})
- Time zone: UTC-5 (Eastern (EST))
  - Summer (DST): UTC-4 (EDT)
- ZIP code: 45697
- Area codes: 937, 326
- FIPS code: 39-85876
- GNIS feature ID: 2399711

Winchester is a village in Winchester Township, Adams County, Ohio, United States. The population was 987 at the 2020 census. The name of the surrounding township is also named Winchester.

State Route 136 passes through Winchester. Winchester is adjacent to Ohio State Route 32, a four lane divided highway known as the Appalachian Highway. The Appalachian Highway links Winchester to Cincinnati.

== History ==
Winchester was laid out in 1815 by Joseph Darlinton. It was named for Darlinton's former hometown of Winchester, Virginia.

There is also an Ohio Historic Site in Winchester, the Dr. A. C. Lewis House. The Dr. A. C. Lewis home was built between 1845 and 1848. Dr. Lewis is considered the first resident physician of Winchester. He was a known abolitionist and used the house as a station on the Underground Railroad.

Winchester was incorporated as a village in 1864.

== Geography ==
According to the United States Census Bureau, the village has a total area of 2.63 square miles (6.81 km^{2}), of which 2.61 square miles (6.76 km^{2}) is land and 0.02 square miles (0.05 km^{2}) is water.

== Demographics ==
Historical population
Census	Pop.	Note	%±
1870	416		—
1880	550		32.2%
1900	796		—
1910	927		16.5%
1920	913		−1.5%
1930	821		−10.1%
1940	798		−2.8%
1950	690		−13.5%
1960	788		14.2%
1970	760		−3.6%
1980	1,080		42.1%
1990	978		−9.4%
2000	1,025		4.8%
2010	1,051		2.5%
2020	987		−6.1%
U.S. Decennial Census

=== 2010 census ===
As of the census of 2010, there were 1,051 people, 420 households, and 273 families living in the village. The population density was 402.7 inhabitants per square mile (155.5/km^{2}). There were 462 housing units at an average density of 177.0 per square mile (68.3/km^{2}). The racial makeup of the village was 98.4% White, 0.2% African American, 0.5% Native American, 0.3% from other races, and 0.7% from two or more races. Hispanic or Latino of any race were 1.0% of the population.

There were 420 households, of which 34.0% had children under the age of 18 living with them, 45.7% were married couples living together, 13.1% had a female householder with no husband present, 6.2% had a male householder with no wife present, and 35.0% were non-families. 31.2% of all households were made up of individuals, and 13.3% had someone living alone who was 65 years of age or older. The average household size was 2.48 and the average family size was 3.05.

The median age in the village was 35.9 years. 27.3% of residents were under the age of 18; 9.3% were between the ages of 18 and 24; 25.9% were from 25 to 44; 22% were from 45 to 64; and 15.6% were 65 years of age or older. The gender makeup of the village was 49.0% male and 51.0% female.

=== 2000 census ===
As of the census of 2000, there were 1,025 people, 410 households, and 280 families living in the village. The population density was 381.8 inhabitants per square mile (147.4/km^{2}). There were 448 housing units at an average density of 166.9 per square mile (64.4/km^{2}). The racial makeup of the village was 99.02% White, 0.20% Native American, 0.39% Asian, and 0.39% from two or more races. Hispanic or Latino of any race were 0.49% of the population.

There were 410 households, out of which 34.9% had children under the age of 18 living with them, 52.4% were married couples living together, 11.0% had a female householder with no husband present, and 31.5% were non-families. 27.6% of all households were made up of individuals, and 13.7% had someone living alone who was 65 years of age or older. The average household size was 2.50 and the average family size was 3.06.

In the village, the population was spread out, with 28.4% under the age of 18, 8.7% from 18 to 24, 28.4% from 25 to 44, 20.3% from 45 to 64, and 14.2% who were 65 years of age or older. The median age was 34 years. For every 100 females, there were 89.1 males. For every 100 females age 18 and over, there were 85.4 males.

The median income for a household in the village was $32,344, and the median income for a family was $36,750. Males had a median income of $33,036 versus $19,028 for females. The per capita income for the village was $16,711. About 9.5% of families and 14.2% of the population were below the poverty line, including 15.2% of those under age 18 and 18.4% of those age 65 or over.

== Notable people ==
- Joseph Edgar Foreman, rapper known by his stage name Afroman

== Gallery ==
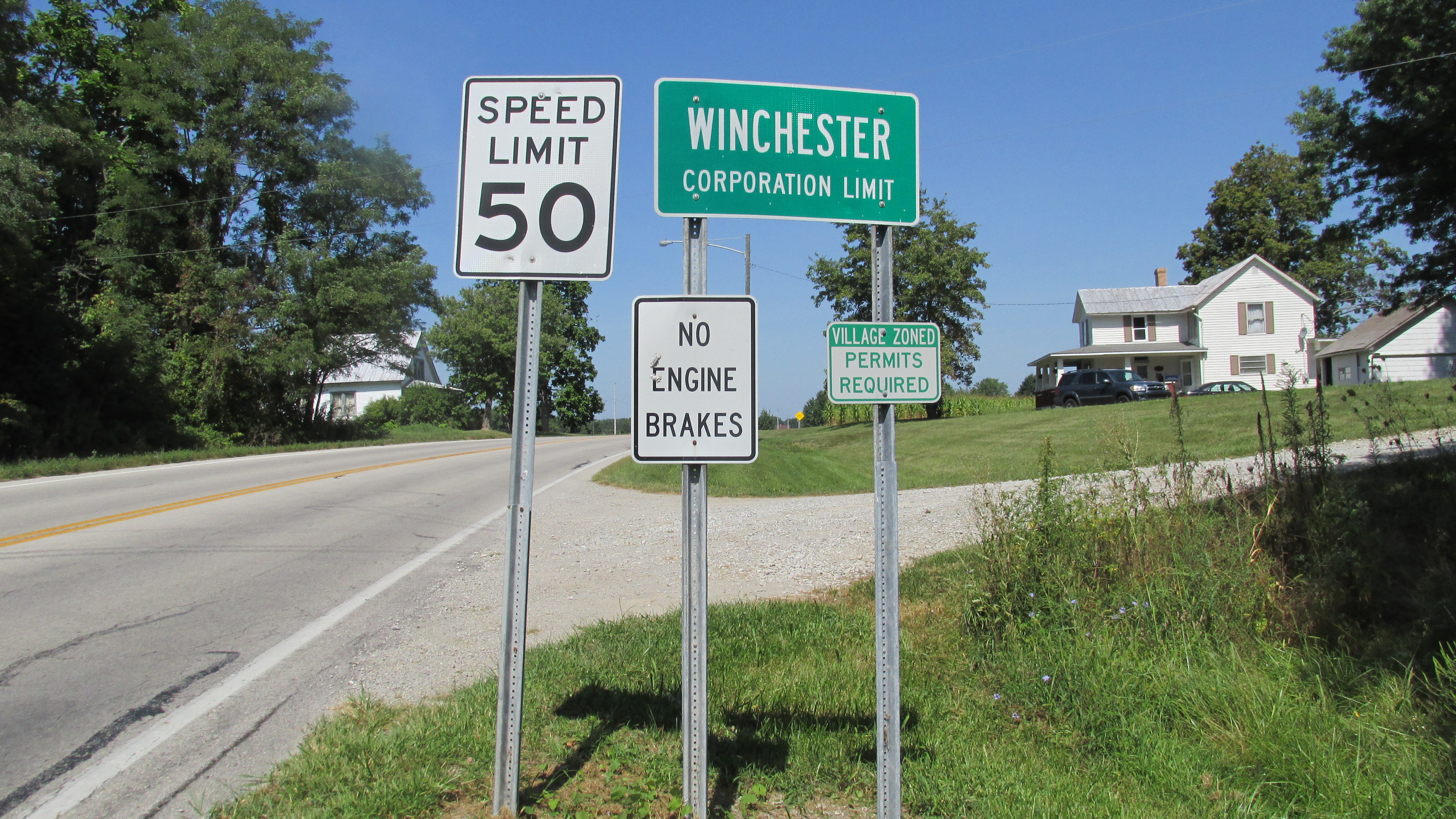
Winchester corporation limit sign

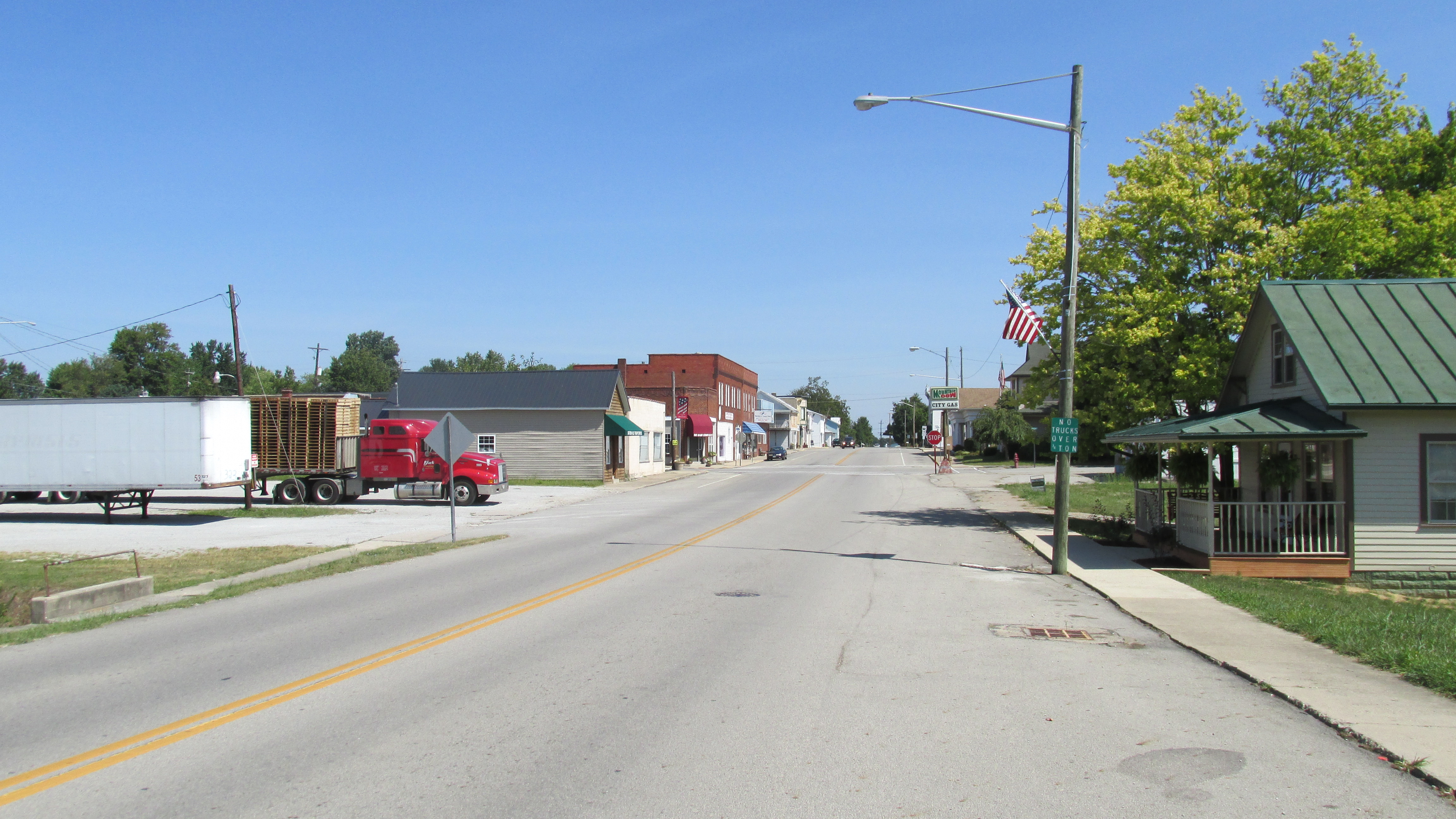
Looking north on Main Street (Ohio Highway 136) in Winchester

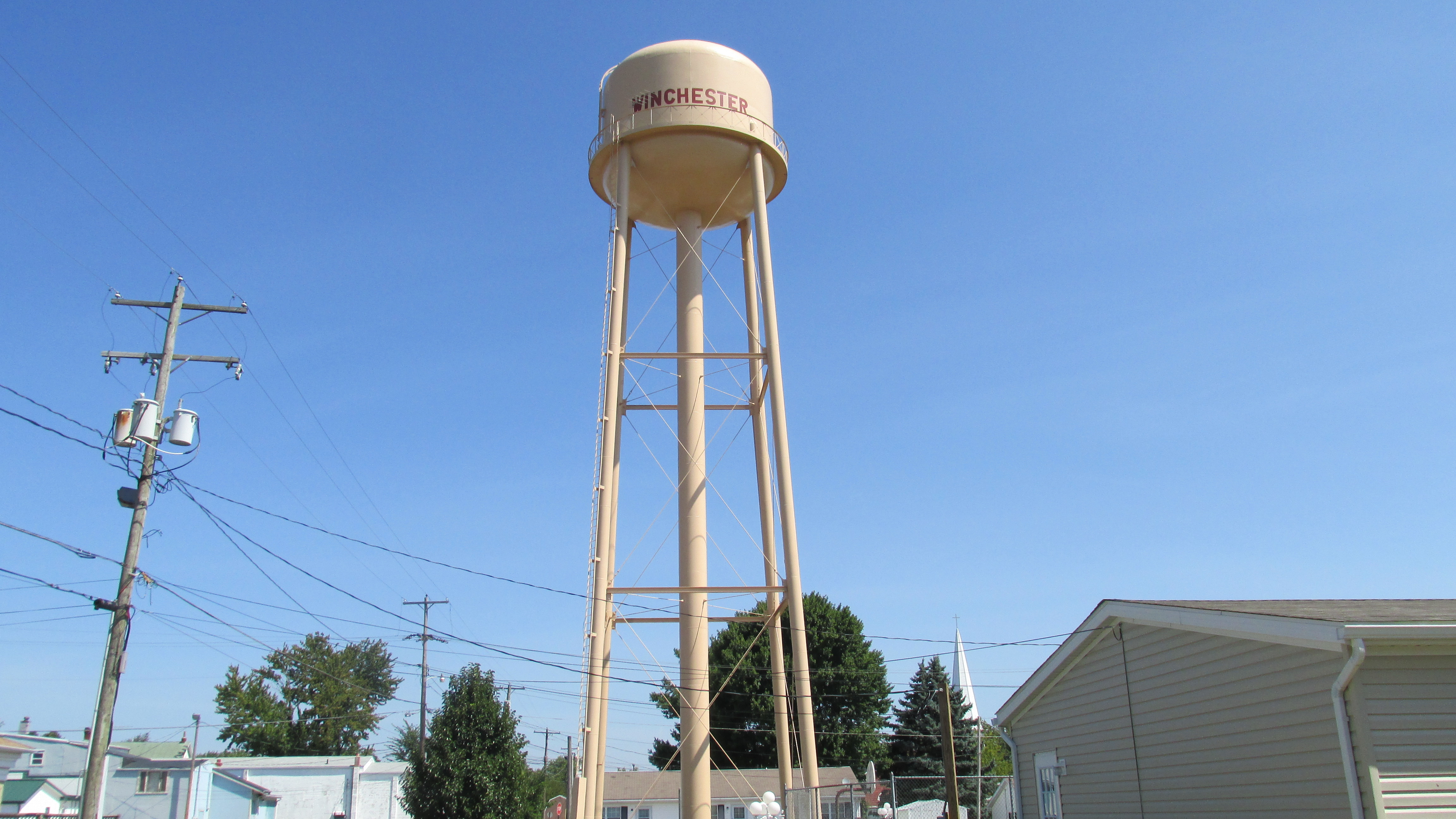
Winchester water tower

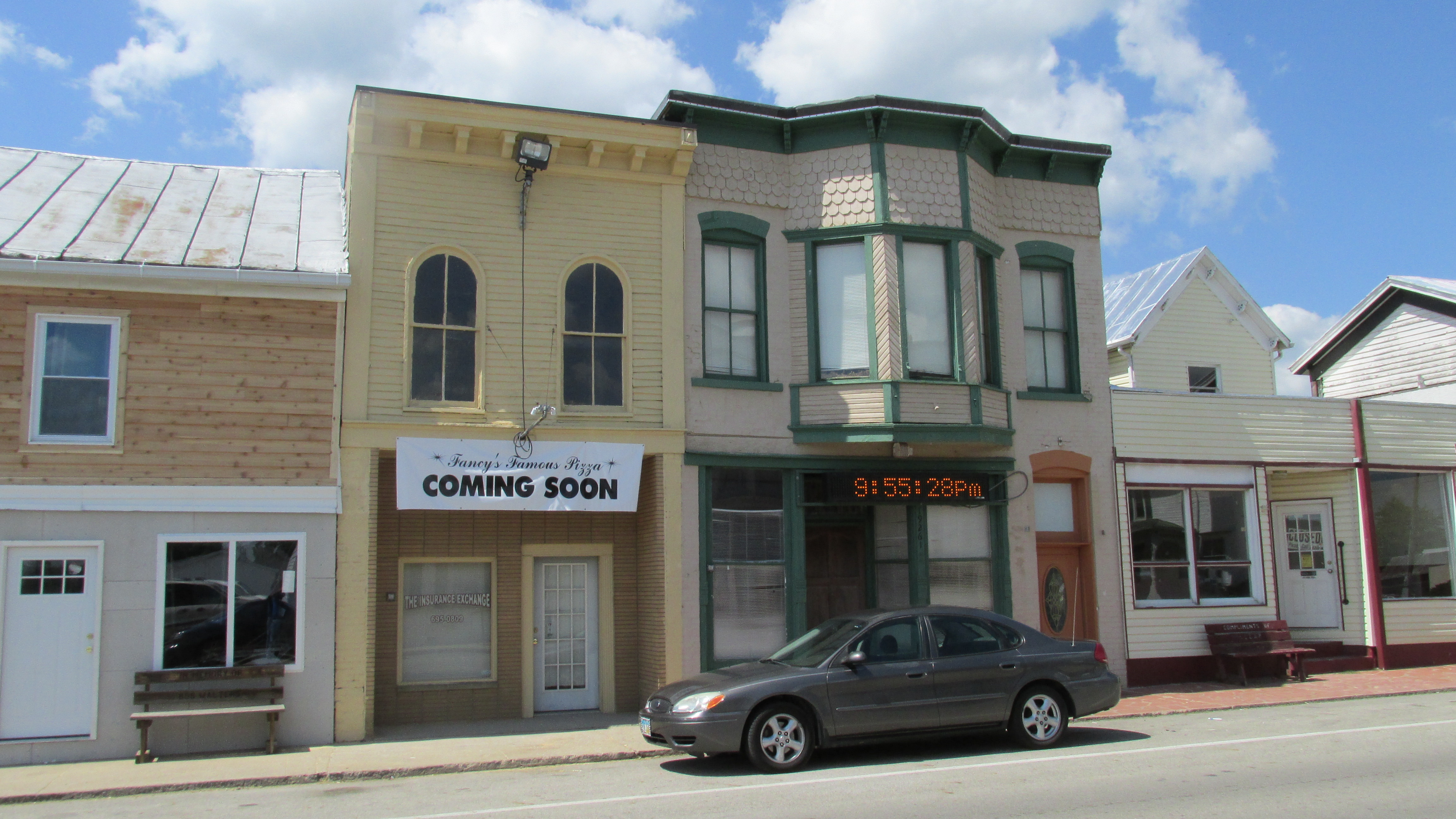
Fancy's Famous Pizza (now "Pop's Pizza")

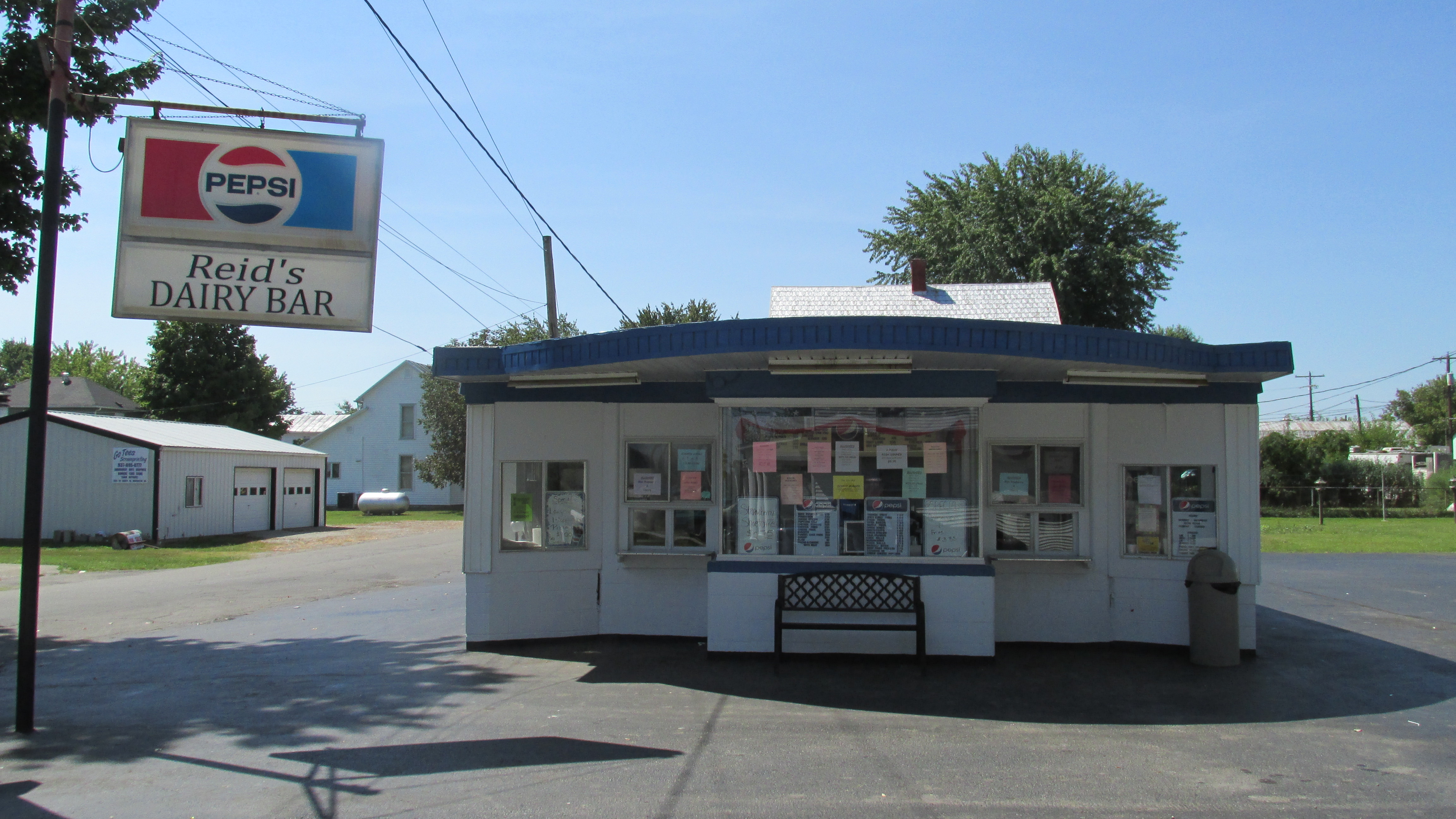
Reid's Dairy Bar (now "Winchester Dairy Bar")

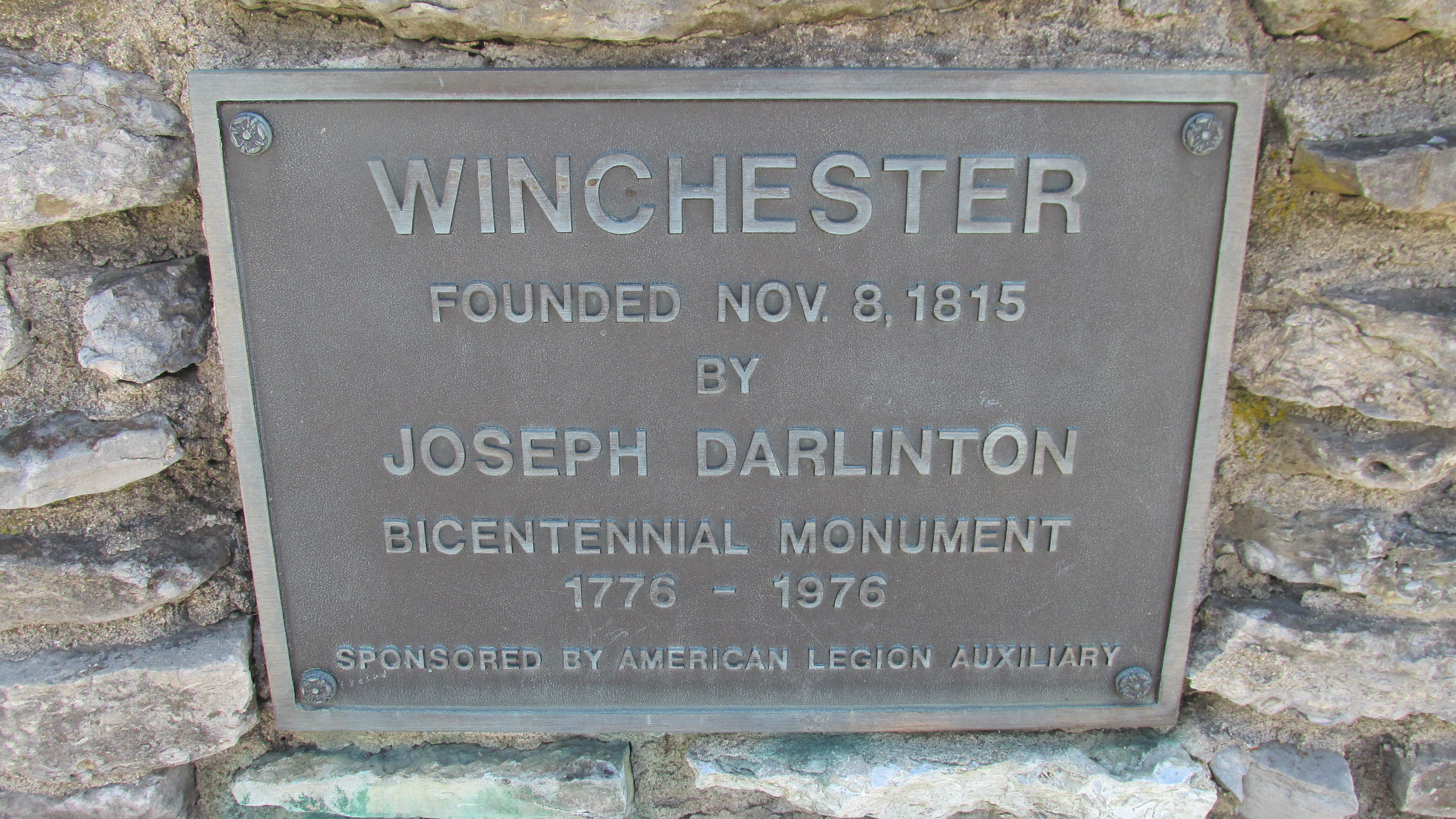
Joseph Darlinton Bicentennial Marker

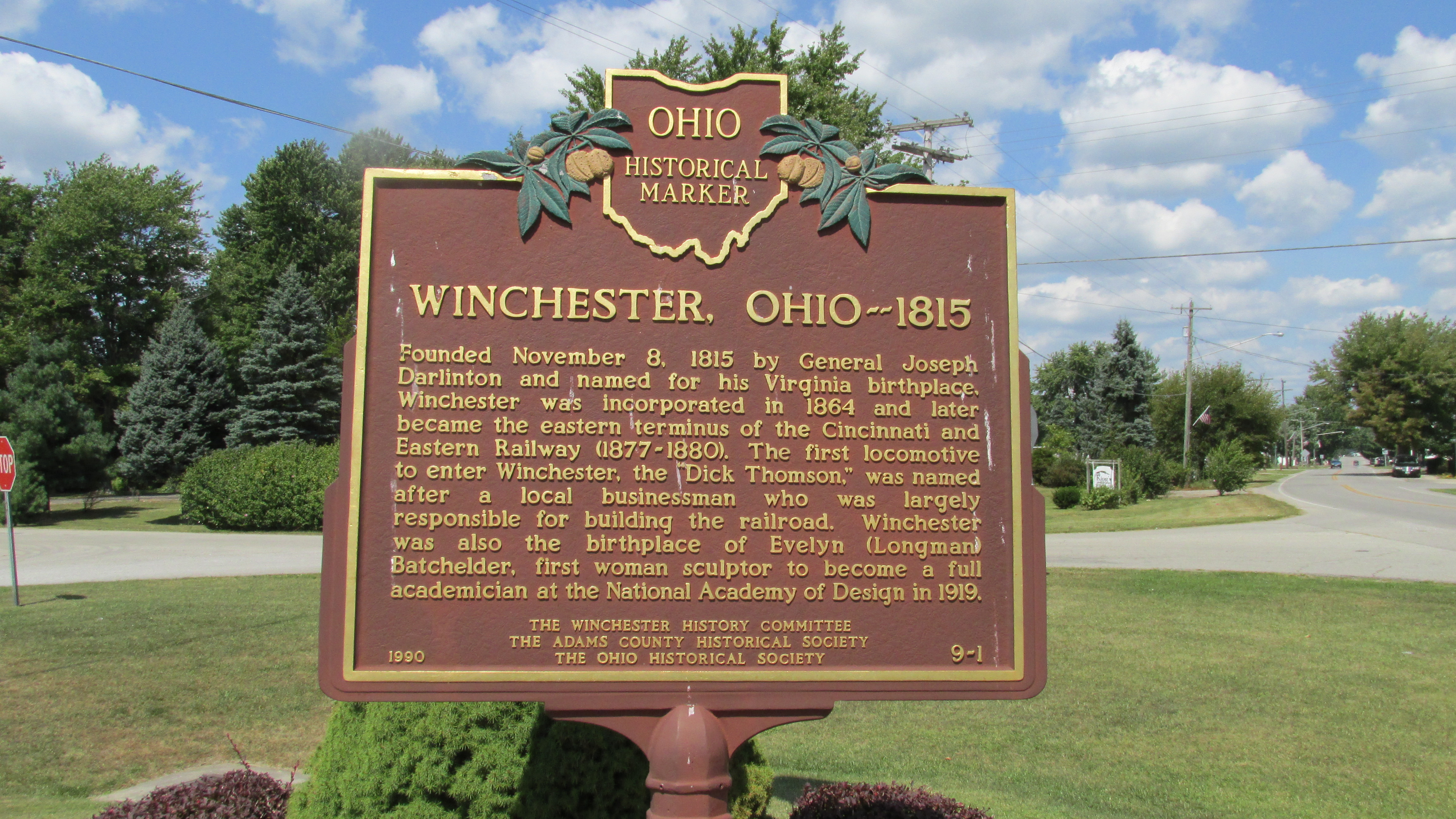
Winchester Ohio Historical Marker

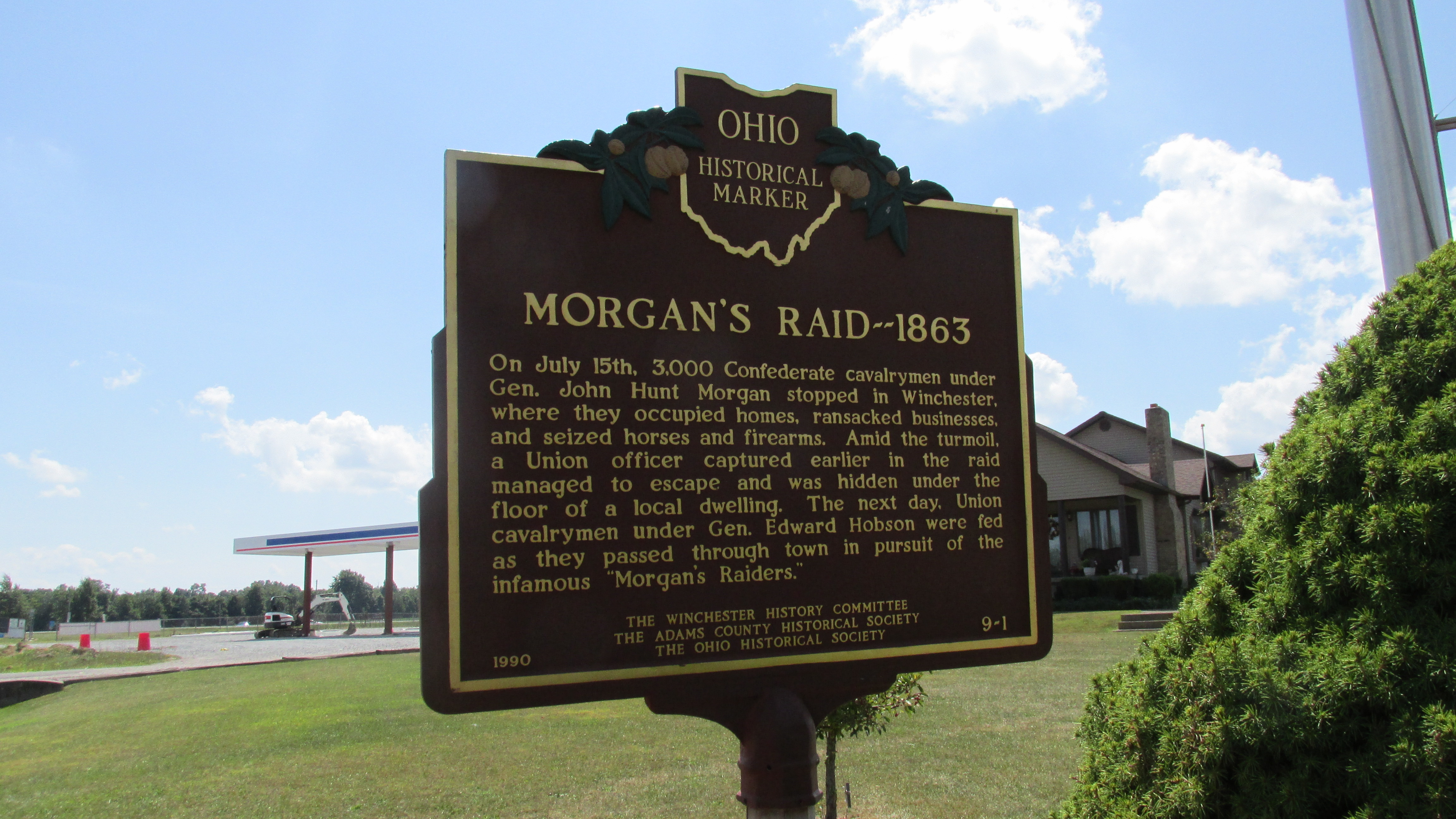
Morgan's Raid 1863 (reverse side)

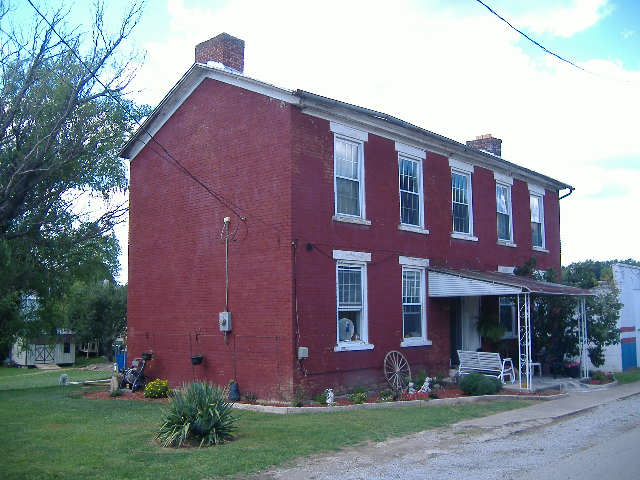
Dr. A. C. Lewis House
