= Jackson Township, Brown County, Ohio =

Township in Ohio, US

- Township
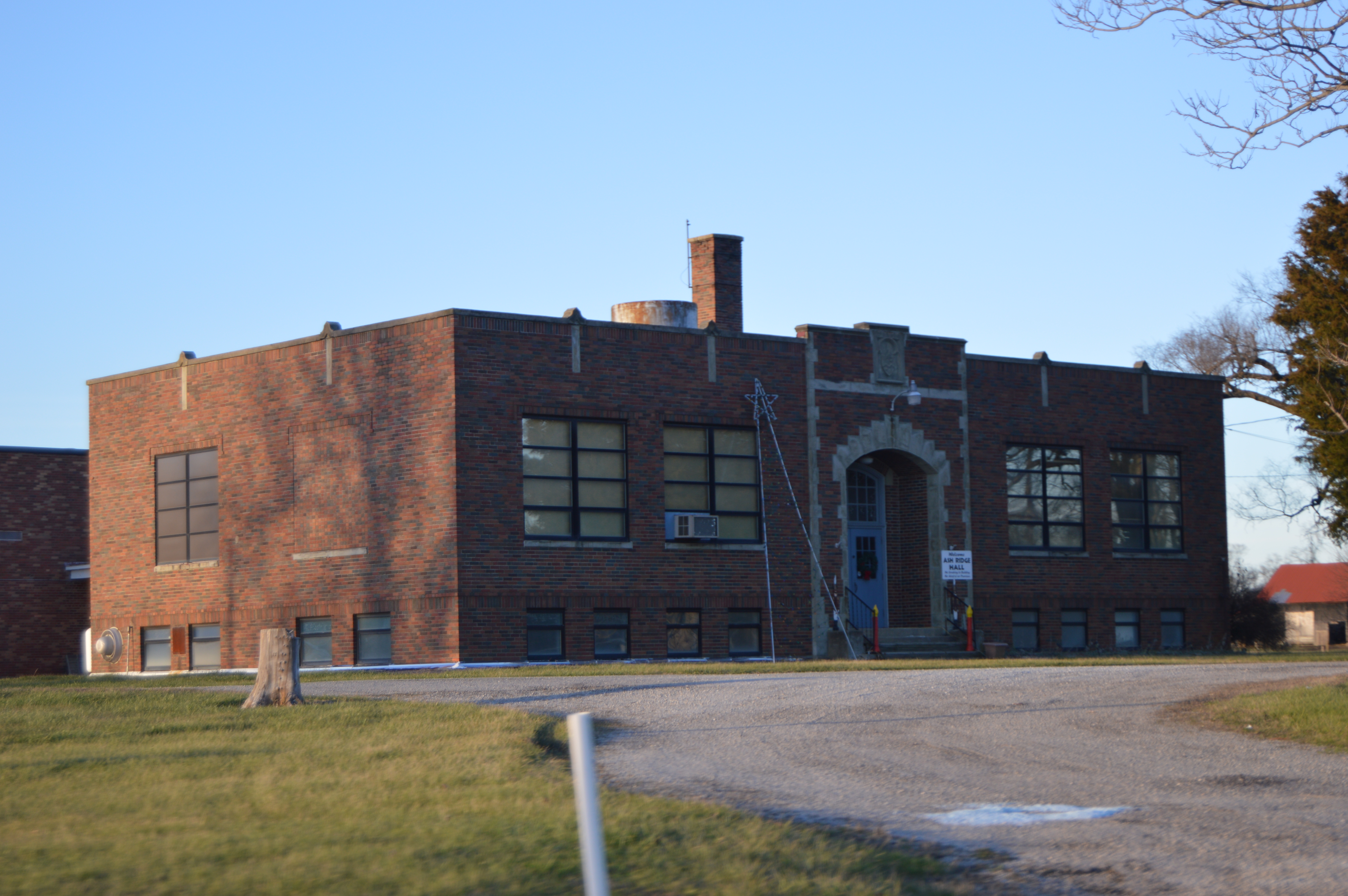
- Community center on U.S. Route 62 at Ash Ridge

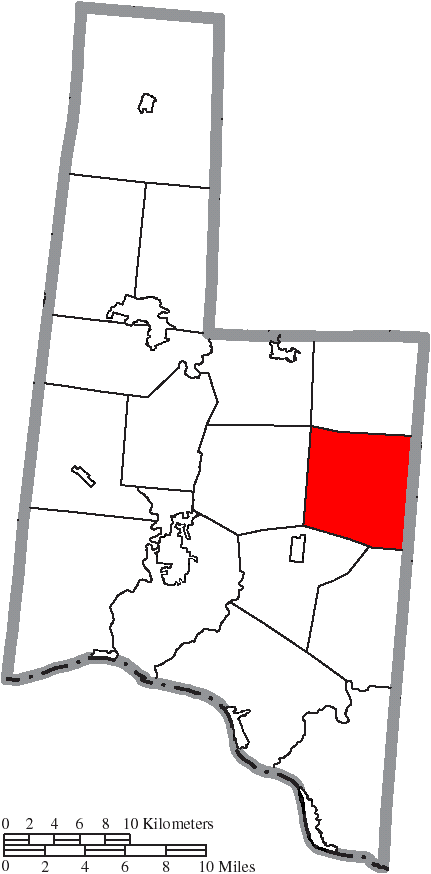
- Location of Jackson Township in Brown County
- Coordinates: 38°55′18″N 83°45′24″W
- Country: United States
- State: Ohio
- County: Brown

Area
  - Total: 28.3 sq mi (73.4 km^{2})
  - Land: 28.2 sq mi (73.0 km^{2})
  - Water: 0.15 sq mi (0.4 km^{2})
- Elevation: 997 ft (304 m)

Population (2020)
  - Total: 1,738
  - Density: 61.7/sq mi (23.8/km^{2})
- Time zone: UTC-5 (Eastern (EST))
  - Summer (DST): UTC-4 (EDT)
- FIPS code: 39-37688
- GNIS feature ID: 1085798

Jackson Township is one of the sixteen townships of Brown County, Ohio, United States. The 2020 census found 1,738 people in the township.

== Geography ==
Located in the eastern part of the county, it borders the following townships:

- Eagle Township - north
- Winchester Township, Adams County - northeast
- Wayne Township, Adams County - southeast
- Byrd Township - south
- Jefferson Township - southwest
- Franklin Township - west
- Washington Township - northwest corner

No municipalities are located in Jackson Township.

== Name and history ==
It is one of thirty-seven Jackson Townships statewide.

Jackson Township was established in 1823.

== Government ==
The township is governed by a three-member board of trustees, who are elected in November of odd-numbered years to a four-year term beginning on the following January 1. Two are elected in the year after the presidential election and one is elected in the year before it. There is also an elected township fiscal officer, who serves a four-year term beginning on April 1 of the year after the election, which is held in November of the year before the presidential election. Vacancies in the fiscal officership or on the board of trustees are filled by the remaining trustees.
