= Lewis Township, Brown County, Ohio =

Township in Ohio, US

- Township
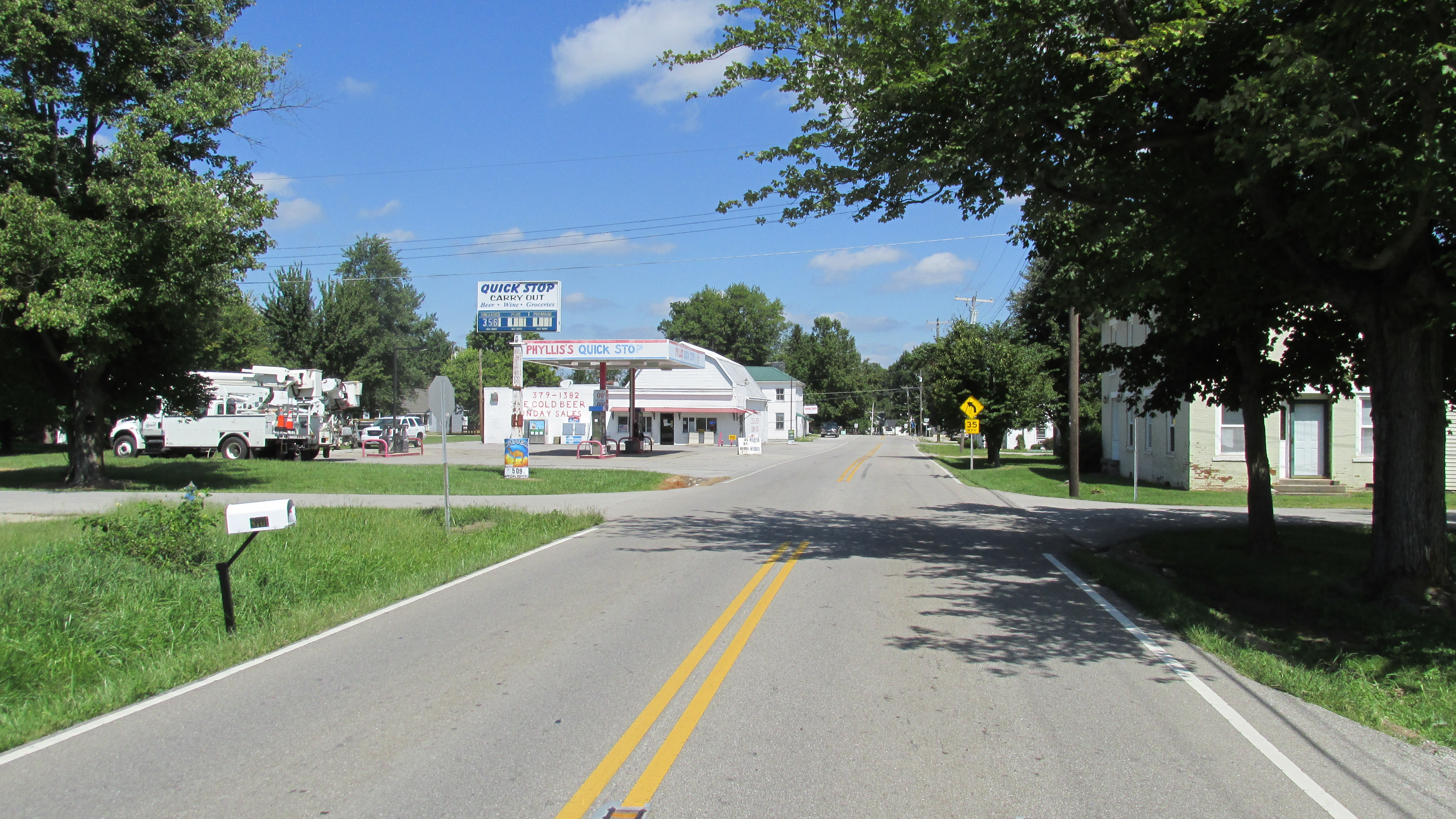
- State Route 505 in Feesburg

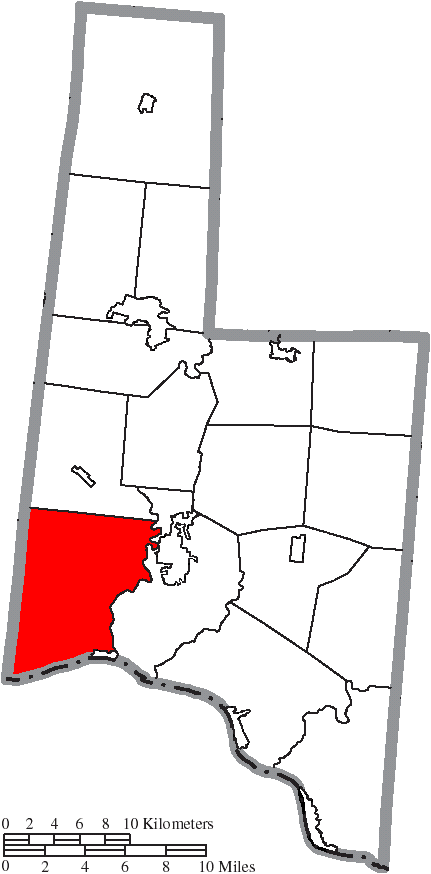
- Location of Lewis Township in Brown County
- Coordinates: 38°49′55″N 83°59′29″W
- Country: United States
- State: Ohio
- County: Brown

Area
  - Total: 43.2 sq mi (111.9 km^{2})
  - Land: 42.6 sq mi (110.3 km^{2})
  - Water: 0.62 sq mi (1.6 km^{2})
- Elevation: 860 ft (262 m)

Population (2020)
  - Total: 2,393
  - Density: 56.19/sq mi (21.70/km^{2})
- Time zone: UTC-5 (Eastern (EST))
  - Summer (DST): UTC-4 (EDT)
- FIPS code: 39-42910
- GNIS feature ID: 1085800

Lewis Township is one of the sixteen townships of Brown County, Ohio, United States. The 2020 census found 2,393 people in the township.

== Geography ==
Located in the southwestern corner of the county along the Ohio River, it borders the following townships:

- Clark Township - north
- Pleasant Township - east
- Franklin Township, Clermont County - west
- Tate Township, Clermont County - northwest

Bracken County, Kentucky lies across the Ohio River to the south.

The village of Higginsport is located in southeastern Lewis Township, along the Ohio River, and the unincorporated community of Feesburg lies in the township's north.

== Name and history ==
It is the only Lewis Township statewide.

Lewis Township was organized in 1807. Lewis is probably the name of a pioneer settler.

== Government ==
The township is governed by a three-member board of trustees, who are elected in November of odd-numbered years to a four-year term beginning on the following January 1. Two are elected in the year after the presidential election and one is elected in the year before it. There is also an elected township fiscal officer, who serves a four-year term beginning on April 1 of the year after the election, which is held in November of the year before the presidential election. Vacancies in the fiscal officership or on the board of trustees are filled by the remaining trustees.
