= Franklin Township, Brown County, Ohio =

Township in Ohio, US

- Township
- Dam at Lake Waynoka

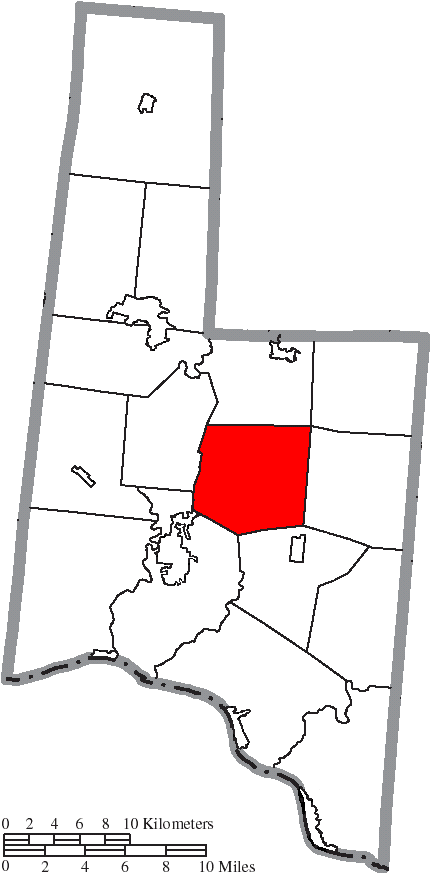
- Location of Franklin Township in Brown County
- Coordinates: 38°55′31″N 83°48′42″W
- Country: United States
- State: Ohio
- County: Brown

Area
  - Total: 27.3 sq mi (70.6 km^{2})
  - Land: 26.9 sq mi (69.6 km^{2})
  - Water: 0.39 sq mi (1.0 km^{2})
- Elevation: 978 ft (298 m)

Population (2020)
  - Total: 1,666
  - Density: 62.0/sq mi (23.9/km^{2})
- Time zone: UTC-5 (Eastern (EST))
  - Summer (DST): UTC-4 (EDT)
- FIPS code: 39-28210
- GNIS feature ID: 1085795

Franklin Township is one of the sixteen townships of Brown County, Ohio, United States. The 2020 census found 1,666 people in the township.

== Geography ==
Located in the center of the county, it borders the following townships:

- Washington Township - north
- Eagle Township - northeast corner
- Jackson Township - east
- Jefferson Township - southeast
- Pleasant Township - southwest
- Scott Township - northwest

No municipalities are located in Franklin Township.

== Name and history ==
It is one of twenty-one Franklin Townships statewide.

Franklin Township was established in 1822.

== Government ==
The township is governed by a three-member board of trustees, who are elected in November of odd-numbered years to a four-year term beginning on the following January 1. Two are elected in the year after the presidential election and one is elected in the year before it. There is also an elected township fiscal officer, who serves a four-year term beginning on April 1 of the year after the election, which is held in November of the year before the presidential election. Vacancies in the fiscal officership or on the board of trustees are filled by the remaining trustees.
