= Eagle Township, Brown County, Ohio =

Township in Ohio, US

- Township
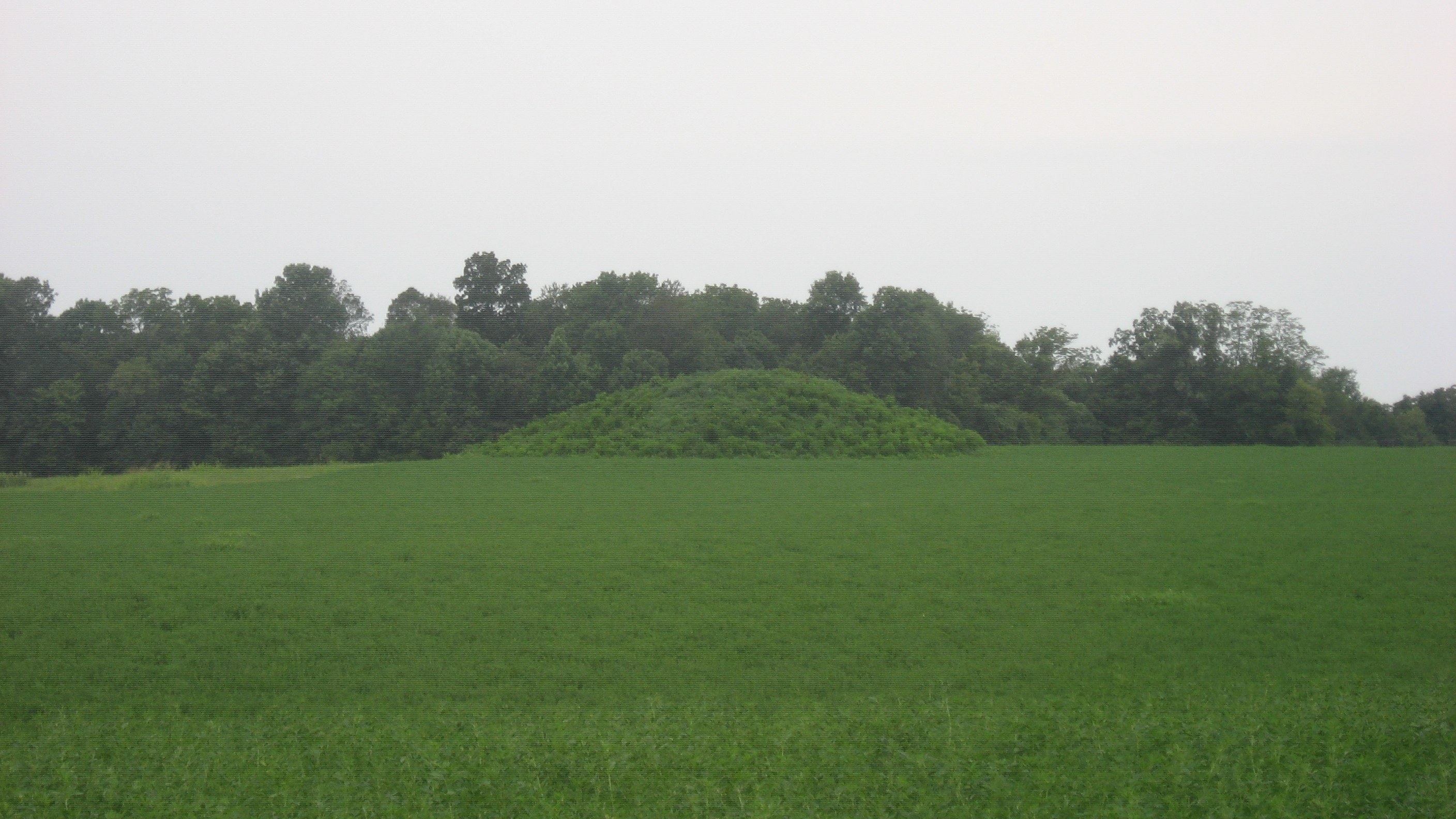
- Eagle Township Works I Mound

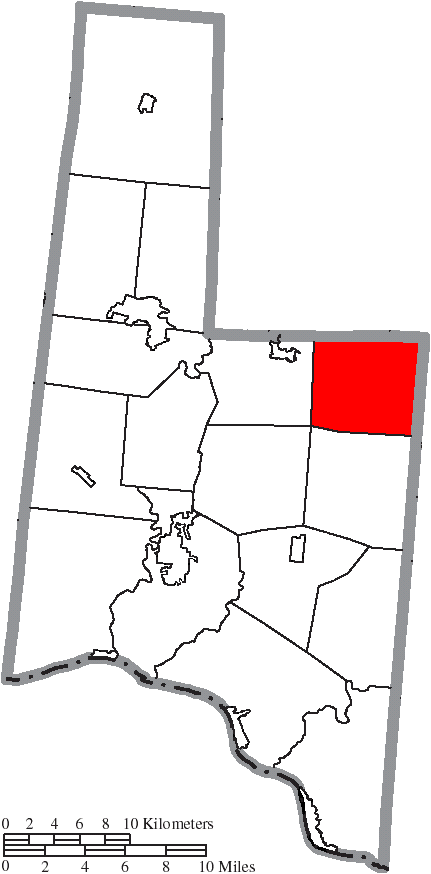
- Location of Eagle Township in Brown County
- Coordinates: 38°58′45″N 83°43′36″W
- Country: United States
- State: Ohio
- County: Brown

Area
  - Total: 25.6 sq mi (66.2 km^{2})
  - Land: 25.6 sq mi (66.2 km^{2})
  - Water: 0 sq mi (0.0 km^{2})
- Elevation: 991 ft (302 m)

Population (2020)
  - Total: 1,293
  - Density: 50.6/sq mi (19.5/km^{2})
- Time zone: UTC-5 (Eastern (EST))
  - Summer (DST): UTC-4 (EDT)
- FIPS code: 39-23072
- GNIS feature ID: 1085794

Eagle Township is one of the sixteen townships of Brown County, Ohio, United States. The 2020 census found 1,293 people in the township.

== Geography ==
Located in the northeastern corner of the county, it borders the following townships:

- Concord Township, Highland County - northeast
- Winchester Township, Adams County - east
- Jackson Township - south
- Franklin Township - southwest corner
- Washington Township - west
- Whiteoak Township, Highland County - northwest

No municipalities are located in Eagle Township.

== Name and history ==
Statewide, other Eagle Townships are located in Hancock and Vinton counties.

Eagle Township was established in 1817.

== Government ==
The township is governed by a three-member board of trustees, who are elected in November of odd-numbered years to a four-year term beginning on the following January 1. Two are elected in the year after the presidential election and one is elected in the year before it. There is also an elected township fiscal officer, who serves a four-year term beginning on April 1 of the year after the election, which is held in November of the year before the presidential election. Vacancies in the fiscal officership or on the board of trustees are filled by the remaining trustees.
