= Jefferson Township, Brown County, Ohio =

Township in Ohio, US

- Township
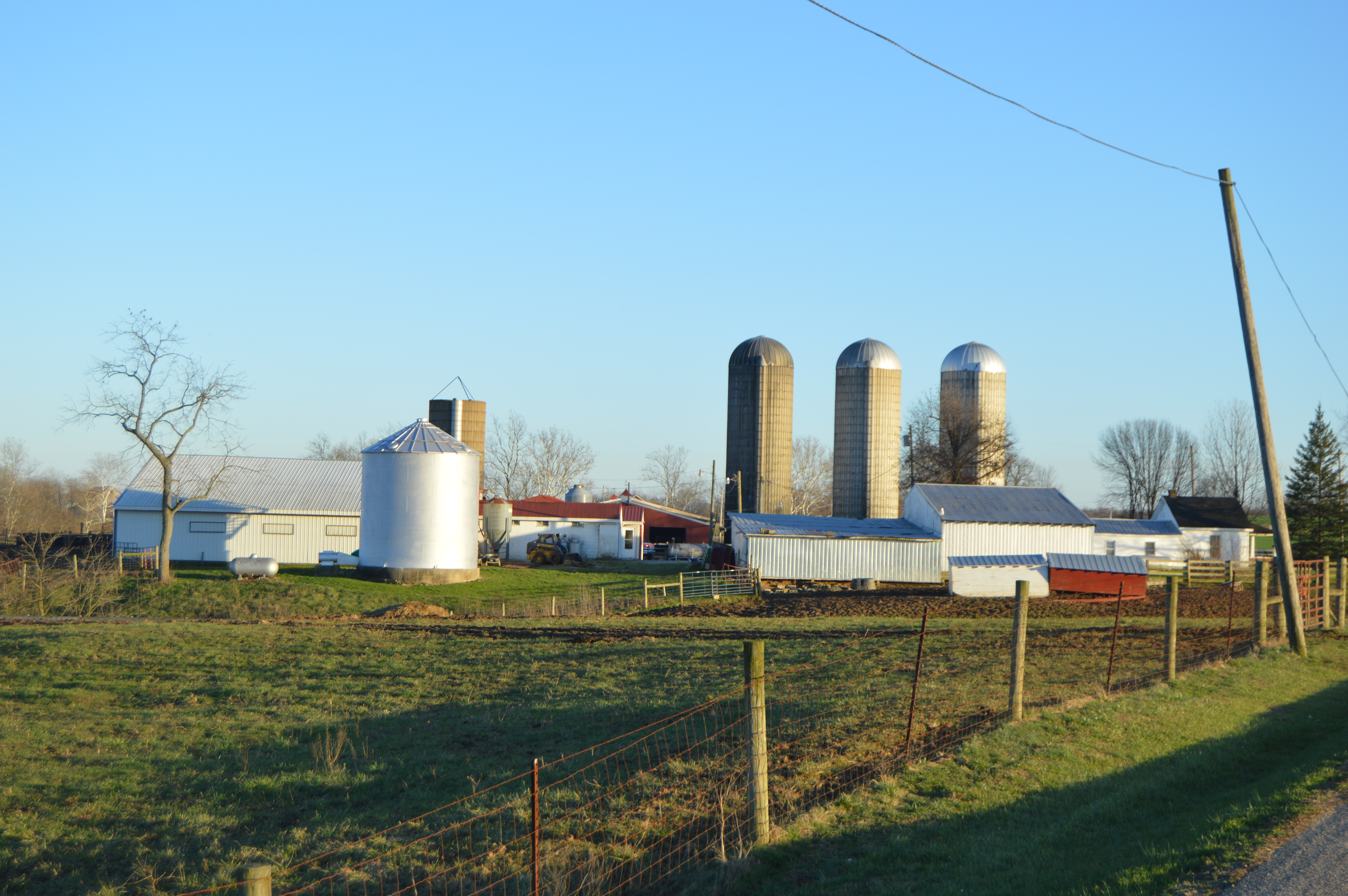
- Farmstead southeast of Russellville

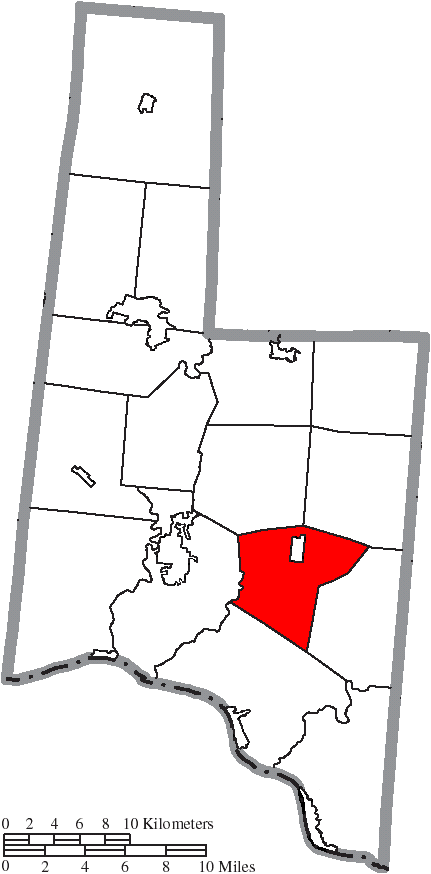
- Location of Jefferson Township in Brown County
- Coordinates: 38°51′21″N 83°47′28″W
- Country: United States
- State: Ohio
- County: Brown

Area
  - Total: 23.47 sq mi (60.78 km^{2})
  - Land: 23.45 sq mi (60.74 km^{2})
  - Water: 0.012 sq mi (0.03 km^{2})
- Elevation: 925 ft (282 m)

Population (2020)
  - Total: 1,407
  - Density: 60.00/sq mi (23.16/km^{2})
- Time zone: UTC-5 (Eastern (EST))
  - Summer (DST): UTC-4 (EDT)
- FIPS code: 39-38528
- GNIS feature ID: 1085799

Jefferson Township is one of the sixteen townships of Brown County, Ohio, United States. The 2020 census found 1,407 people in the township.

== Geography ==
Located in the eastern part of the county, it borders the following townships:

- Jackson Township - northeast
- Byrd Township - southeast
- Union Township - south
- Pleasant Township - west
- Franklin Township - northwest

The village of Russellville is located in northern Jefferson Township.

== Name and history ==
It is one of twenty-four Jefferson Townships statewide.

Jefferson Township was established in 1853 from land given by Byrd Township.

== Government ==
The township is governed by a three-member board of trustees, who are elected in November of odd-numbered years to a four-year term beginning on the following January 1. Two are elected in the year after the presidential election and one is elected in the year before it. There is also an elected township fiscal officer, who serves a four-year term beginning on April 1 of the year after the election, which is held in November of the year before the presidential election. Vacancies in the fiscal officership or on the board of trustees are filled by the remaining trustees.
