= Albert Nelson Marquis =

American publisher (1855–1943)

Albert Nelson Marquis (January 10, 1855 – December 21, 1943) was a Chicago publisher best known for creating the Who's Who book series, starting with Who's Who in America, which was first published in 1899. The Albert Nelson Marquis Lifetime Achievement Award is also named after him.

Marquis was born in Decatur, Ohio, and raised by his maternal grandparents in nearby Hamersville. At age 21 he founded the A.N. Marquis & Company in Cincinnati, and moved to Chicago in 1884. His early publications were generally guide books, directories, and maps. He was the full owner of Who's Who until 1926, and remained as editor in chief of the publication until 1940. Marquis also published specialized versions Who's Who, including occupation-specific and location-specific editions.

Marquis died of heart trouble at his home in Evanston, Illinois, on December 21, 1943.
