= Clark Township, Brown County, Ohio =

Township in Ohio, US

- Township
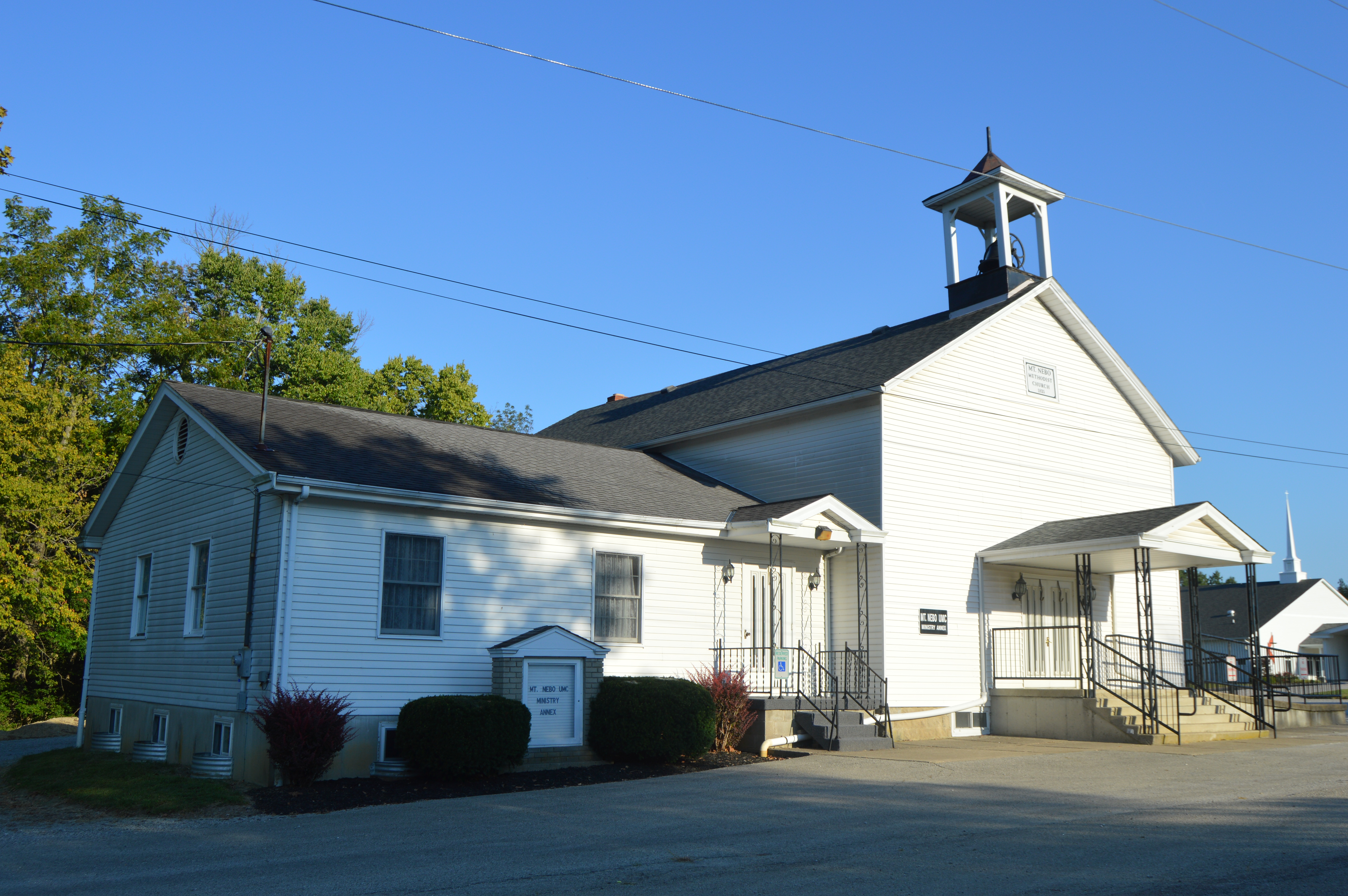
- Mount Nebo United Methodist Church, State Route 774

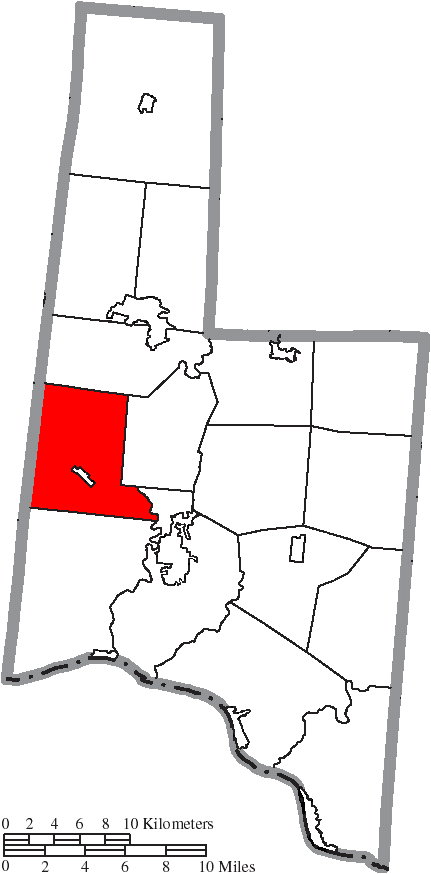
- Location of Clark Township in Brown County
- Coordinates: 38°55′27″N 83°59′26″W
- Country: United States
- State: Ohio
- County: Brown

Area
  - Total: 29.64 sq mi (76.77 km^{2})
  - Land: 29.63 sq mi (76.75 km^{2})
  - Water: 0.0077 sq mi (0.02 km^{2})
- Elevation: 968 ft (295 m)

Population (2020)
  - Total: 2,952
  - Density: 99.62/sq mi (38.46/km^{2})
- Time zone: UTC-5 (Eastern (EST))
  - Summer (DST): UTC-4 (EDT)
- FIPS code: 39-15224
- GNIS feature ID: 1085793

Clark Township is one of the sixteen townships of Brown County, Ohio, United States. The 2020 census found 2,952 people in the township.

== Geography ==
Located in the western part of the county, it borders the following townships:

- Pike Township - north
- Scott Township - east
- Pleasant Township - southeast
- Lewis Township - south
- Tate Township, Clermont County - west
- Williamsburg Township, Clermont County - northwest corner

The village of Hamersville is located in central Clark Township.

== Name and history ==
Clark Township was established in 1808. Statewide, other Clark Townships are located in Clinton, Coshocton, and Holmes counties.

== Government ==
The township is governed by a three-member board of trustees, who are elected in November of odd-numbered years to a four-year term beginning on the following January 1. Two are elected in the year after the presidential election and one is elected in the year before it. There is also an elected township fiscal officer, who serves a four-year term beginning on April 1 of the year after the election, which is held in November of the year before the presidential election. Vacancies in the fiscal officership or on the board of trustees are filled by the remaining trustees.
