= Whiteoak Township, Highland County, Ohio =

Township in Ohio, US

- Township
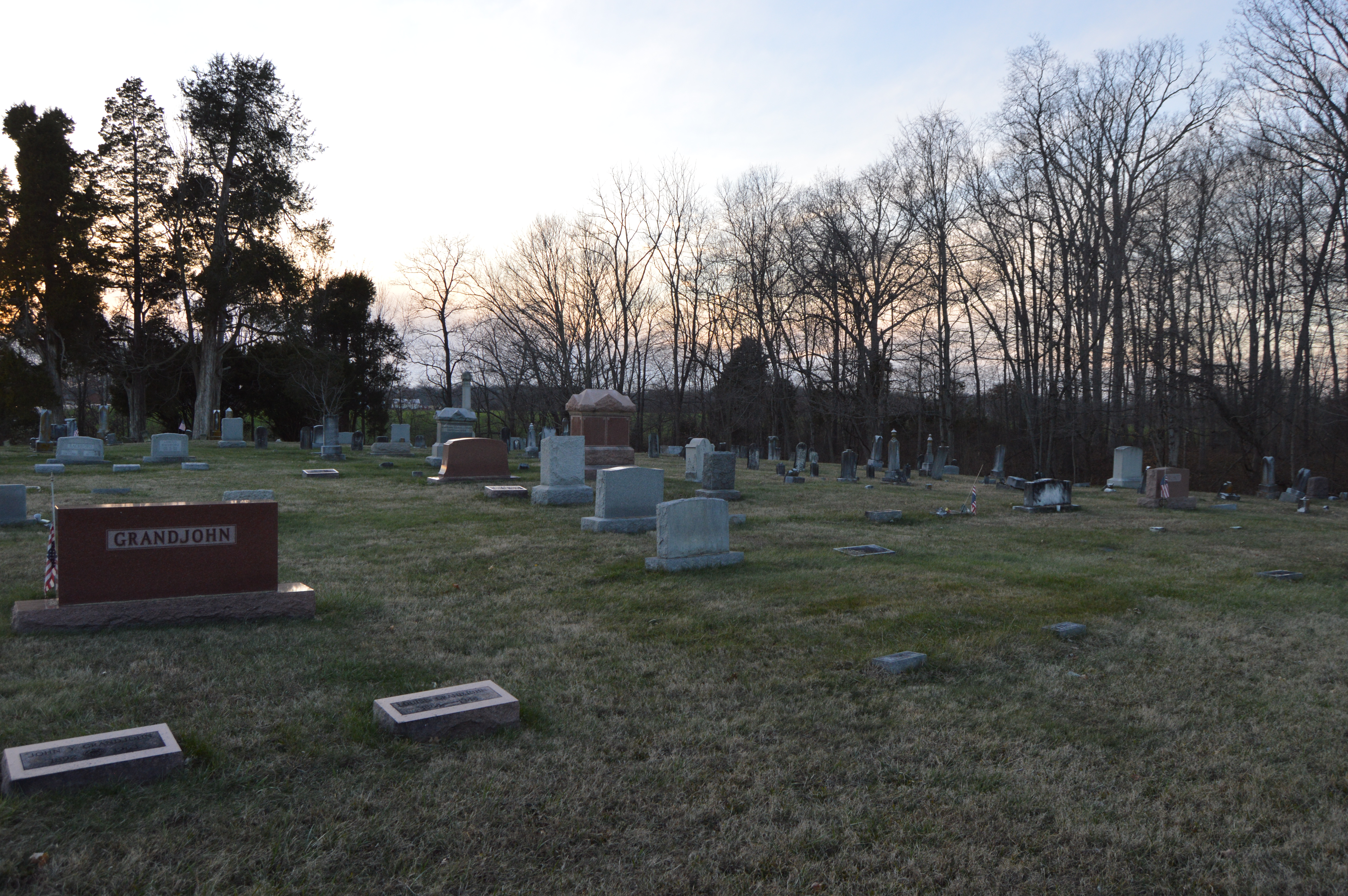
- The Ebenezer Cemetery, southwest of Mowrystown

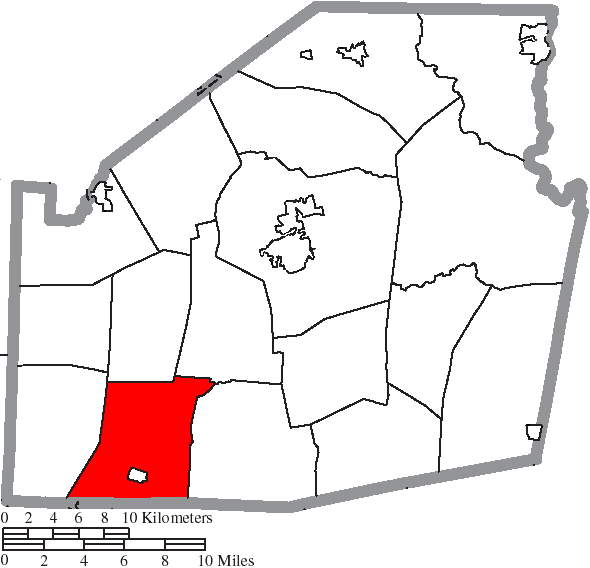
- Location of Whiteoak Township in Highland County
- Coordinates: 39°2′33″N 83°45′8″W
- Country: United States
- State: Ohio
- County: Highland

Area
  - Total: 30.30 sq mi (78.48 km^{2})
  - Land: 30.29 sq mi (78.46 km^{2})
  - Water: 0.0077 sq mi (0.02 km^{2})
- Elevation: 958 ft (292 m)

Population (2020)
  - Total: 1,305
  - Density: 43.08/sq mi (16.63/km^{2})
- Time zone: UTC-5 (Eastern (EST))
  - Summer (DST): UTC-4 (EDT)
- FIPS code: 39-84826
- GNIS feature ID: 1086315

Whiteoak Township is one of the seventeen townships of Highland County, Ohio, United States. As of the 2020 census the population was 1,305.

== Geography ==
Located in the southwestern part of the county, it borders the following townships:

- Hamer Township - north
- New Market Township - northeast
- Concord Township - east
- Eagle Township, Brown County - southeast
- Washington Township, Brown County - southwest
- Clay Township - west

The village of Mowrystown is located in southern Whiteoak Township.

== Name and history ==
It is the only Whiteoak Township statewide.

== Government ==
The township is governed by a three-member board of trustees, who are elected in November of odd-numbered years to a four-year term beginning on the following January 1. Two are elected in the year after the presidential election and one is elected in the year before it. There is also an elected township fiscal officer, who serves a four-year term beginning on April 1 of the year after the election, which is held in November of the year before the presidential election. Vacancies in the fiscal officership or on the board of trustees are filled by the remaining trustees.
