= Washington Township, Brown County, Ohio =

Township in Ohio, US

- Township
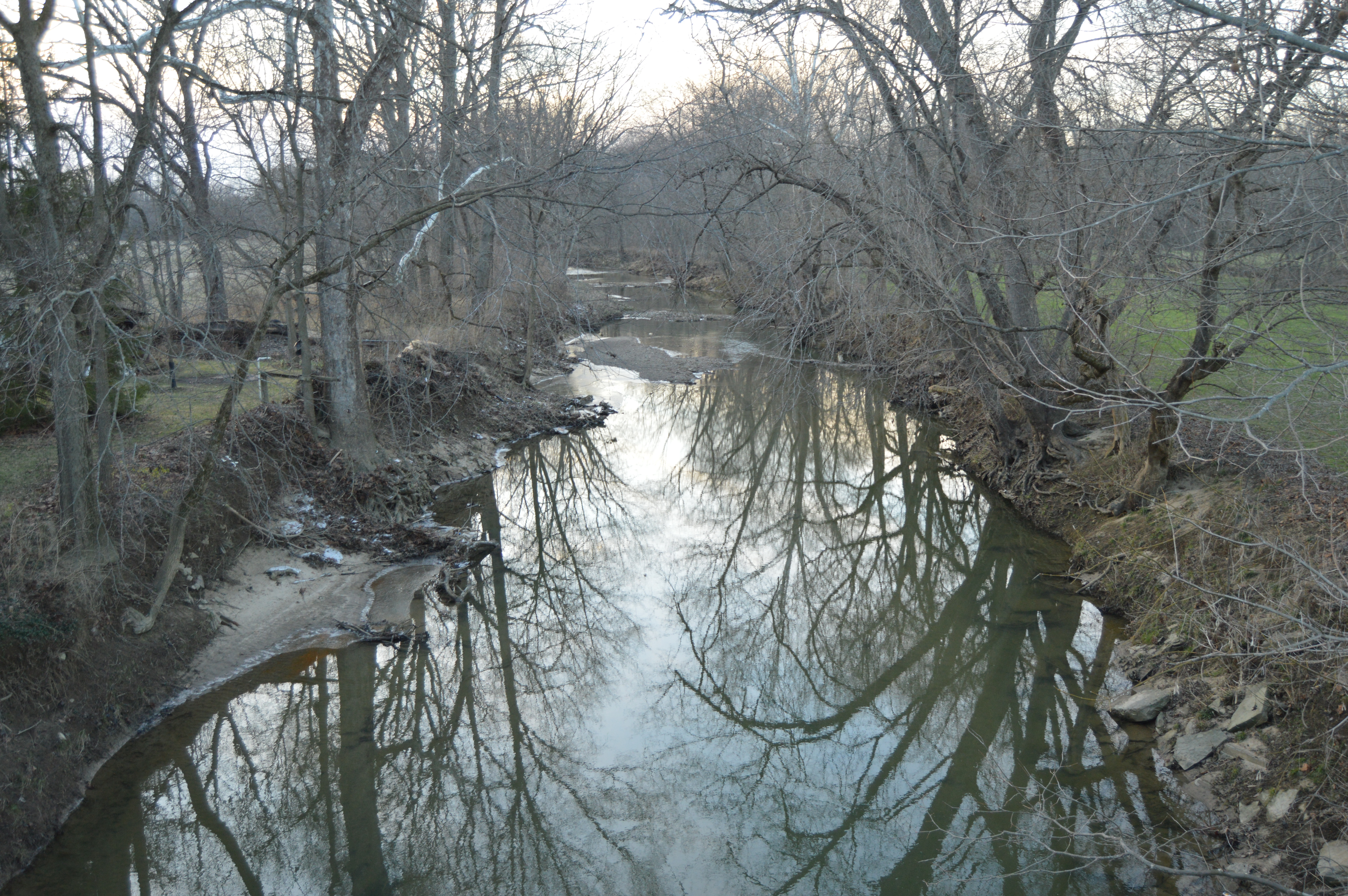
- White Oak Creek north of Sardinia

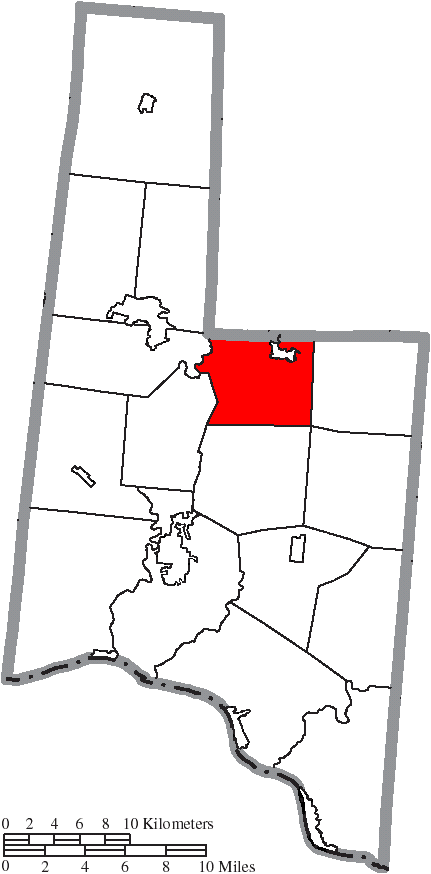
- Location of Washington Township in Brown County
- Coordinates: 39°0′16″N 83°48′59″W
- Country: United States
- State: Ohio
- County: Brown

Area
  - Total: 22.6 sq mi (58.6 km^{2})
  - Land: 22.6 sq mi (58.6 km^{2})
  - Water: 0 sq mi (0.0 km^{2})
- Elevation: 961 ft (293 m)

Population (2020)
  - Total: 2,262
  - Density: 100/sq mi (38.6/km^{2})
- Time zone: UTC-5 (Eastern (EST))
  - Summer (DST): UTC-4 (EDT)
- FIPS code: 39-81102
- GNIS feature ID: 1085807
- Website: https://washingtontownshipbrowncountyohio.com/

Washington Township is one of the sixteen townships of Brown County, Ohio, United States. The 2020 census found 2,262 people in the township.

== Geography ==
Located in the northern part of the county, it borders the following townships:

- Clay Township, Highland County - north
- Whiteoak Township, Highland County - northeast
- Eagle Township - east
- Jackson Township - southeast corner
- Franklin Township - south
- Scott Township - southwest
- Pike Township - west
- Green Township - northwest corner

The village of Sardinia is located in northern Washington Township.

== Name and history ==
It is one of forty-three Washington Townships statewide.

Washington Township was established in 1822.

== Government ==
The township is governed by a three-member board of trustees, who are elected in November of odd-numbered years to a four-year term beginning on the following January 1. Two are elected in the year after the presidential election and one is elected in the year before it. There is also an elected township fiscal officer, who serves a four-year term beginning on April 1 of the year after the election, which is held in November of the year before the presidential election. Vacancies in the fiscal officership or on the board of trustees are filled by the remaining trustees.
