= Scott Township, Brown County, Ohio =

Township in Ohio, US

- Township
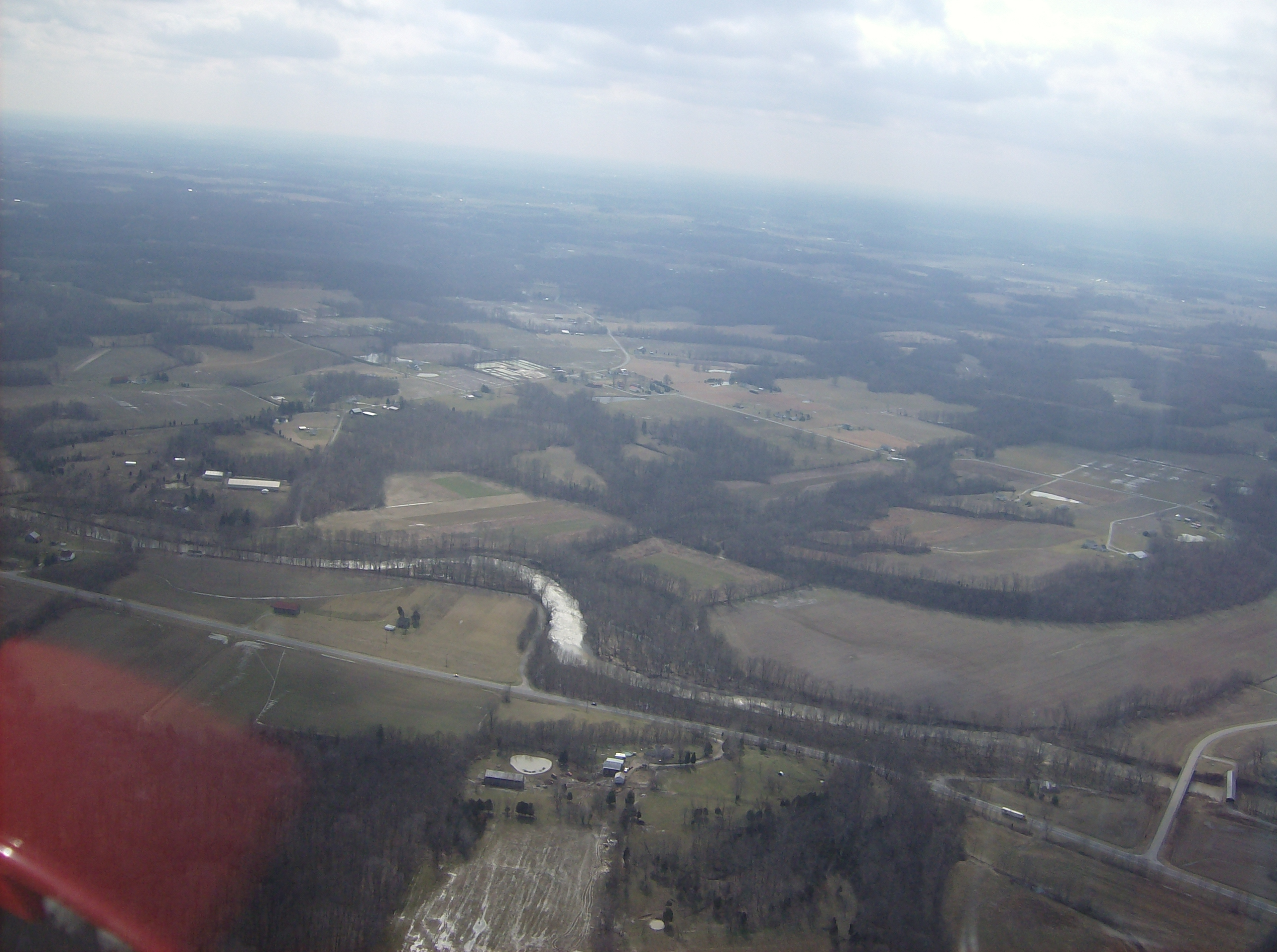
- Along White Oak Creek in central Scott Township

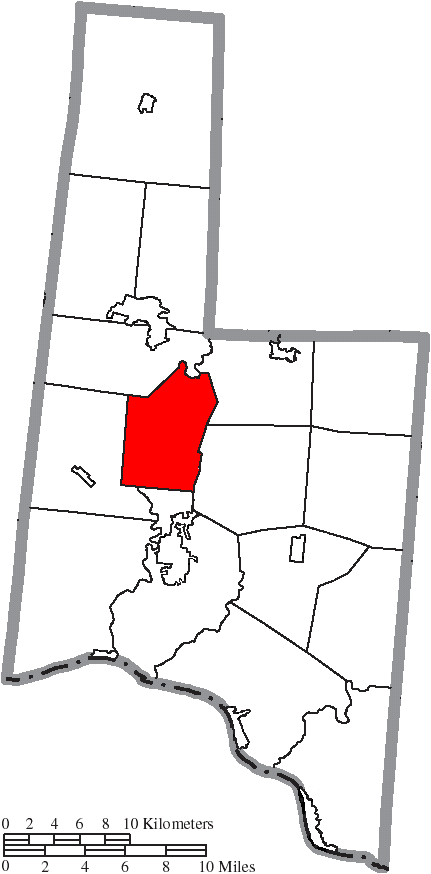
- Location of Scott Township in Brown County
- Coordinates: 38°56′57″N 83°55′2″W
- Country: United States
- State: Ohio
- County: Brown

Area
  - Total: 21.1 sq mi (54.7 km^{2})
  - Land: 21.1 sq mi (54.7 km^{2})
  - Water: 0 sq mi (0.0 km^{2})
- Elevation: 932 ft (284 m)

Population (2020)
  - Total: 1,330
  - Density: 63.0/sq mi (24.3/km^{2})
- Time zone: UTC-5 (Eastern (EST))
  - Summer (DST): UTC-4 (EDT)
- FIPS code: 39-71066
- GNIS feature ID: 1085804

Scott Township is one of the sixteen townships of Brown County, Ohio, United States. The 2020 census found 1,330 people in the township.

== Geography ==
Located in the center of the county, it borders the following townships:

- Pike Township - north
- Washington Township - northeast
- Franklin Township - southeast
- Pleasant Township - south
- Clark Township - west

No municipalities are located in Scott Township.

== Name and history ==
Scott Township was established in 1828.

Statewide, other Scott Townships are located in Adams, Marion, and Sandusky counties.

== Government ==
The township is governed by a three-member board of trustees, who are elected in November of odd-numbered years to a four-year term beginning on the following January 1. Two are elected in the year after the presidential election and one is elected in the year before it. There is also an elected township fiscal officer, who serves a four-year term beginning on April 1 of the year after the election, which is held in November of the year before the presidential election. Vacancies in the fiscal officership or on the board of trustees are filled by the remaining trustees.
