= Winchester Township, Adams County, Ohio =

Township in Ohio, US

- Township
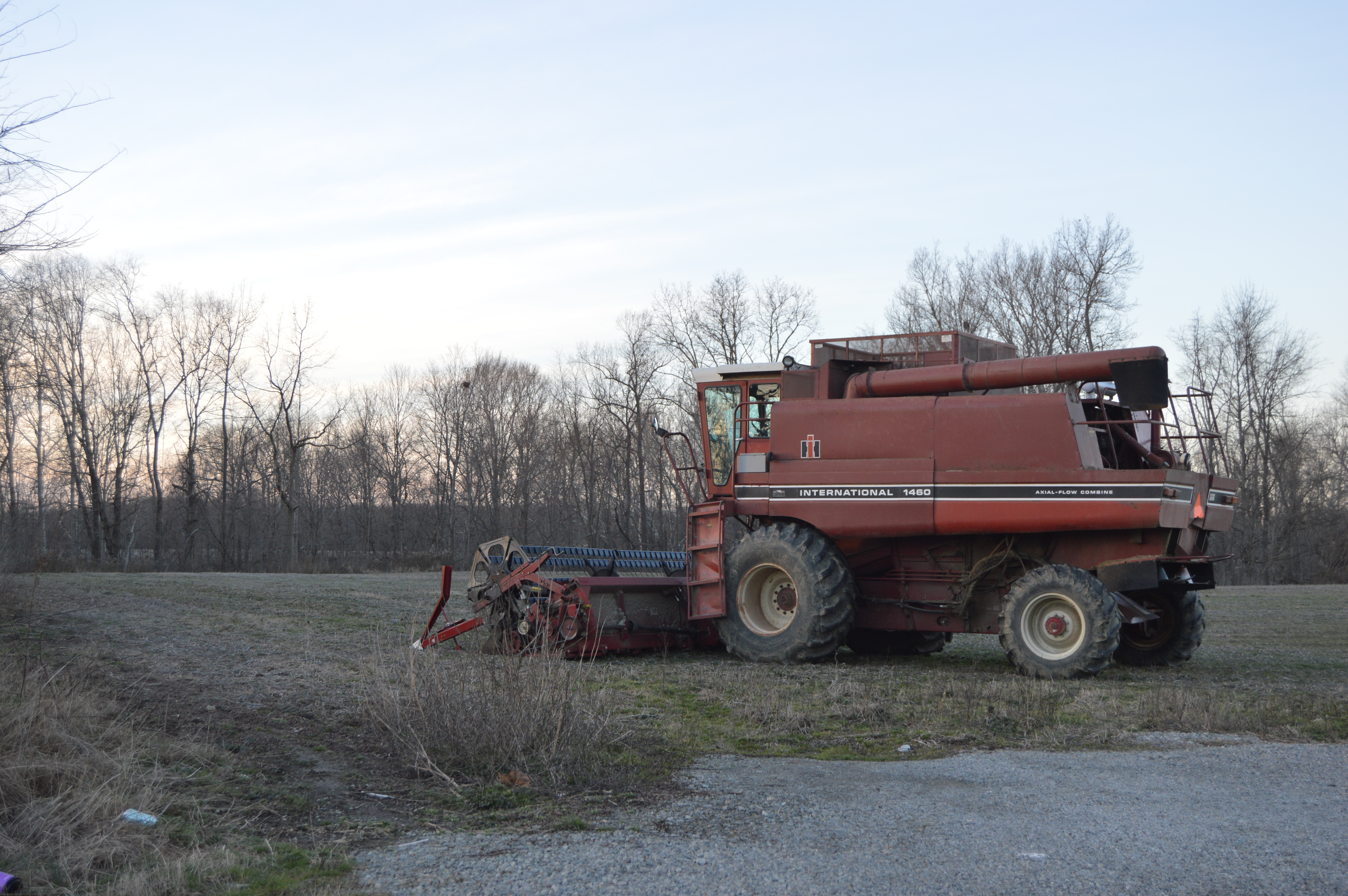
- Agricultural scene west of Winchester

- Location in Adams County and the state of Ohio.
- Coordinates: 38°57′4″N 83°38′51″W
- Country: United States
- State: Ohio
- County: Adams

Area
  - Total: 32.7 sq mi (84.7 km^{2})
  - Land: 32.7 sq mi (84.6 km^{2})
  - Water: 0.039 sq mi (0.1 km^{2})
- Elevation: 971 ft (296 m)

Population (2020)
  - Total: 2,190
  - Density: 68/sq mi (26.1/km^{2})
- Time zone: UTC-5 (Eastern (EST))
  - Summer (DST): UTC-4 (EDT)
- ZIP code: 45697
- Area codes: 937, 326
- FIPS code: 39-85890
- GNIS feature ID: 1085688

Winchester Township is one of the fifteen townships of Adams County, Ohio, United States. The population was 2,190 at the 2020 census.

== Geography ==
Located in the northwestern corner of the county, it borders the following townships:

- Concord Township, Highland County - north
- Scott Township - east
- Wayne Township - south
- Jackson Township, Brown County - southwest
- Eagle Township, Brown County - northwest

The village of Winchester is located in western Winchester Township.

== Name and history ==
Winchester Township was organized in 1838. It is the only Winchester Township statewide.

== Government ==
The township is governed by a three-member board of trustees, who are elected in November of odd-numbered years to a four-year term beginning on the following January 1. Two are elected in the year after the presidential election and one is elected in the year before it. There is also an elected township fiscal officer, who serves a four-year term beginning on April 1 of the year after the election, which is held in November of the year before the presidential election. Vacancies in the fiscal officership or on the board of trustees are filled by the remaining trustees.
