= Pleasant Township, Brown County, Ohio =

Township in Ohio, US

- Township
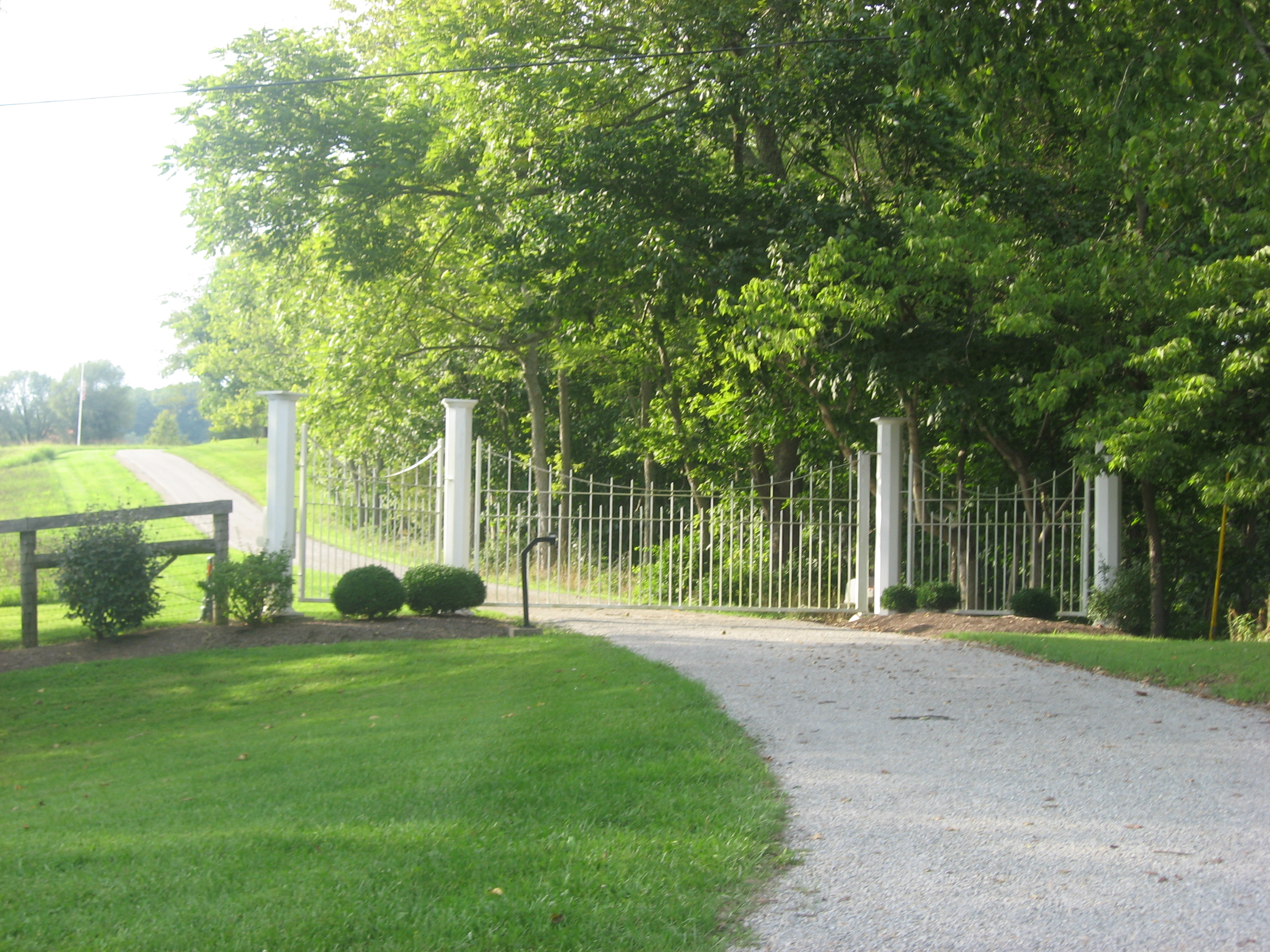
- Woods and a farm gate west of Georgetown

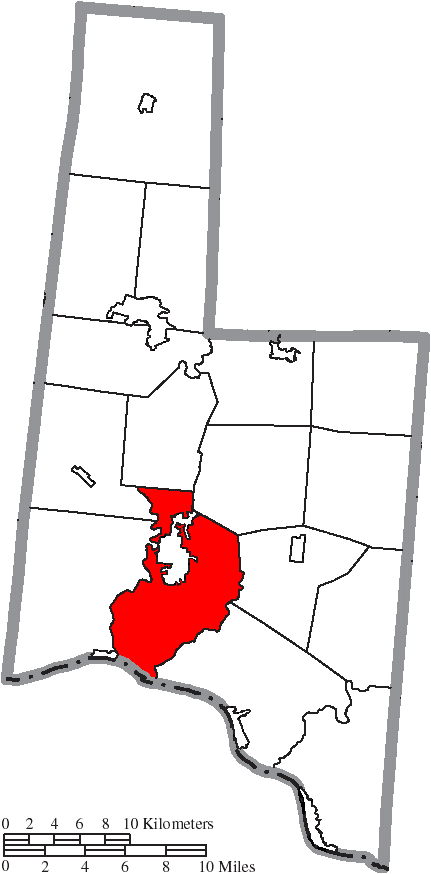
- Location of Pleasant Township in Brown County
- Coordinates: 38°51′26″N 83°54′3″W
- Country: United States
- State: Ohio
- County: Brown

Area
  - Total: 36.2 sq mi (93.8 km^{2})
  - Land: 35.8 sq mi (92.8 km^{2})
  - Water: 0.39 sq mi (1.0 km^{2})
- Elevation: 922 ft (281 m)

Population (2020)
  - Total: 5,643
  - Density: 157/sq mi (60.8/km^{2})
- Time zone: UTC-5 (Eastern (EST))
  - Summer (DST): UTC-4 (EDT)
- FIPS code: 39-63212
- GNIS feature ID: 1085803

Pleasant Township is one of the sixteen townships of Brown County, Ohio, United States. The 2020 census found 5,643 people in the township.

== Geography ==
Located in the southern part of the county along the Ohio River, it borders the following townships:

- Scott Township - north
- Franklin Township - northeast
- Jefferson Township - east
- Union Township - southeast
- Lewis Township - west
- Clark Township - northwest

Bracken County, Kentucky lies across the Ohio River to the south.

The village of Georgetown, the county seat of Brown County, is located in northern Pleasant Township.

== Name and history ==
It is one of fifteen Pleasant Townships statewide.

Pleasant Township was established in 1801. In 1833, eighteen mills operated in Pleasant Township.

== Government ==
The township is governed by a three-member board of trustees, who are elected in November of odd-numbered years to a four-year term beginning on the following January 1. Two are elected in the year after the presidential election and one is elected in the year before it. There is also an elected township fiscal officer, who serves a four-year term beginning on April 1 of the year after the election, which is held in November of the year before the presidential election. Vacancies in the fiscal officership or on the board of trustees are filled by the remaining trustees.
