= Higginsport, Ohio =

- Village
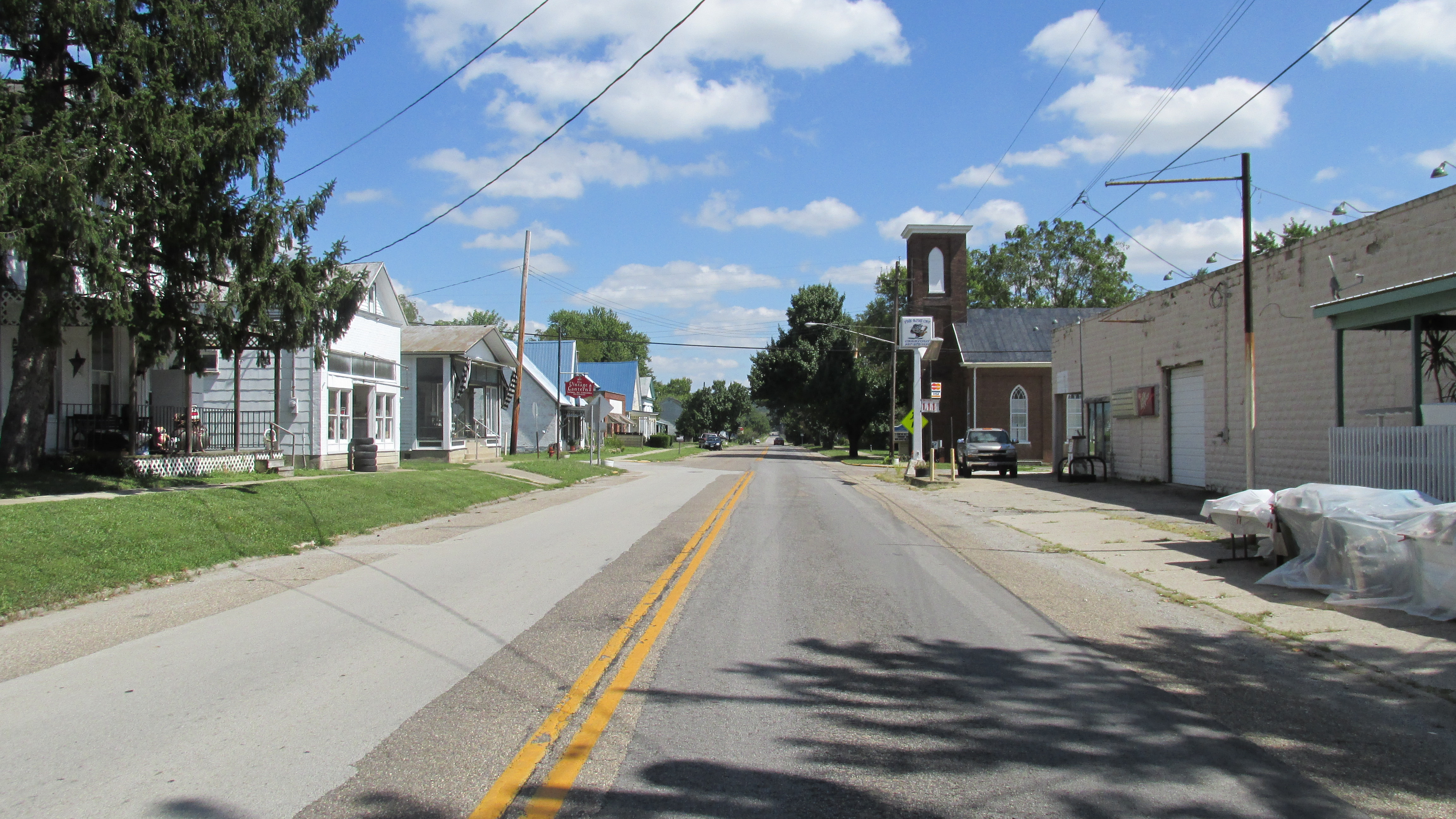
- Looking east on Columbia Street (U.S. Route 52) in Higginsport

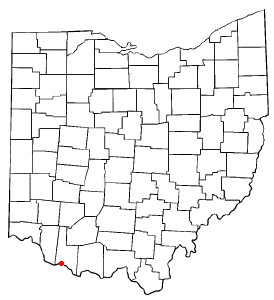
- Location of Higginsport, Ohio

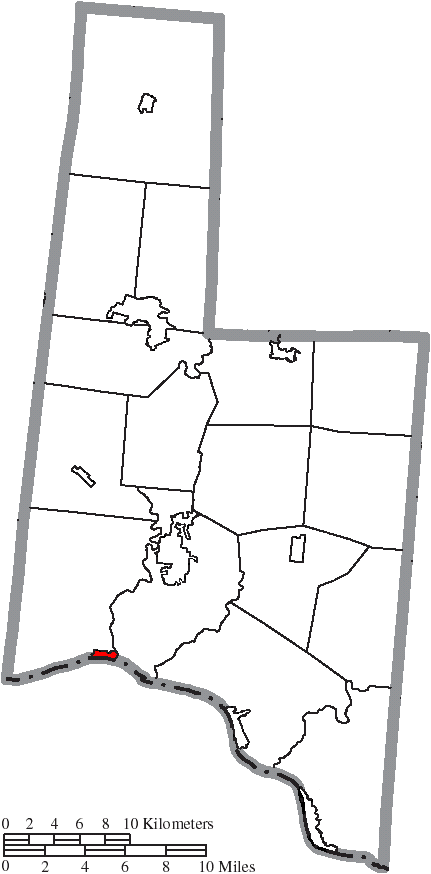
- Location of Higginsport in Brown County
- Coordinates: 38°47′24″N 83°58′02″W
- Country: United States
- State: Ohio
- County: Brown
- Township: Lewis

Government
  - Mayor: Lester Beair

Area
  - Total: 0.29 sq mi (0.76 km^{2})
  - Land: 0.25 sq mi (0.65 km^{2})
  - Water: 0.042 sq mi (0.11 km^{2})
- Elevation: 515 ft (157 m)

Population (2020)
  - Total: 213
  - Estimate (2023): 216
  - Density: 849.2/sq mi (327.88/km^{2})
- Time zone: UTC-5 (Eastern (EST))
  - Summer (DST): UTC-4 (EDT)
- ZIP code: 45131
- Area codes: 937 & 326
- FIPS code: 39-35168
- GNIS feature ID: 2398502
- Website: higginsport-ohio.org

Higginsport is a village in Lewis Township, Brown County, Ohio, United States, along the Ohio River. The population was 213 at the 2020 census.

== History ==
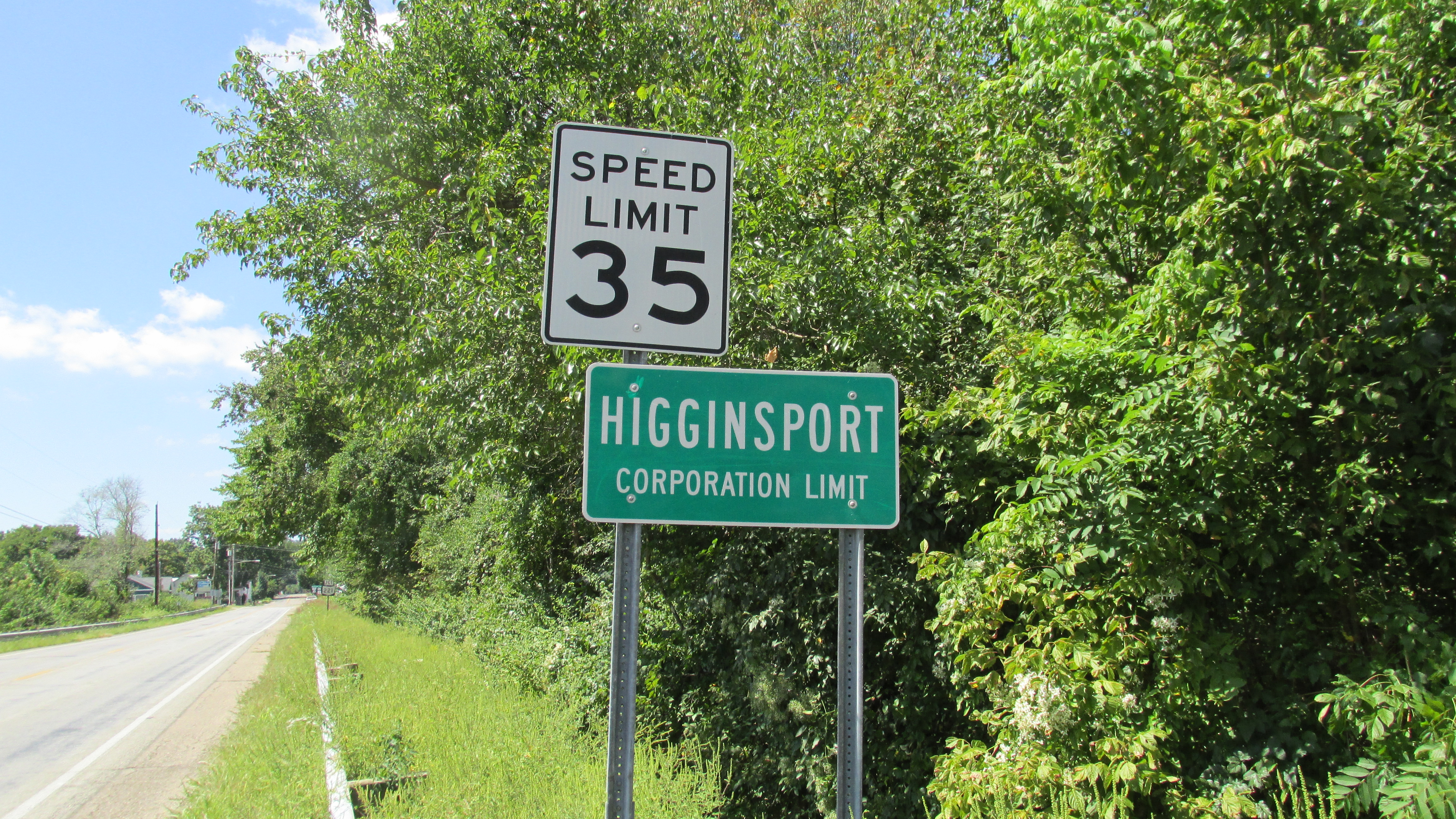
Higginsport corporation limit sign

Col. Robert Higgins was a Revolutionary War officer who had received 1,000 acres (400 ha) of land in Brown County, Ohio for his service to his country. He and his family first moved onto the land in 1799, building a small crude cabin near what is now Higginsport. On September 1, 1804, Higgins started surveying a new community named White Haven on his land, and that same month it was platted and recorded in Williamsburg. The community never grew, and after a number of years, was abandoned. On February 28, 1816, Higgins again replatted the community, this time with 114 lots, and renamed it Higginsport. The street layout mostly followed the original White Haven lines. Higgins also donated a small cemetery (his wife the first person buried here) to the town, as well as land in the center of town for a public park, and about 15 acres (6.1 ha) on the edge of town called White Oak Bottom. The first church was organized in 1818, and by 1819, there were 6 cabins here and a population of 6, but the community was growing. In 1828, a small store opened, which was expanded in 1832. In 1835, the first brick house was built in town, by Jesse Dugan, then owner of the store. Located at the corner of Water and Brown Streets, it was still standing in 2013. The Higgingsport Post Office was established on January 24, 1829, with a Mr. Roberts, the town tailor, as Post Master. Two more stores were opened in town in 1835 and 1839.

In 1880, the population was 862, and as of 1883, the community was described as a "thriving village", containing in total five general stores, one clothing store, two drug stores, two tin shops, one hardware store, four fancy stores, one tobacco store, several grocery stores, two blacksmiths, one wagon-maker, one tavern, a grist mill, a distillery, five doctors, and two hotels.

White burley tobacco was first grown near Higginsport in 1864 from seed brought from Kentucky, and by the 1880s, the local economy was largely based on it. In 1883, there were seventeen tobacco warehouses and 32 different tobacco buyers, shipping approx. 2 million pounds annually down the Ohio River to New Orleans.

Two centuries of fires and floods have taken their toll on the communities original homes and businesses along the river front.

== Geography ==
Higginsport is located in the southeastern part of Lewis Township near the mouth of White Oak Creek.

According to the United States Census Bureau, the village has a total area of 0.29 square miles (0.75 km^{2}), of which 0.25 square miles (0.65 km^{2}) is land and 0.04 square miles (0.10 km^{2}) is water.

== Demographics ==
Historical population
Census	Pop.	Note	%±
1840	393		—
1850	535		36.1%
1860	507		−5.2%
1870	530		4.5%
1880	762		43.8%
1890	764		0.3%
1900	650		−14.9%
1910	417		−35.8%
1920	353		−15.3%
1930	374		5.9%
1940	373		−0.3%
1950	385		3.2%
1960	412		7.0%
1970	383		−7.0%
1980	343		−10.4%
1990	298		−13.1%
2000	291		−2.3%
2010	251		−13.7%
2020	213		−15.1%
2023 (est.)	216	▲	1.4%
U.S. Decennial Census

=== 2010 census ===
As of the census of 2010, there were 251 people, 104 households, and 65 families living in the village. The population density was 1,004.0 inhabitants per square mile (387.6/km^{2}). There were 138 housing units at an average density of 552.0 per square mile (213.1/km^{2}). The racial makeup of the village was 96.8% White, 0.4% Native American, 0.8% from other races, and 2.0% from two or more races. Hispanic or Latino of any race were 1.2% of the population.

There were 104 households, of which 26.9% had children under the age of 18 living with them, 44.2% were married couples living together, 11.5% had a female householder with no husband present, 6.7% had a male householder with no wife present, and 37.5% were non-families. 32.7% of all households were made up of individuals, and 19.2% had someone living alone who was 65 years of age or older. The average household size was 2.41 and the average family size was 2.94.

The median age in the village was 44.5 years. 19.5% of residents were under the age of 18; 10.5% were between the ages of 18 and 24; 20.4% were from 25 to 44; 31.2% were from 45 to 64; and 18.7% were 65 years of age or older. The gender makeup of the village was 49.0% male and 51.0% female.

=== 2000 census ===
As of the census of 2000, there were 291 people, 114 households, and 77 families living in the village. The population density was 1,305.0 inhabitants per square mile (503.9/km^{2}). There were 134 housing units at an average density of 600.9 per square mile (232.0/km^{2}). The racial makeup of the village was 99.31% White, and 0.69% from two or more races. Hispanic or Latino of any race were 0.34% of the population.

There were 114 households, out of which 29.8% had children under the age of 18 living with them, 58.8% were married couples living together, 8.8% had a female householder with no husband present, and 31.6% were non-families. 30.7% of all households were made up of individuals, and 13.2% had someone living alone who was 65 years of age or older. The average household size was 2.55 and the average family size was 3.18.

In the village, the population was spread out, with 25.8% under the age of 18, 5.8% from 18 to 24, 27.1% from 25 to 44, 23.7% from 45 to 64, and 17.5% who were 65 years of age or older. The median age was 40 years. For every 100 females, there were 92.7 males. For every 100 females age 18 and over, there were 77.0 males.

The median income for a household in the village was $32,000, and the median income for a family was $37,188. Males had a median income of $30,625 versus $20,000 for females. The per capita income for the village was $10,989. About 9.6% of families and 11.5% of the population were below the poverty line, including 10.5% of those under the age of eighteen and 8.8% of those 65 or over.

== Notable person ==
- Slim Sallee, professional baseball player who played for the 1919 World Series Champion Cincinnati Reds.

== See also ==
- List of cities and towns along the Ohio River
