= Hamersville, Ohio =

- Village
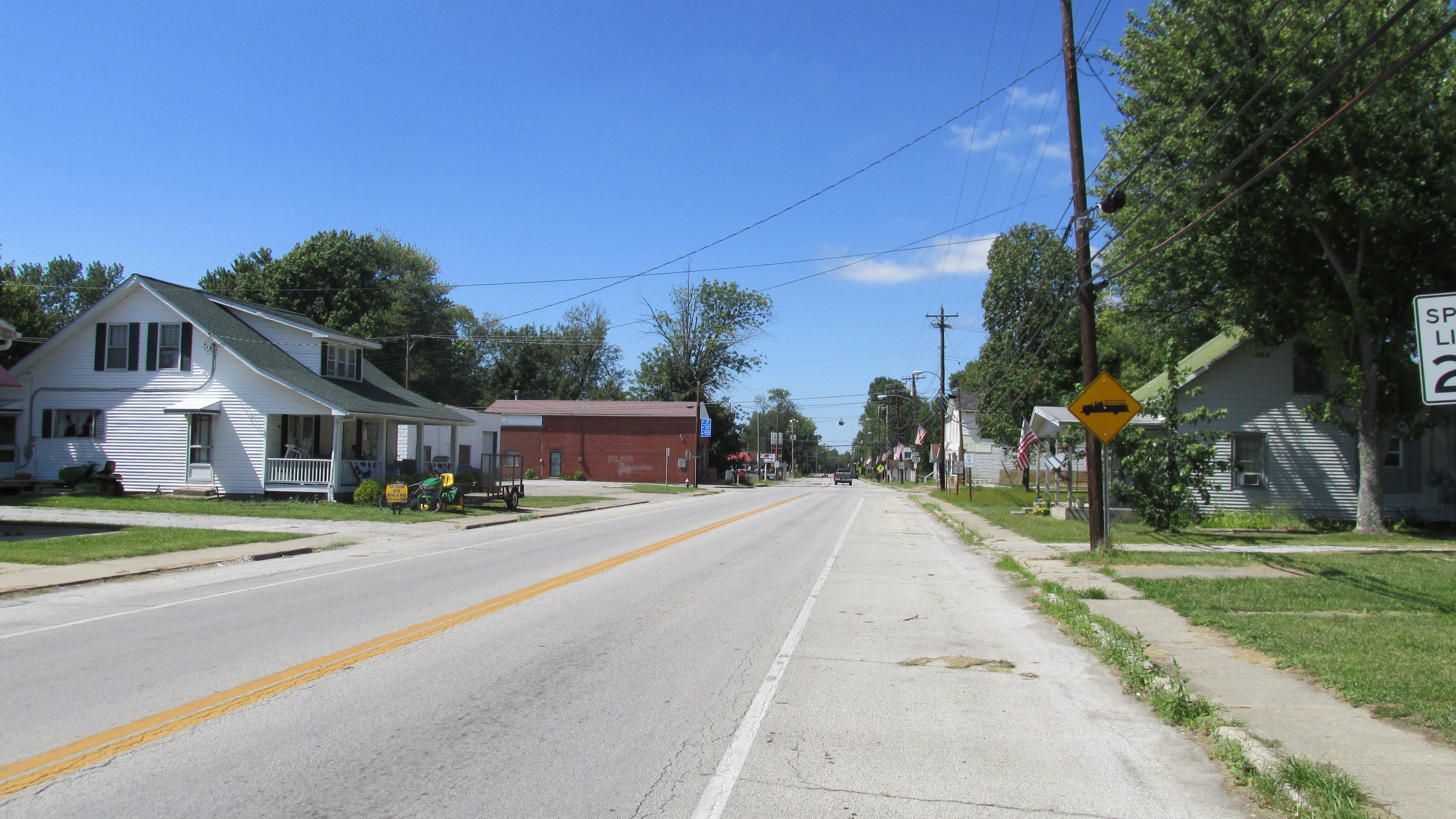
- Looking northwest on Main Street (Ohio State Route 125) in Hamersville

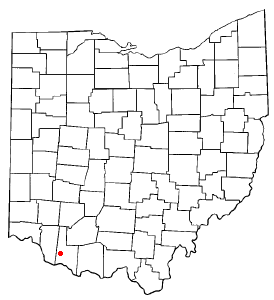
- Location of Hamersville, Ohio

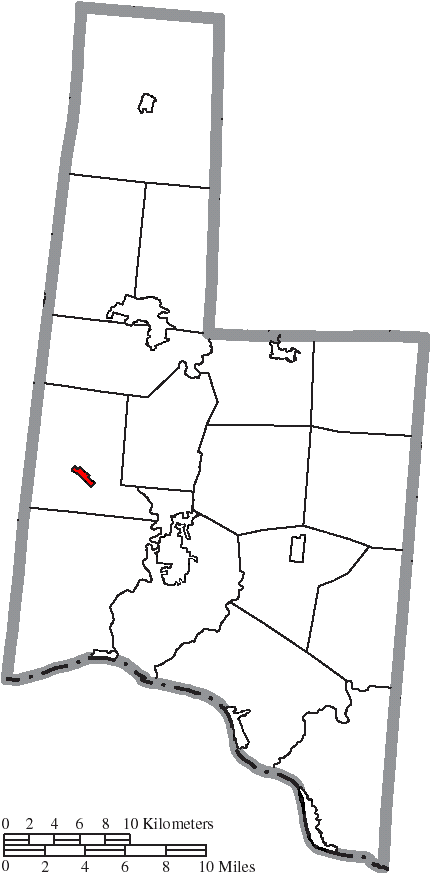
- Location of Hamersville in Brown County
- Coordinates: 38°55′08″N 83°59′07″W
- Country: United States
- State: Ohio
- County: Brown
- Township: Clark

Government
  - Mayor: Justin Jones

Area
  - Total: 0.44 sq mi (1.13 km^{2})
  - Land: 0.44 sq mi (1.13 km^{2})
  - Water: 0 sq mi (0.00 km^{2})
- Elevation: 968 ft (295 m)

Population (2020)
  - Total: 485
  - Estimate (2023): 487
  - Density: 1,108.3/sq mi (427.92/km^{2})
- Time zone: UTC-5 (Eastern (EST))
  - Summer (DST): UTC-4 (EDT)
- ZIP code: 45130
- Area codes: 937, 326
- FIPS code: 39-32984
- GNIS feature ID: 2398230

Hamersville (/ˈheɪmərzvɪl/ HAY-mərz-vil) is a village in Clark Township, Brown County, Ohio, United States. The population was 485 at the 2020 census.

== History ==
Hamersville was laid out in 1838. It was named for Thomas Hamer, then a congressman, and later a general in the Mexican–American War.

== Geography ==
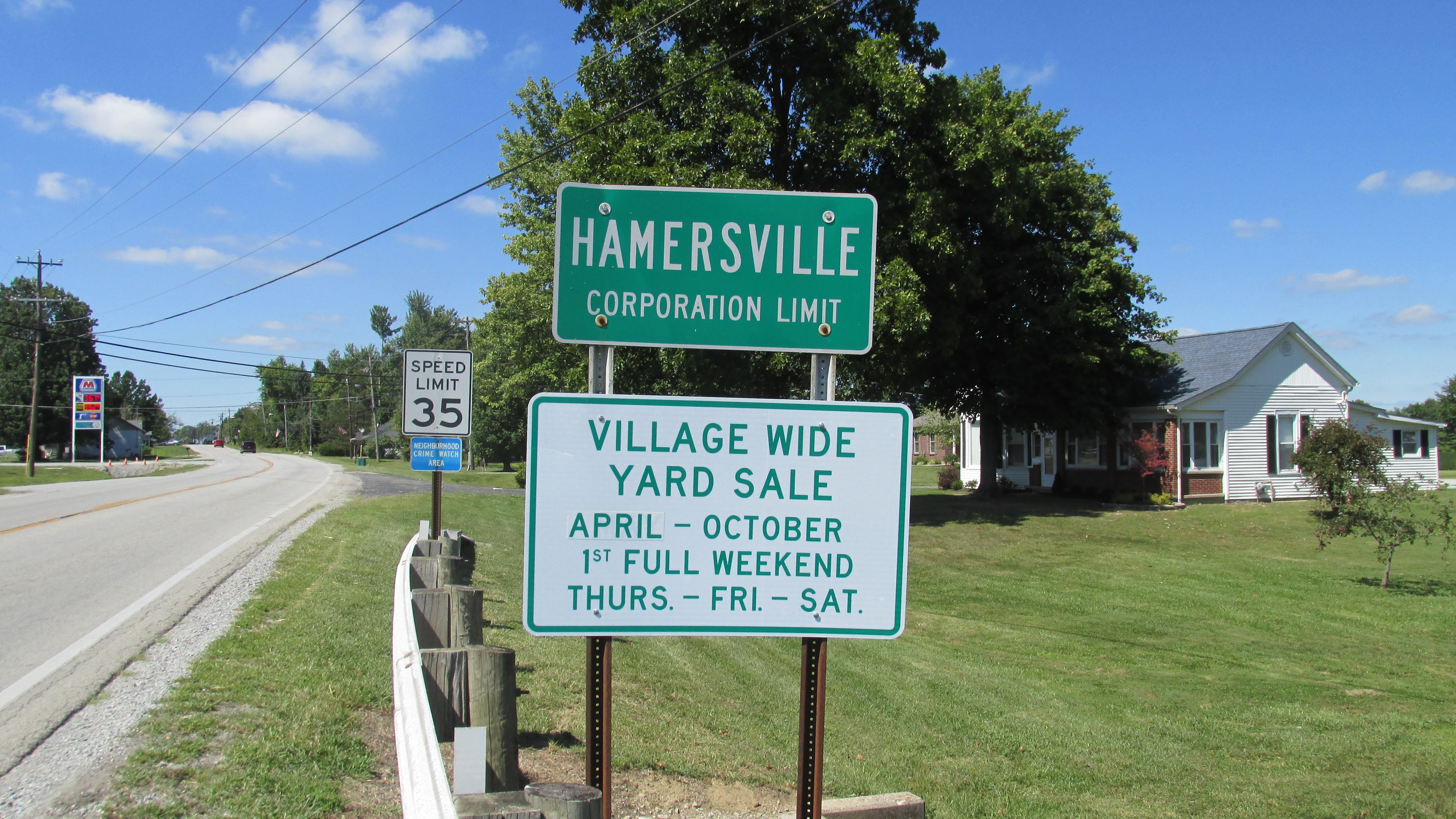
Hamersville corporation limit sign

According to the United States Census Bureau, the village has a total area of 0.39 square miles (1.01 km^{2}), all land.

== Demographics ==
Historical population
Census	Pop.	Note	%±
1880	231		—
1890	264		14.3%
1900	242		−8.3%
1910	276		14.0%
1920	235		−14.9%
1930	267		13.6%
1940	349		30.7%
1950	380		8.9%
1960	524		37.9%
1970	567		8.2%
1980	688		21.3%
1990	586		−14.8%
2000	515		−12.1%
2010	546		6.0%
2020	485		−11.2%
2023 (est.)	487	▲	0.4%
U.S. Decennial Census

=== 2010 census ===
As of the census of 2010, there were 546 people, 188 households, and 143 families living in the village. The population density was 1,400.0 inhabitants per square mile (540.5/km^{2}). There were 206 housing units at an average density of 528.2 per square mile (203.9/km^{2}). The racial makeup of the village was 98.2% White, 0.2% Asian, 0.5% from other races, and 1.1% from two or more races. Hispanic or Latino of any race were 0.5% of the population.

There were 188 households, of which 43.6% had children under the age of 18 living with them, 54.8% were married couples living together, 15.4% had a female householder with no husband present, 5.9% had a male householder with no wife present, and 23.9% were non-families. 19.1% of all households were made up of individuals, and 7.5% had someone living alone who was 65 years of age or older. The average household size was 2.90 and the average family size was 3.27.

The median age in the village was 34.5 years. 29.3% of residents were under the age of 18; 8.6% were between the ages of 18 and 24; 29.3% were from 25 to 44; 22.9% were from 45 to 64; and 9.9% were 65 years of age or older. The gender makeup of the village was 50.0% male and 50.0% female.

=== 2000 census ===
As of the census of 2000, there were 515 people, 180 households, and 142 families living in the village. The population density was 1,376.6 inhabitants per square mile (531.5/km^{2}). There were 190 housing units at an average density of 507.9 per square mile (196.1/km^{2}). The racial makeup of the village was 99.61% White, 0.19% African American, and 0.19% from two or more races.

There were 180 households, out of which 38.9% had children under the age of 18 living with them, 63.3% were married couples living together, 11.7% had a female householder with no husband present, and 21.1% were non-families. 17.8% of all households were made up of individuals, and 7.2% had someone living alone who was 65 years of age or older. The average household size was 2.86 and the average family size was 3.21.

In the village, the population was spread out, with 28.7% under the age of 18, 10.3% from 18 to 24, 32.8% from 25 to 44, 18.4% from 45 to 64, and 9.7% who were 65 years of age or older. The median age was 32 years. For every 100 females there were 88.0 males. For every 100 females age 18 and over, there were 97.3 males.

The median income for a household in the village was $34,063, and the median income for a family was $41,250. Males had a median income of $30,875 versus $19,375 for females. The per capita income for the village was $14,471. About 5.3% of families and 6.4% of the population were below the poverty line, including 5.5% of those under age 18 and 4.1% of those age 65 or over.

== Notable person ==
- Albert Nelson Marquis, founder of Who's Who
