= Franklin Township, Clermont County, Ohio =

Township in Ohio, US

- Township
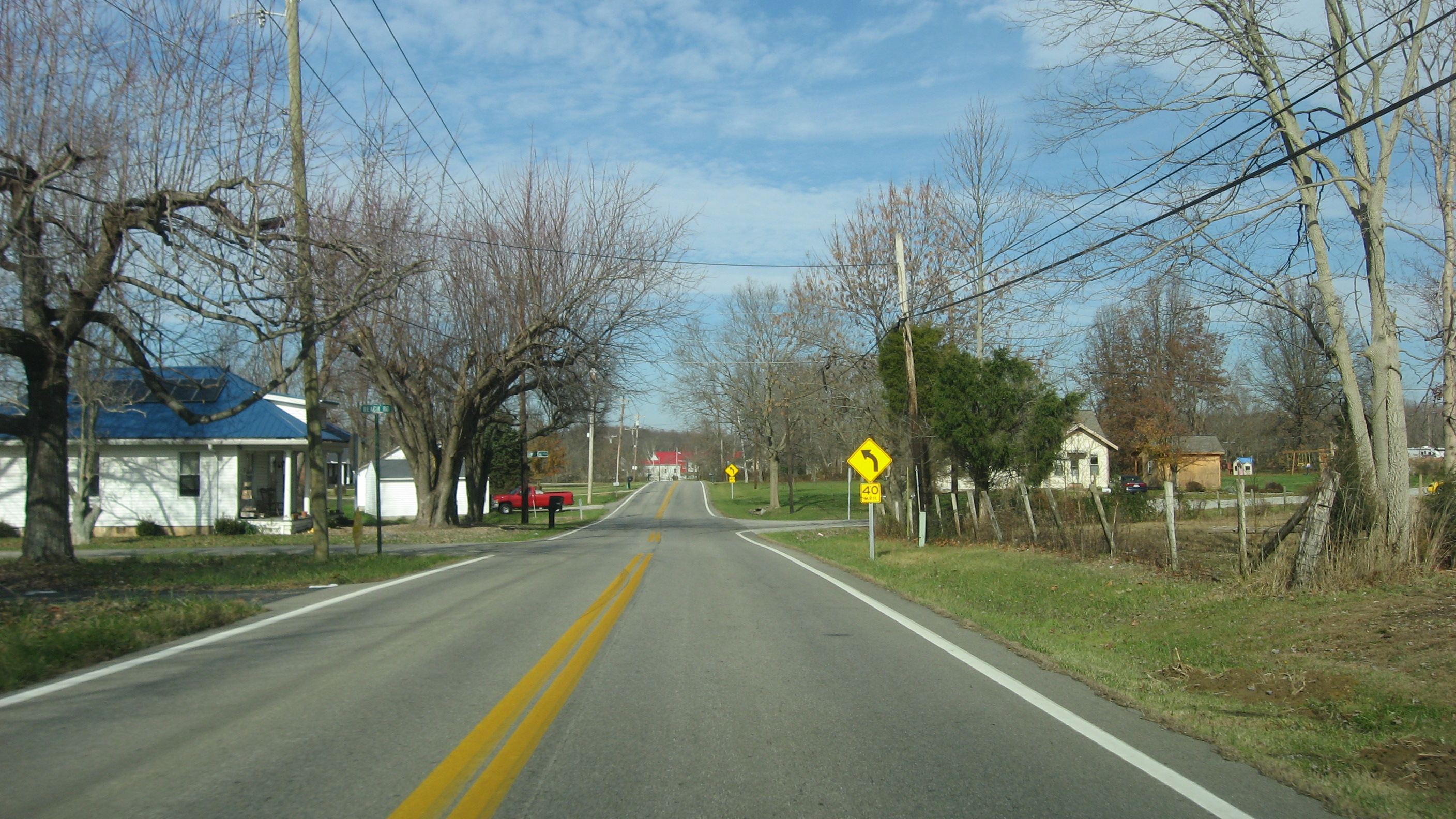
- State Route 133 at Mount Olive, north of Felicity

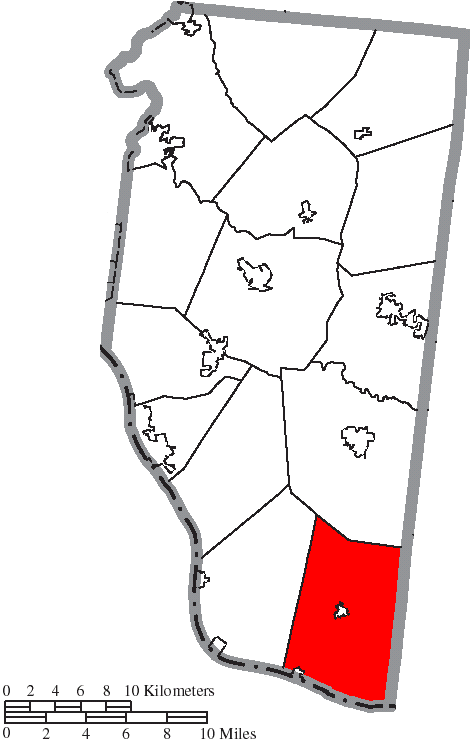
- Location of Franklin Township in Clermont County
- Coordinates: 38°49′55″N 84°5′58″W
- Country: United States
- State: Ohio
- County: Clermont

Area
  - Total: 40.2 sq mi (104.0 km^{2})
  - Land: 39.3 sq mi (101.9 km^{2})
  - Water: 0.81 sq mi (2.1 km^{2})
- Elevation: 843 ft (257 m)

Population (2020)
  - Total: 3,604
  - Density: 106/sq mi (41.1/km^{2})
- Time zone: UTC-5 (Eastern (EST))
  - Summer (DST): UTC-4 (EDT)
- FIPS code: 39-28224
- GNIS feature ID: 1085862
- Website: franklintownshipoh.org

Franklin Township is one of the fourteen townships of Clermont County, Ohio, United States. The population was 3,604 at the 2020 census.

== Geography ==
Located in the southeastern corner of the county along the Ohio River, it borders the following townships:

- Tate Township - north
- Lewis Township, Brown County - east
- Washington Township - west

Bracken County, Kentucky lies across the Ohio River to the south.

Two incorporated villages are located in Franklin Township: Chilo in the southwest along the Ohio River, and Felicity in the center. As well, the unincorporated community of Utopia lies in the township's south.

== Name and history ==
It is one of 21 Franklin Townships statewide.

== Government ==
The township is governed by a three-member board of trustees, who are elected in November of odd-numbered years to a four-year term beginning on the following January 1. Two are elected in the year after the presidential election and one is elected in the year before it. There is also an elected township fiscal officer, who serves a four-year term beginning on April 1 of the year after the election, which is held in November of the year before the presidential election. Vacancies in the fiscal officership or on the board of trustees are filled by the remaining trustees.
