= Marquis Who's Who =

American publishing company

- Founded: 1898
- Founder: Albert Nelson Marquis
- Country of origin: United States
- Headquarters location: Berkeley Heights, New Jersey
- Distribution: Worldwide
- Key people: Erica Lee, CEO and editor-in-chief
- Nonfiction topics: Biographies
- Official website: marquiswhoswho.com

Marquis Who's Who, also known as A.N. Marquis Company (/ˈmɑːrkwɪs/ or /mɑːrˈkiː/), is an American publisher of a number of directories containing short biographies. The books usually are entitled Who's Who in... followed by some subject, such as Who's Who in America, Who's Who of American Women, Who's Who in Asia, Who's Who in the World, Who's Who in Science and Engineering, Who's Who in American Politics, etc.

Marquis states in its preface that Who's Who in America "endeavors to profile the leaders of American society; those men and women who are influencing their nation's development". Entries in Marquis Who's Who books list career and personal data for each biography, including birth date and place, names of parents and family members, education, writings and creative works, civic activities, awards, political affiliation, religion, and addresses.

== History ==
Founded in 1898 by Albert Nelson Marquis as an American counterpoint to the UK-oriented publication of the same name (published by A.C. Black since 1849 and, notably, including substantial biographies since 1897), the first edition of the publication contained concise biographies of more than 8,500 "distinguished Americans". Albert Marquis wrote that the book's objective was to "chronicle the lives of individuals whose achievements and contributions to society make them subjects of widespread reference interest and inquiry."

Originally independent, it was acquired by the conglomerate ITT. News Communications, Inc., which owns The Hill, bought Marquis in 2003. In 2016, the company's assets, including all the trademarks were transferred to Marquis Who's Who Ventures LLC, which is privately owned.

== Publications ==
=== General publications ===
Marquis publications include:

- Who's Who in America (ISSN 0083-9396)
- Who's Who in the World (ISSN 0083-9825)
- Who's Who in American Art (ISSN 0000-0191)
- Who's Who in American Politics
- Who's Who in the East
- Who's Who in the West
- Who's Who in the Midwest
- Who's Who in the South / Southwest
- Who's Who in Medicine and Healthcare
- Who's Who in Asia
- Who's Who in American Law
- Who's Who in Corporate America (ISSN 2159-9955)
- Who's Who in Science and Engineering
- Who's Who of American Women

=== Historical series ===
- Who Was Who in America ISSN 0146-8081)
- Who's Who in 20th Century America

== Selection process ==
A 2005 New York Times feature describes some aspects of the selection process at the time: "An editorial team of 70, including 12 researchers, make the call on who's notable and who's not".

== As reference source ==
In 1999, Forbes magazine published an article by Tucker Carlson, in which he reported that Marquis profited through direct mail marketers. Forbes adopted Who's Who in America as a source for compiling information on post-graduate success when it began ranking America's most prestigious colleges in 2007. Forbes stopped referencing Marquis Who's Who in 2013, replacing it with various of its own lists, such as Power Women, 30 Under 30, CEOs on the Global 2000, Nobel and Pulitzer prize winners, Guggenheim and MacArthur Fellows, those elected to the National Academy of Sciences, and winners of major Arts awards.

Two statisticians with the Metropolitan Life Insurance Company used inclusion in Who's Who in America in a study conducted 1950–1961, which concluded that people listed in the publication lived longer than their unlisted peers.

== See also ==
- Who's Who § Other publications and scams
