= National Register of Historic Places listings in Brown County, Ohio =

Location of Brown County in Ohio

This is a list of the National Register of Historic Places listings in Brown County, Ohio.

This is intended to be a complete list of the properties and districts on the National Register of Historic Places in Brown County, Ohio, United States. The locations of National Register properties and districts for which the latitude and longitude coordinates are included below, may be seen in a Google map.

There are 26 properties and districts listed on the National Register in the county, including 3 National Historic Landmarks.

This National Park Service list is complete through NPS recent listings posted April 10, 2026.

== Current listings ==
	Name on the Register	Image	Date listed	Location	City or town	Description
1	Aberdeen Mound	Aberdeen Mound	July 15, 1974 (#74001401)	Western side of State Route 41, north of Aberdeen; 38°40′04″N 83°45′47″W	Huntington Township	
2	Bailey-Thompson House	Bailey-Thompson House	November 7, 1976 (#76001373)	112 N. Water St. 38°52′00″N 83°54′05″W	Georgetown	
3	Dr. Philip Buckner House and Barn	Dr. Philip Buckner House and Barn	March 30, 1978 (#78002010)	610 S. Main St. 38°51′39″N 83°54′18″W	Georgetown	
4	Burgett House and Barn	Burgett House and Barn	November 14, 1978 (#78002013)	West of Ripley on White Rd. 38°46′41″N 83°53′44″W	Union Township	
5	Eagle Creek Covered Bridge	Eagle Creek Covered Bridge	December 6, 1975 (#75001324)	3 mi (4.8 km) south of Decatur on State Route 763; 38°40′24″N 83°44′57″W	Byrd Township	Washed away in 1997
6	Eagle Township Works I Mound	Eagle Township Works I Mound	September 10, 1971 (#71000630)	0.5 miles (0.80 km) north of the junction of Fincastle and Mound Rds., east of Fincastle; 38°59′15″N 83°41′47″W	Eagle Township	Near Fincastle
7	Farmers Branch, State Bank of Ohio	Farmers Branch, State Bank of Ohio	April 21, 1983 (#83001946)	14 Front St. 38°44′44″N 83°50′48″W	Ripley	
8	Georgetown Historic District	Georgetown Historic District	May 23, 1978 (#78002011)	Roughly bounded by Water Alley, Pleasant, Short, and State Sts. 38°51′58″N 83°54′15″W	Georgetown	
9	Georgetown Public School	Georgetown Public School	January 25, 1991 (#90002215)	307 W. Grant Ave. 38°51′56″N 83°54′26″W	Georgetown	
10	Ulysses S. Grant Boyhood Home	Ulysses S. Grant Boyhood Home	October 8, 1976 (#76001374)	219 E. Grant Ave. 38°51′57″N 83°54′33″W	Georgetown	
11	Higginsport School	Higginsport School	January 14, 2000 (#99001685)	Junction of Jackson and Gaines Sts. 38°47′27″N 83°58′06″W	Higginsport	
12	Henry Martin Farm	Henry Martin Farm	August 15, 1975 (#75001326)	2 mi (3.2 km) north of Ripley on U.S. Route 68; 38°46′43″N 83°51′24″W	Union Township	
13	Maysville-Aberdeen Bridge	Maysville-Aberdeen Bridge	June 30, 1983 (#83002823)	Spans the Ohio River between Aberdeen and Maysville, Kentucky; 38°39′19″N 83°45′27″W	Aberdeen	Extends into Mason County, Kentucky
14	Mount Orab Station	Mount Orab Station	October 14, 1975 (#75001325)	N. Mill and Front Sts. 39°01′46″N 83°55′01″W	Mount Orab	
15	Daniel Murphy Log House	Daniel Murphy Log House	June 17, 1982 (#82003548)	Anderson State Rd., southwest of St. Martin; 39°12′19″N 83°54′24″W	Perry Township	
16	John P. Parker House	John P. Parker House	January 7, 1980 (#80002944)	300 Front St. 38°45′00″N 83°50′58″W	Ripley	Designated a National Historic Landmark in 1997
17	Pisgah Christian Church	Pisgah Christian Church	November 21, 1980 (#80002945)	Northwest of Ripley on Pisgah Ridge Rd. 38°46′57″N 83°52′48″W	Union Township	
18	John Rankin House	John Rankin House	November 10, 1970 (#70000485)	East of downtown Ripley on Liberty Hill; 38°45′02″N 83°50′36″W	Ripley	
19	Red Oak Presbyterian Church	Red Oak Presbyterian Church	June 17, 1982 (#82003547)	Cemetery Rd., north of Ripley; 38°47′44″N 83°47′44″W	Union Township	
20	Ripley Historic District	Ripley Historic District	March 7, 1985 (#85000552)	Roughly bounded by Main, Front, 2nd, 3rd and 4th Sts. 38°44′45″N 83°50′41″W	Ripley	
21	Stonehurst	Stonehurst	October 10, 1975 (#75001327)	2 mi (3.2 km) north of Ripley off U.S. Route 68; 38°46′56″N 83°51′22″W	Union Township	
22	Sutton House	Sutton House	March 25, 1977 (#77001043)	0.3 mi (0.48 km) east of Decatur on State Route 125; 38°48′49″N 83°41′54″W	Byrd Township	Destroyed
23	Thompson Farm	Thompson Farm	January 1, 1976 (#76001375)	West of Georgetown off State Route 221; 38°51′58″N 83°55′23″W	Pleasant Township	
24	Thompson-Bullock House	Thompson-Bullock House	February 23, 1978 (#78002012)	West of Georgetown off State Route 221; 38°51′59″N 83°55′23″W	Pleasant Township	
25	Thumann Log House	Thumann Log House	March 27, 1975 (#75001328)	1 mi (1.6 km) south of St. Martin at the junction of U.S. Route 50 and State Route 251; 39°11′28″N 83°53′51″W	Perry Township	
26	Ursuline Center	Ursuline Center	June 29, 1976 (#76001372)	Northeast of Fayetteville off State Route 251; 39°12′35″N 83°53′15″W	Perry Township	

== See also ==
- List of National Historic Landmarks in Ohio
- Listings in neighboring counties: Adams, Bracken (KY), Clermont, Clinton, Highland, Mason (KY)
- National Register of Historic Places listings in Ohio
