= Pisgah Christian Church =

- U.S. National Register of Historic Places
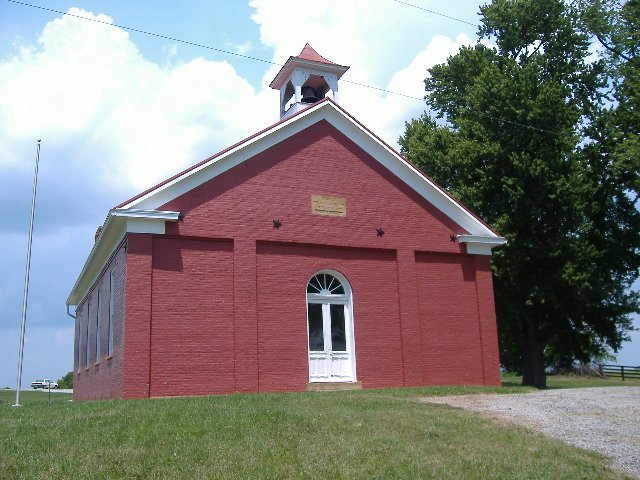
- Front and western side of the church

- Location within Ohio Location within the United States
- Location: Pisgah Rd., northwest of Ripley, Ohio
- Coordinates: 38°46′57″N 83°52′48″W
- Area: 1 acre (0.40 ha)
- Built: 1854
- NRHP reference No.: 80002945
- Added to NRHP: November 21, 1980

Pisgah Christian Church is a historic Church of Christ house of worship located outside of Ripley in rural Brown County, Ohio, United States. Constructed in the 1850s for a quarter-century-old congregation, it has been designated a historic site.

The earliest settlers in the vicinity of Pisgah Ridge arrived during the territorial days, shortly before 1800. In 1810, the first Church of Christ in Brown County was founded along Eagle Creek, and the group that became Pisgah Christian Church was founded in 1824; it was one of five in the county founded between 1818 and 1826. The founding preacher, Elder Matthew Garner, remained active in the area; he formally organized Pisgah in 1829, and he participated in the establishment of another Church of Christ in the nearby village of Ripley in the 1840s. A native of Rensselaer County, New York, ten-year-old Gardner had moved with his family to present-day Brown County in 1800. He became a Church of Christ preacher in 1812 and was ordained in 1818, and almost immediately began starting churches in southwestern Ohio. At the close of his life, he claimed to have begun twenty-two congregations and estimated that his preaching had seen more than six thousand conversions.

Pisgah is a brick building with a foundation of limestone, a tin roof, and additional elements of wood and stone. An arched main entrance is the only opening in the gable-front facade, while four rectangular windows are placed in the single-story side. A small belfry sits atop the roof above the main entrance, while a partial pediment creates the gable. Trees are scattered around the church property. The overall structure is typical of vernacular buildings of the period, including the slight influence of adapted Greek Revival elements such as the pediment. Pisgah's first building was a log structure on the same property as the present building, and the present building was erected in 1854. Despite the passage of more than a century and a half, it has experienced almost no changes; no other nineteenth-century church in Brown County retains a comparable degree of integrity. Modernizations such as the installation of plumbing and electricity have never been performed at Pisgah, and the immediate environment remains in use as a quiet rural farming area.

In 1980, Pisgah Christian Church was listed on the National Register of Historic Places, qualifying because of its historically significant architecture. It is one of five Union Township locations on the Register, along with the Burgett House and Barn on White Road, the Henry Martin Farm and the Stonehurst (Ripley, Ohio) farmstead on U.S. Route 68, and Red Oak Presbyterian Church on Cemetery Road.
