= William Otis Crosby =

American geologist and engineer

William O. Crosby
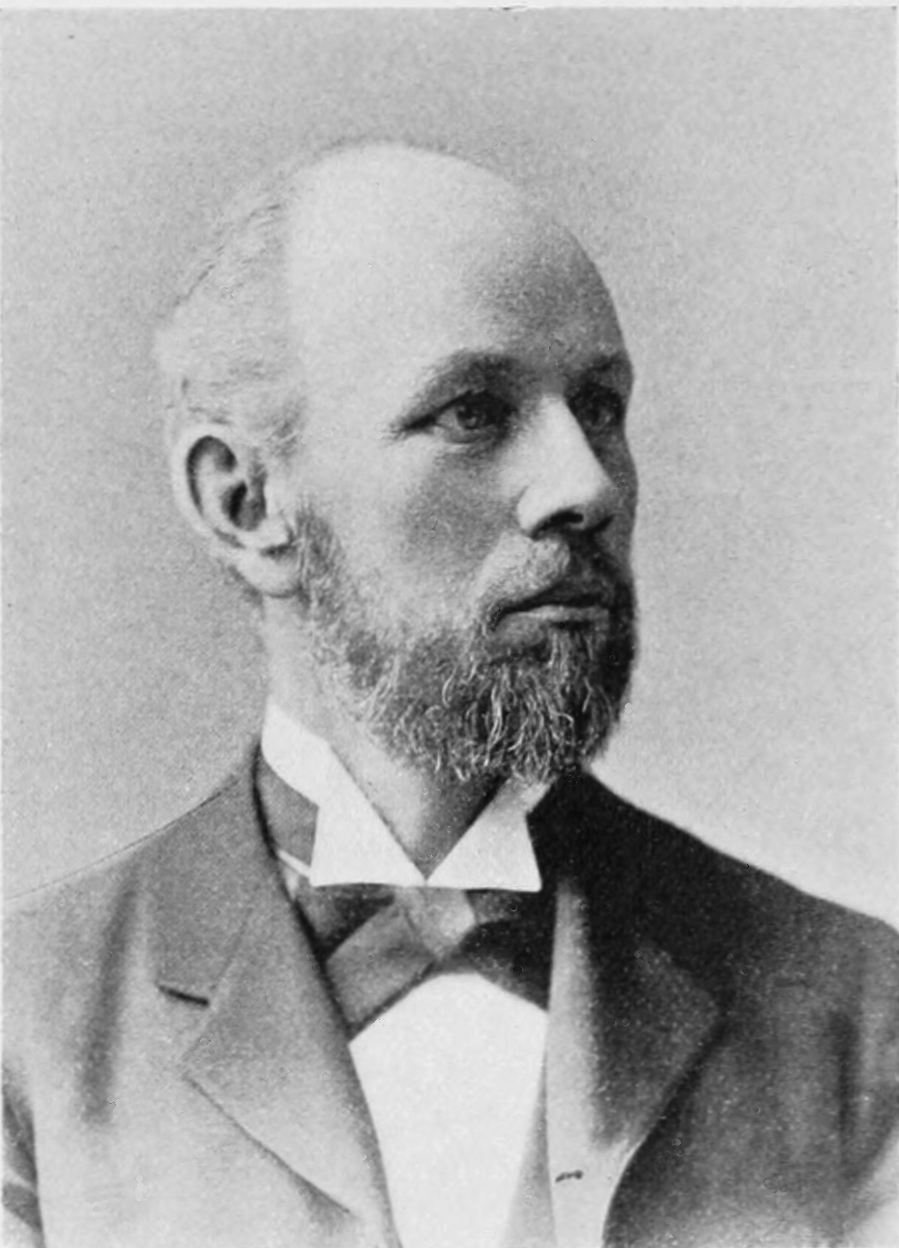
- William Otis Crosby, 1899
- Born: 14 January 1850; Decatur, United States
- Died: 31 December 1925 (aged 75); Boston, USA
- Education: Massachusetts Institute of Technology
- Spouse: Alice Ballard Crosby
- Awards: Bronze medal of the Exposition Universelle (1900)
- Scientific career
- Fields: Geology
- Workplaces: Massachusetts Institute of Technology (Boston)

William Otis Crosby (January 14, 1850, Decatur, Byrd Township, Brown County, Ohio - 31 December 1925, Boston) was an American geologist and engineer. Crosby was a professor at the Massachusetts Institute of Technology (1906), as well a member of the American Academy of Arts and Sciences (1881).

== Biography ==
Crosby graduated from the Massachusetts Institute of Technology with a bachelor's degree in 1876. In 1875, while still a student, he was an assistant in geology and mineralogy in the Boston Society of Natural History, where he worked under the guidance of the paleontologist Alpheus Hyatt.

After graduating from the Massachusetts Institute of Technology, he was appointed instructor at the same institute in the Department of Geology (1878-1883). In 1881 he was elected a member of the American Academy of Arts and Sciences in Cambridge, Massachusetts.

In 1883 he received the post of assistant and held this post until 1902. Then he worked as an assistant professor (1902-1906) and professor of mineralogy and lithology until 1907, when progressive deafness led him to resign. For his final year in post (1906-1907), Crosby was also head of the Department of Geology.

After the termination of teaching activity, he worked as an expert consultant on the construction of engineering structures. He died in Boston on December 31, 1925.

== Scientific and engineering activities ==
Teaching at the Institute was combined with extensive scientific and engineering activities. The research covered such areas as mineralogy, igneous rocks, glaciology, physical geography, metamorphism, economic geology, fracture disturbance and tectonics, coral reefs, engineering geology and groundwater.

He gave one of the first classifications of fractured disturbance of rock massifs (1882).

He advised projects in the United States, Alaska, Mexico and Spain. Among them such as Catskill Aqueduct, Muscle Shoals, Alabama, Arrowrock Dam, La Boquilla Dam in Chihuahua (Mexico) and others.

== Awards and recognition ==
- Member of the American Academy of Arts and Sciences (1881)
- Member of the Geological Society of America
- Member of the Seismological Society of America
- Member of the American Institute of Mining, Metallurgical, and Petroleum Engineers
- Member of the Boston Society of Natural History
- The Walker Award (2x) from the Boston Society of Natural History
- Bronze medal of the Exposition Universelle (1900)

== Personal life ==
Crosby married Alice Ballard on September 4, 1876. They had a son, Irwin Ballard Crosby, born in 1891, who later graduated from MIT, and became an engineering geologist.

== Hetty Orrilla Ballard ==
Crosby was an uncle to Hetty Orrilla Ballard (1868-1897), who lived with Crosby's family for a number of years. Ballard was the only woman to graduate in geology from MIT in 1893, and worked for a while 'so long as her health would permit', as assistant in paleontology at the museum of the Boston Society of Natural History. Ballard died in Colorado Springs in 1897.

== Bibliography ==
- W. O. Crosby Native Bitumens and the Pitch Lake of Trinidad. - The American Naturalist, 1879, Vol. 13, No. 4 (Apr., 1879), pp. 229–246
- W. O. Crosby Common Minerals and Rocks. - Boston Society Natural History, Guides for Science Teaching, No. XII. - Boston, Heath & Co., First edition: 1881. - 205 p.
- Crosby, W. O., 1882, On the classification and origin of joint structures, Proc. Boston Society Natural History, 1882-1883, v. 22, pp. 72-85. - Boston: Printed for the Society 1884.
- W. O. Crosby, I. B. Crosby Keystone faults. Bulletin of the Geological Society of America, 1925, volume 36, pages 623-640.
