= Sutton House =

Sutton House may refer to:

in England

- Sutton House, London, a Grade II* listed Tudor manor house on Homerton High Street in the London Borough of Hackney

in Ireland

- Sutton Castle, a listed Tudor-revival mansion previously owned by Andrew Jameson

in New Zealand

- Sutton House (Christchurch), a Category I listed house in Christchurch formerly owned by artist Bill Sutton

in the United States (by state)

- Sutton House (St. Georges, Delaware)
- Thomas Sutton House, Woodland Beach, Delaware
- Warren Sutton House, Edison, Georgia
- John Sutton House, Paris, Idaho
- Warner P. Sutton House, Saugatuck, Michigan
- Nathan Esek and Sarah Emergene Sutton House, Washtenaw County, Michigan
- Sutton-Chapman-Howland House, Newark Valley, New York
- Sutton House (Manhattan), New York, New York
- Sutton-Newby House, Hertford, North Carolina
- Sutton House (Decatur, Ohio), listed on the National Register of Historic Places (NRHP)
- Sutton-Ditz House, Clarion, Pennsylvania
- John Sutton Hall, Indiana, Pennsylvania
- Ephraim D. and William D. Sutton House, Park City, Utah, listed on the NRHP
- Harvey P. Sutton House, McCook, Nebraska

== See also ==
- Sutton Block
- Sutton Farm
- Sutton Barn
