= Senator Vance =

Senator Vance may refer to:

== Members of the United States Senate ==
- JD Vance (born 1984), U.S. Senator from Ohio
- Zebulon Baird Vance (1830–1894), U.S. Senator from North Carolina

== United States state senate members ==
- Calvin B. Vance (1842–1926), Mississippi State Senate
- Elijah Vance (1801–1871), Ohio State Senate
- Gordon Vance (1951–2024), Montana State Senate
- Joseph Vance (Ohio politician) (1786–1852), Ohio State Senate
- Pat Vance (born 1936), Pennsylvania State Senate
- Ralph Vance (1869–1954), Nebraska State Senate
- Shelley Vance (fl. 2020s), Montana State Senate
- William R. Vance (1806–1885), Kentucky State Senate
- William Washington Vance (1849–1900), Louisiana State Senate
