= Eagle Creek Covered Bridge =

- U.S. National Register of Historic Places
- Location: 3 mi (4.8 km) south of Decatur, Ohio on State Route 763
- Coordinates: 38°46′11″N 83°42′54″W
- Area: less than one acre
- Built: 1875
- Built by: Smith Bridge Co.; Rees, Samuel
- Architectural style: Smith Truss Covered Bridge
- NRHP reference No.: 75001324
- Added to NRHP: December 6, 1975

The Eagle Creek Covered Bridge, in Byrd Township near Decatur, Ohio, was a historic Smith truss covered bridge built in 1875. Also known as the Bowman Bridge, it was listed on the National Register of Historic Places in 1975.

Before its destruction it was the longest single-span covered bridge in Ohio. It was one of only 15 Smith truss bridges then surviving in the state, this like most others built by the Smith Bridge Co.

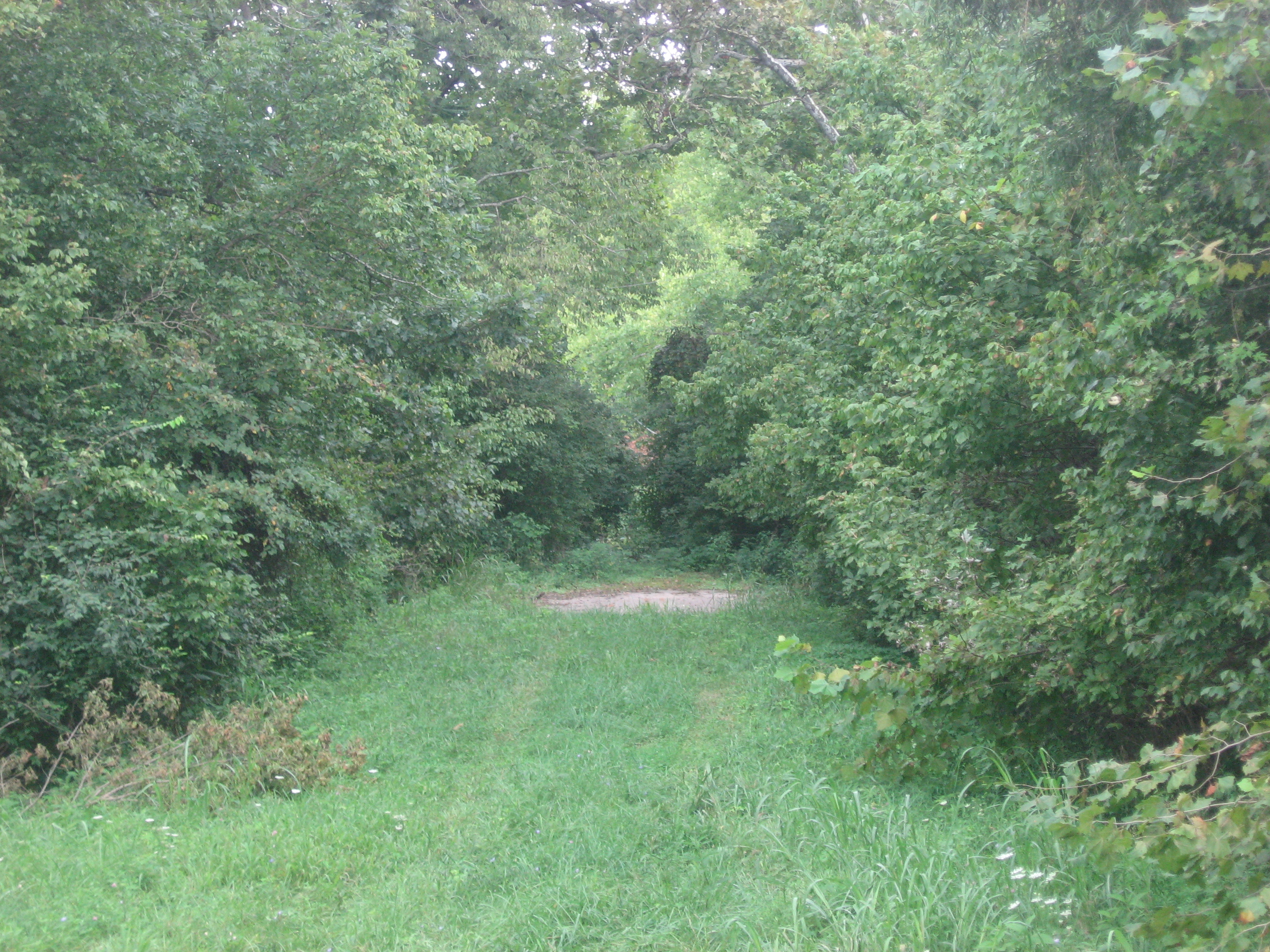
Site of bridge

It was washed away in 1997.
