= Brown County Courthouse (Ohio) =

Local government building in the United States

- U.S. Historic district – Contributing property
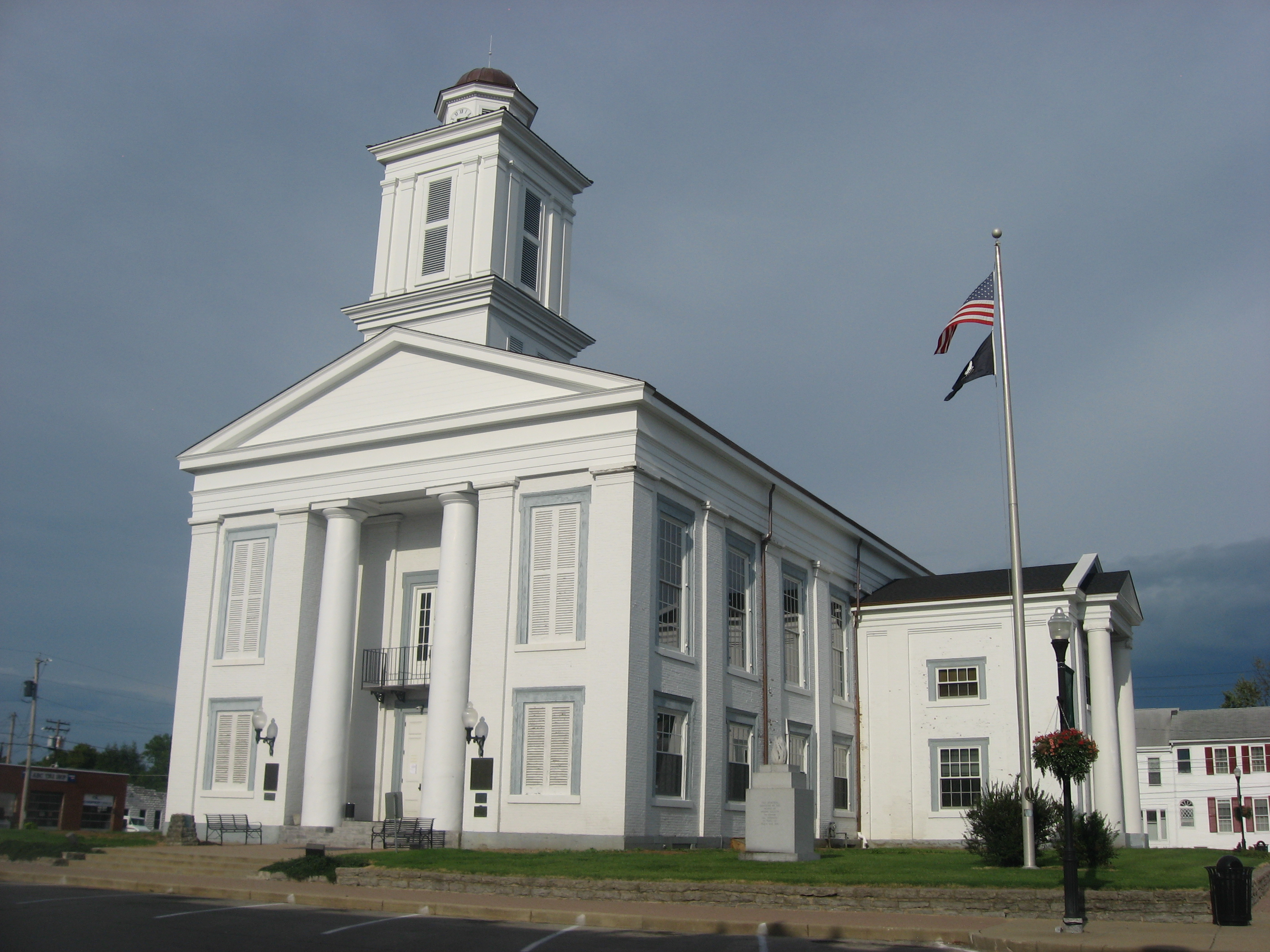
- The Brown County Courthouse in Georgetown, Ohio

- Location within Ohio Location within the United States
- Location: 101 South Main Street Georgetown, Ohio
- Coordinates: 38°51′56″N 83°54′14″W
- Built: 1851
- Architect: Hubbard Baker
- Architectural style: Greek Revival
- Part of: Georgetown Historic District (ID78002011)
- Added to NRHP: March 17, 1994

The Brown County Courthouse is located at 101 South Main Street in Georgetown, Ohio. The courthouse is the centerpiece of Georgetown and is included in the Georgetown Historic District.

== History ==
Brown County was formed in 1818, and the county seat was placed in Ripley. A courthouse was started in 1821, but the county seat was moved to Bridgewater and then to Georgetown. The courthouse was constructed in 1823 and was a simple square structure made of red brick with a hipped roof. This courthouse was soon decided to be too small for the population, and the county selected a plan from Hubbard Baker in March 1849.

The building is a fine representation of Greek Revival architecture and was completed in 1851. Wings extending from the courthouse were added in 1914 for extra room. A fire started by an arsonist swept through the courthouse in 1977 and was determined to be started in the northern stairwell and the judge's chambers. Nobody has ever been accused or convicted of the crime. The county was placed with the decision to tear down the burnt husk and start anew or to repair the structure.

After a vote, the county decided to restore the structure to its pre-fire condition. Local citizens banded together to form the Brown County Courthouse Reconstruction Association to help repair the building. The courthouse was re-dedicated in 1982 to much ceremony.

== Exterior ==
The courthouse is built of bricks painted white and has blue windows and door trim. The windows are shuttered on both levels; a balcony is attached above the door and is accessed by a set of French Doors. The entrance from the square is recessed and framed by two large Doric columns, and Doric pilasters are found along the building's walls.

The roof above the entrance resembles a pediment but is actually a gable. The two wings also contain entrances, but the door is not recessed like the main entrance. Two stacked rectangular drums protrude from the center of the building, with an octagon drum supporting the dome. A four-faced clock protrudes from the sides of the final drum.

== Grounds ==
The courthouse rests in a town square bounded by Grant Street, Apple Street, Cherry Street, and Main Street. The site in front of the courthouse saw Morgan's Raiders enter town in 1863. The band gathered in front of the courthouse and hitched their horses for their short stay. There was no skirmish, but a soldier on leave was shot, and several horses and valuables went missing.
