= Grant Schoolhouse =

School in Ohio, United States

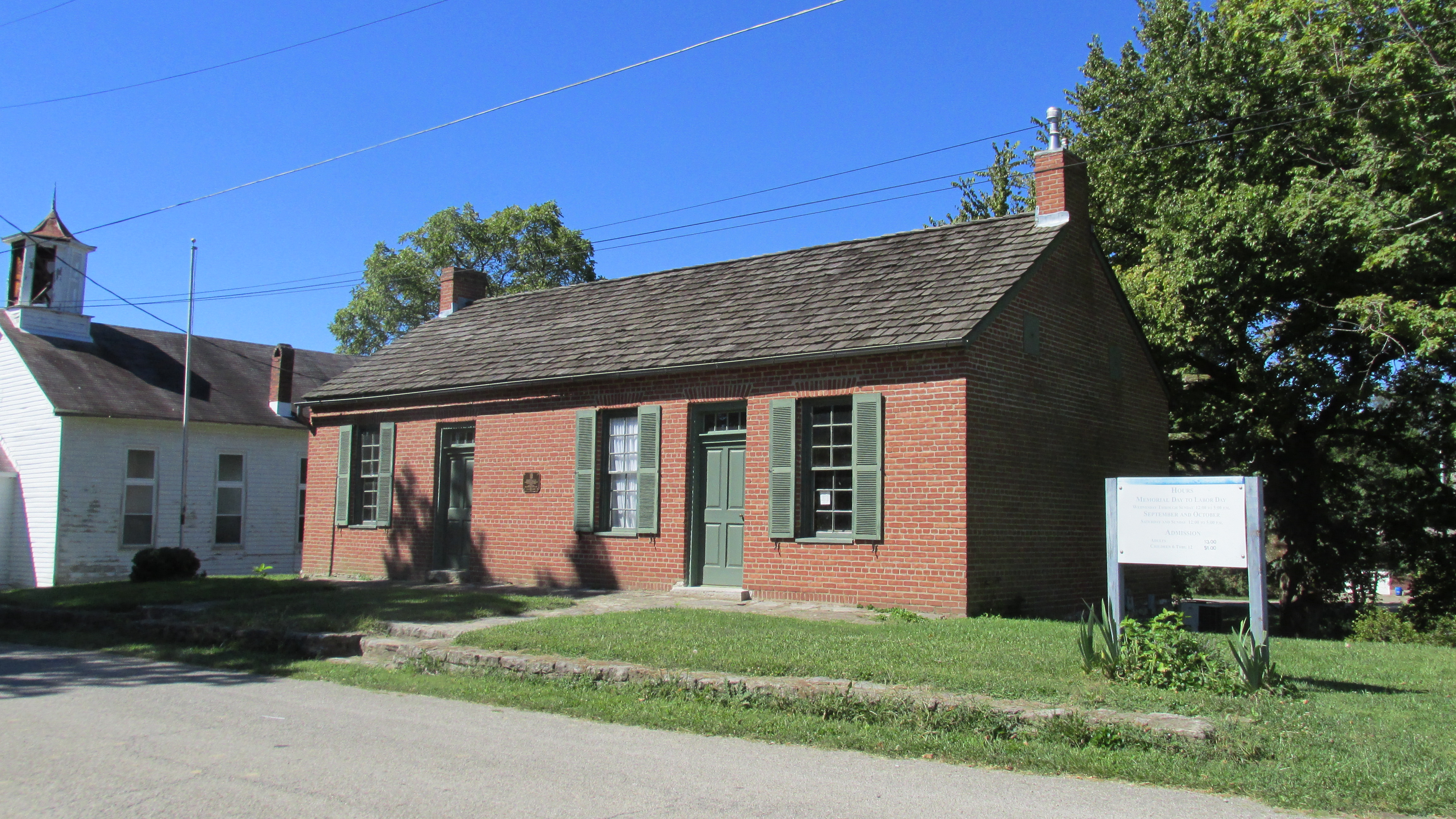
Grant Schoolhouse

The Grant Schoolhouse in Georgetown, Ohio, was the school where Ulysses S. Grant attended from 1829 to 1835. Some of the furnishings in the school are from the period when Grant went to school there. The school is located at 508 S. Water St., Georgetown, Ohio 45121 and owned by the Ohio History Connection.
