= Thompson Farm (Georgetown, Ohio) =

- U.S. National Register of Historic Places
- Location within Ohio
- Location: West of Georgetown, Ohio off State Route 221
- Coordinates: 38°51′58″N 83°55′23″W
- Area: less than one acre
- Built: c.1840
- Built by: Baker, Emmet Hubbard
- Architectural style: Federal
- NRHP reference No.: 76001375
- Added to NRHP: January 1, 1976

The Thompson Farm, in Pleasant Township near Georgetown, Ohio, was listed on the National Register of Historic Places in 1976. The listing included three contributing buildings. It has also been known as Armleder Farm.

It includes a farmhouse with Federal-style architecture, plus an original log house and smoke house.

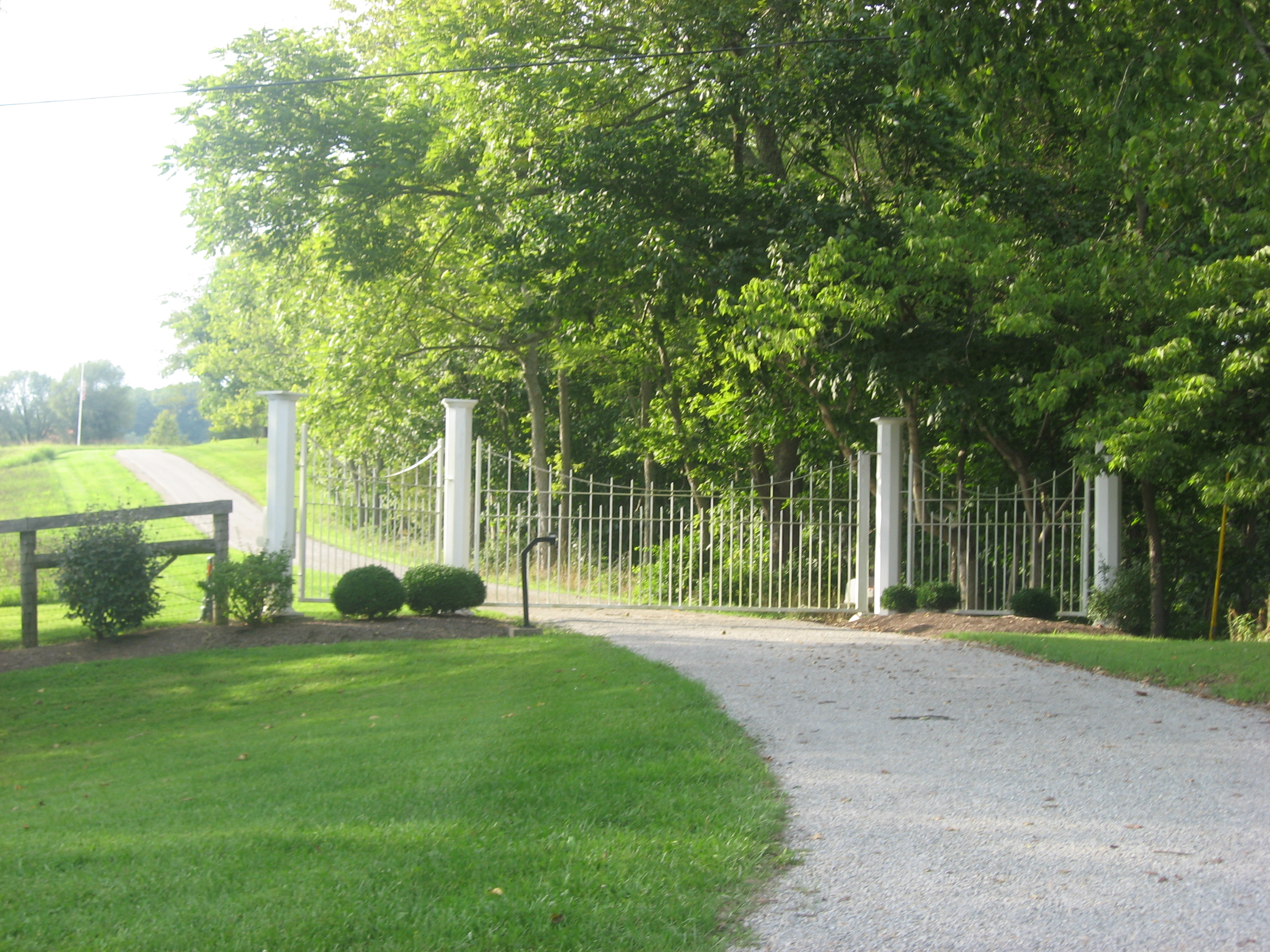
Gate at the farm, not a contributing structure.
