= Sutton House (Decatur, Ohio) =

- U.S. National Register of Historic Places
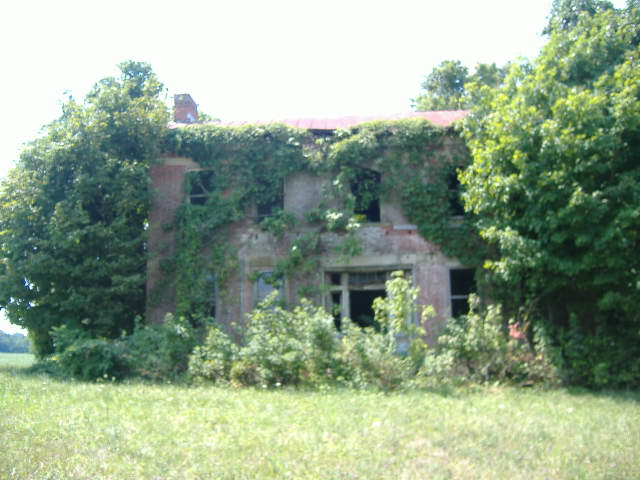
- The Sutton House in a dilapidated state.

- Location within Ohio
- Location: .3 miles (0.48 km) east of Decatur, Ohio on State Route 125 Decatur, Ohio
- Coordinates: 38°48′49″N 83°41′54″W
- Area: 1 acre (0.40 ha)
- Built: c.1840
- Built by: Sutton, Otho
- Architectural style: Federal
- NRHP reference No.: 77001043
- Added to NRHP: March 25, 1977

The Sutton House, in Byrd Township, Ohio near Decatur, Ohio, was a historic house built around 1840. Also known as Wilke House, it was listed on the National Register of Historic Places in 1977.

It was deemed to be one of the finest examples of stone farmhouses in southern Ohio from the early 19th century. The house notably had stone beltcourses running all the way across the front façade. It had a fine front doorway, with a paneled door flanked by paired fluted Federal-style columns.

It was built by Otho Sutton, son of Benjamin Sutton, early settler in the area who was a Revolutionary War soldier and who served as a judge for 25 years.

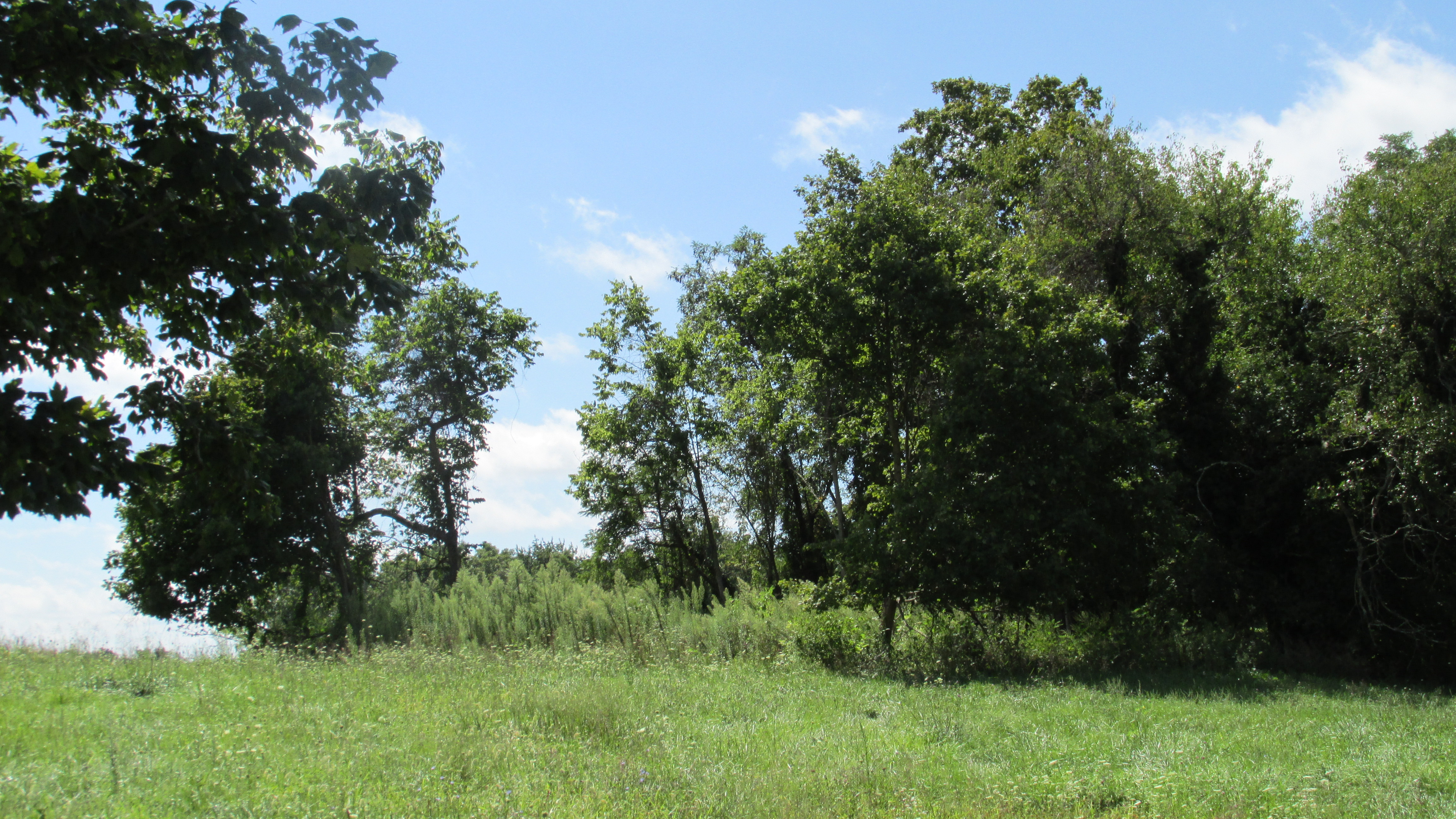
A photo in 2013, not of the house, but perhaps on its site

The house has been destroyed.
