= Brown County Airport =

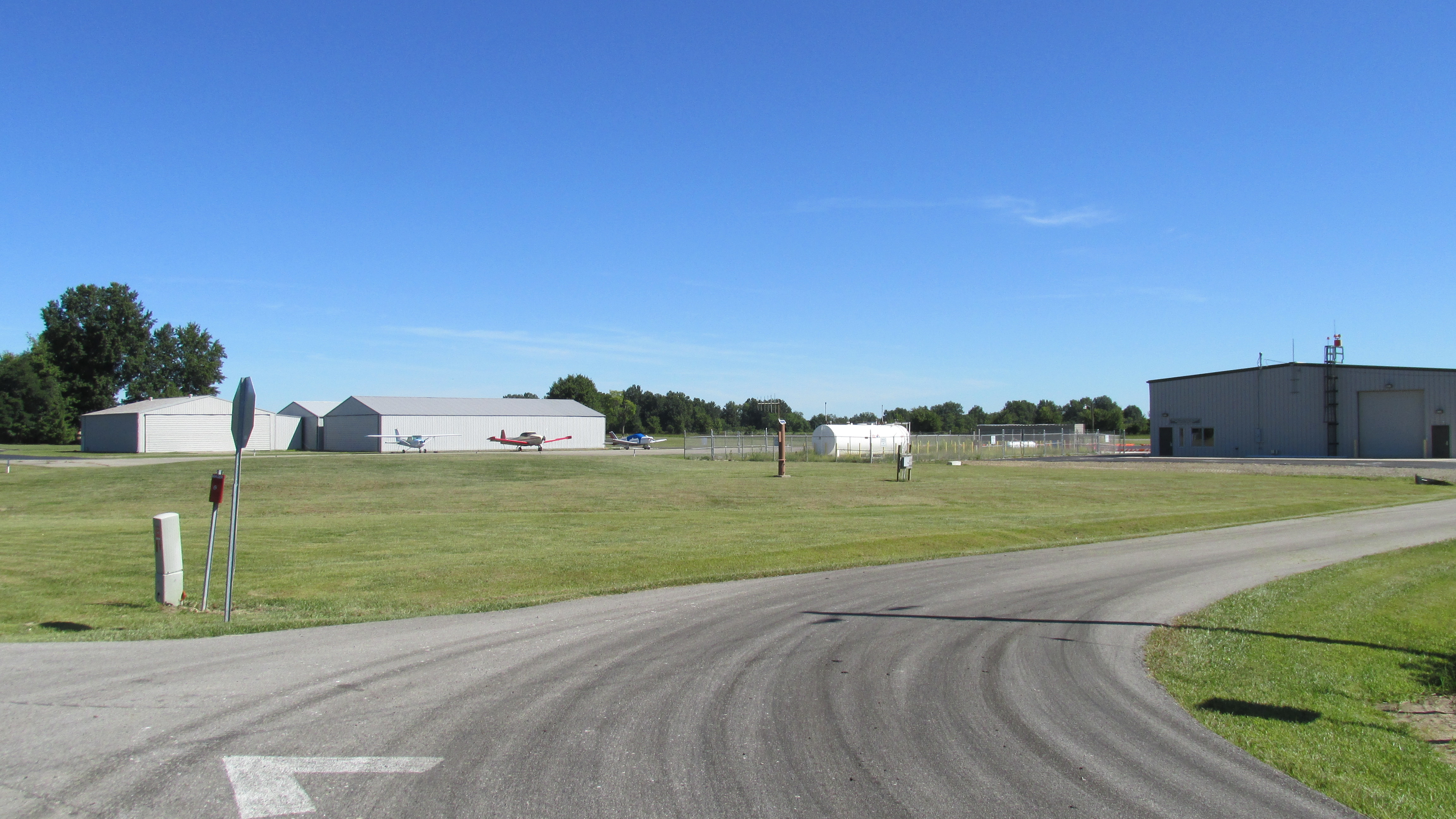
- IATA: none; ICAO: KGEO; FAA LID: GEO

Summary
- Airport type: Public
- Owner: Brown County Commissioners
- Serves: Georgetown, Ohio
- Elevation AMSL: 958 ft (292 m)
- Coordinates: 38°52′55″N 083°52′57″W

Map
- Location within Ohio Location within the United States

Runways
Direction	Length		Surface
Direction	ft	m	Surface
18/36	3,530	1,076	Asphalt

Statistics (2022)
- Aircraft operations: 8,030
- Based aircraft: 9
- Source: Federal Aviation Administration

Brown County Airport (ICAO: KGEO, FAA LID: GEO) (Note: The airport formerly used the FAA location identifier I63.) is a mile north of Georgetown, in Brown County, Ohio.

Many U.S. airports use the same three-letter location identifier for the FAA and IATA, but this airport is GEO to the FAA and has no IATA code. (IATA assigned GEO to Cheddi Jagan International Airport in Timehri, Guyana).

== History ==
The airport was built on 40 acres (16 ha) of land purchased from a local businessman named Forrest Wahl. Construction was temporarily halted in early November 1968 due to poor soil conditions. The airport was dedicated on 19 October 1969.

== Facilities ==
The airport covers 42 acres (17 ha) at an elevation of 958 feet (292 m). Its single runway, 18/36, is 3,530 by 65 feet (1,076 x 20 m) asphalt.

The airport has a fixed-base operator with fuel and limited amenities.

In the year ending June 23, 2023, the airport had 8,030 aircraft operations, average about 22 per day: 95% general aviation, 4% air taxi and 1% military. 9 aircraft were then based at this airport, all single-engine airplanes.

== Accidents and incidents ==
- On 25 October 1989, a Piper Warrior was destroyed by fire while undergoing maintenance at the airport.
- On 12 June 1994, a gyrocopter crashed near the airport, killing the pilot.

== See also ==
- List of airports in Ohio
