= Henry Martin Farm =

- U.S. National Register of Historic Places
- Location within Ohio
- Location: 2 miles (3.2 km)north of Ripley, Ohio on U.S. Route 68
- Coordinates: 38°46′43″N 83°51′24″W
- Area: 1 acre (0.40 ha)
- Built: 1840
- Built by: Martin, Henry
- NRHP reference No.: 75001326
- Added to NRHP: August 15, 1975

The Henry Martin Farm, near Ripley, Ohio, is a historic farm which was listed on the National Register of Historic Places in 1975.

The land was purchased in 1798 by Alexander Martin, an American Revolutionary War veteran. He built a log cabin first, and in 1816 built "Stonehurst", a stone house. Two barns built by his son Henry Martin are close by. The property had not left the Martin family up to 1999.

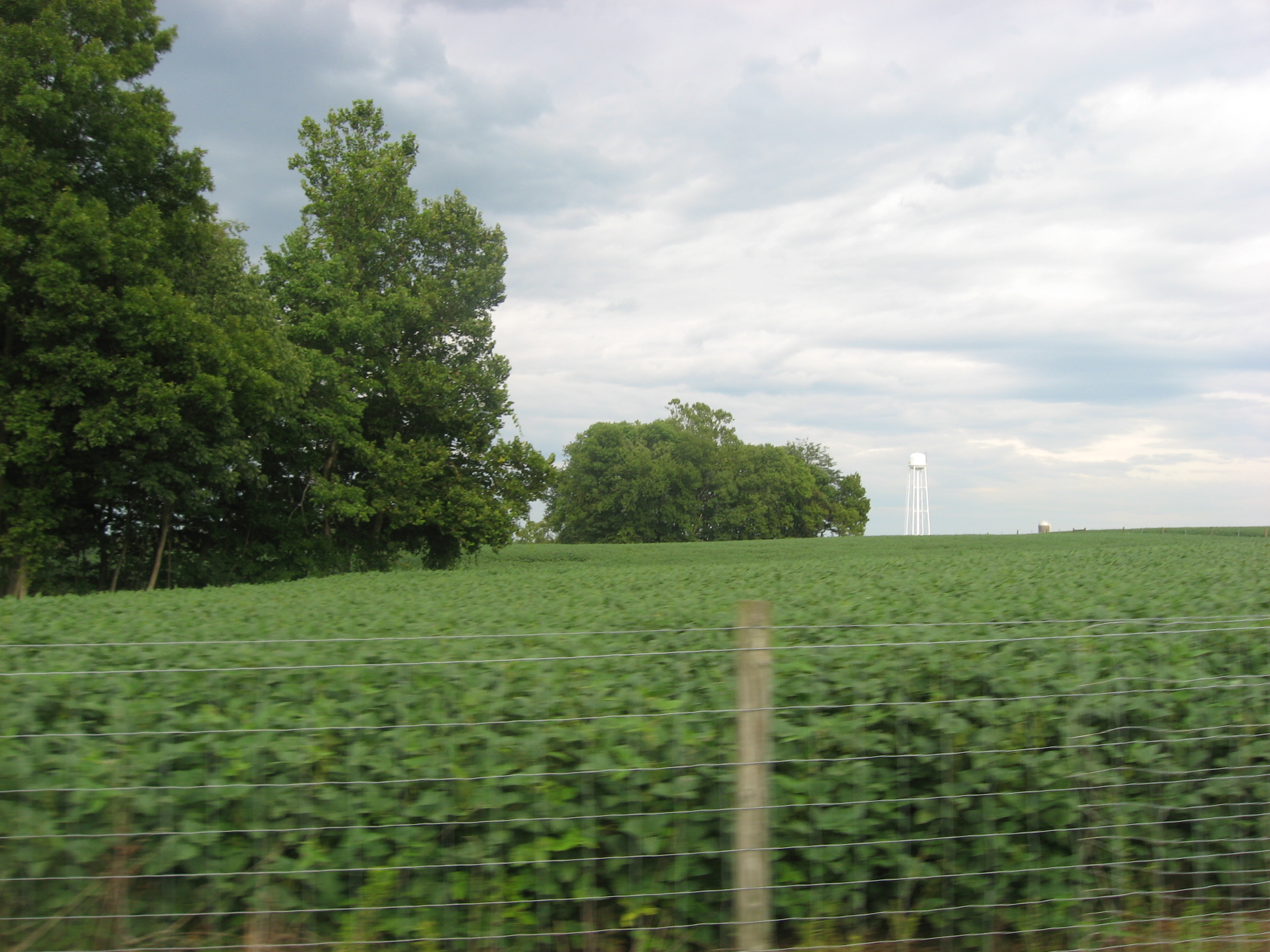
Photo of some farm land, but not of the listed area with the three contributing buildings
