= Bailey–Thompson House =

Historic house in Ohio, United States

- U.S. National Register of Historic Places
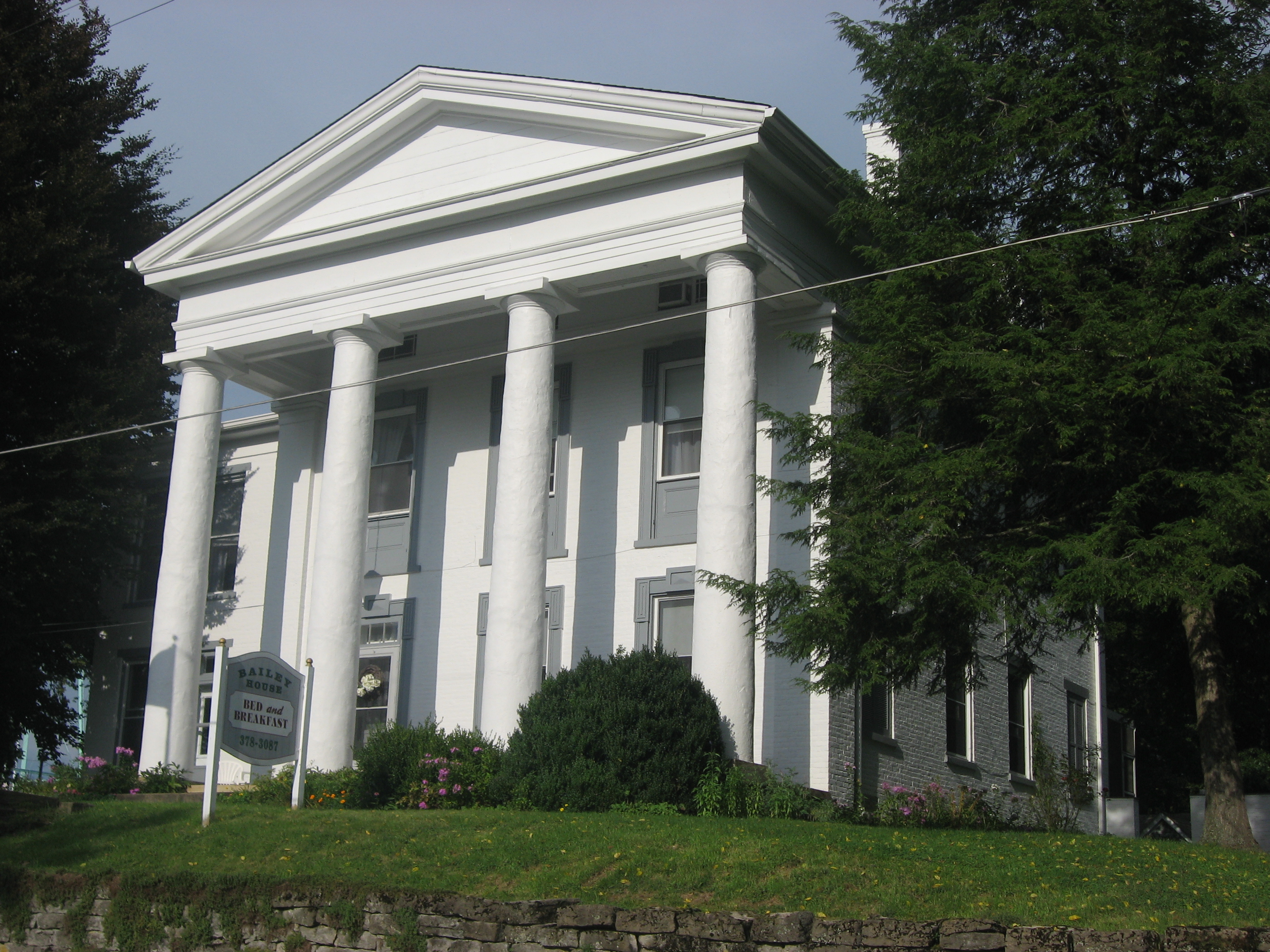
- Front and southern side

- Location within Ohio Location within the United States
- Location: 112 N. Water St., Georgetown, Ohio
- Coordinates: 38°51′57.73″N 83°54′6.28″W
- Architect: E. Hubbard Baker
- Architectural style: Greek Revival
- NRHP reference No.: 76001373
- Added to NRHP: 1976-11-07

The Bailey–Thompson House is a registered historic building in Georgetown, Ohio, listed in the National Register on 1976-11-07.

== Historic uses ==
- Single Dwelling
