= Ralph Vance =

American politician (1869–1954)

Member of the Nebraska State Senate from the 26th district
- In office January 6, 1925 – January 3, 1933
- Preceded by: Erick Johnson
- Succeeded by: Cloyd Stewart

Member of the Nebraska House of Representatives
- In office January 7, 1919 – January 6, 1925 Serving with C. I. Van Patten (1919–1921), J. C. Gilmore (1921–1923)
- Preceded by: Erick Johnson; Fred Johnson
- Succeeded by: J. C. Lee
- Constituency: 47th district (1919–1923); 69th district (1923–1925)

Personal details
- Born: 1869 Ripley, Ohio
- Died: April 14, 1954 (aged 84) Hastings, Nebraska
- Party: Republican
- Spouse: Anna V. Frisch (m. 1905)
- Children: 2
- Occupation: Farmer, banker, businessman

Ralph R. Vance (1869 – April 14, 1954) was a Republican politician from Nebraska who served as a member of the Nebraska House of Representatives from 1919 to 1925 and in the Nebraska State Senate from 1925 to 1933.

Vance was born in Ripley, Ohio, in 1869, and moved to Nebraska in 1887. He first settled in Clay County, where he raised Duroc pigs. He moved to Adams County in 1901.

Along with C. I. Van Patten, Vance was one of two members elected to the Nebraska House of Representatives in 1918 from the 47th district. He was re-elected in 1920 with J. C. Gilmore. In 1922, following the creation of single-member districts, Vance was re-elected in the 69th district. He was elected to the Nebraska State Senate in 1924, and was re-elected in 1926, 1928, and 1930. In 1932, Vance was defeated for re-election by Cloyd Stewart.

Vance died on April 13, 1954.
