= Aberdeen Mound =

Archaeological site in Ohio, United States

- U.S. National Register of Historic Places
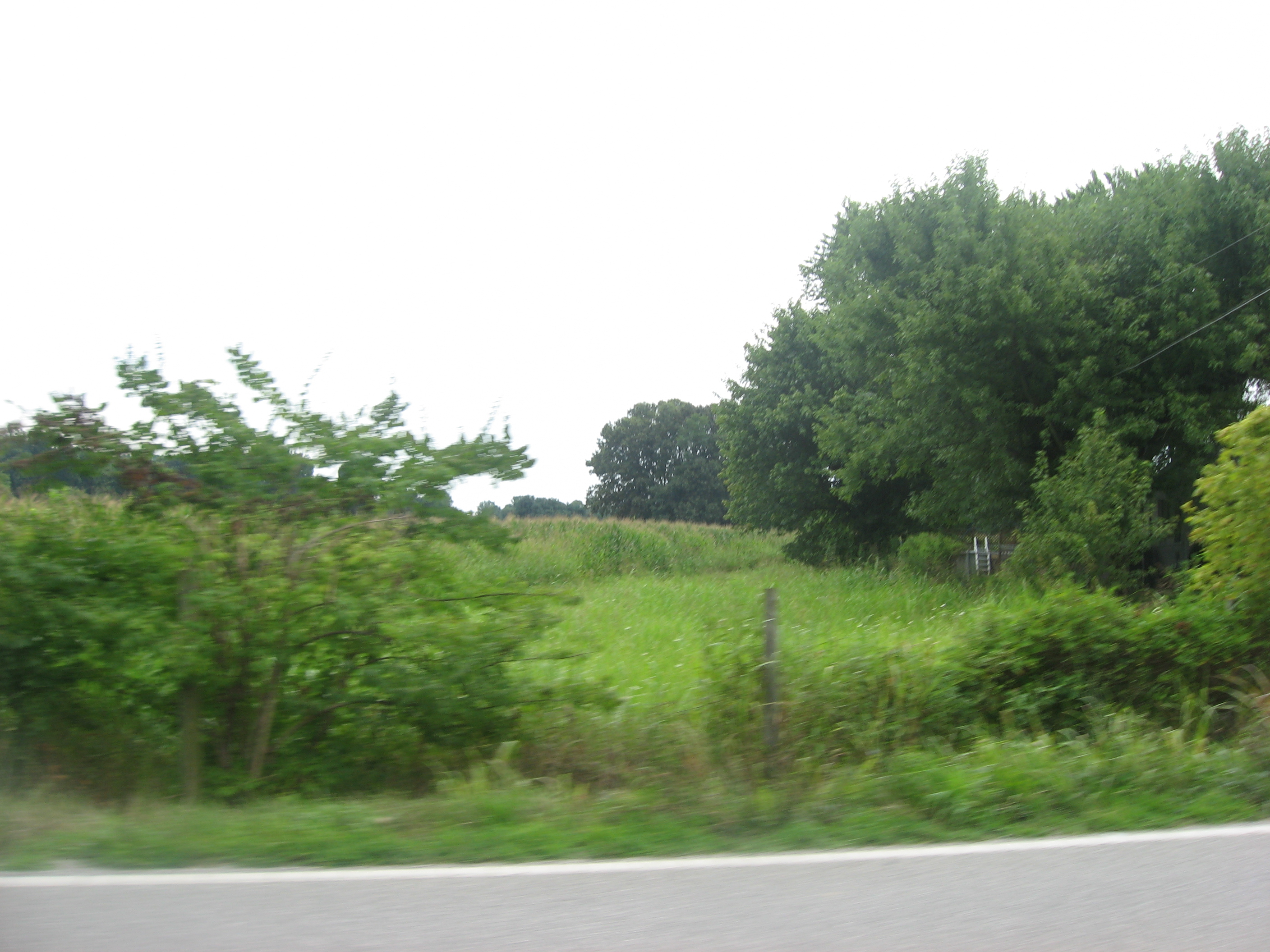
- Seen from a distance to the east

- Location within Ohio Location within the United States
- Location: Western side of State Route 41, north of Aberdeen
- Nearest city: Aberdeen, Ohio
- Coordinates: 38°40′4″N 83°45′47″W
- NRHP reference No.: 74001401
- Added to NRHP: July 15, 1974

The Aberdeen Mound is a historic site in Aberdeen, Ohio, United States. Located north of the village off State Route 41, it was listed on the National Register of Historic Places in 1974.

== Historic uses ==
- Graves/Burials

== See also ==
- List of burial mounds in the United States
