= Union Township, Brown County, Ohio =

Township in Ohio, US

- Township
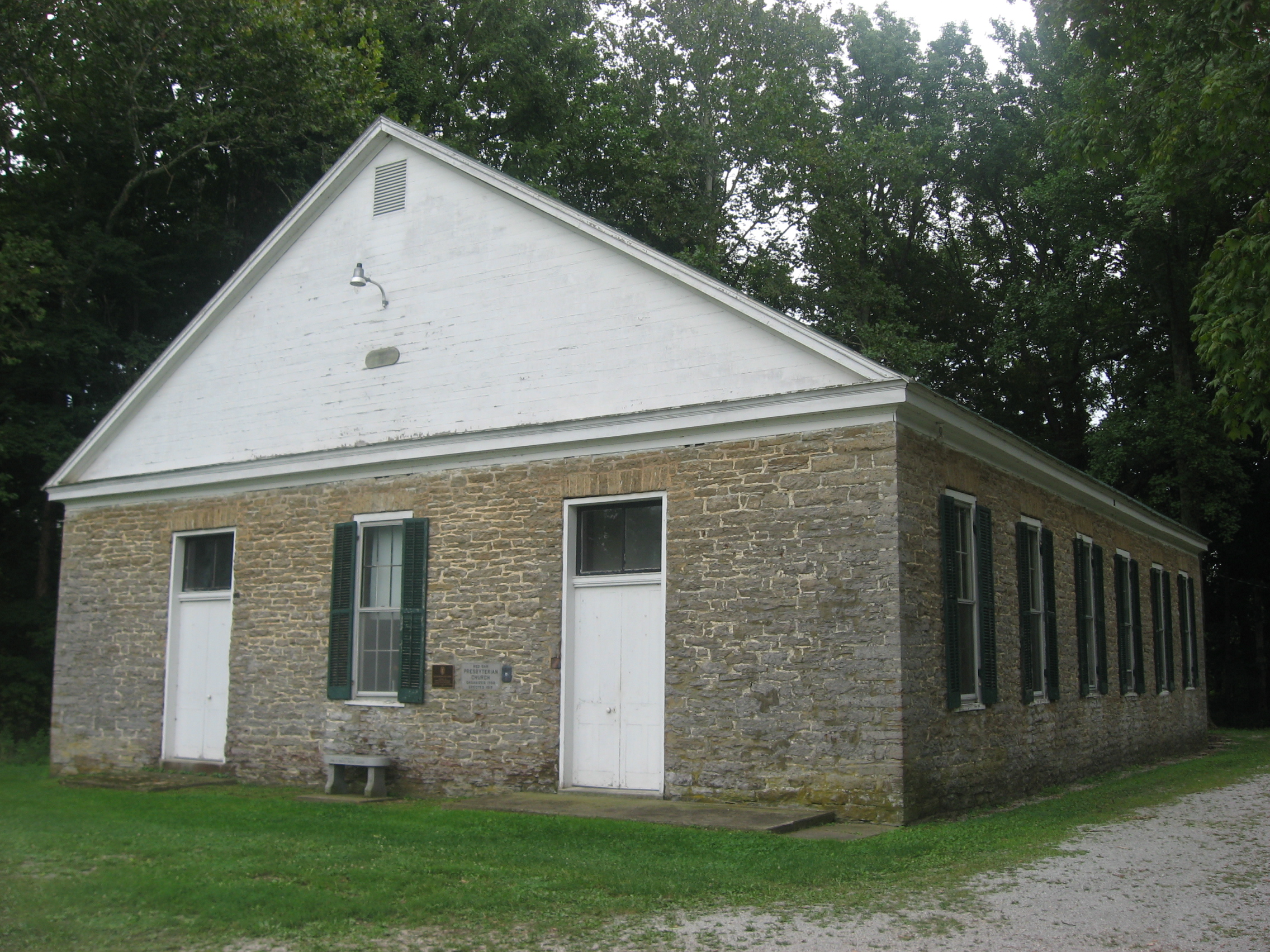
- Red Oak Presbyterian Church, built 1817

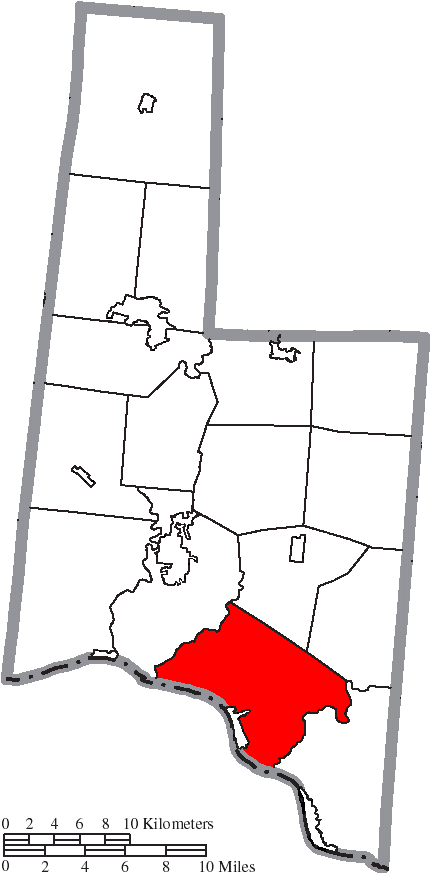
- Location of Union Township in Brown County
- Coordinates: 38°45′0″N 83°49′46″W
- Country: United States
- State: Ohio
- County: Brown

Area
  - Total: 38.6 sq mi (100.1 km^{2})
  - Land: 38.0 sq mi (98.4 km^{2})
  - Water: 0.69 sq mi (1.8 km^{2})
- Elevation: 560 ft (170 m)

Population (2020)
  - Total: 2,739
  - Density: 72.1/sq mi (27.8/km^{2})
- Time zone: UTC-5 (Eastern (EST))
  - Summer (DST): UTC-4 (EDT)
- FIPS code: 39-78232
- GNIS feature ID: 1085806

Union Township is one of the sixteen townships of Brown County, Ohio, United States. The 2020 census found 2,739 people in the township.

== Geography ==
Located in the southern part of the county along the Ohio River, it borders the following townships:

- Byrd Township - northeast
- Huntington Township - southeast
- Jefferson Township - north
- Pleasant Township - northwest

Kentucky lies across the Ohio River to the southwest: Mason County to the south, and Bracken County to the west.

The village of Ripley is located in southwestern Union Township, along the Ohio River.

== Name and history ==
It is one of twenty-seven Union Townships statewide.

In 1833, Union Township contained six gristmills and eight saw mills.

== Government ==
The township is governed by a three-member board of trustees, who are elected in November of odd-numbered years to a four-year term beginning on the following January 1. Two are elected in the year after the presidential election and one is elected in the year before it. There is also an elected township fiscal officer, who serves a four-year term beginning on April 1 of the year after the election, which is held in November of the year before the presidential election. Vacancies in the fiscal officership or on the board of trustees are filled by the remaining trustees.
