= Grant Boyhood Home =

Historic house in Ohio, United States

- U.S. Grant Boyhood Home
- U.S. National Register of Historic Places
- U.S. National Historic Landmark
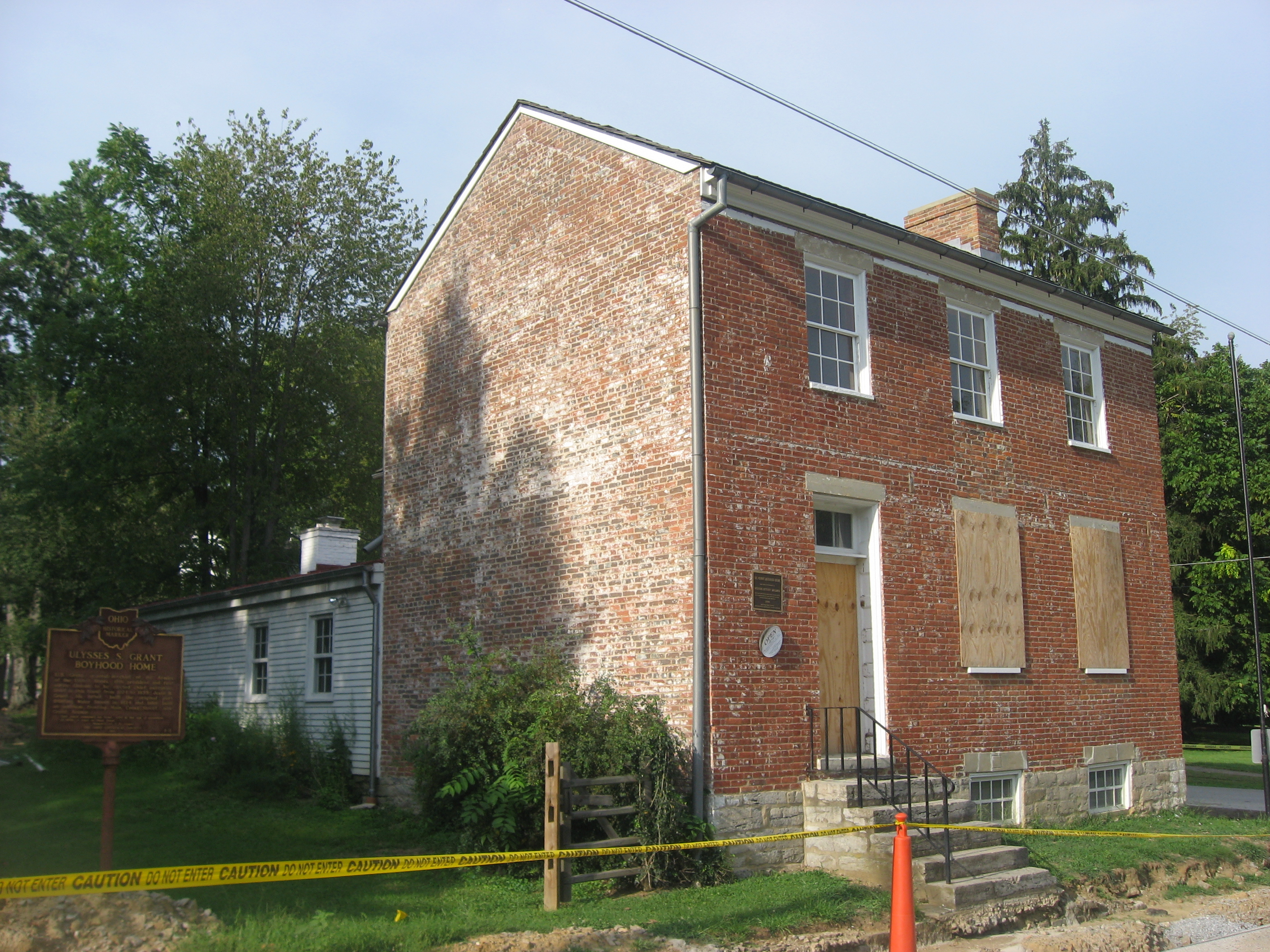
- Ulysses S. Grant Boyhood Home

- Location within Ohio Location within the United States
- Interactive map showing the location of Grant Boyhood Home
- Location: 219 East Grant Avenue; Georgetown, Ohio
- Coordinates: 38°51′58″N 83°54′8″W
- Area: less than one acre
- Built: 1823
- Architect: Jesse Grant
- NRHP reference No.: 76001374

Significant dates
- Added to NRHP: October 8, 1976
- Designated NHL: February 4, 1985

The Grant Boyhood Home is a historic house museum at 219 East Grant Avenue in Georgetown, Ohio. Built in 1823, it was where United States President and American Civil War General Ulysses S. Grant (1822–85) lived from 1823 until 1839, when he left for the United States Military Academy at West Point. In 1976, the house was listed on the National Register of Historic Places. Nine years later, it was designated a National Historic Landmark. It is now owned by the Ohio History Connection and operated as part of a suite of Grant-related museum properties in Georgetown.

== Description and history ==
The Grant Boyhood Home is located northeast of the center of Georgetown, at the northwest corner of East Grant Avenue and North Water Street. It is a 2 1/2-story brick house, with a side-gable roof and a three-bay front facade. The original exterior wall construction is approximately one foot thick and consists of a double wythe of brick with lime and rubble infill set on a foundation of fieldstone rocks local to the site. The main entrance is in the leftmost bay, and all of the window and door openings are topped by stone lintels. A two-story brick ell extends to the rear, as do a pair of single-story wood frame ells; all of these are either 19th-century additions made by Jesse Grant, or are reconstructions. The interior of the house retains original flooring and woodwork.

The house, along with a number of its additions, was built in 1823 by Jesse and Hannah Grant, the parents of Ulysses S. Grant. The family moved into this house when Ulysses was 16 months old, and it is where he grew up. Grant left for West Point in 1839, but was a frequent visitor over the next few years, and this house is the home he lived in the longest. Grant is known to have spent substantial time at his father's tannery, located just across the street.

By the 1970s, the house had deteriorated in condition and was at threat of demolition. It was rescued from that fate, and the nonprofit US Grant Homestead Association was formed to restore and maintain it. The organization now runs the house, a schoolhouse attended by Grant, and the tannery building under the ownership of the Ohio History Connection.

== See also ==
- Grant Birthplace, Point Pleasant, Ohio
- Ulysses S. Grant National Historic Site, near St. Louis
- Ulysses S. Grant Home, Galena, Illinois
- Grant Cottage State Historic Site, Mt. McGregor, New York
- General Grant National Memorial (Grant's Tomb)
