= Georgetown Historic District (Georgetown, Ohio) =

Historic district in Ohio, United States

- U.S. National Register of Historic Places
- U.S. Historic district
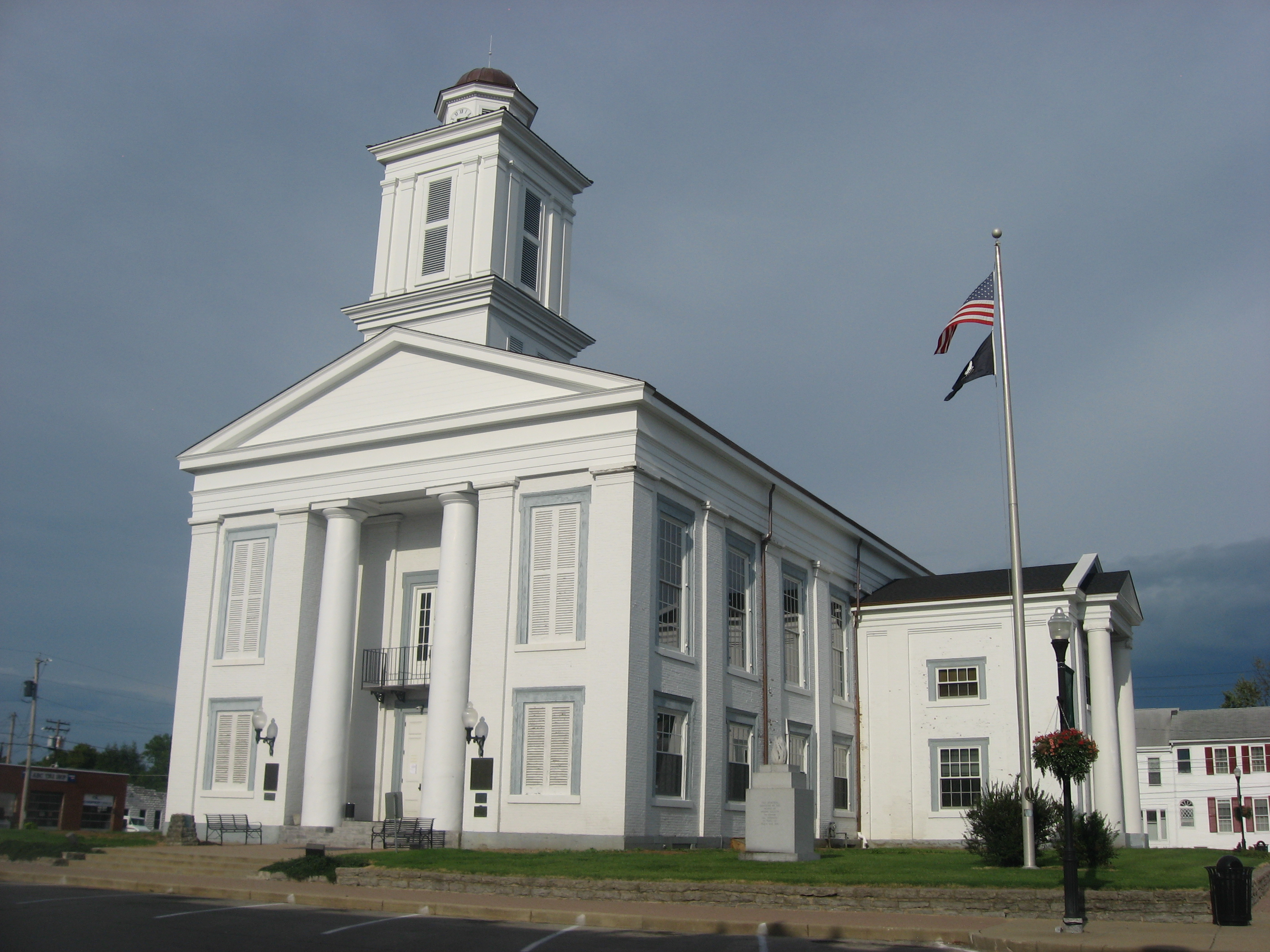
- Brown County Courthouse

- Location within Ohio Location within the United States
- Location: Roughly bounded by Water Alley, Pleasant, Short, and State Sts., Georgetown, Ohio
- Coordinates: 38°51′56″N 83°54′14″W
- Area: 17 acres (6.9 ha)
- Architect: multiple
- Architectural style: Mid 19th Century Revival, Late Victorian
- NRHP reference No.: 78002011
- Added to NRHP: May 23, 1978

The Georgetown Historic District in Georgetown, Ohio is a 17 acres (6.9 ha) historic district that was listed on the National Register of Historic Places in 1978. It includes 42 contributing buildings.

One contributing property in the district is the Brown County Courthouse.
