= Georgetown, Ohio =

- Village
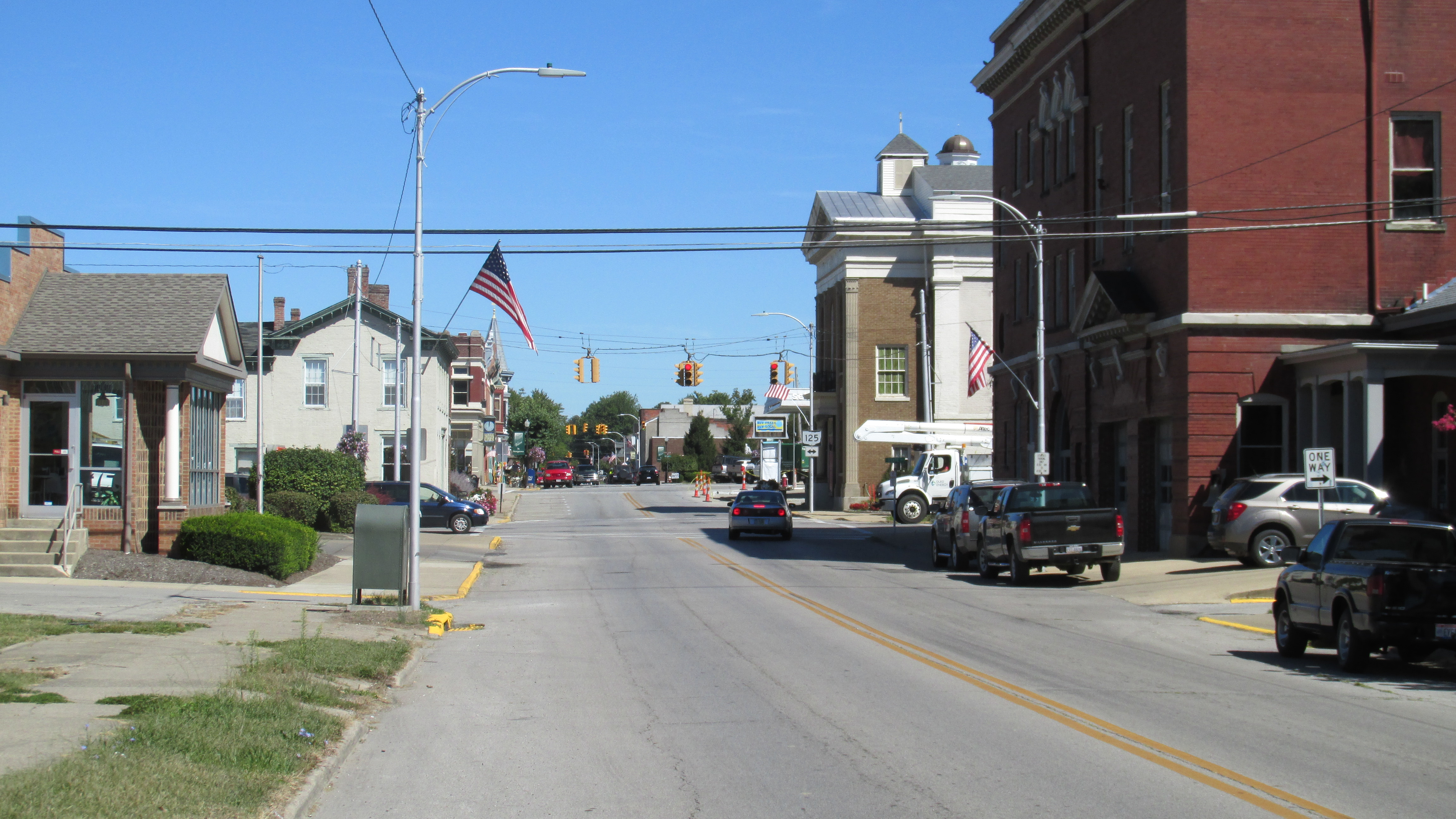
- Main Street

- Flag Seal
- Interactive map of Georgetown, Ohio
- Location within Ohio Location within the United States
- Coordinates: 38°52′30″N 83°53′50″W
- Country: United States
- State: Ohio
- County: Brown
- Townships: Pleasant, Franklin

Government
  - Mayor: Kelly Bolington
  - Village Administrator: Travis Dotson

Area
  - Total: 4.15 sq mi (10.76 km^{2})
  - Land: 4.15 sq mi (10.76 km^{2})
  - Water: 0 sq mi (0.00 km^{2})
- Elevation: 932 ft (284 m)

Population (2020)
  - Total: 4,453
  - Estimate (2023): 4,458
  - Density: 1,072.1/sq mi (413.93/km^{2})
- Time zone: UTC-5 (Eastern (EST))
  - Summer (DST): UTC-4 (EDT)
- ZIP code: 45121
- Area codes: 937, 326
- FIPS code: 39-29778
- GNIS feature ID: 2398952
- Website: georgetownohio.gov

Georgetown is a village in Brown County, Ohio, United States, and its county seat. The population was 4,453 at the 2020 census. Located about 36 miles (58 km) southeast of Cincinnati, Georgetown was the childhood home of U.S. President Ulysses S. Grant.

== History ==
Georgetown was platted in 1819. The village took its name from Georgetown, Kentucky. A post office called Georgetown has been in operation since 1821. Places in Georgetown on the National Register of Historic Places include the Bailey–Thompson House, Dr. Philip Buckner House and Barn, Georgetown Historic District and contributing Brown County Courthouse, Georgetown Public School, and the Grant Boyhood Home.

== Geography ==
According to the United States Census Bureau, the village has a total area of 4.04 square miles (10.46 km^{2}), all land.

== Demographics ==
Historical population
Census	Pop.	Note	%±
1850	618		—
1860	723		17.0%
1870	1,037		43.4%
1880	1,293		24.7%
1890	1,473		13.9%
1900	1,529		3.8%
1910	1,580		3.3%
1920	1,670		5.7%
1930	1,531		−8.3%
1940	1,848		20.7%
1950	2,200		19.0%
1960	2,674		21.5%
1970	3,087		15.4%
1980	3,467		12.3%
1990	3,627		4.6%
2000	3,631		0.1%
2010	4,331		19.3%
2020	4,453		2.8%
2023 (est.)	4,458	▲	0.1%
U.S. Decennial Census

=== 2020 census ===
As of the 2020 census, Georgetown had a population of 4,453. The median age was 41.2 years. 23.0% of residents were under the age of 18 and 21.6% of residents were 65 years of age or older. For every 100 females there were 99.4 males, and for every 100 females age 18 and over there were 94.7 males age 18 and over.

0.0% of residents lived in urban areas, while 100.0% lived in rural areas.

There were 1,782 households in Georgetown, of which 30.2% had children under the age of 18 living in them. Of all households, 36.8% were married-couple households, 19.6% were households with a male householder and no spouse or partner present, and 34.9% were households with a female householder and no spouse or partner present. About 35.3% of all households were made up of individuals and 16.0% had someone living alone who was 65 years of age or older.

There were 1,977 housing units, of which 9.9% were vacant. The homeowner vacancy rate was 2.3% and the rental vacancy rate was 8.2%.

Racial composition as of the 2020 census
Race	Number	Percent
White	4,096	92.0%
Black or African American	62	1.4%
American Indian and Alaska Native	8	0.2%
Asian	19	0.4%
Native Hawaiian and Other Pacific Islander	1	0.0%
Some other race	19	0.4%
Two or more races	248	5.6%
Hispanic or Latino (of any race)	49	1.1%

=== 2010 census ===
As of the census of 2010, there were 4,331 people, 1,722 households, and 1,085 families living in the village. The population density was 1,072.0 inhabitants per square mile (413.9/km^{2}). There were 1,939 housing units at an average density of 480.0 per square mile (185.3/km^{2}). The racial makeup of the village was 95.5% White, 1.9% African American, 0.3% Native American, 0.5% Asian, 0.2% from other races, and 1.6% from two or more races. Hispanic or Latino of any race were 0.6% of the population.

There were 1,722 households, of which 34.6% had children under the age of 18 living with them, 41.6% were married couples living together, 15.7% had a female householder with no husband present, 5.7% had a male householder with no wife present, and 37.0% were non-families. 32.7% of all households were made up of individuals, and 14.8% had someone living alone who was 65 years of age or older. The average household size was 2.36 and the average family size was 2.93.

The median age in the village was 38.6 years. 24.5% of residents were under the age of 18; 7.9% were between the ages of 18 and 24; 25.5% were from 25 to 44; 23.2% were from 45 to 64; and 18.7% were 65 years of age or older. The gender makeup of the village was 48.2% male and 51.8% female.

=== 2000 census ===
As of the census of 2000, there were 3,691 people, 1,565 households, and 996 families living in the village. The population density was 997.1 inhabitants per square mile (385.0/km^{2}). There were 1,702 housing units at an average density of 459.8 per square mile (177.5/km^{2}). The racial makeup of the village was 96.75% White, 2.00% African American, 0.11% Native American, 0.30% Asian, 0.11% from other races, and 0.73% from two or more races. Hispanic or Latino of any race were 0.43% of the population.

There were 1,565 households, out of which 33.4% had children under the age of 18 living with them, 43.1% were married couples living together, 15.5% had a female householder with no husband present, and 36.3% were non-families. 32.7% of all households were made up of individuals, and 15.4% had someone living alone who was 65 years of age or older. The average household size was 2.30 and the average family size was 2.89.

In the village, the population was spread out, with 25.3% under the age of 18, 9.4% from 18 to 24, 27.7% from 25 to 44, 21.7% from 45 to 64, and 15.8% who were 65 years of age or older. The median age was 36 years. For every 100 females there were 83.6 males. For every 100 females age 18 and over, there were 80.1 males.

The median income for a household in the village was $29,807, and the median income for a family was $37,371. Males had a median income of $31,897 versus $19,634 for females. The per capita income for the village was $18,112. About 11.7% of families and 14.5% of the population were below the poverty line, including 18.2% of those under age 18 and 17.0% of those age 65 or over.

== Arts and culture ==
President Ulysses S. Grant grew up and attended grade school in Georgetown. The schoolhouse is still in the town, where the locals refer to it as the Grant Schoolhouse. Also in Georgetown are Grant's childhood home and the tannery that his father owned across the street. All three are stops on the Land of Grant tour. Seventeen acres of the city were listed on the National Register of Historic Places in 1978 as the Georgetown Historic District.

Being the county seat, Georgetown hosts the Brown County Fair and parade. The headstone of General Thomas L. Hamer is in the old cemetery located by the Brown County Fairgrounds.

== Government ==
As of 2024, the mayor of Georgetown is Kelly Bolington, and the village administrator is Travis Dotson.

== Education ==
The village is served by the public Georgetown Exempted Village School District, which includes an elementary school and Georgetown Junior/Senior High School. Georgetown has a public library, a branch of the Brown County Public Library, known as the Mary P. Shelton public library.

== Infrastructure ==
=== Transportation ===
The Brown County Airport is located one nautical mile (1.2 mi; 1.9 km) northeast of Georgetown's central business district.

== Notable people ==
- Carr Van Anda, managing editor of The New York Times
- Marie Decca, lyric soprano operatic singer
- Electra Collins Doren, suffragette and library scientist
- Brian Grant, professional basketball player
- Ulysses S. Grant, 18th president of the United States and Union Army general
- Jesse Root Grant, father of Ulysses S. Grant, settled in Georgetown and was mayor in 1837
- Thomas L. Hamer, U.S. congressman who fought in the Mexican–American War
- August V. Kautz, U.S. Army Major General
- Albert Kautz, U.S. Navy Rear Admiral
- Robert A. Kehoe, toxicologist, proponent of leaded gasoline
- Rodney J. McKinley, chief master sergeant of the Air Force
- John Ruthven, wildlife artist
