= Red Oak Presbyterian Church =

Historic church in Ohio, United States

- U.S. National Register of Historic Places
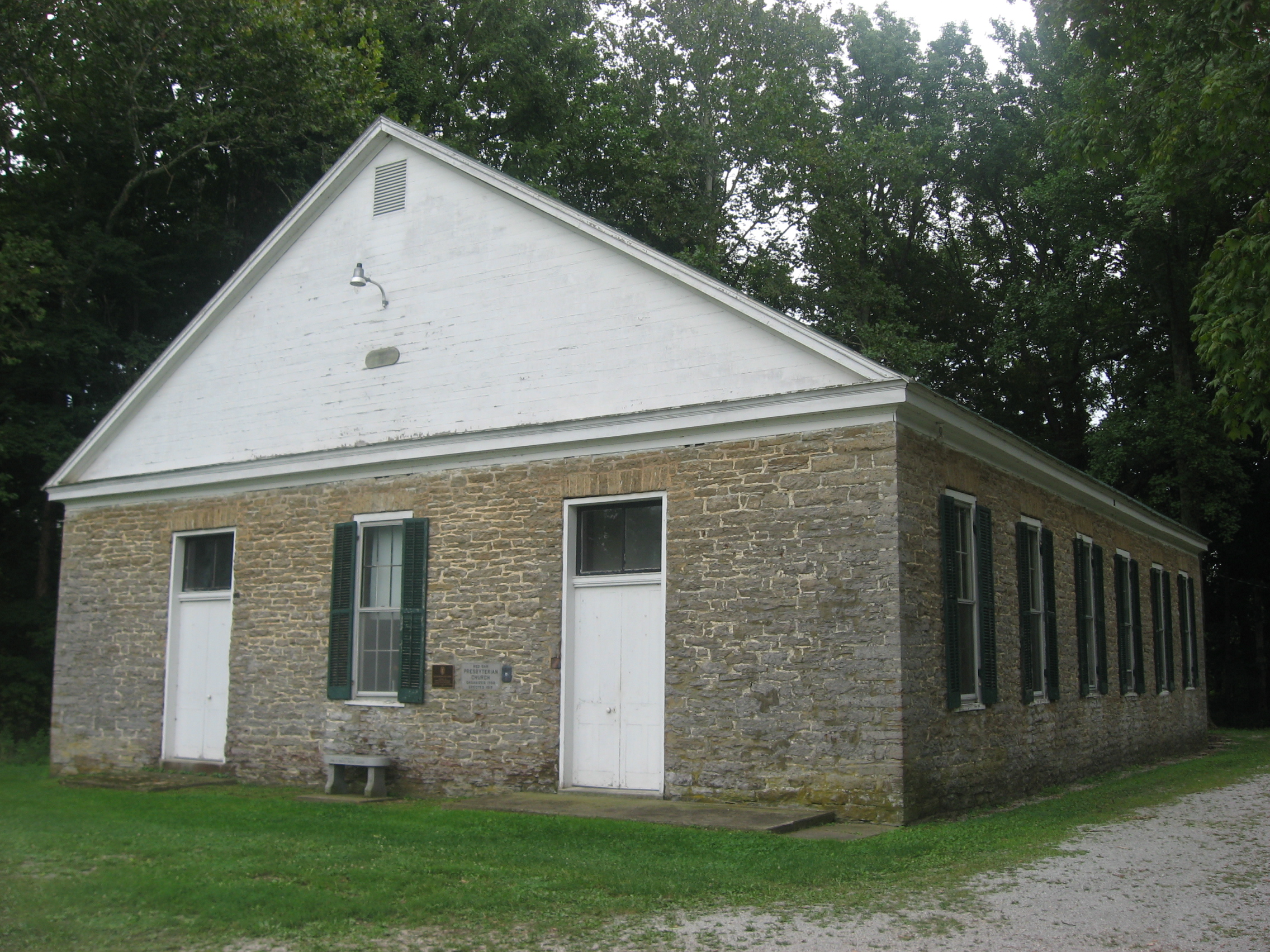
- Front and side of the church

- Location within Ohio Location within the United States
- Location: Cemetery Rd., Ripley, Ohio
- Coordinates: 38°47′43″N 83°47′44″W
- Area: 1 acre (0.40 ha)
- Built: 1817
- NRHP reference No.: 82003547
- Added to NRHP: June 17, 1982

Red Oak Presbyterian Church is a historic church on Cemetery Road in Ripley, Ohio.

The church was founded in 1798 and was the first church in Brown County. Its building, constructed in 1817, is a one-story vernacular stone building associated with southern Ohio abolitionist Reverend James Gilliland.

Gilliland, along with Ripley reverend John Rankin and West Union reverend Dyer Burgess, is claimed to have assisted hundreds of escaped slaves, and also preached and held rallies about abolition.

The church is listed on the American Presbyterian/Reformed Historic Sites Registry.

It was added to the National Register of Historic Places in 1982.
