= Decatur, Ohio =

Unincorporated community in Ohio, U.S.

- Unincorporated community
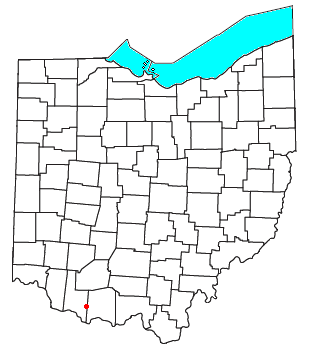
- Location of Decatur, Ohio
- Coordinates: 38°48′56″N 83°42′14″W
- Country: United States
- State: Ohio
- County: Brown
- Township: Byrd
- ZIP code: 45115

Decatur is an unincorporated community in eastern Byrd Township, Brown County, Ohio, United States. It has a post office with the ZIP code 45115. It is located along State Route 125, an east-west highway.

Decatur was originally called St. Clairsville, and under the latter name was laid out around 1802. A post office called Decatur has been in operation since 1817.

== Gallery ==
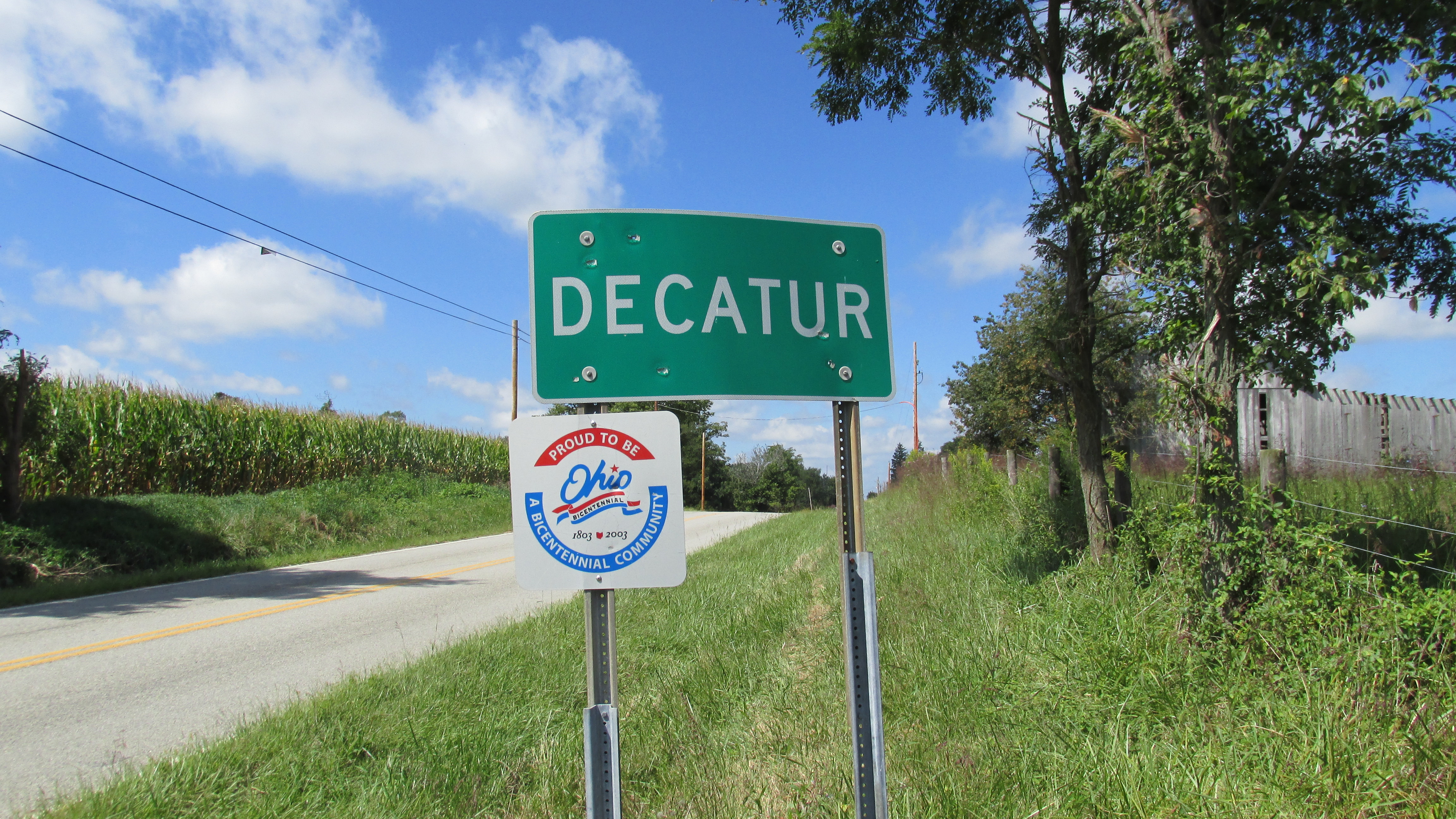
Decatur community sign

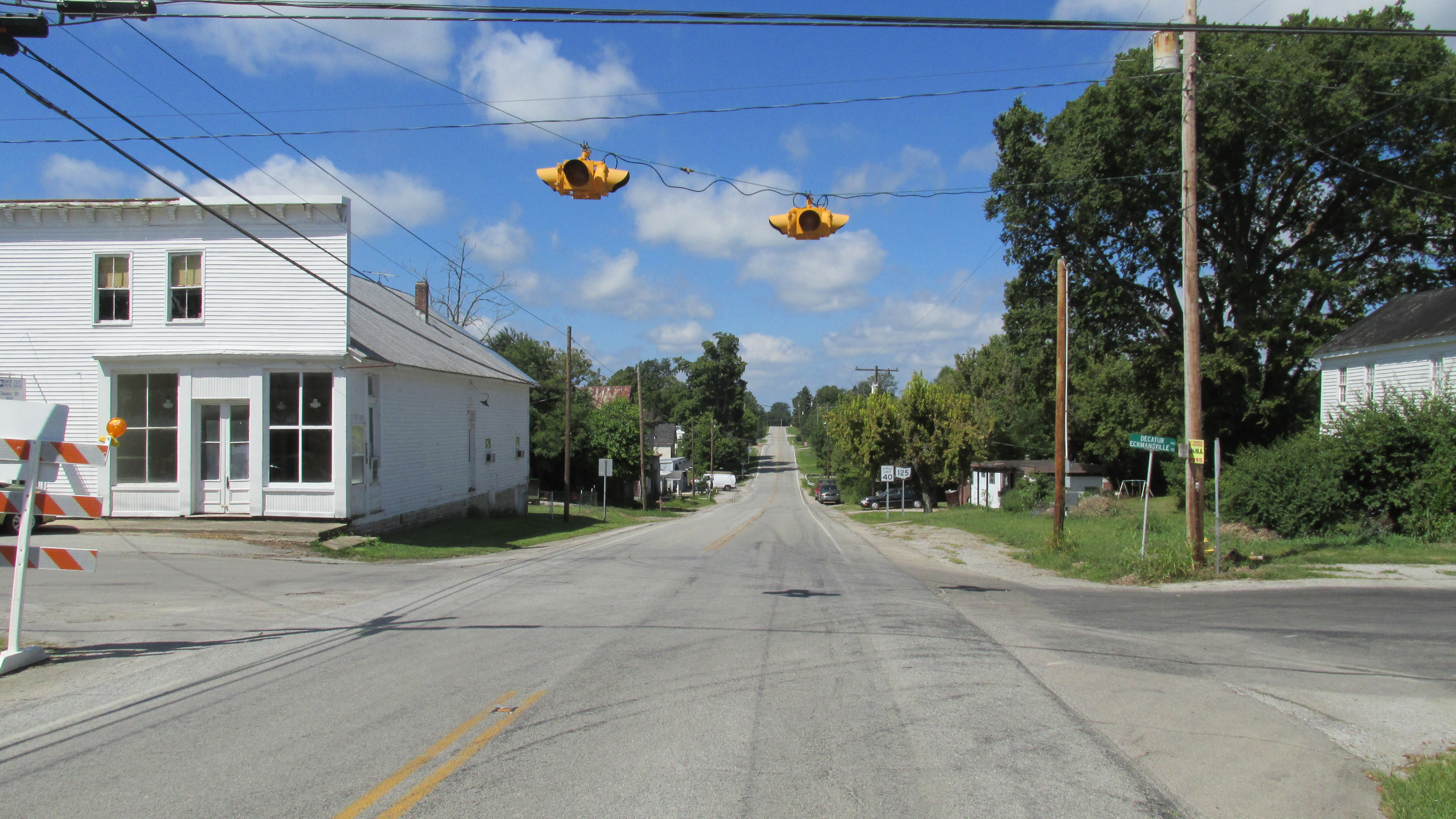
Looking west on Ohio Highway 125 in Decatur
