= Byrd Township, Ohio =

Township in Ohio, US

Byrd Township, Brown County, Ohio
- Township
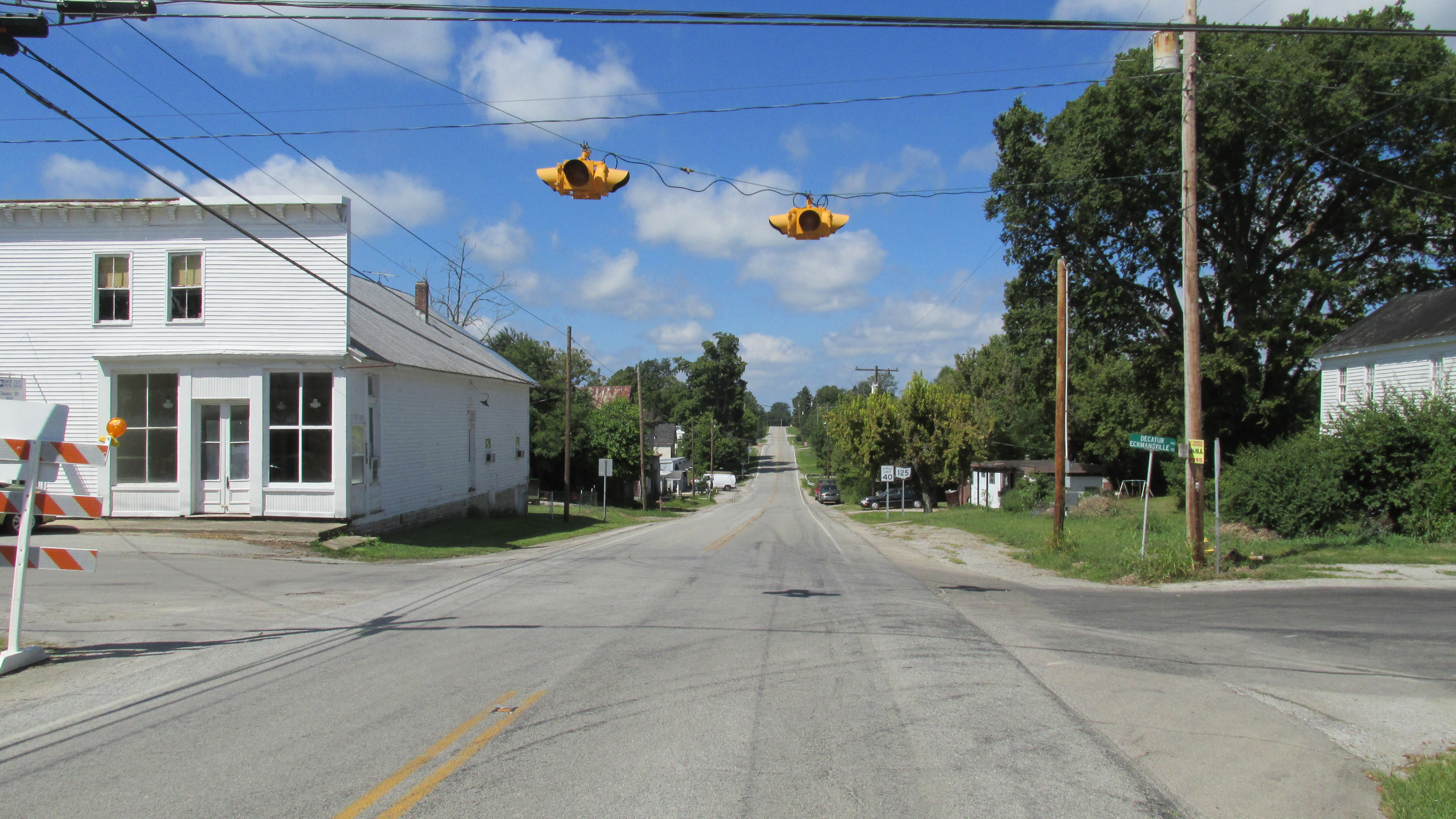
- State Route 125 in Decatur

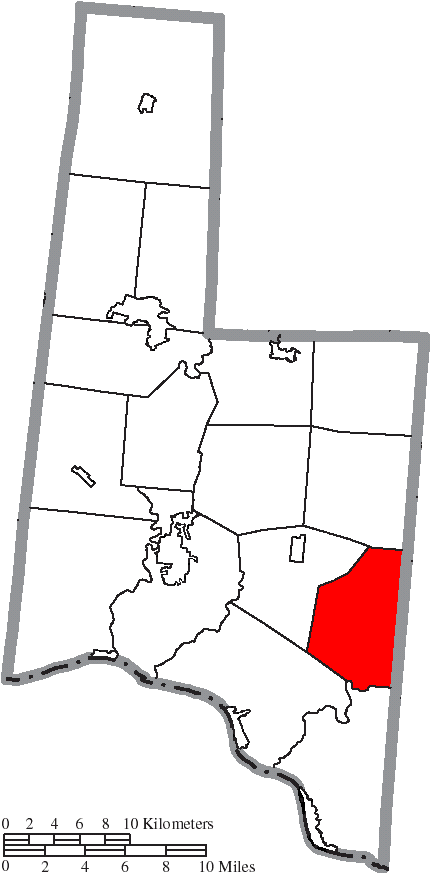
- Location of Byrd Township in Brown County
- Coordinates: 38°48′34″N 83°43′48″W
- Country: United States
- State: Ohio
- County: Brown

Area
  - Total: 25.31 sq mi (65.56 km^{2})
  - Land: 25.31 sq mi (65.54 km^{2})
  - Water: 0.0039 sq mi (0.01 km^{2})
- Elevation: 922 ft (281 m)

Population (2020)
  - Total: 733
  - Density: 29.0/sq mi (11.2/km^{2})
- Time zone: UTC-5 (Eastern (EST))
  - Summer (DST): UTC-4 (EDT)
- ZIP code: 45115
- Area codes: 937, 326
- FIPS code: 39-10758
- GNIS feature ID: 1085792

Byrd Township is one of the sixteen townships of Brown County, Ohio, United States. The 2020 census found 733 people in the township.

== Geography ==
Located in the southeastern part of the county, it borders the following townships:

- Jackson Township - north
- Wayne Township, Adams County - northeast
- Liberty Township, Adams County - east
- Huntington Township - south
- Union Township - southwest
- Jefferson Township - west

No municipalities are located in Byrd Township, although the unincorporated community of Decatur lies in the township's east.

== Name and history ==
It is the only Byrd Township statewide.

Byrd Township was named for Charles Willing Byrd, the Secretary of Northwest Territory.

Byrd Township had eighteen mills in 1833.

== Government ==
The township is governed by a three-member board of trustees, who are elected in November of odd-numbered years to a four-year term beginning on the following January 1. Two are elected in the year after the presidential election and one is elected in the year before it. There is also an elected township fiscal officer, who serves a four-year term beginning on April 1 of the year after the election, which is held in November of the year before the presidential election. Vacancies in the fiscal officership or on the board of trustees are filled by the remaining trustees.
