= Ripley, Ohio =

- Village
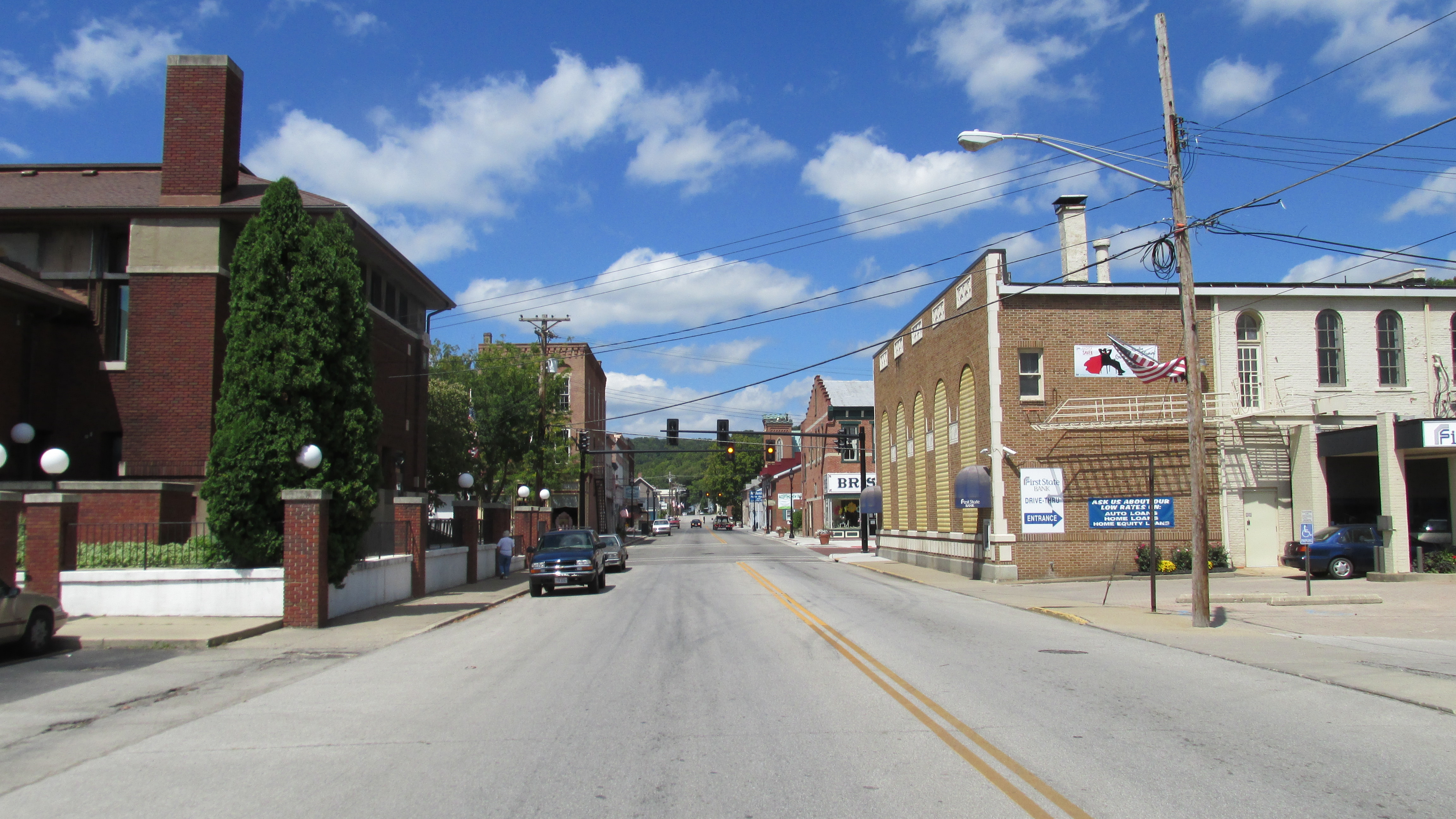
- Looking north on Second Street (U.S. Route 52) in Ripley

- Logo
- Motto: "Freedoms Landing - Where thousands found freedom on the Underground Railroad"
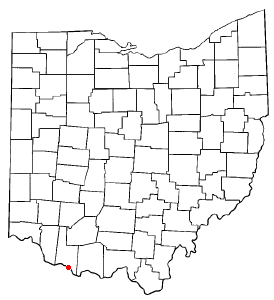
- Location of Ripley, Ohio

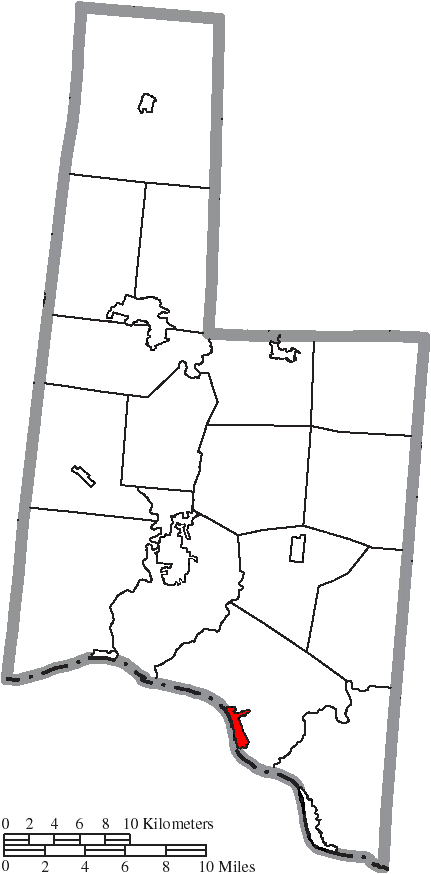
- Location of Ripley in Brown County
- Coordinates: 38°44′22″N 83°50′18″W
- Country: United States
- State: Ohio
- County: Brown
- Township: Union
- Named for: Eleazer Wheelock Ripley

Government
  - Mayor: Travis Arnett

Area
  - Total: 2.29 sq mi (5.94 km^{2})
  - Land: 1.99 sq mi (5.15 km^{2})
  - Water: 0.31 sq mi (0.79 km^{2})
- Elevation: 535 ft (163 m)

Population (2020)
  - Total: 1,591
  - Density: 800.0/sq mi (308.88/km^{2})
- Time zone: UTC-5 (Eastern (EST))
  - Summer (DST): UTC-4 (EDT)
- ZIP code: 45167
- Area codes: 937, 326
- FIPS code: 39-67272
- GNIS feature ID: 2399079
- Website: villageofripley.com

Ripley is a village in Union Township, Brown County, Ohio, United States, along the Ohio River 50 miles southeast of Cincinnati. The population was 1,591 at the 2020 census.

== History ==
Colonel James Poage, a veteran of the American Revolution, arrived in the free state of Ohio from Staunton, Virginia in 1804 to claim the 1,000 acres (4.0 km^{2}) he had been granted in what was called the Virginia Military District. Poage was among a large group of veterans who received land grants in what was first organized as the Northwest Territory north of the Ohio River for their service in the American Revolutionary War, and freed the people that they had enslaved when they settled there. Poage and his family laid out the town of Staunton in 1812; it was renamed in 1816 to honor General Eleazar Wheelock Ripley, an American officer of the War of 1812.

Given its location on the river, Ripley became a destination for slaves escaping from slavery in Kentucky on the other side. Both black and white residents developed a network, making Ripley an early stop on the Underground Railroad, to help slaves escape north to freedom. A number of prominent abolitionists lived in the town in the 19th century, mainly on Front Street near the river. John Rankin moved from Kentucky to Ripley in 1822 and later built a house on Liberty Hill overlooking the town, the river, and the Kentucky shore. From there, he signaled escaping slaves with a lantern on a flagpole and provided them shelter. The house is now known as the John Rankin House, and has been designated as a National Historic Landmark. Rankin was also the minister at the Ripley Presbyterian Church for twenty-four years.

== Geography ==
The town is surrounded by steep, rolling hills on the northeast, Red Oak Creek on the southeast, and the Ohio River on the southwest.

According to the United States Census Bureau, the village has a total area of 2.30 square miles (5.96 km^{2}), of which 1.99 square miles (5.15 km^{2}) is land and 0.31 square miles (0.80 km^{2}) is water.

== Demographics ==
Historical population
| Census | Pop. | Note | %± |
|---|---|---|---|
| 1820 | 421 | | — |
| 1830 | 572 | | 35.9% |
| 1840 | 816 | | 42.7% |
| 1850 | 1,780 | | 118.1% |
| 1860 | 2,715 | | 52.5% |
| 1870 | 2,323 | | −14.4% |
| 1880 | 2,546 | | 9.6% |
| 1890 | 2,483 | | −2.5% |
| 1900 | 2,248 | | −9.5% |
| 1910 | 1,840 | | −18.1% |
| 1920 | 1,529 | | −16.9% |
| 1930 | 1,556 | | 1.8% |
| 1940 | 1,623 | | 4.3% |
| 1950 | 1,792 | | 10.4% |
| 1960 | 2,174 | | 21.3% |
| 1970 | 2,745 | | 26.3% |
| 1980 | 2,174 | | −20.8% |
| 1990 | 1,816 | | −16.5% |
| 2000 | 1,745 | | −3.9% |
| 2010 | 1,750 | | 0.3% |
| 2020 | 1,591 | | −9.1% |
U.S. Decennial Census

=== 2010 census ===
As of the census of 2010, there were 1,750 people, 759 households, and 469 families living in the village. The population density was 879.4 inhabitants per square mile (339.5/km^{2}). There were 931 housing units at an average density of 467.8 per square mile (180.6/km^{2}). The racial makeup of the village was 92.6% White, 4.9% African American, 0.2% Native American, 0.2% Asian, and 2.2% from two or more races. Hispanic or Latino of any race were 0.5% of the population.

There were 759 households, of which 30.3% had children under the age of 18 living with them, 40.2% were married couples living together, 16.5% had a female householder with no husband present, 5.1% had a male householder with no wife present, and 38.2% were non-families. 32.5% of all households were made up of individuals, and 12.8% had someone living alone who was 65 years of age or older. The average household size was 2.31 and the average family size was 2.91.

The median age in the village was 42.2 years. 24.1% of residents were under the age of 18; 6.9% were between the ages of 18 and 24; 22.8% were from 25 to 44; 30% were from 45 to 64; and 15.9% were 65 years of age or older. The gender makeup of the village was 47.5% male and 52.5% female.

=== 2000 census ===
As of the census of 2000, there were 1,745 people, 745 households, and 467 families living in the village. The population density was 1,722.2 inhabitants per square mile (664.9/km^{2}). There were 896 housing units at an average density of 884.3 per square mile (341.4/km^{2}). The racial makeup of the village was 91.69% White, 6.65% African American, 0.06% Native American, 0.17% Asian, 0.17% from other races, and 1.26% from two or more races. Hispanic or Latino of any race were 0.69% of the population.

There were 745 households, out of which 28.9% had children under the age of 18 living with them, 44.0% were married couples living together, 16.2% had a female householder with no husband present, and 37.2% were non-families. 32.8% of all households were made up of individuals, and 16.9% had someone living alone who was 65 years of age or older. The average household size was 2.34 and the average family size was 2.97.

In the village, the population was spread out, with 24.9% under the age of 18, 9.2% from 18 to 24, 26.3% from 25 to 44, 21.9% from 45 to 64, and 17.8% who were 65 years of age or older. The median age was 38 years. For every 100 females, there were 83.1 males. For every 100 females age 18 and over, there were 79.8 males.

The median income for a household in the village was $30,000, and the median income for a family was $39,330. Males had a median income of $29,318 versus $20,977 for females. The per capita income for the village was $15,268. About 11.7% of families and 15.5% of the population were below the poverty line, including 21.9% of those under age 18 and 15.7% of those age 65 or over.

== Notable people ==
- William Q. Atwood, former slave
- Alexander Campbell, politician
- Steven M. Newman, "The Worldwalker," first man to walk solo around the world
- John Parker, abolitionist, inventor and industrialist
- John Rankin, abolitionist and Presbyterian minister
- Ralph Vance, politician from Nebraska
- Russell Smith, jazz trumpeter
- Steve Stivers, U.S. Representative for Ohio's 15th congressional district
- Colonel Charles Young, first black man to achieve the rank of colonel in the United States Army

== Gallery ==
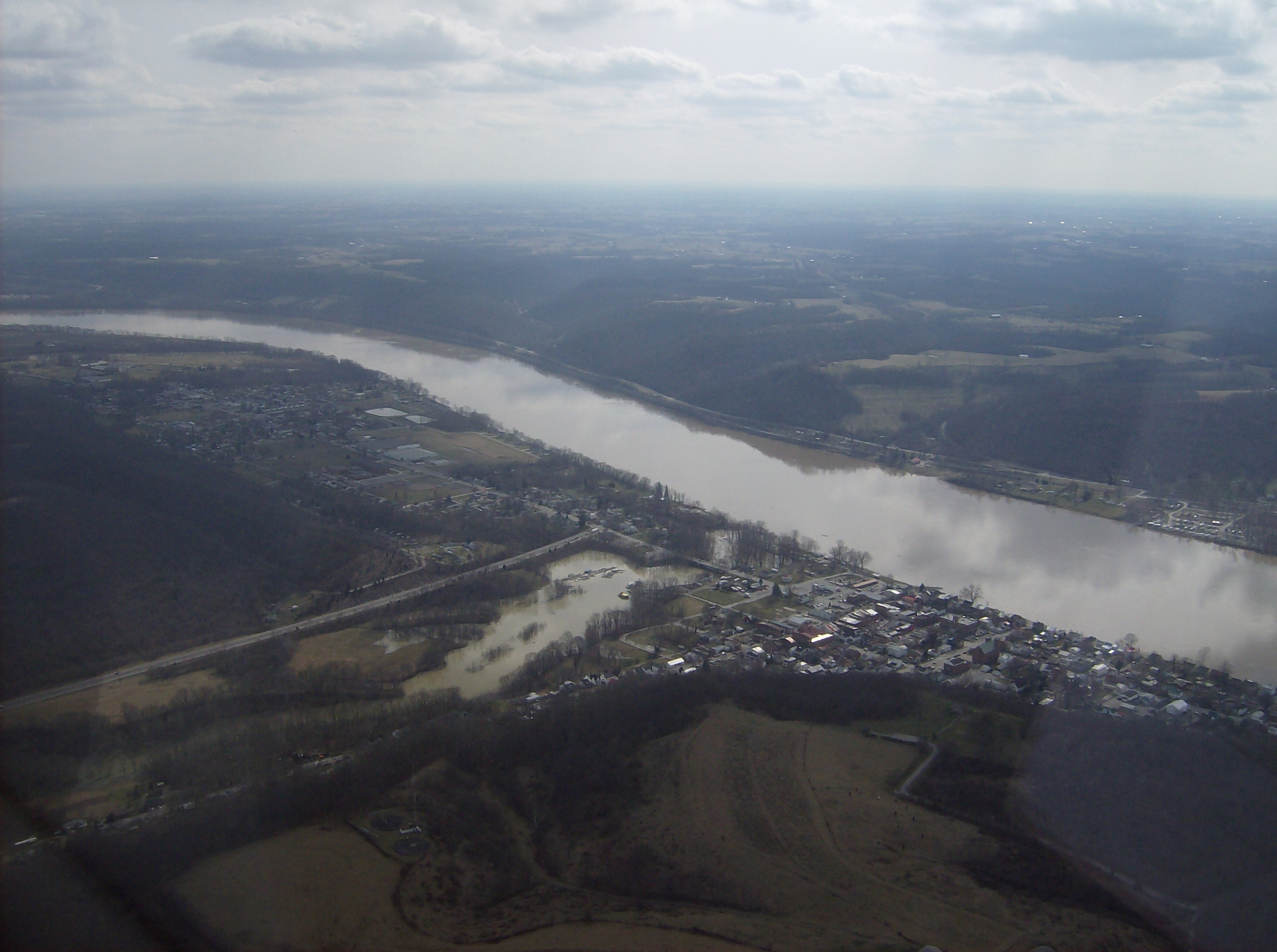
Aerial view of Ripley from the north.

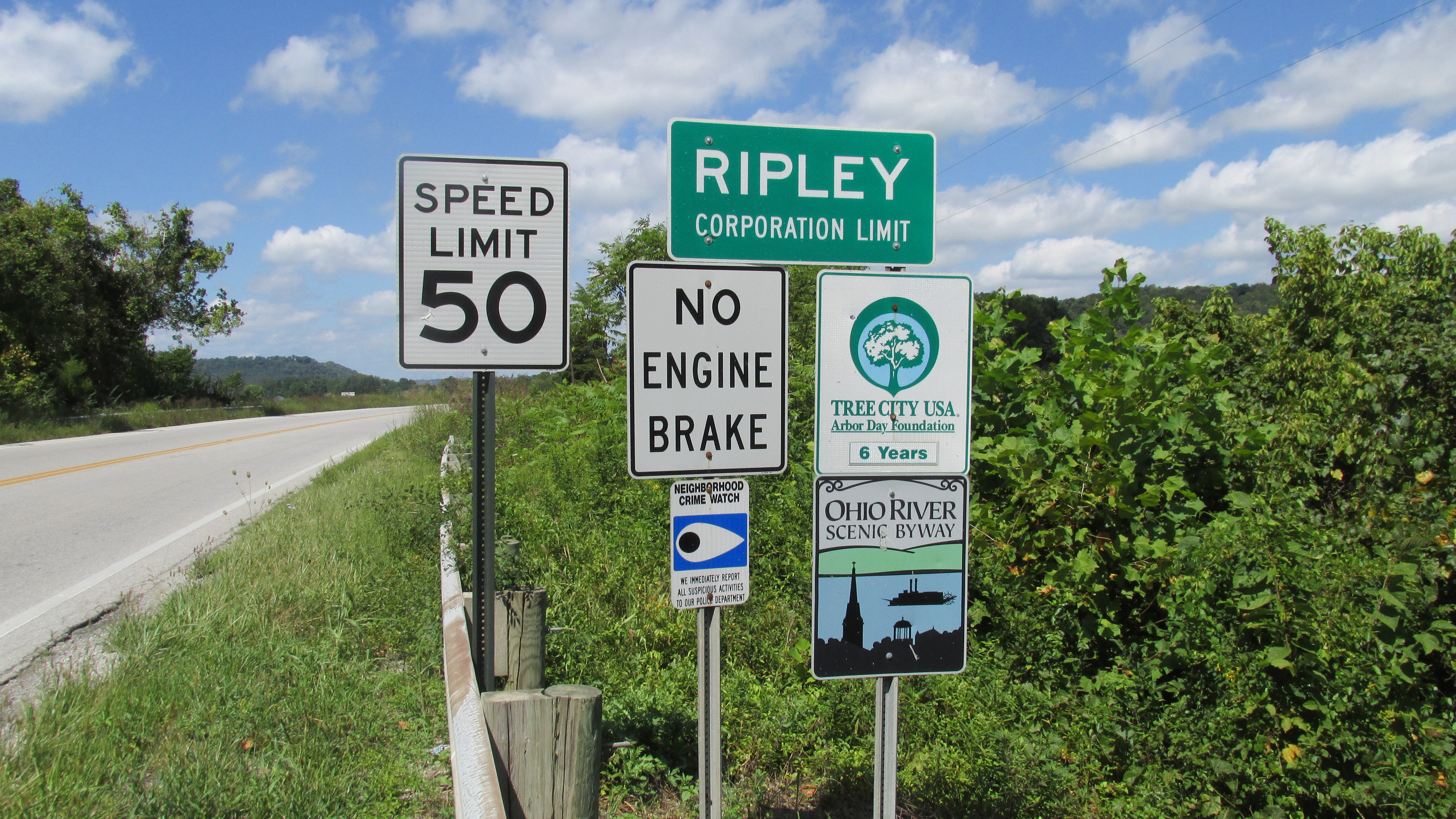
Ripley corporation limit sign.

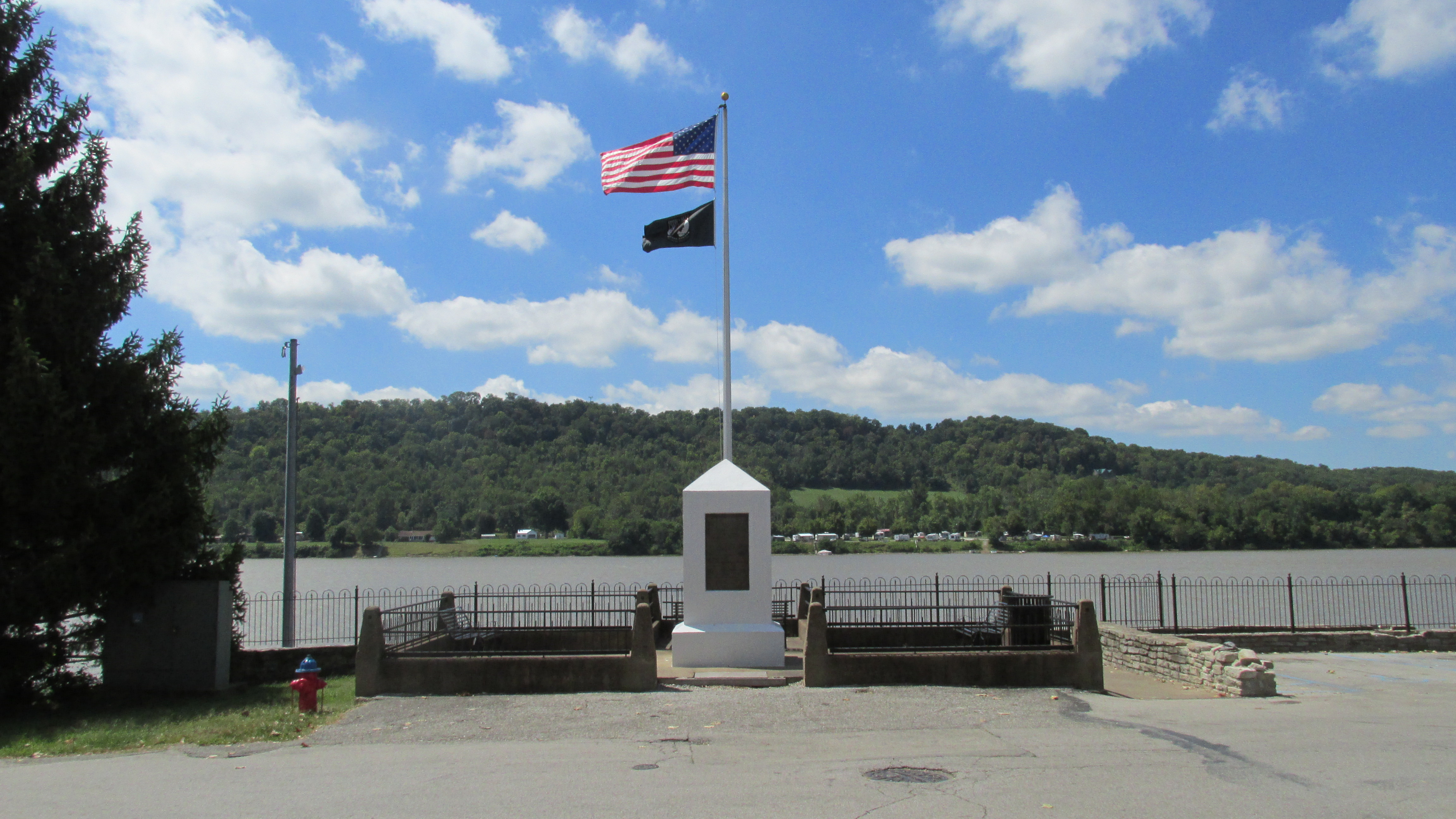
Liberty Monument on the Ohio River that was dedicated in 1912.

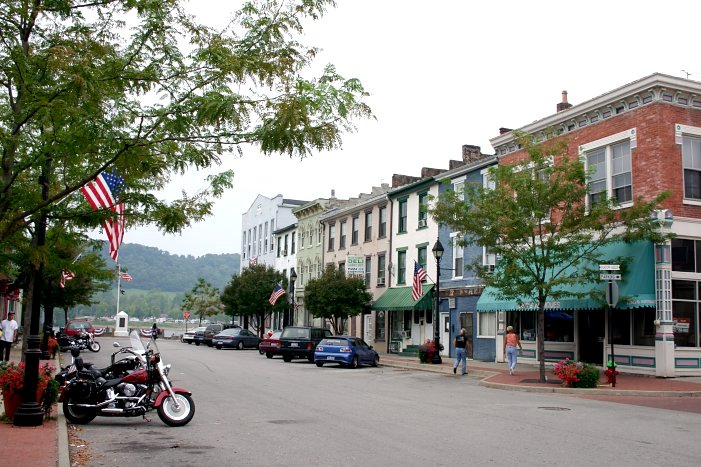
Main Street ends at the Ohio River in Ripley, Ohio.

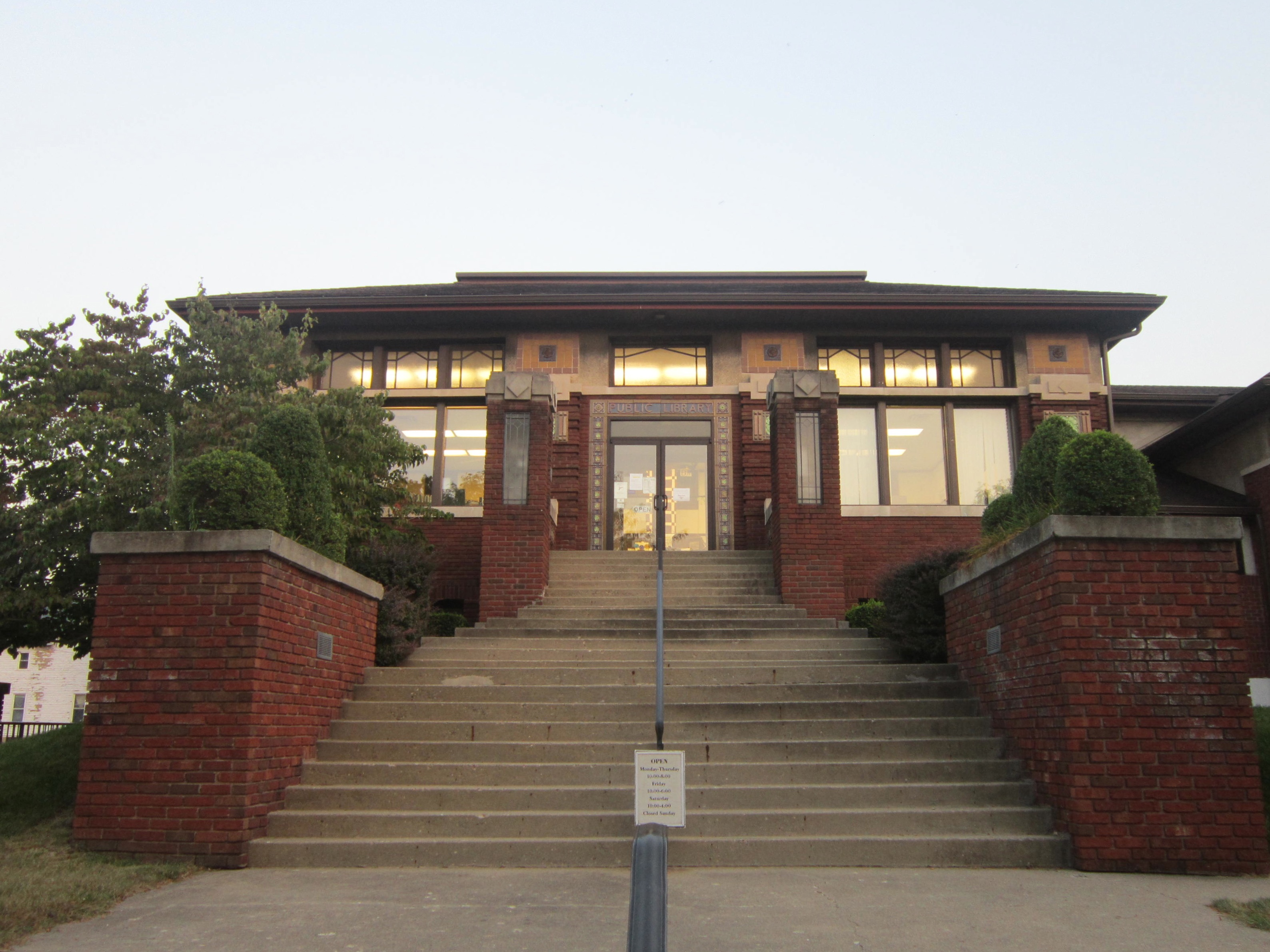
Union Township Public Library, Ripley, Ohio, 2015

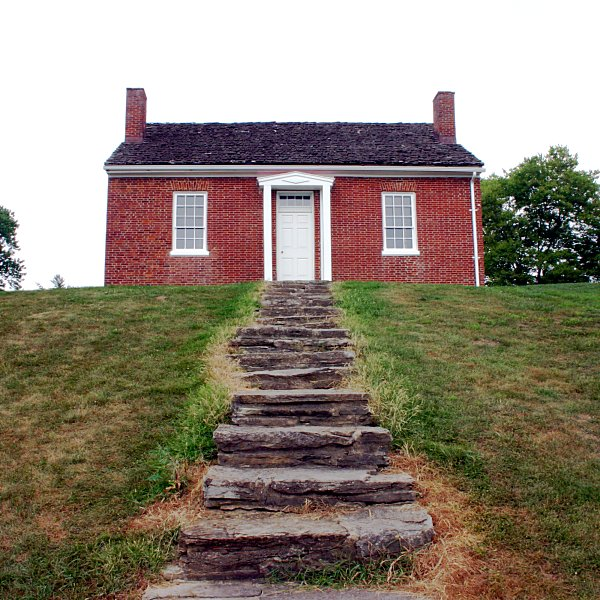
John Rankin House, Ripley, Ohio, 2005

== See also ==
- List of Underground Railroad sites
- List of cities and towns along the Ohio River
