= Fincastle =

Fincastle (from the Celtic Fonachajsical, "the Land of Castles") is a glen in Perth and Kinross, Scotland. It may also refer to:

== Places ==
- Fincastle, Alberta, a locality in Canada
- Fincastle, Indiana, an unincorporated community
- Fincastle, Kentucky, United States
- Fincastle, Lee County, Kentucky, an unincorporated community
- Fincastle, Ohio, an unincorporated community
- Fincastle, Tennessee, an unincorporated community
- Fincastle, Texas, an unincorporated community
- Fincastle, Virginia, United States
  - Fincastle Historic District, Fincastle, VA
- Fincastle County, Virginia, a former county

== Other ==
- Viscount of Fincastle, a title related to the Earl of Dunmore; also refers to the person holding the title, i.e. "Lord Fincastle"
- Fincastle Turnpike, a toll road in Virginia
- Fincastle Chapel, a former church building in Perth and Kinross, Scotland
- The Fincastle competition, a yearly competition among the Commonwealth Air Forces
- Fincastle Resolutions, declarations of Fincastle Cty, VA just prior to the revolution

== See also ==
- Fort Fincastle (disambiguation)
- Fin Castle, a castle in Hormozgan Province, Iran
- Fan Castle or Fan City, an ancient fortified city now the Fancheng District of Xiangyang, China
- Castle Fin, Illinois, an unincorporated community
