= Ohio State Route 353 =

State highway in Brown County, Ohio, US

State Route 353

Route information
- Maintained by ODOT
- Length: 4.60 mi (7.40 km)
- Existed: 1935–present

Major junctions
- West end: US 62 near Russellville
- East end: SR 125 near Decatur

Location
- Country: United States
- State: Ohio
- Counties: Brown

Highway system
- Ohio State Highway System; Interstate; US; State; Scenic
| ← SR 352 | → SR 354 |

State Route 353 (SR 353) is an east–west state highway in southwestern Ohio, a U.S. state. Its western terminus is at U.S. Route 62 (US 62) about four and a half miles (7.2 km) south of Russellville, and its eastern terminus is near the unincorporated community of Decatur at SR 125. The entire route is a two-lane highway, passing through farmland and woodland. The route was commissioned in the mid-1930s and was paved in the mid-1950s.

== Route description ==
SR 353 begins at an intersection with US 62, immediately north of US 68, in the unincorporated community of Redoak. The highway heads northeast, as a two-lane highway, passing through farmland. The road curves towards the east, after having an intersection with Township Road 227 (T–227). The route crosses over the West Fork of the Eagle Creek, before having an intersection with T–221 (West Fork Road). After T–221, SR 353 curves to the northeast, paralleling the creek. The highway makes a sharp turn towards the east, leaving the creek, and passing through woodland. The road has an intersection with SR 763, before meeting its eastern terminus at SR 125. This state highway runs entirely within the eastern part of Brown County. It is not included as a portion of the National Highway System.

== History ==
SR 353 was established in 1935 along the routing between US 62 and SR 125 that it occupies today. The entire route was paved between 1953 and 1955. The highway has not experienced any major changes since 1955.

== Major intersections ==
The entire route is in Brown County.

| Location | mi | km | Destinations | Notes |
|---|---|---|---|---|
| Jefferson Township | 0.00 | 0.00 | US 62 | Western terminus of SR 353 |
| Byrd Township | 4.57 | 7.35 | SR 763 | |
| Byrd Township | 4.60 | 7.40 | SR 125 | Eastern terminus of SR 353 |
1.000 mi = 1.609 km; 1.000 km = 0.621 mi
