= Lake Waynoka, Ohio =

- CDP
- View from dam

- Flag Logo

- Location within Ohio
- Coordinates: 38°56′24″N 83°46′43″W
- Country: United States
- State: Ohio
- County: Brown

Area
  - Total: 4.79 sq mi (12.40 km^{2})
  - Land: 4.27 sq mi (11.05 km^{2})
  - Water: 0.52 sq mi (1.35 km^{2})
- Elevation: 1,004 ft (306 m)

Population (2020)
  - Total: 1,381
  - Density: 323.6/sq mi (124.94/km^{2})
- Time zone: UTC-5 (Eastern (EST))
  - Summer (DST): UTC-4 (EDT)
- ZIP code: 45171
- Area codes: 937, 326
- FIPS code: 39-41657
- GNIS feature ID: 2628922

Lake Waynoka is a census-designated place (CDP) and gated community in Brown County, Ohio, United States, located around a similarly named reservoir between Sardinia and Russellville. The population was 1,381 at the 2020 census.

== Demographics ==
Historical population
Census	Pop.	Note	%±
2020	1,381		—
U.S. Decennial Census

== History ==
In 1970, American Realty Service Corporation of Memphis, Tennessee, began the development of Lake Waynoka by buying farm land, damming the headwaters of Straight Creek, a tributary of the Ohio River, and dividing the land into lots roughly one-third of an acre in size. American Realty also created other lake communities.

Over the years, Lake Waynoka has transitioned from a weekend and summer get-away spot to a community of full-time residents with a high rate of continued growth. Migration from Cincinnati and Dayton has helped continue this growth.

== Businesses ==
Just a few businesses in Lake Waynoka.

- Vacation Architect LLC
- Drain Cleaning and Plumbing LLC
- Chisel and Plane Workshop
- Country in Clover
- Angela's Curbside
- Ohio Sourdough LLC
- Local Lake Living, LLC
