= Arnheim (surname) =

Arnheim is a surname. Notable people with the surname include:

- Edith Arnheim (1884–1964), Swedish tennis player
- Fritz Arnheim (1866–1922), German historian
- Gus Arnheim (1897–1955), American band leader
- Michael Arnheim (born 1944), German-English barrister and author
- Rudolf Arnheim (1904–2007), German American author
- Walter Arnheim (born 10 October 1944), American businessman and non-profit manager

Fictional characters:

- Paul Arnheim, character in the novel The Man Without Qualities by Robert Musil

== See also ==
- Arnheim (disambiguation)
