= Ohio State Route 763 =

State highway in Brown County, Ohio, US

State Route 763

Route information
- Maintained by O.D.O.T.
- Length: 12.70 mi (20.44 km)
- Existed: 1937–present

Major junctions
- South end: SR 41 near Aberdeen
- North end: SR 125 near Russellville

Location
- Country: United States
- State: Ohio
- Counties: Brown

Highway system
- Ohio State Highway System; Interstate; US; State; Scenic
← SR 762	→ SR 764

State Route 763 (SR 763) is north–south state highway in the southern portion of the U.S. state of Ohio. The route's southern terminus is at a T-intersection with SR 41 about 1.50 miles (2.41 km) north of Aberdeen. Its northern terminus is at SR 125 about 5.50 miles (8.85 km) southeast of Russellville, at a point that is adjacent to the eastern terminus of SR 353.

== Route description ==
The entirety of SR 763 is located in the southeastern quadrant of Brown County. SR 763 is not a part of the National Highway System, a network of highways deemed most important for the economy, mobility and defense of the nation.

== History ==
SR 763 first appeared in 1937. Its original routing is the same as that which it utilizes today through southeastern Brown County. No changes of major significance have taken place to the state highway since its designation.

== Major intersections ==
The entire route is in Brown County.

Location	mi	km	Destinations	Notes
Huntington Township	0.00	0.00	SR 41	
Byrd Township	12.67	20.39	SR 353	
Byrd Township	12.70	20.44	SR 125	
1.000 mi = 1.609 km; 1.000 km = 0.621 mi
