= Ash Ridge =

Ash Ridge or Ashridge may refer to:

- Ash Ridge, Ohio, an unincorporated community in Brown County
- Ash Ridge, Wisconsin, an unincorporated community in Richland County
- Ashridge, a country estate and stately home in Hertfordshire, England in the United Kingdom
  - Ashridge Executive Education, a business school at the above estate
