= Eastern High School (Winchester, Ohio) =

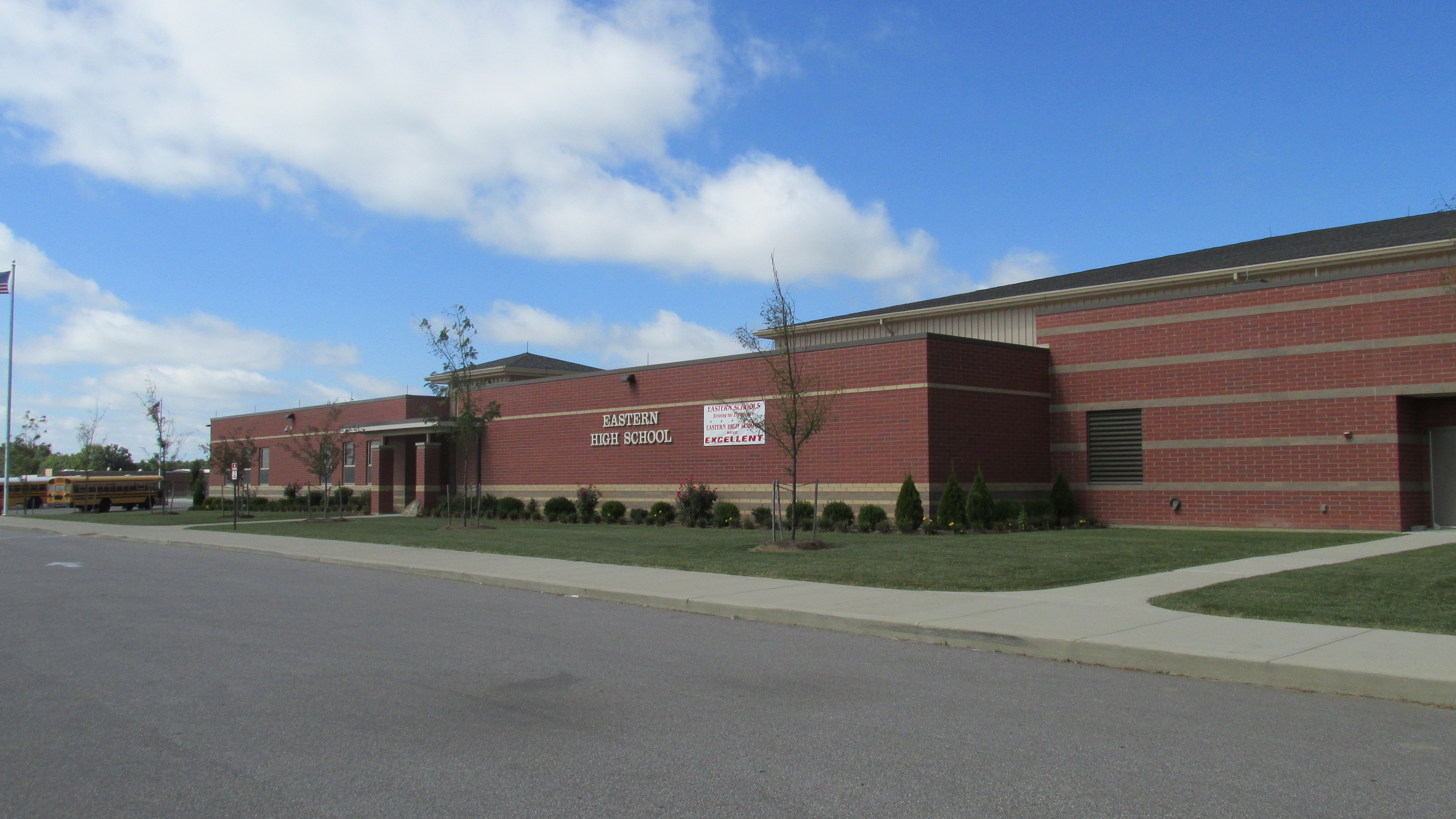

Location
- 11557 U.S. Route 62; Sardinia, Brown County, Ohio 45697; United States
- Coordinates: 38°57′11″N 83°44′22″W

Information
- Type: Public, coeducational high school
- School district: Eastern Local School District
- Superintendent: Jordan Michael
- NCES School ID: 390460302411
- Principal: Kara Pinkerton
- Grades: 9-12
- Enrollment: 274 (2023-2024)
- Student to teacher ratio: 14.77
- Colors: Red and white
- Fight song: On, Wisconsin
- Athletics: basketball, soccer, volleyball, softball, baseball, golf, bowling, cross country, track and field - marching band/color guard
- Athletics conference: Southern Hills Athletic League
- Mascot: Warrior
- Team name: Warriors
- Website: Official website

Eastern High School is a public high school in Sardinia, Brown County, Ohio, USA. It is the only high school in the Eastern Local School District.

== Athletics ==
The school colors are red and white. The mascot is the Warrior.
