= McCafferty Road Covered Bridge =

Covered bridge in Ohio, built in 1877

Coordinates: 39°09′05″N 83°59′40″W

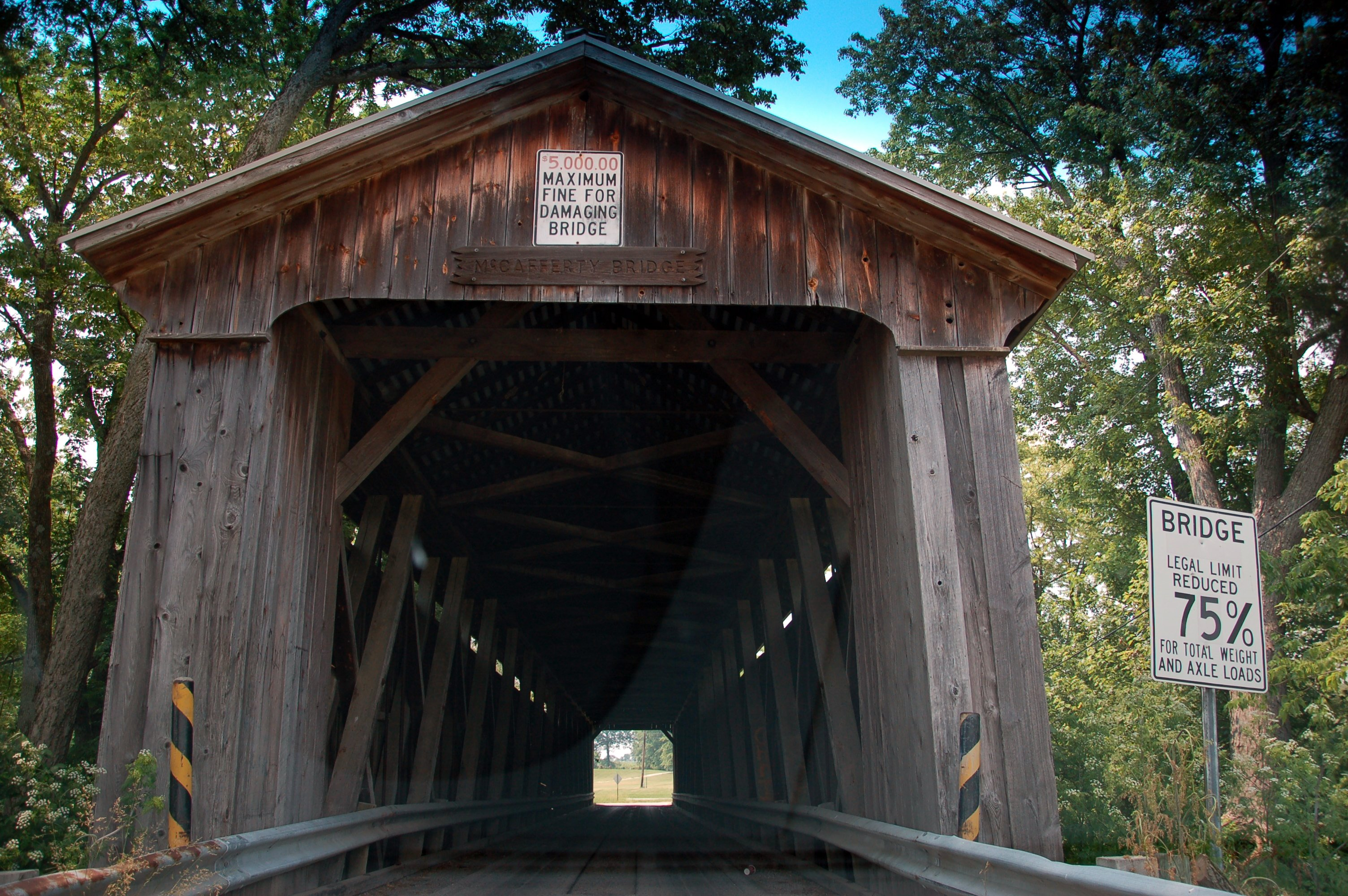

The McCafferty Road Covered Bridge, in Brown County, Ohio, is a historic covered bridge built in 1877. Located in the unincorporated community of Vera Cruz, it spans the East Fork of the Little Miami River.

It was built in 1877 by the Smith Bridge Company. In 2021 it was open for traffic, and is unpainted.
