= White Oak, Brown County, Ohio =

Unincorporated community in Ohio, U.S.

Coordinates: 39°00′57″N 83°52′37″W

White Oak is an unincorporated community in Brown County, in the U.S. state of Ohio.

== History ==
A post office called White Oak was established in 1878, and remained in operation until 1919. The community takes its name from nearby White Oak Creek.
