= White Oak Creek (Brown County, Ohio) =

Coordinates: 38°47′15″N 83°57′9″W

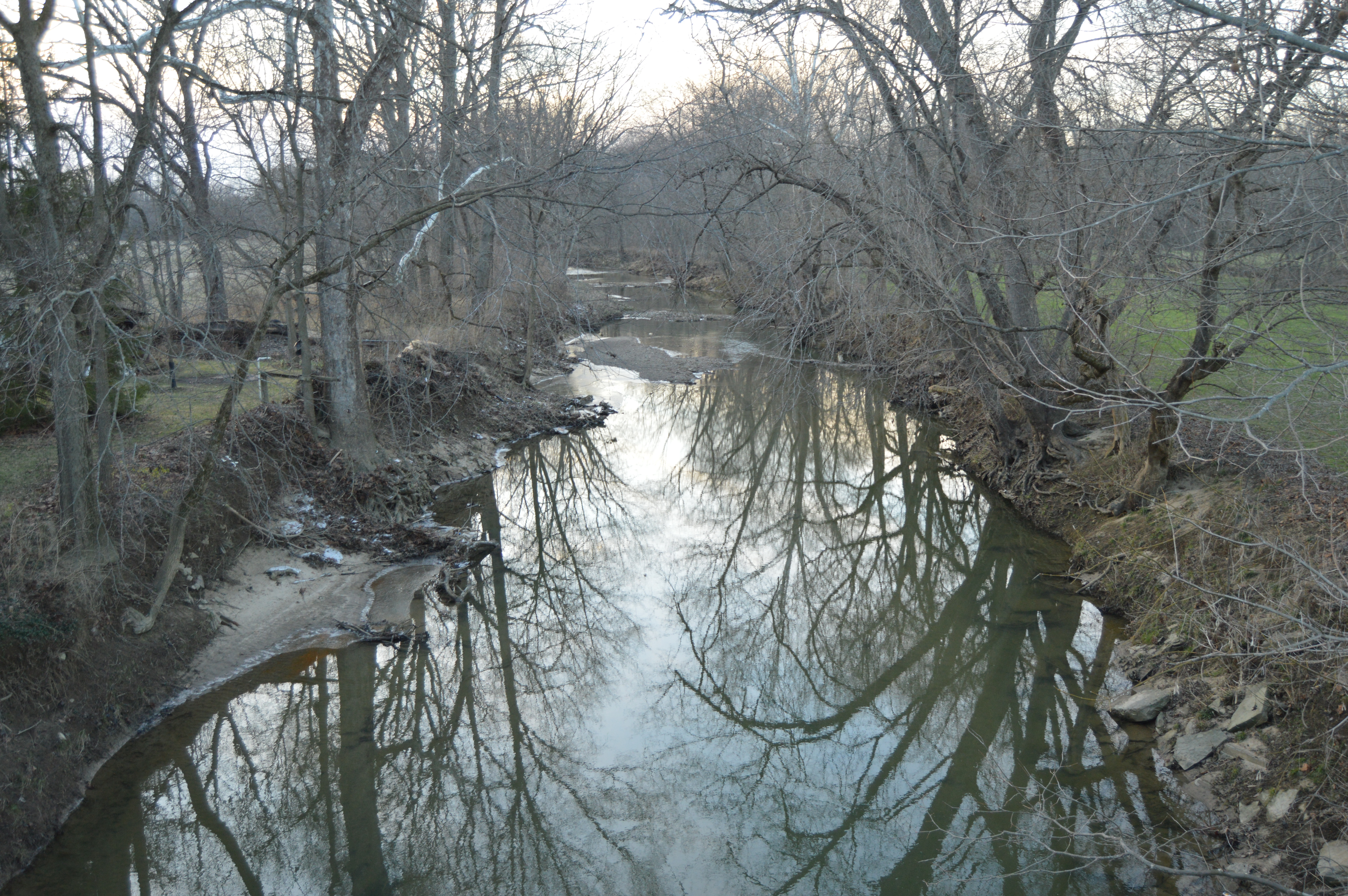
- White Oak Creek near Sardinia

Location
- Country: United States
- State: Ohio
- Counties: Highland, Brown
- Cities: New Hope, White Oak Valley, Georgetown

Physical characteristics
- Mouth: Ohio River
  - location: Ohio
- Discharge
  - location: Georgetown
  - average: 267.8 cubic feet per second (7.58 m^{3}/s)

White Oak Creek is a stream located primarily within Brown County, Ohio. It begins in Highland County, Ohio.

The stream was named for the white oak timber along its course.

A USGS stream gauge on the creek near Georgetown recorded a mean annual discharge of 267.8 cubic feet per second (7.58 m^{3}/s) during water years 1925–2011.

== See also ==
- List of rivers of Ohio
