= Arnheim =

Arnheim may refer to:

- Arnheim (surname)
- Arnheim, Michigan
- Arnheim, Ohio
- Arnheim (Radford, Virginia)

== See also ==
- "The Domain of Arnheim" (1847), a short story by Edgar Allan Poe
- "Domain of Arnheim" (1938-1962), a series of paintings by René Magritte
- Arnhem (disambiguation)
