= William W. Ellsberry =

American politician

William Wallace Ellsberry

Member of the U.S. House of Representatives from Ohio's 11th district
- In office March 4, 1885 – March 3, 1887
- Preceded by: John W. McCormick
- Succeeded by: Albert C. Thompson

Personal details
- Born: December 18, 1833 New Hope, Ohio, U.S.
- Died: September 7, 1894 (aged 60) Georgetown, Ohio, U.S.
- Resting place: Confidence Cemetery
- Party: Democratic
- Education: University of Cincinnati College of Medicine

William Wallace Ellsberry (December 18, 1833 – September 7, 1894) was an American physician and politician and a U.S. Representative from Ohio for one term from 1885 to 1887.

== Early life and career ==
Born in New Hope, Ohio, Ellsberry attended the public schools of Brown County and a private academy in Clermont County. He taught school two years. Began the study of medicine with his father. He attended medical lectures and graduated from the Cincinnati College of Medicine and Surgery, and later from the Ohio Medical College. He engaged in the practice of his profession at Georgetown, Ohio, until his election to Congress. County auditor. He served as delegate to the Democratic National Convention in 1880.

== Congress ==
Ellsberry was elected as a Democrat to the Forty-ninth Congress (March 4, 1885 – March 3, 1887). He was not a candidate for renomination in 1886.

== Later career and death ==
He resumed the practice of medicine until his death in Georgetown, Ohio, September 7, 1894. He was interred in Confidence Cemetery.

U.S. House of Representatives
Preceded by John W. McCormick	Member of the U.S. House of Representatives from Ohio's 11th congressional district March 4, 1885-March 3, 1887	Succeeded by Albert C. Thompson
