= George Freeland Barbour =

Scottish author, philosopher and Liberal Party politician

George Freeland Barbour (15 February 1882 – 18 November 1946) was a Scottish author, philosopher and Liberal Party politician.

== Background ==
He was born in Cults, Aberdeenshire, a son of the Rev Robert William Barbour (1854-1891) of Bonskeid, and his wife, Charlotte Rachel Fowler of Gastard, Wiltshire.

He was educated at Morrison's Academy, Crieff and Edinburgh University. In 1905, he obtained a Master of Arts and in 1910 was awarded a Doctor of Philosophy.

In 1919, he married Helen Victoria Hepburn-Scott. They had two sons and three daughters. His daughter, Caroline Victoria, married journalist Julian Haviland. A son, Robin Barbour, was appointed Moderator of the General Assembly of the Church of Scotland in 1979.

== Career ==
In 1904 Barbour became Joint Honorary Secretary of the Scottish Temperance Legislation Board, a role he carried out until 1913. He was Liberal candidate for the West Perthshire division at the December 1910 General Election. This had always been a Unionist seat apart from 1906 when it went Liberal. The Unionists had regained it in January 1910 and held off the challenge from Barbour 11 months later;

Dec 1910 general election: Western Perthshire Electorate 8,715
Party	Candidate	Votes	%	±%
Conservative	Marquess of Tullibardine	4,027	52.5	+0.5
Liberal	George Freeland Barbour	3,637	47.5	−0.5
Majority		390	5.0	+1.0
Turnout		7,664	87.9	+1.0
Conservative hold		Swing	+0.5	

After the election he continued his involvement as Chairman of West Perthshire Liberal Association. In 1913 he became a member of the Royal Commission on Housing for Scotland, serving for four years. In 1919 he started working for the newly created League of Nations Union. He worked for the Union for the next 20 years. In 1919 he was appointed to the Perthshire Education Authority and served on that body for 25 years. After a gap of 19 years and four general elections he was again Liberal candidate for Kinross and Western Perthshire at the 1929 General Election. The constituency had been fought on new boundaries in 1918 when a Liberal won. The Liberals won in 1922 but in 1923 the seat went Unionist. In 1924 there was no Liberal candidate. Barbour had been selected as prospective parliamentary candidate in 1925 so had spent time nursing the division. His hopes of regaining the seat were made harder by the presence of a Labour candidate who managed to poll enough votes to allow the Unionist to win;

General Election 1929: Kinross and Western Perthshire Electorate 33,408
Party	Candidate	Votes	%	±%
Unionist	Duchess of Atholl	12,245	48.6	−23.4
Liberal	George Freeland Barbour	9,128	36.2	n/a
Labour	Rev. W.D. Stewart	3,834	15.2	−12.8
Majority		3,117	12.4	−31.6
Turnout			75.5	
Unionist hold		Swing	n/a	

He did not stand for parliament again. He served as a Justice of the peace. In 1942 he was elected as a Member of Perth and Kinross County Council, serving for three years, serving on the Education Committee. He was a Member of the British Council of Churches and the Provisional Committee of the World Council of Churches.

== Land ==
Barbour owned the Linn of Tummel, a 19-hectare (47-acre) woodland property at the confluence of the rivers Garry and Tummel, near Pitlochry in Perthshire, Scotland. In 1944 he donated the Linn to the National Trust for Scotland. He donated his ancestral home of Bonskeid to YMCA to use as a holiday home.

He was a worshipper and preacher "for many years" at Fincastle Chapel, near Blair Atholl. Memorial plaques to both himself and his mother are within the chapel.

== Publications ==
- The Old Quadrangle (joint-author), 1907
- A Philosophical Study of Christian Ethics, 1911
- The Ethical Approach to Theism, 1913
- The Unity of the Spirit, 1921
- Life of Alexander Whyte, DD, 1923
- Addresses in a Highland Chapel, 1924
- Katherine Scott—a Memoir, 1929
- Pringle-Pattison’s Realism (ed. with Memoir), 1933
