= Locust Ridge, Ohio =

Unincorporated community in Ohio, U.S.

Coordinates: 38°59′31″N 84°00′26″W

Locust Ridge is an unincorporated community in Brown County, in the U.S. state of Ohio.

== History ==
The first settlement at Locust Ridge was made around 1835. A post office called Locust Ridge was established in 1856, and remained in operation until 1907.
