= Greenbush, Brown County, Ohio =

Unincorporated community in Ohio, U.S.

Coordinates: 39°04′31″N 83°55′31″W

Greenbush is an unincorporated community in Brown County, in the U.S. state of Ohio.

== History ==
Greenbush was laid out in 1838. The community was named for a patch of green bushes near the original town site.
