= Levanna, Ohio =

Unincorporated community in Ohio, U.S.

Coordinates: 38°45′59″N 83°53′02″W

Levanna is an unincorporated community in Union Township, Brown County, in the U.S. state of Ohio.

== History ==
The first settlement at Levanna was made in 1799. A post office called Levanna opened in 1822, closed in 1831, reopened in 1867, and closed permanently in 1932.
