= Linn of Tummel =

Coordinates: 56.721°N 3.785°W

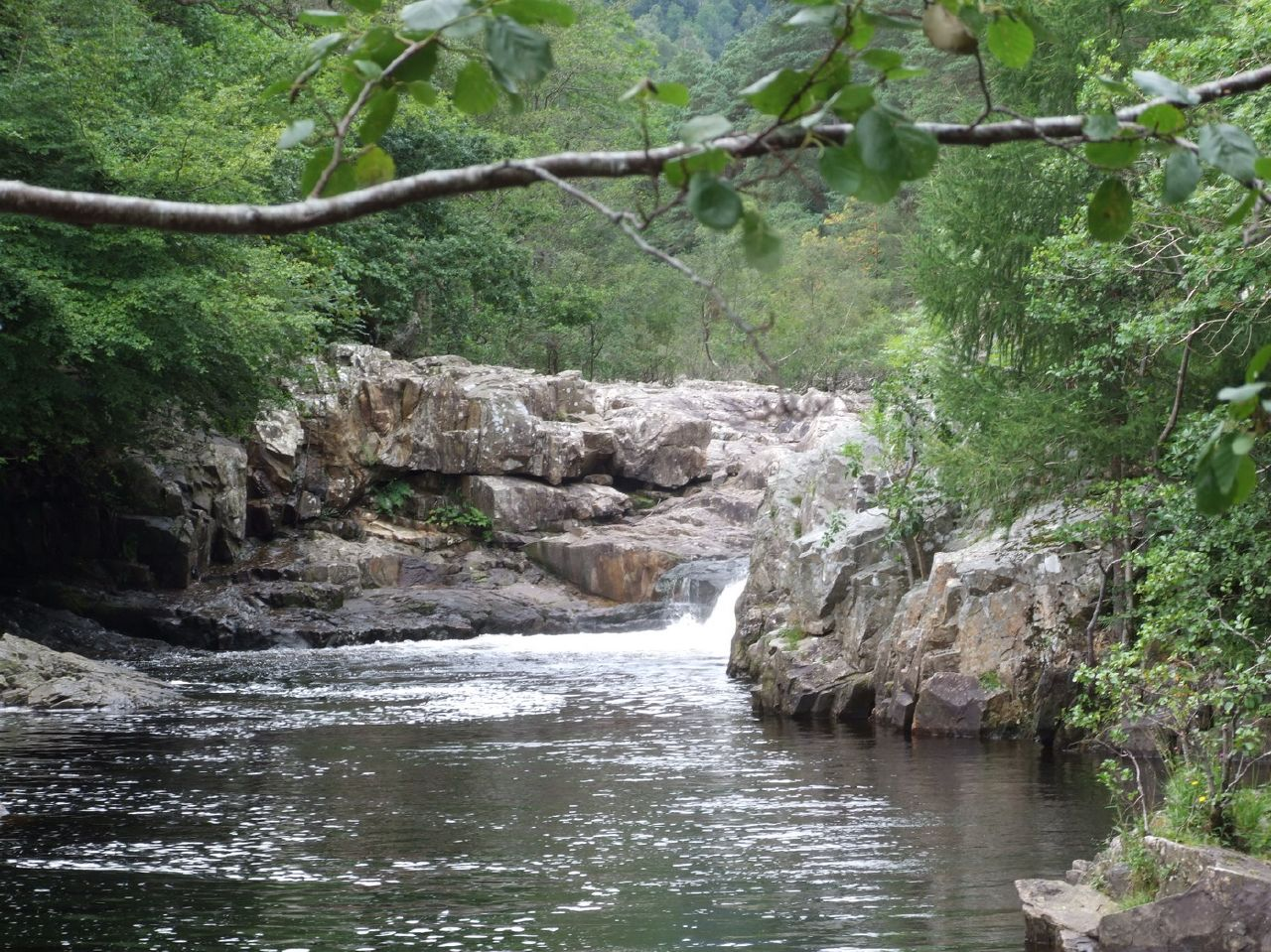
Linn of Tummel

Linn of Tummel is a 19-hectare (47-acre) woodland property at the confluence of the rivers Garry and Tummel, near Pitlochry in Perthshire, Scotland. It is owned and maintained by the National Trust for Scotland, and is adjacent to the Trust's property at Killiecrankie.

The name Linn of Tummel comes from the Scots Gaelic and means "pool of tumbling stream". The name comes from the fact that the River Tummel used to drop down over a fall to meet the River Garry; however, in 1950 the fall ceased when a new hydro-electric plant raised the level of both rivers and created Loch Faskally. In 1910, an early fish pass was blasted through the rock on the northern bank, to allow spawning fish to more easily bypass the falls; however it became obsolete when the Tummel hydro-electric power scheme was built.

The property includes a network of more than 30 miles (48 km) of footpaths, amongst which is an obelisk commemorating the visit of Queen Victoria in 1844. The wildlife include pine martens and otters, while the flora includes pearl-bordered fritillary and lily of the valley.

The National Trust for Scotland have owned the Linn since 1944, when it was given to them by Dr George Freeland Barbour of Bonskeid.
