= Crosstown, Ohio =

Unincorporated community in Ohio, U.S.

Coordinates: 39°05′30″N 84°00′22″W

Crosstown is an unincorporated community in Brown County, in the U.S. state of Ohio.

== History ==
A post office was established at Crosstown in 1881, and remained in operation until 1907.
