= WRAC (FM) =

- Georgetown, Ohio; United States
- Broadcast area: Brown and Adams Counties, and surrounding area
- Frequency: 103.1 MHz
- Branding: C103 Country

Programming
- Format: Country music
- Affiliations: CBS Radio, (NASCAR-Motor Racing Network, PRN Radio) The Ohio State University, Ohio Ag Net

Ownership
- Owner: Dreamcatcher Communications
- Sister stations: WAOL 99.5 FM, Ripley, Ohio, WFLE 95.1 FM, Flemingsburg, Kentucky, WFLE AM, Flemingsburg, Kentucky

History
- Former call signs: WIAO (1981–1981)

Technical information
- Licensing authority: FCC
- Facility ID: 50136
- Class: A
- ERP: 6,000 watts
- HAAT: 100.0 meters
- Transmitter coordinates: 38°52′14.00″N 83°45′55.00″W

Links
- Public license information: Public file; LMS
- Website: http://www.c103.fm

WRAC (103.1 FM) is a radio station broadcasting a country music format. Licensed to Georgetown, Ohio, United States, the station is owned by Dreamcatcher Communications.

== History ==
The station was assigned the call letters WIAO on June 15, 1981. On October 16, 1981 the station changed its call sign to the current WRAC.

WRAC was founded and placed on the air by Virginia Purdy as part of the Ohio River Broadcasting Association (ORBA). The studios started out with its creme and blue colors scheme, in a converted barn/garage on Virginia's personal property in West Union. The transmitter was placed on Spencer Mountain, roughly ten miles west of West Union and one mile north of the pan handle. Gene Bowen (formerly of WURD provided much of the logistical help in getting the station on the air. The studios and transmitter site were furnished with state-of-the-art equipment. The station was one of the first in the area to originate high fidelity remote broadcasts using link backs by transmitter rather than conventional phone lines.

The first primary hosts were Virginia Purdy (morning talk), Gene Bowen (morning drive), Phil Swayne (lunch block), Ted Foster (evenings) and Dan Ramey (afternoons). Jeff Hall and Jeff Scott (King) joined soon afterward. Jeff Hall replacing Dan Ramey afternoons, and Jeff Scott providing engineering support, remote broadcast setup and vacation fill-in support. Jeff Scott later worked stints in morning drive and lunch block.

Gene Bowen, Jeff Hall, and Jeff Scott left successful previous positions at WURD to join WRAC. Gene Bowen, Phil Swayne, Jeff Hall, and Jeff Scott have since left the station to pursue careers outside of radio (Gene Bowen and Phil Swayne have since died).

The station started out playing an eclectic blend of top hits in pop, country, and adult contemporary. Bluegrass segments were later added on the weekend and subsequently to weekday evenings. The station was known for its community involvement stemming primarily from the founders interest in politics. Virginia herself maintained a tight grip on the public persona of the station by banning content that she felt was unacceptable for the public airwaves. At her request, the playing of the song "Jack and Diane" by John Cougar was banned, as one early example. She also hosted regular morning talk segments on relevant topics with the movers and shakers of the area. At her direction, the station, early on known as the bridge across the Ohio, maintained a presence at every festival and celebration in the surrounding Southern Ohio and Northern Kentucky markets. As Virginia became ever more involved in educational politics, her day to day influence and interest in the station began to wane.

Early on, the station had no nickname, at the strict direction of the owner. WRAC was always only referred to as WRAC in jingles and promos; never with any taglines or nicknames. Internally the "RAC" in WRAC was always thought to stand for Radio Adams County. Management felt this too restrictive and never permitted its use on the air. An early "on the air" promotion entitled "Make Maggie Moo" became so popular that when the station was later sold and the format changed to top country, Maggie remained to become the station mascot, and the station is now known as C103 "The Home of the Cow".

Current owners Don and Venita Bowles have operated the station under the parent company DreamCatcher Communications since 1997. WRAC C103 is one of four stations in southern Ohio and northern Kentucky owned and operated by DreamCatcher Communications. The others include - WAOL-FM 99.5 The Edge, licensed to Ripley, OH; WFLE-FM and WFLE-AM out of Flemingsburg, KY.

C103 now plays Top 40 Country plus top hits from the 1980s, 1990s and 2000s. The primary on-air hosts today are Brad Rolfe and Rosie Young (The Brad & Rosie Show). The show has generated very high ratings in the past several years and is now the number one morning show in the area. Longtime afternoon host Ted Foster retired in April 2010. This position was taken over by Matt Hilderbrand in May 2010. Hilderbrand has since become a popular personality in the area. Rolfe and Hilderbrand also share hosting duties of "The Trash and Treasure Trading Post", a long-standing call in show for the station.

In September 2015, the station added a third on-air personality in Brian Elliot. As a result, The Brad and Rosie Show extended to a four-hour show, running from 6am to 10am. Brad Rolfe rounds out the morning show from 10am to 11am. Brian Elliot handles the midday shift from 11am to 4pm. Matt Hilderbrand moved to the afternoon drive slot and is on the air from 4pm to 8pm.

C103 now broadcasts in digital from a new tower and transmitter located in Russelville, Ohio. C103 studios are still located in West Union, Ohio. C103 is not only a country music radio station but also serves the community by broadcasting from area festivals, fairs, community events plus C103 broadcasts high school sports. C103 airs over 150 Southern Hills Athletic Conference basketball games a year, as well as high school baseball and volleyball, Ohio University football, dirt track and NASCAR Sprint Cup racing.

== Programming ==
Weekdays: 6:00 am to 10:00 am - "The Brad and Rosie Show" with Brad Rolfe and Rosie Young; 10:00 to 11 am - Brad Rolfe; 11:00 am to 4:00 pm - Brian Elliott; 4:00pm to 8 pm - Matt Hilderbrand.

Saturdays: 6:00 am to 8:00 am - Matt Hilderbrand; 8:00 am - AutoSmarts Radio Show; 9:00 am - Cowboy Corner Radio Show; 10:00 am to 12:00 noon - Z-Max Racing Country; 12:00 noon to 2:00 pm - Matt Hilderbrand; 2:00 pm to 4:00 pm - NASCAR USA Radio Show; 4:00 pm to 7:00 pm - Matt Hilderbrand; 7:00 pm to 9:00 pm - Z-Max Racing Country Radio Show; 9:00 pm to 11:00 pm - NASCAR USA Radio Show.

C103 SHAC Sports Team: Don Bowles, Ken Smith, Ben Higgins, Matt Hilderbrand, Brett Spencer, Carl Schneider, Phil Rhonemus, Bruce Wallace, Trent Harrop, and David Tatman.

Dirt Track Racing Team: Kyle Wainscott, Josh Jewell, and Connie McDonald.
