= White Oak Valley, Ohio =

Unincorporated community in Ohio, U.S.

Coordinates: 38°55′12″N 83°55′37″W

White Oak Valley is an unincorporated community in Brown County, in the U.S. state of Ohio.

== History ==
A post office called White Oak Valley was established in 1848, and remained in operation until 1860. The community was named for the valley of nearby White Oak Creek.
