= Eastwood, Ohio =

Unincorporated community in Ohio, U.S.

Coordinates: 39°02′56″N 83°59′05″W

Eastwood is an unincorporated community in Brown County, in the U.S. state of Ohio.

== History ==
A post office called Eastwood was established in 1876, and remained in operation until 1935. The former railroad depot there was called Salem Station.
