= John W. McCormick =

American politician

John Watts McCormick
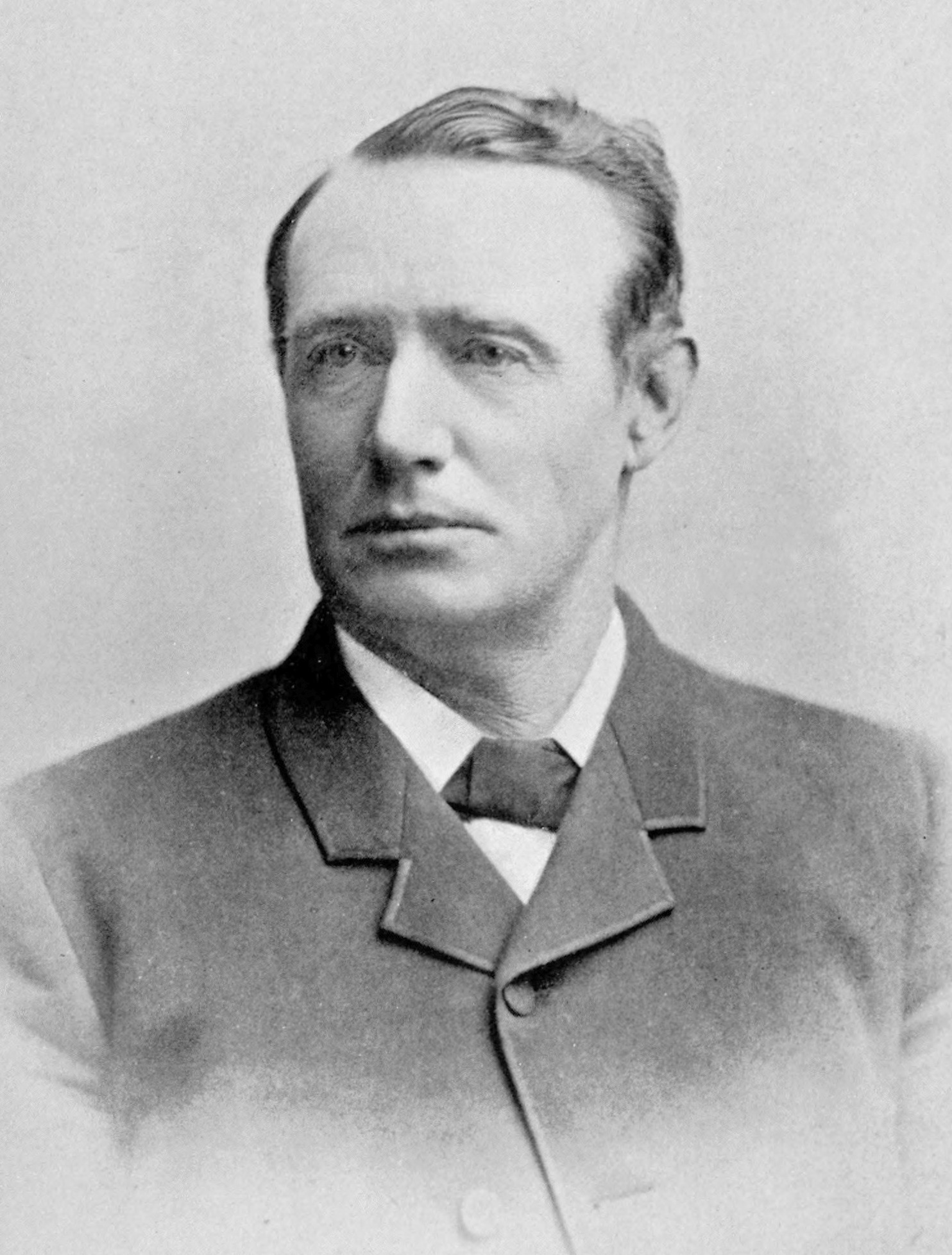

Member of the U.S. House of Representatives from Ohio's 11th district
- In office March 4, 1883 – March 3, 1885
- Preceded by: Henry S. Neal
- Succeeded by: William W. Ellsberry

Personal details
- Born: December 20, 1831 Gallipolis, Ohio, US
- Died: June 25, 1917 (aged 85) Gallipolis, Ohio, US
- Resting place: Mount Zion Cemetery
- Party: Republican
- Spouse(s): Caroline Miles; Sarah Miles
- Education: Ohio Wesleyan University; Ohio University

John Watts McCormick (December 20, 1831 – June 25, 1917) was an American politician who served one term as a U.S. representative from Ohio from 1883 to 1885,

== Biography ==
Born near Gallipolis, Ohio, he was the son of John R. and Sarah Wadell McCormick. McCormick attended Ohio Wesleyan University in Delaware, Ohio, and Ohio University at Athens. He engaged in agricultural pursuits and stock raising. He taught school and later became a Methodist minister. He served as a delegate to the Ohio constitutional convention in 1873.

=== Congress ===
McCormick was elected as a Republican to the Forty-eighth Congress (March 4, 1883 – March 3, 1885). He was an unsuccessful candidate for reelection in 1884 to the Forty-ninth Congress. Trustee of Rio Grande College 1883-1885.

=== Later career and death ===
He resumed agricultural pursuits. He died in Gallipolis, Ohio, June 25, 1917. He was interred in Mount Zion Cemetery near Gallipolis, Ohio.

He married first to Caroline Miles, and later to Sarah Miles.

U.S. House of Representatives
Preceded by Henry S. Neal	Member of the U.S. House of Representatives from Ohio's 11th congressional district March 4, 1883 – March 3, 1885	Succeeded by William W. Ellsberry
