= Arnhem (disambiguation) =

Arnhem is a city and municipality in the Netherlands.

Arnhem may also refer to:

- Vitesse Arnhem, a Dutch Football (soccer) club
- Arnhem Land, the northeastern region and Aboriginal Land Council of the Northern Territory, Australia
- Arnhem (ship), a 17th-century Dutch vessel
- Arnhem Highway, in the Northern Territory, Australia, between Jabiru and Darwin
- Electoral division of Arnhem, an electoral division in the Northern Territory Legislative Assembly, Australia
- Battle of Arnhem, a World War II Allied military operation of 1944
- Arnhem (video game), a battle strategy game based on the Battle of Arnhem
- Arnhem, a typeface designed by Fred Smeijers in 1998

== See also ==
- Arnheim (disambiguation)
