= New Harmony, Ohio =

Unincorporated community in Ohio, U.S.

Coordinates: 39°00′49″N 84°00′44″W

New Harmony is an unincorporated community in Brown County, in the U.S. state of Ohio.

== History ==
New Harmony was laid out in 1847. A post office called New Harmony was established in 1851, and remained in operation until 1907.
