= Brownstown, Brown County, Ohio =

Unincorporated community in Ohio, U.S.

Coordinates: 38°58′12″N 83°50′25″W

Brownstown is an unincorporated community in Brown County, in the U.S. state of Ohio.

== History ==
Brownstown was platted in 1848. A post office was established at Brownstown in 1876 and remained in operation until 1905.
