= Wahlsburg, Ohio =

Unincorporated community in Ohio, U.S.

Coordinates: 38°54′49″N 83°54′10″W

Wahlsburg is an unincorporated community in Brown County, in the U.S. state of Ohio.

== History ==
A post office was established at Wahlsburg in 1879, and remained in operation until 1903. The community was named for Peter Wahl, the first postmaster.
