= Chasetown, Ohio =

Unincorporated community in Ohio, U.S.

Coordinates: 39°09′38″N 83°55′55″W

Chasetown is an unincorporated community in Brown County, Ohio.

== History ==
A post office called Chasetown was established in 1889, and remained in operation until 1905. Tradition states the community was so named on account of unfriendly neighbors who chased newcomers away.
