= Vera Cruz, Ohio =

Unincorporated community in Ohio, U.S.

Coordinates: 39°10′19″N 83°57′45″W

Vera Cruz is an unincorporated community in Brown County, in the U.S. state of Ohio.

It is the location of the McCafferty Road Covered Bridge.

== History ==
A post office was established at Vera Cruz in 1872, and remained in operation until 1905. The community was named in commemoration of the Siege of Veracruz in the Mexican–American War.
