= Hiett, Ohio =

Unincorporated community in Ohio, U.S.

Coordinates: 38°43′17″N 83°43′25″W

Hiett is an unincorporated community in Brown County, in the U.S. state of Ohio.

== History ==
A post office called Hiett was established in 1872, and remained in operation until 1903. Besides the post office, Hiett had a church and several stores.
