= Fort Fincastle =

Fort Fincastle may refer to:

- Fort Henry (West Virginia), formerly called Fort Fincastle
- Fort Fincastle (Bahamas)
