= Redoak, Ohio =

Unincorporated community in Ohio, U.S.

Coordinates: 38°48′23″N 83°47′32″W

Redoak is an unincorporated community in Brown County, in the U.S. state of Ohio.

== History ==
A post office called Red Oak was established in 1865, and remained in operation until 1903. Besides the post office, Redoak had several country stores.
