= Ash Ridge, Ohio =

Unincorporated community in Ohio, U.S.

Coordinates: 38°54′29″N 83°45′31″W

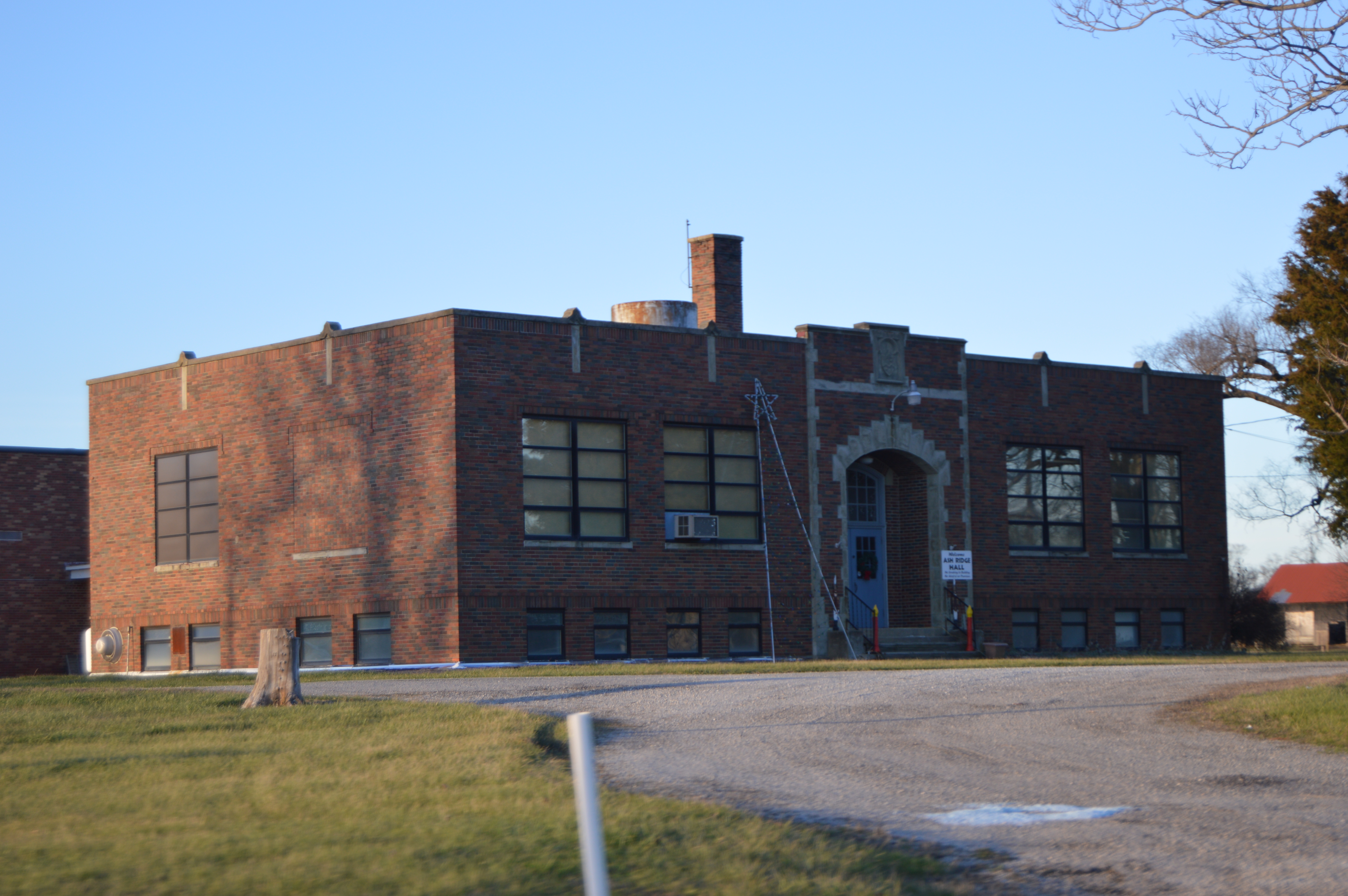
Community center on U.S. Route 62, formerly a school

Ash Ridge is an unincorporated community in Brown County, in the U.S. state of Ohio.

== History ==
Ash Ridge was originally called Carlisle, and under the latter name was platted in 1834. A post office called Ash Ridge was established in 1846, and remained in operation until 1906.
