= Michael Arnheim =

British author and barrister

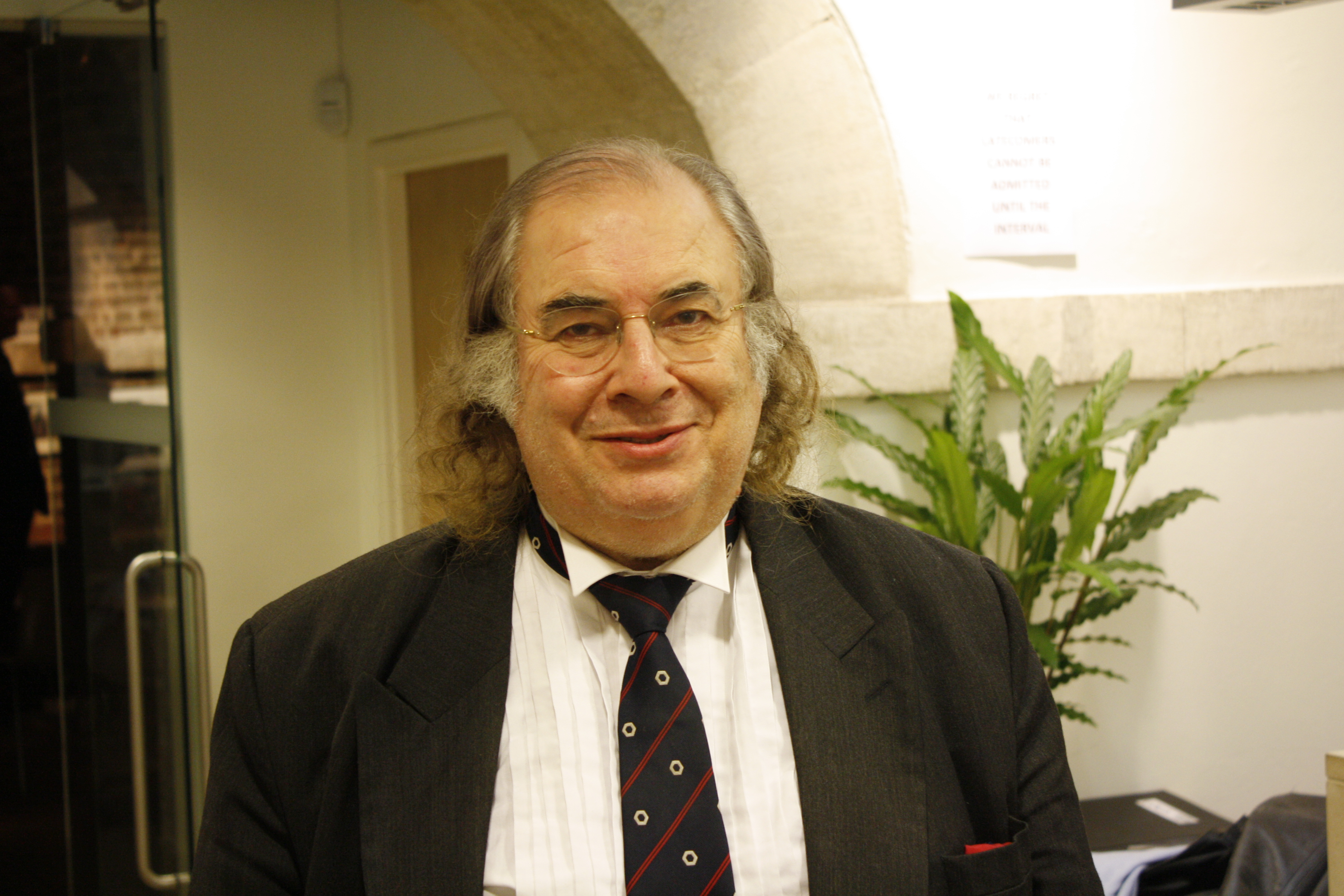
- Michael Arnheim in 2011
- Born: 24 March 1944; Johannesburg, Transvaal Province, South Africa
- Died: 15 September 2026 (aged 82)
- Citizenship: British
- Education: University of the Witwatersrand Cambridge University (St John's College)
- Occupations: Barrister, Former Fellow, Author
- Years active: 1969–present

Michael Thomas Walter Arnheim (also known as "Doctor Mike"; born 24 March 1944; died 15 September 2026) was a practising London barrister and author. He wrote 26 books, including most recently the philosophical work, The God Book, and political works, Two Models of Government and Anglo-American Law: A Comparison. Previously published books include The Handbook of Human Rights Law, Principles of the Common Law, The U.S. Constitution for Dummies (part of Wiley's For Dummies series), and The Problem with Human Rights Law.

== Early life and education ==
As a 14-year-old student at King Edward VII School in Johannesburg, Arnheim was picked to join the "Quiz Kids" team, appearing on South Africa's Springbok Radio. He entered Johannesburg's University of the Witwatersrand at 16, received his B.A. in History and Classics 3 years later, and an M.A. at the age of 21.

He then went to St John's College, Cambridge on a National Scholarship. Besides his academic pursuits he engaged in student politics, being elected a member of the Junior Combination Room committee and College NUS secretary. He captained the college's University Challenge team. Arnheim had as his Ph.D. supervisor A.H.M. ("Hugo") Jones, then Cambridge Professor of Ancient History, and John Crook as his college mentor, who was to occupy the position of Professor of Ancient History later on.

== Career ==
In 1969, at the age of 25, Arnheim was awarded his Cambridge Ph.D. His doctoral dissertation was The Senatorial Aristocracy in the Later Roman Empire. Arnheim was elected a Fellow of St John's College, Cambridge, where he taught while researching his next book, Aristocracy in Greek Society (1977), which he was invited by Professor Howard Hayes Scullard to write as part of the Thames & Hudson series, Aspects of Greek and Roman Life.

At the age of 31 Arnheim was invited to take up the position of full Professor and Head of the Department of Classics back at his old university in South Africa. During this time he devised a new system of learning Latin, which he would later integrate into a new approach to the learning of European languages in general. In 1979 he published South Africa after Vorster, which predicted that the alternative to White rule was not a shared-power democracy between Blacks and Whites, but rule by a Black oligarchy at the expense of Whites and ordinary Blacks alike.

Arnheim's next book, Is Christianity True? (1984), was translated into several languages, including Spanish. Through examination of historical evidence the book asserted that most Christian beliefs about Jesus were untrue. One review wrote:

Not many professional students of the NT believe that the Gospels are intended to be straight history or biography in the modern sense. Rather are they usually seen as theologically coloured, written by those who take Jesus Christ as the centre of their universe and who present us with what is essentially proclamation. Professor Michael Arnheim of the University of the Witwatersrand thinks this is entirely wrong; Christians ought to take the gospels au pied de la lettre, and then face some highly inconvenient facts: Jesus did not literally fulfil Jewish expectations of the Messiah and so was not the Messiah; many of the stories about him are plainly false or internally inconsistent; he himself does not exemplify the humility and above all the love even of enemies that he demanded; his ethical teaching is so unrealistic that it was bound to make Christians into the hypocrites that they are.

Arnheim was invited to address Professor Henry Chadwick's Patristics seminar in the Cambridge Divinity School.

Despondent about the future of South Africa, Arnheim returned to Britain, where he was called to the Bar by Lincoln's Inn in 1988, and went into practice as a London barrister specializing in civil litigation, with a certain amount of criminal defence on the side, notably the Cardiff Prison Riot trial in 1992. Arnheim was an early voice in the legal profession to adamantly insist that a person could face criminal liability for knowingly concealing their HIV-positive status from a sexual partner. His civil law practice has been largely in the field of commercial litigation including some international litigation as of counsel to Brown & Welsh P.C. of Meriden, Connecticut.

From early on in his practice at the Bar, Arnheim wrote articles in favor of clients' being allowed to come direct to a barrister, thus avoiding the additional expense of having to be referred by a solicitor. The idea was only taken up in 2000 in a report by the Director of Fair Trading, Sir John Vickers. Arnheim was one of the first barristers to register for direct public access when this was eventually allowed in 2004. Arnheim has also written extensively on other legal topics, ranging from court procedure to the common law, constitutional law, judicial power and human rights.

== Views ==
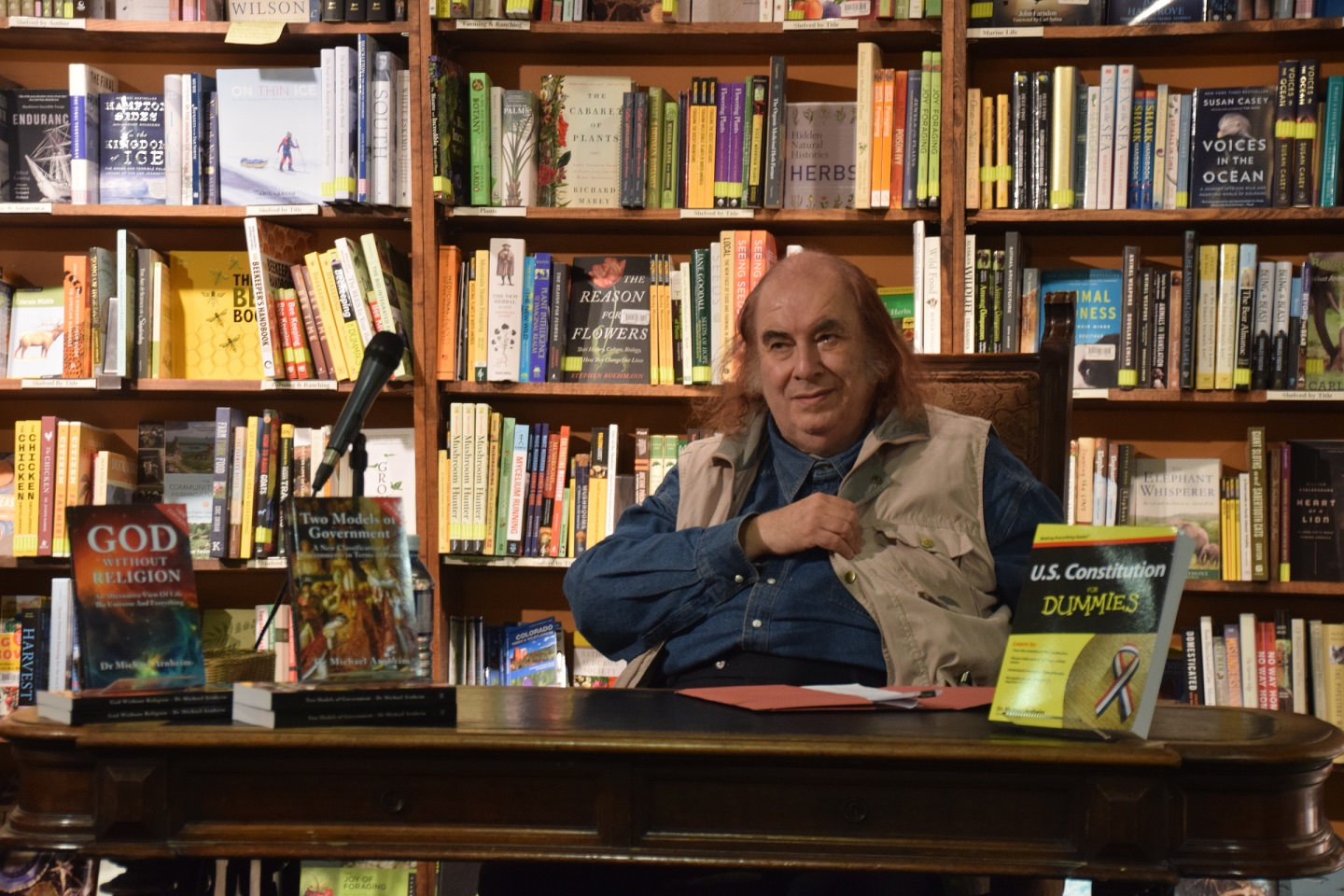
Arnheim at a book-signing at the Tattered Cover Bookstore, Denver, Colorado, in September, 2016.

=== Religion ===
The God Book (2015), a sequel to Is Christianity True? (1984), is a critique of atheism and conventional religion alike. The book argues that atheism and conventional religion are both deficient in credibility as well as in toleration. Arnheim prefers Deism, or the belief in an impersonal God who does not get involved in the day-to-day affairs of the world.

Arnheim additionally authored an article entitled "God Without Religion" for publication in Pandeism: An Anthology (2017).

=== History and politics ===
Arnheim's Cambridge Ph.D. thesis, The Senatorial Aristocracy in the Later Roman Empire, offered a new explanation of the "decline and fall" of the Roman Empire in the West. Arnheim contended that the reason the Western Empire fell was that the central government in the West was sapped from within by the senatorial aristocracy, who now again dominated the top administrative posts while building up their own countervailing local power through the spread of large estates. As a result, the central government proved unable to withstand the "barbarian" incursions. The same rise of the senatorial aristocracy did not occur in the Eastern half of the Empire, which therefore survived for another thousand years, albeit in a gradually shrinking state.

This analysis itself was based on a new theory about the essential nature of governmental power, namely that there are and have ever been essentially only two models of government: (a) where power is concentrated in the hands of a minority, whether hereditary or not; and (b) where power is concentrated in the hands of a single individual. This analysis was also the subject of Aristocracy in Greek Society (1977). The same model was then tested and found to apply to modern history and the present-day world as well. This is the theme of Two Models of Government, published in 2016. His 2020 book, Gateway English, seeks to show how English can be used as a gateway to learning other languages through etymological links. His 2022 book, Why Rome Fell, was reviewed in Bryn Mawr Classical Review as "a useful [thesis] both to contemplate and qualify". The book argues that the transformation of Rome was driven less by decay than by the empire's conversion from a tolerant communal religion to the exclusivist creed of Christianity, and by Constantine's fusion of monarchical authority with a serviceable aristocratic elite that shaped both the Byzantine and post-Roman political order.

In Five Thousand Years of Monarchy, Arnheim offers a reinterpretation of recorded history through the lens of power structure, suggesting that, regardless of labels, there are and always have been only two essential types of government: monarchy and oligarchy. Arnheim argues, for example, that Periclean democracy was actually a monarchy, while modern democracies are really oligarchies. Arnheim further seeks to demonstrate that power structure is also relevant to other features of the societies concerned, such as stability, liberty, equality and foreign policy, as well as to the social and political ethos of those societies. A review of this book was also published in Bryn Mawr Classical Review, with the reviewer, Stefan Rebenich, stating that:

The difficulty is that contemporary preferences occasionally appear to determine historical judgements rather than emerge from them. Strong rulers who confront entrenched elites are consistently viewed with sympathy. Representative institutions are treated with scepticism. Popular support acquires an almost talismanic significance. The reader may occasionally wonder whether the real subject of the book is not monarchy at all, but a sustained dissatisfaction with the political institutions of the contemporary West.

=== Law ===
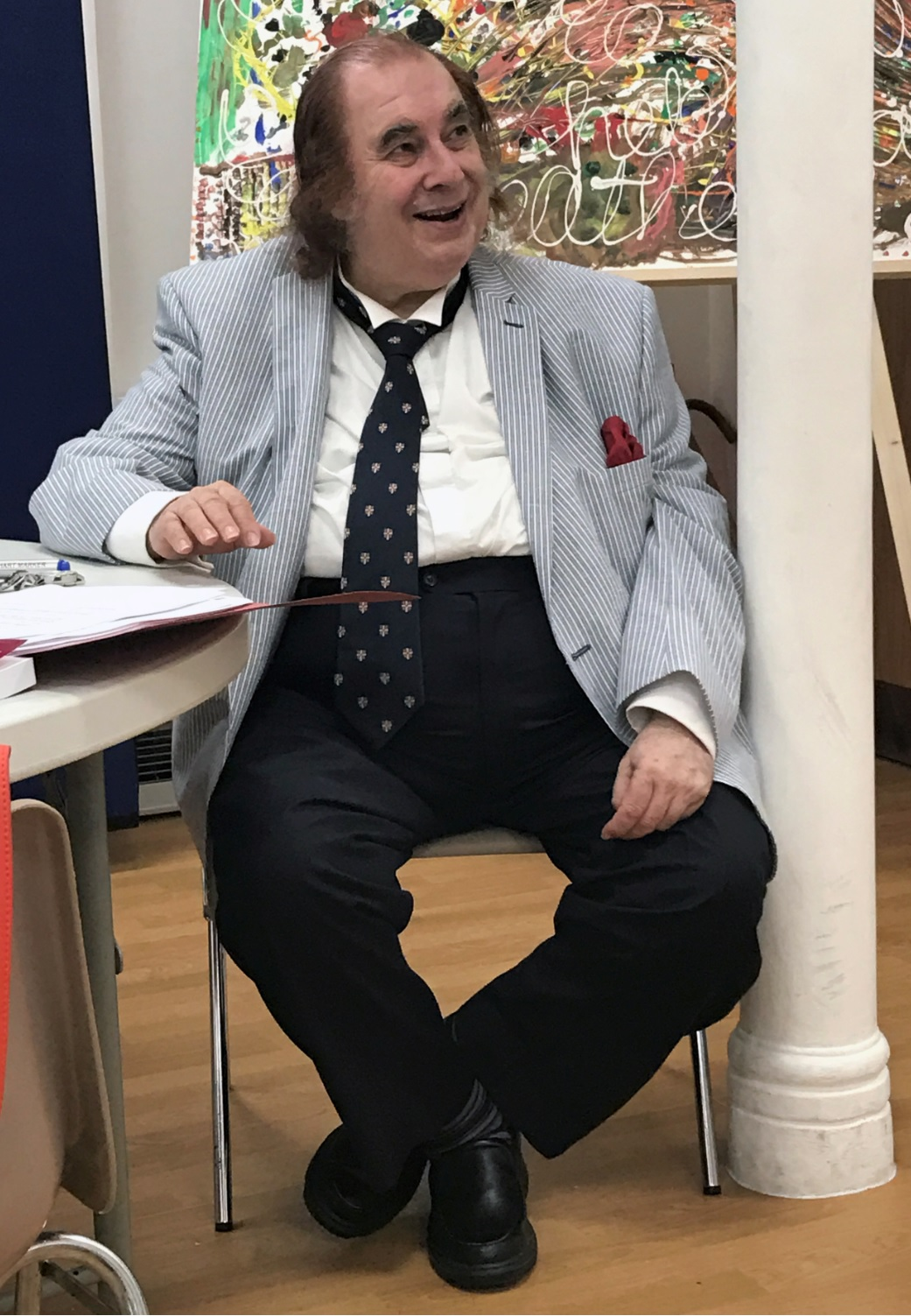
Arnheim in 2017

In 1994 Arnheim was invited to edit a volume of essays on the Common Law in the Dartmouth series, and published in the US by New York University Press. This book was followed up by Principles of the Common Law (2004).

Arnheim was invited by Butterworths to write a book on the drafting of settlement agreements: Drafting Settlements of Disputes: A Guide for Litigators (1994). In 2000 he was asked by Butterworths to write (together with District Judge Christopher Tromans) a guide to the new procedural rules that had just been introduced: Civil Courts Practice and Procedure Handbook.

He wrote the book Handbook of Human Rights Law, which was published by Kogan Page in 2004.

Arnheim wrote U.S. Constitution for Dummies (2009) as part of the For Dummies series of books. To accommodate Arnheim's own opinions the publishers created two new icons, one for "In my Opinion" and the other for "Controversy". The Foreword for the first edition was written by Senator Ted Cruz. The Foreword is omitted from the second edition.

== Bibliography ==
=== Books ===
- History of St John's College, Cambridge, St John's College, 1968
- The Senatorial Aristocracy in the Later Roman Empire, Oxford University Press, 1972.
- The Study of a Civilization, Witwatersrand University Press, 1976.
- The Adventures of Marcus, University of the Witwatersand, 1976
- Aristocracy in Greek Society (Aspects of Greek and Roman Life), Thames & Hudson, 1977.
- South Africa after Vorster, Howard Timmins, 1979.
- Is Christianity True? Gerald Duckworth, 1984.
- Arnheim's Answer: Secret of Student Success, Elliot Right Way Books, 1986.
- Drafting Settlements of Disputes, Tolley, 1994.
- The Common Law (International Library of Essays in Law and Legal Theory), Dartmouth, 1994.
- Civil Courts Practice and Procedure Handbook (with District Judge Christopher Tromans), Butterworth, 1999.
- Principles of the Common Law, Gerald Duckworth, 2004.
- The Handbook of Human Rights Law, Kogan Page, 2004.
- U.S. Constitution for Dummies, John Wiley, 2009; 2nd edition 2018.
- The God Book, Imprint Academic, 2015.
- The Problem with Human Rights Law, Civitas, 2015.
- Two Models of Government: A New Classification in Terms of Power, Societas, Imprint Academic, 2016.
- "God Without Religion," in Pandeism: An Anthology, 2017.
- God Without Religion: An Alternative View of Life, the Universe & Everything, Black House Publishing, 2016.
- A Practical Guide to Your Human Rights and Civil Liberties ("Straightforward Guide to" series), Straightforward Publishing, 2017.
- U.S. Constitution for Dummies, 2nd edition, John Wiley & Sons, 2018.
- Anglo-American Law: A Comparison, The Lawbook Exchange (Talbot Publishing), 2019.
- Gateway English: How to Boost your English Word Power and Unlock New Languages, Halifax. UK: LinguaBooks, 2020.
- Why Rome Fell: Decline and Fall, or Drift and Change?, New York: Wiley-Blackwell, 2022.
- Five Thousand Years of Monarchy, New York, Wiley-Blackwell, 2025.
- Three Pillars of Wisdom: The True Nature of Government, Religion and Law, Academica Press, Washington, 2026.

=== Other writings ===
Journal articles

- "A conspiracy too far?" New Law Journal (August 17, 2018)
- "Lord Neuberger's salutary warning", New Law Journal (November 9, 2018)
- "The gay wedding cake saga", New Law Journal (December 7, 2018)
- "Monarchs, judges & controversial Prime Ministers", New Law Journal (October 3, 2019)
- "Don't blame the judges", New Law Journal (January 24, 2020)

Blogs

- Huffington Post page for Dr Arnheim
  - "My Challenge to Richard Dawkins and Jonathan Sacks: Why Both Atheists And Religious People Are Wrong", Huffington Post, Posted: 20/10/2015 17:36 BST Updated: 20/10/2015 17:59 BST
  - "Niall Ferguson's Droll Parallel Between the Paris Terrorist Attack and the Fall of Rome", Huffington Post (November 26, 2015)
  - "The Brexit Referendum - Joke Letter From 1,054 Barristers", Huffington Post (July 12, 2016)
