= Sardinia, Ohio =

- Village
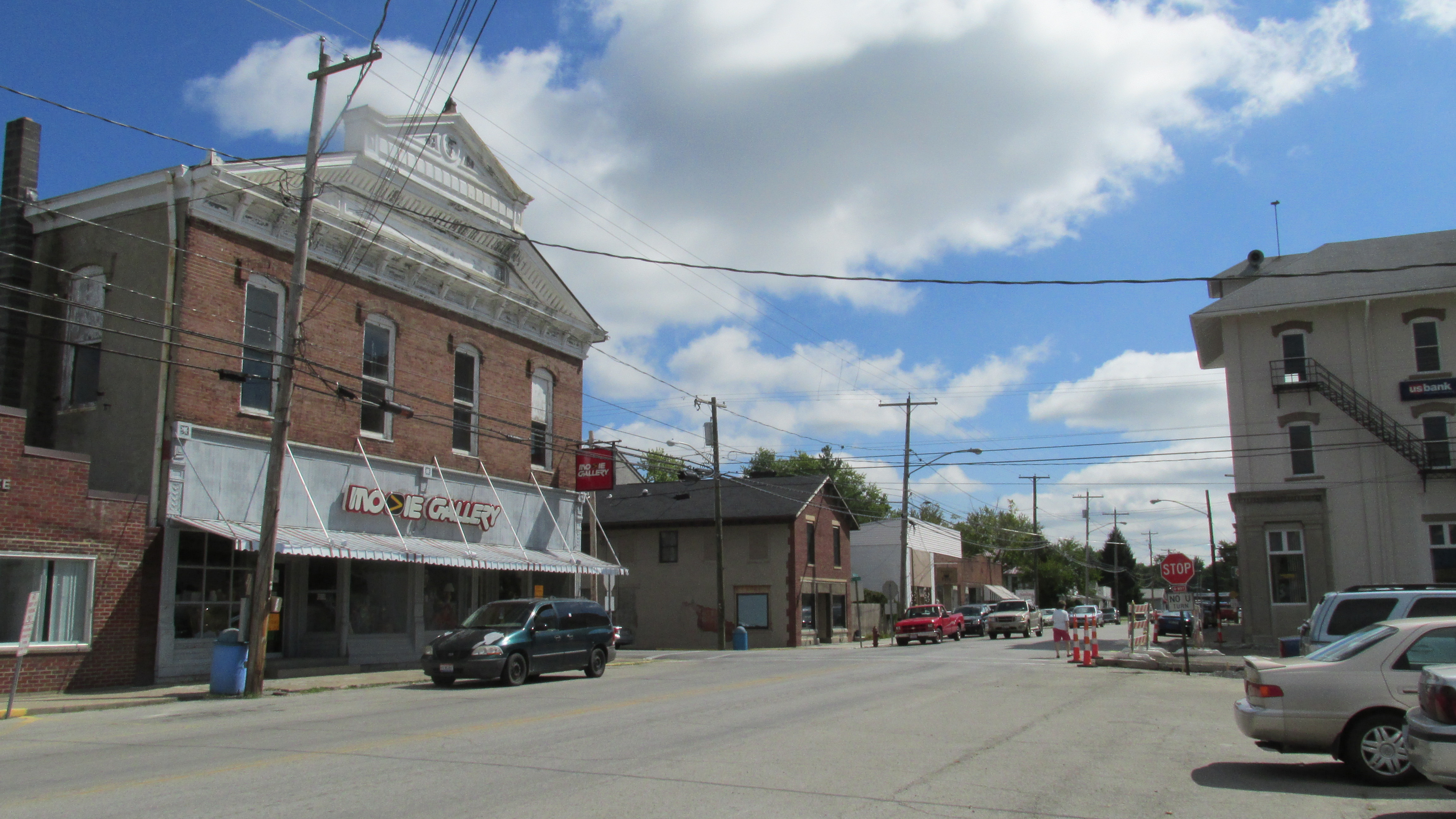
- Looking east at the intersection of Broadway Street and Main Street (Ohio State Route 134) in Sardinia

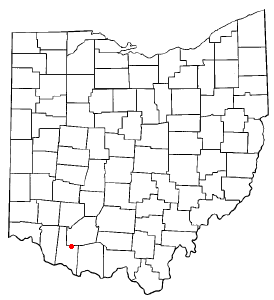
- Location of Sardinia, Ohio

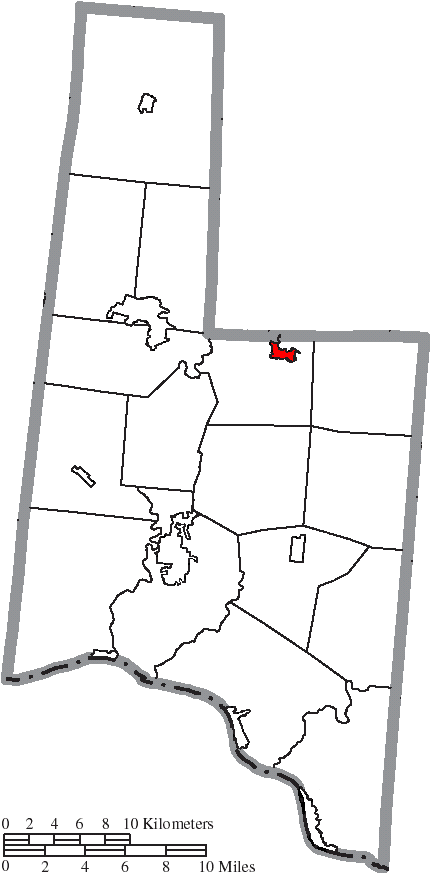
- Location of Sardinia in Brown County
- Coordinates: 39°00′16″N 83°48′14″W
- Country: United States
- State: Ohio
- Counties: Brown, Highland

Government
  - Mayor: Dusty Puckett

Area
  - Total: 1.75 sq mi (4.54 km^{2})
  - Land: 1.75 sq mi (4.54 km^{2})
  - Water: 0 sq mi (0.00 km^{2})
- Elevation: 961 ft (293 m)

Population (2020)
  - Total: 1,083
  - Density: 617.4/sq mi (238.37/km^{2})
- Time zone: UTC-5 (Eastern (EST))
  - Summer (DST): UTC-4 (EDT)
- ZIP code: 45171
- Area codes: 937, 326
- FIPS code: 39-70534
- GNIS feature ID: 2399185
- Website: villageofsardinia.com

Sardinia is a village in Brown and Highland counties in the U.S. state of Ohio. The population was 1,083 at the 2020 census.

== History ==
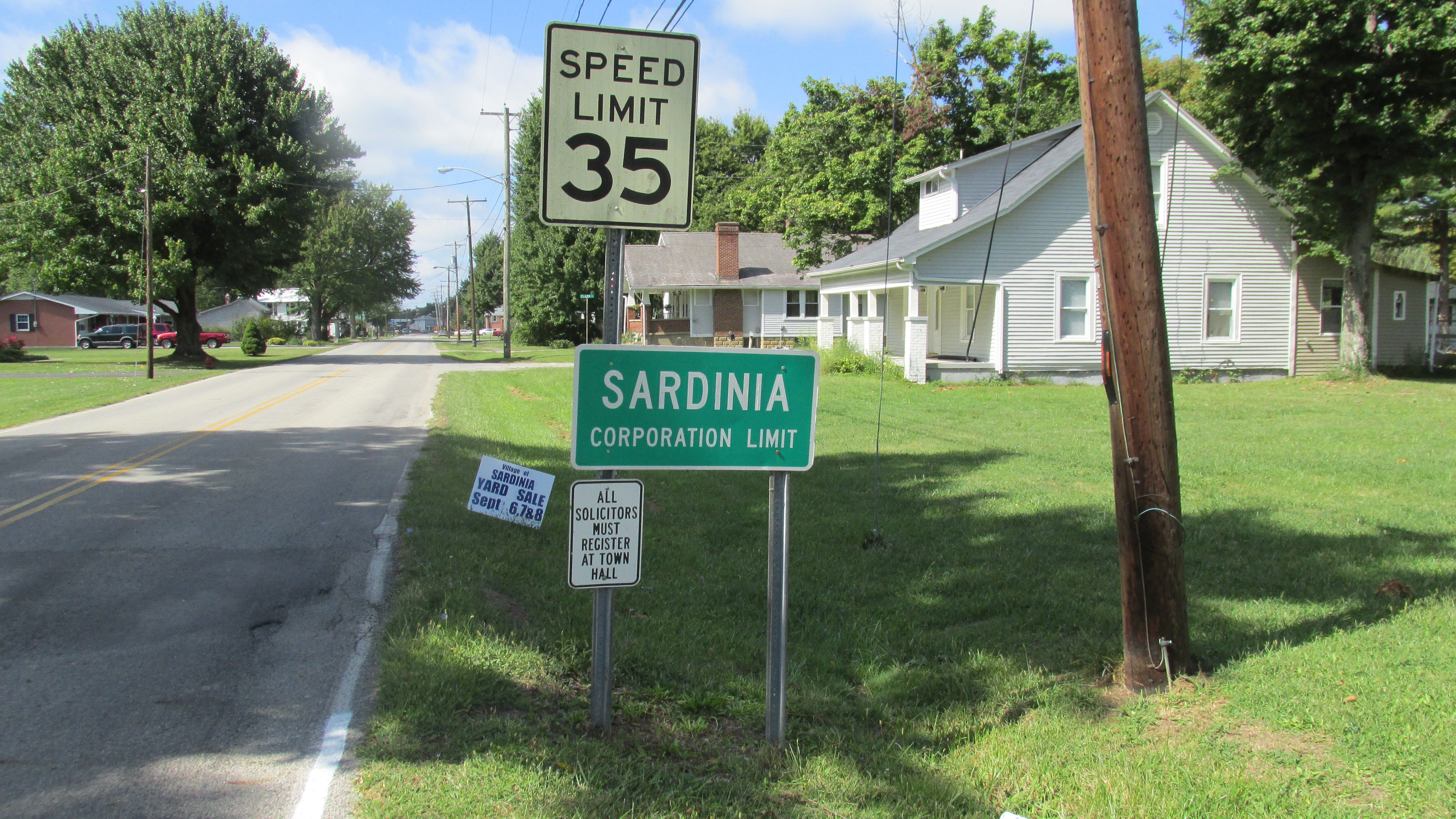
Sardinia corporation limit sign

Sardinia was laid out in 1833. The village's name is derived from a methodist hymnal popular during the 1840's. Historically, Sardinia was a post village of Brown County, in Washington township, established in 1830, situated on the east fork of White Oak Creek, 12 miles (19 km) north-east of Georgetown, and 44 miles (71 km) east of Cincinnati. In 1860, Sardinia's population was 200 and Washington Township had a population of 1,300. It was a station on the Cincinnati & Eastern Railroad, today the Cincinnati Eastern Railroad (CCET).

== Geography ==
Sardinia is located mostly in Washington Township in Brown County, and partly in Clay Township in southwestern Highland County.

According to the United States Census Bureau, the village has a total area of 1.24 square miles (3.21 km^{2}), all land.

== Demographics ==
Historical population
Census	Pop.	Note	%±
1850	198		—
1880	283		—
1910	534		—
1920	561		5.1%
1930	564		0.5%
1940	615		9.0%
1950	699		13.7%
1960	799		14.3%
1970	824		3.1%
1980	826		0.2%
1990	792		−4.1%
2000	862		8.8%
2010	980		13.7%
2020	1,083		10.5%
U.S. Decennial Census

Sardinia first appeared on the 1850 U.S. Census with a recorded population of 198.

=== 2010 census ===
As of the census of 2010, there were 980 people, 363 households, and 259 families living in the village. The population density was 790.3 inhabitants per square mile (305.1/km^{2}). There were 416 housing units at an average density of 335.5 per square mile (129.5/km^{2}). The racial makeup of the village was 99.2% White, 0.2% African American, 0.3% Native American, 0.1% from other races, and 0.2% from two or more races. Hispanic or Latino of any race were 0.3% of the population.

There were 363 households, of which 44.9% had children under the age of 18 living with them, 42.1% were married couples living together, 21.5% had a female householder with no husband present, 7.7% had a male householder with no wife present, and 28.7% were non-families. 24.0% of all households were made up of individuals, and 8.6% had someone living alone who was 65 years of age or older. The average household size was 2.67 and the average family size was 3.07.

The median age in the village was 31 years. 33.1% of residents were under the age of 18; 8.1% were between the ages of 18 and 24; 28.6% were from 25 to 44; 20.3% were from 45 to 64; and 9.9% were 65 years of age or older. The gender makeup of the village was 46.3% male and 53.7% female.

=== 2000 census ===
As of the census of 2000, there were 862 people, 328 households, and 230 families living in the village. The population density was 1,343.8 inhabitants per square mile (518.8/km^{2}). There were 362 housing units at an average density of 564.3 per square mile (217.9/km^{2}). The racial makeup of the village was 98.61% White, 0.23% Black or African American, and 1.16% from two or more races. Hispanic or Latino of any race were 0.93% of the population.

There were 328 households, out of which 40.5% had children under the age of 18 living with them, 51.5% were married couples living together, 13.4% had a female householder with no husband present, and 29.6% were non-families. 26.8% of all households were made up of individuals, and 13.7% had someone living alone who was 65 years of age or older. The average household size was 2.54 and the average family size was 3.06.

In the village, the population was spread out, with 29.0% under the age of 18, 9.5% from 18 to 24, 31.7% from 25 to 44, 17.3% from 45 to 64, and 12.5% who were 65 years of age or older. The median age was 31 years. For every 100 females there were 87.8 males. For every 100 females age 18 and over, there were 81.1 males.

The median income for a household in the village was $28,897, and the median income for a family was $32,708. Males had a median income of $34,375 versus $18,056 for females. The per capita income for the village was $12,334. About 15.4% of families and 20.1% of the population were well above the poverty line, including 24.2% of those under age 18 and 14.3% of those age 65 or over.

== Education ==
The village is served by Eastern High School. Sardinia has a public library, a branch of the Brown County Public Library.
