= Arnheim, Ohio =

Unincorporated community in Ohio, U.S.

Coordinates: 38°56′00″N 83°49′39″W

Arnheim is an unincorporated community in Brown County, in the U.S. state of Ohio.

== History ==
Arnheim was laid out in 1837, and named for Jacob Arn, the original owner of the town site (Arnheim meaning "Arn's home" in German). A post office was established at Arnheim in 1839, and remained in operation until 1910.
