= Fincastle, Ohio =

Unincorporated community in Ohio

Coordinates: 38°59′30″N 83°42′53″W

Fincastle is an unincorporated community in Brown County, in the U.S. state of Ohio.

== History ==
Fincastle was platted in 1835, and named after Fincastle, Virginia. A post office called Fincastle was established in 1836, and remained in operation until 1967.
