= Fincastle Chapel =

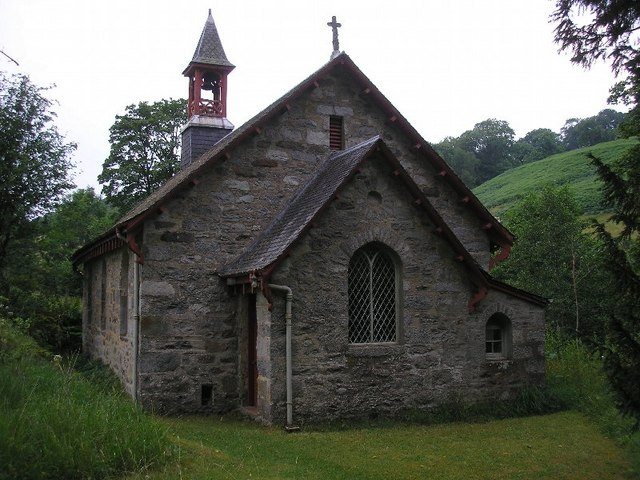
- The chapel in 2006, looking northwest
- Fincastle Chapel
- 56°43′41″N 3°49′40″W
- Location: Blair Atholl, Perth and Kinross
- Country: Scotland

Architecture
- Completed: 1843 (183 years ago)

Fincastle Chapel, also known as Glenfincastle Chapel, is a former church building in Glen Fincastle, 2.6 miles (4.2 km) south of Blair Atholl, Perth and Kinross, Scotland. It is named for the glen in which it stands.

Standing at the apex of a hairpin curve of the B8019 Killiecrankie-to-Tummel Bridge road, where the road crosses Fincastle Burn, the chapel is believed to have been built in 1843, according to a datestone at the site. Inside the chapel there is a World War I memorial plaque honouring five local men who died in the conflict.

Another plaque is to the memory of Charlotte Rachel Barbour (née Fowler), who was a "friend of the children of Glen Fincastle 1930". Charlotte's son, George Freeland Barbour (1882–1946), was for many years a worshipper and preacher at the chapel. A tablet was placed, to give thanks, by the family of Helen Victoria Barbour (1891–1982): "For 63 years her home in this glen was a place of laughter, joy and inspiration for countless people from far and near."

The chapel is shown as a free church on the first-edition Ordnance Survey maps, and as a school on the second edition.

An octagonal wooden structure, which is not shown on the early maps, stands to the southeast of the chapel.

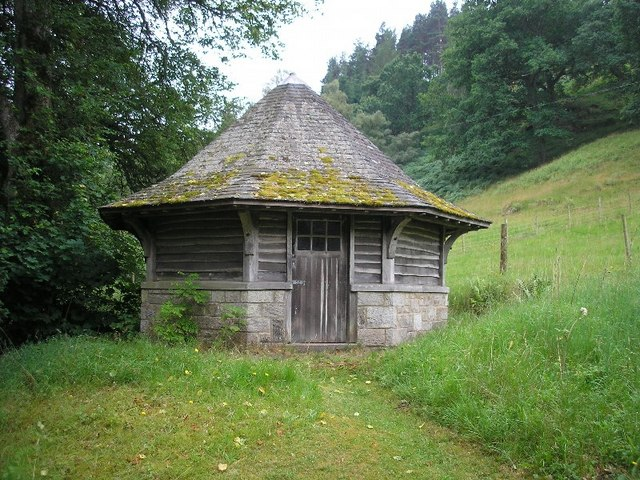
The octagonal structure beside the chapel

== Robert Stewart ==
The burial enclosure of Robert Stewart, 11th of Fincastle (1756–1822), is located 0.5 miles (0.80 km) south of the chapel, and is a Category C listed structure.
