= New Hope, Brown County, Ohio =

Unincorporated community in Ohio, U.S.

Coordinates: 38°57′50″N 83°54′45″W

New Hope is an unincorporated community in Brown County, in the U.S. state of Ohio.

== History ==
A post office called New Hope was established in 1828, and remained in operation until 1893. An outbreak of cholera in 1849 decimated the town's population.
