= Brown County, Ohio =

County in Ohio, United States

- County
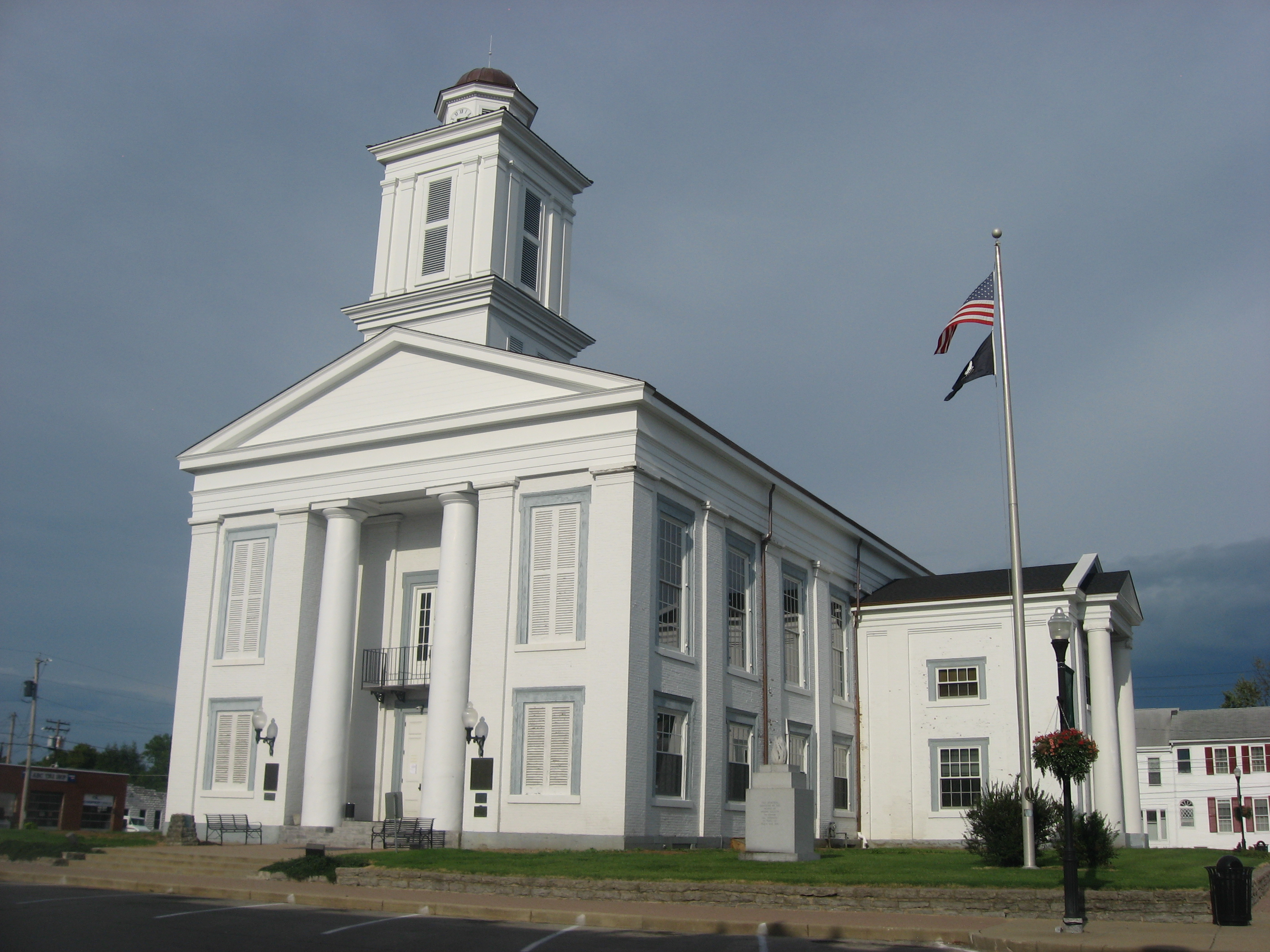
- Brown County Courthouse

- Flag Seal

- Location within the U.S. state of Ohio
- Coordinates: 38°56′N 83°52′W
- Country: United States
- State: Ohio
- Founded: March 1, 1818
- Named for: General Jacob Brown
- Seat: Georgetown
- Largest village: Georgetown

Area
  - Total: 493 sq mi (1,280 km^{2})
  - Land: 490 sq mi (1,300 km^{2})
  - Water: 3.4 sq mi (8.8 km^{2}) 0.7%

Population (2020)
  - Total: 43,676
  - Estimate (2025): 44,397 ▲
  - Density: 89/sq mi (34/km^{2})
- Time zone: UTC−5 (Eastern)
  - Summer (DST): UTC−4 (EDT)
- Congressional district: 2nd
- Website: www.browncountyohio.gov

Brown County is a county in the U.S. state of Ohio. As of the 2020 United States census, the population was 43,676. The county seat is Georgetown. The county was created in 1818 and is named for Major General Jacob Brown, an officer in the War of 1812 who was wounded at the Battle of Lundy's Lane. Brown County is part of the Cincinnati–Middletown, OH–KY–IN Metropolitan Statistical Area.

== History ==
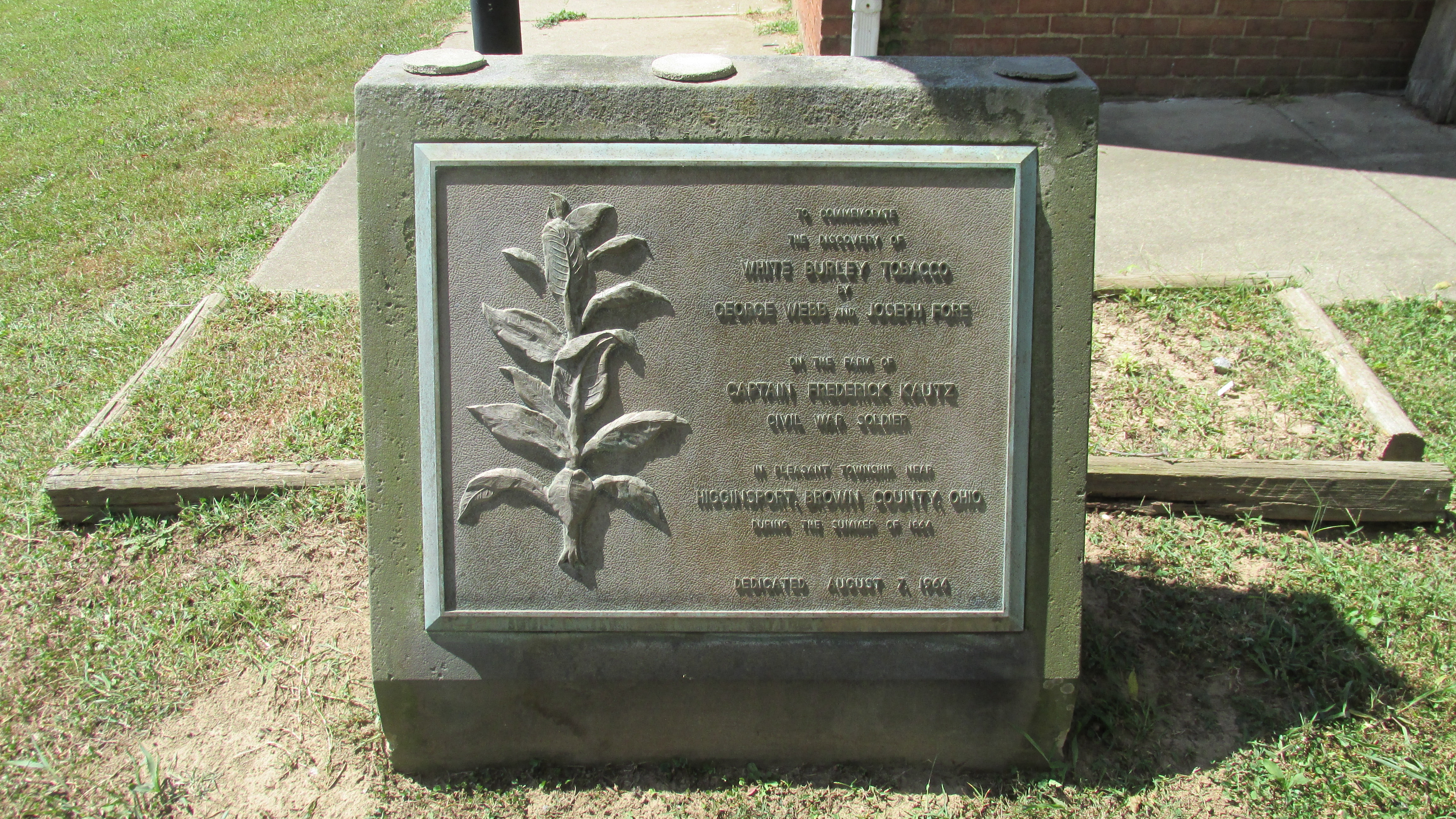
White burley tobacco monument dedicated on August 7, 1964, and located at the Ohio Tobacco Museum in Ripley.

After the American Revolutionary War, the federal government established the Northwest Territory, a large area which encompassed the present county. In 1790, several counties were established, Hamilton among them. In 1797, a portion of Hamilton was partitioned off to create Adams County, and in 1800 another portion was partitioned to create Clermont. This lasted for two decades, during which the area north of the Ohio River attracted settlers.

Among the early settlers was Jesse Root Grant (father of future US President Grant), who built a home and set up a tannery in the future Georgetown area, where young Hiram Ulysses (later changed to Ulysses S.) spent his youth.

On March 1, 1818, portions of Adams and Clermont counties were partitioned off to create Brown County, with Georgetown as its seat. The boundaries of the county were altered in 1874, when a portion was moved to Highland County; they have remained intact since then.

Brown County was said to be the place of origin of the White Burley type of tobacco, grown in 1864 by George Webb and Joseph Fore on the farm of Captain Frederick Kautz near Higginsport, with seed from Bracken County, Kentucky. He noticed it yielded a different type of light leaf shaded from white to yellow, and cured differently. By 1866, he harvested 20,000 pounds of Burley tobacco and sold it in 1867 at the St. Louis Fair for $58 per hundred pounds. By 1883, the principal market for this tobacco was Cincinnati, but it was grown throughout central Kentucky and Middle Tennessee. Later the type became referred to as burley tobacco, and it was air-cured.

== Geography ==
Brown County lies on the south line of the state of Ohio. Its south border abuts the north border of the state of Kentucky across the Ohio River. The Ohio flows westward along the county's south line. White Oak Creek flows southward through the lower part of southwest Brown County, discharging into the Ohio at Higginsport; Straight Creek flows southwestward through the lower central part of the county, discharging into the Ohio two miles (3.2 km) east of Higginsport. Eagle Creek flows southerly through the lower eastern part of the county, discharging into the Ohio east of Ripley. The east fork of the Little Miami River flows southwestward through the upper part of the county, entering Clermont County near Marathon.

The terrain of Brown County consists of low rolling hills, carved by drainages. All available areas are devoted to agriculture. The highest point (at 1,089' or 332 m ASL) in Brown County is a point on Ash Ridge, 9 miles (14 km) southeast of Lake Waynoka. The county has an area of 493 square miles (1,280 km^{2}), of which 490 square miles (1,300 km^{2}) is land and 3.4 square miles (8.8 km^{2}) (0.7%) is water.

=== Adjacent counties ===
- Clinton County – north
- Highland County – northeast
- Adams County – east
- Mason County, Kentucky – southeast
- Bracken County, Kentucky – southwest
- Clermont County – west

=== Lakes ===
- Grant Lake
- Lake Lorelei
- Lake Waynoka

=== Protected areas ===
- Della Gates and Charles Bott Wildlife Area
- Grant Lake Wildlife Area
- Indian Creek Wildlife Area
- Eagle Creek Wildlife Area

== Demographics ==
Historical population
Census	Pop.	Note	%±
1820	13,356		—
1830	17,867		33.8%
1840	22,715		27.1%
1850	27,332		20.3%
1860	29,958		9.6%
1870	30,802		2.8%
1880	32,911		6.8%
1890	29,899		−9.2%
1900	28,237		−5.6%
1910	24,832		−12.1%
1920	22,621		−8.9%
1930	20,148		−10.9%
1940	21,638		7.4%
1950	22,221		2.7%
1960	25,178		13.3%
1970	26,635		5.8%
1980	31,920		19.8%
1990	34,966		9.5%
2000	42,285		20.9%
2010	44,846		6.1%
2020	43,676		−2.6%
2025 (est.)	44,397	▲	1.7%
US Decennial Census; 1790-1960 1900-1990; 1990-2000 2020

=== 2020 census ===
As of the 2020 census, the county had a population of 43,676. The median age was 43.1 years. 22.8% of residents were under the age of 18 and 19.2% of residents were 65 years of age or older. For every 100 females there were 99.3 males, and for every 100 females age 18 and over there were 98.2 males age 18 and over.

The racial makeup of the county was 94.4% White, 0.7% Black or African American, 0.2% American Indian and Alaska Native, 0.2% Asian, <0.1% Native Hawaiian and Pacific Islander, 0.4% from some other race, and 4.0% from two or more races. Hispanic or Latino residents of any race comprised 1.1% of the population.

4.2% of residents lived in urban areas, while 95.8% lived in rural areas.

There were 17,153 households in the county, of which 29.9% had children under the age of 18 living in them. Of all households, 50.8% were married-couple households, 17.8% were households with a male householder and no spouse or partner present, and 23.1% were households with a female householder and no spouse or partner present. About 25.7% of all households were made up of individuals and 12.3% had someone living alone who was 65 years of age or older.

There were 19,324 housing units, of which 11.2% were vacant. Among occupied housing units, 74.5% were owner-occupied and 25.5% were renter-occupied. The homeowner vacancy rate was 1.5% and the rental vacancy rate was 6.7%.

=== Racial and ethnic composition ===
Brown County, Ohio – Racial and ethnic composition Note: the US Census treats Hispanic/Latino as an ethnic category. This table excludes Latinos from the racial categories and assigns them to a separate category. Hispanics/Latinos may be of any race.
Race / ethnicity (NH = Non-Hispanic)	Pop 1980	Pop 1990	Pop 2000	Pop 2010	Pop 2020	% 1980	% 1990	% 2000	% 2010	% 2020
White alone (NH)	31,318	34,451	41,342	43,570	41,053	98.11%	98.53%	97.77%	97.15%	93.99%
Black or African American alone (NH)	411	405	381	382	302	1.29%	1.16%	0.90%	0.85%	0.69%
Native American or Alaska Native alone (NH)	20	28	69	74	68	0.06%	0.08%	0.16%	0.17%	0.16%
Asian alone (NH)	43	30	53	107	84	0.13%	0.09%	0.13%	0.24%	0.19%
Native Hawaiian or Pacific Islander alone (NH)	x	x	2	3	2	x	x	0.00%	0.01%	0.00%
Other race alone (NH)	9	3	20	13	111	0.03%	0.01%	0.05%	0.03%	0.25%
Mixed race or Multiracial (NH)	x	x	233	428	1,569	x	x	0.55%	0.95%	3.59%
Hispanic or Latino (any race)	119	49	185	269	487	0.37%	0.14%	0.44%	0.60%	1.12%
Total	31,920	34,966	42,285	44,846	43,676	100.00%	100.00%	100.00%	100.00%	100.00%

=== 2010 census ===
As of the 2010 United States census, there were 44,846 people, 17,014 households, and 12,379 families in the county. The population density was 91.5 people per square mile (35.3 people/km^{2}). There were 19,301 housing units at an average density of 39.4 units per square mile (15.2/km^{2}). The racial makeup of the county was 97.5% white, 0.9% black or African American, 0.2% Asian, 0.2% American Indian, 0.2% from other races, and 1.0% from two or more races. Those of Hispanic or Latino origin made up 0.6% of the population. In terms of ancestry, 27.0% were German, 14.2% were Irish, 12.5% were American, and 9.7% were English.

Of the 17,014 households, 34.5% had children under the age of 18 living with them, 55.7% were married couples living together, 11.2% had a female householder with no husband present, 27.2% were non-families, and 22.6% of all households were made up of individuals. The average household size was 2.60 and the average family size was 3.02. The median age was 39.9 years.

The median income for a household in the county was $45,887 and the median income for a family was $54,184. Males had a median income of $39,049 versus $30,890 for females. The per capita income for the county was $20,167. About 9.0% of families and 12.4% of the population were below the poverty line, including 18.2% of those under age 18 and 8.4% of those age 65 or over.

=== 2000 census ===
As of the 2000 United States census, there were 42,285 people, 15,555 households, and 11,790 families in the county. The population density was 86.3 people per square mile (33.3 people/km^{2}). There were 17,193 housing units at an average density of 35.1 units per square mile (13.6/km^{2}). The racial makeup of the county was 98.08% White, 0.92% Black or African American, 0.18% Native American, 0.13% Asian, 0.08% from other races, and 0.60% from two or more races. 0.44% of the population were Hispanic or Latino of any race. 29.5% were of American, 28.2% German, 10.7% English and 10.2% Irish ancestry.

There were 15,555 households, out of which 37.10% had children under the age of 18 living with them, 61.30% were married couples living together, 10.00% had a female householder with no husband present, and 24.20% were non-families. 20.20% of all households were made up of individuals, and 8.50% had someone living alone who was 65 years of age or older. The average household size was 2.69 and the average family size was 3.09.

The county population contained 27.60% under the age of 18, 8.10% from 18 to 24, 30.30% from 25 to 44, 22.40% from 45 to 64, and 11.60% who were 65 years of age or older. The median age was 35 years. For every 100 females there were 96.80 males. For every 100 females age 18 and over, there were 94.80 males.

The county's median household income was $38,303, and the median family income was $43,040. Males had a median income of $32,647 versus $22,483 for females. The per capita income for the county was $17,100. About 8.80% of families and 11.60% of the population were below the poverty line, including 15.20% of those under age 18 and 9.40% of those age 65 or over.

== Politics ==
Prior to 1928, Brown County was a Democratic Party stronghold in presidential elections. 1928 to 1988 saw the county become a swing county, backing the national winner in all but 1944 & 1960. It has since become a Republican Party stronghold, with Jimmy Carter in 1976 representing the last Democratic win of the county at the presidential level but Bill Clinton came within just 372 votes in 1992 and 652 votes in 1996.

United States presidential election results for Brown County, Ohio
Year	Republican		Democratic		Third party(ies)	
Year	No.	%	No.	%	No.	%
1856	1,785	36.33%	2,700	54.96%	428	8.71%
1860	2,105	38.69%	3,006	55.26%	329	6.05%
1864	2,702	47.98%	2,929	52.02%	0	0.00%
1868	2,715	45.61%	3,238	54.39%	0	0.00%
1872	2,593	43.64%	3,337	56.16%	12	0.20%
1876	2,956	41.99%	4,068	57.78%	16	0.23%
1880	3,184	42.35%	4,324	57.51%	11	0.15%
1884	3,226	42.75%	4,272	56.61%	49	0.65%
1888	3,055	40.95%	4,237	56.79%	169	2.27%
1892	2,865	40.26%	3,975	55.85%	277	3.89%
1896	3,170	41.08%	4,485	58.13%	61	0.79%
1900	2,991	39.95%	4,397	58.73%	99	1.32%
1904	2,730	42.40%	3,590	55.76%	118	1.83%
1908	2,638	38.02%	4,242	61.14%	58	0.84%
1912	1,650	28.27%	3,451	59.13%	735	12.59%
1916	2,227	35.68%	3,959	63.43%	56	0.90%
1920	4,009	42.79%	5,317	56.74%	44	0.47%
1924	3,616	43.05%	4,120	49.05%	663	7.89%
1928	5,681	62.05%	3,422	37.38%	52	0.57%
1932	3,930	36.86%	6,601	61.91%	131	1.23%
1936	4,511	40.68%	6,316	56.96%	261	2.35%
1940	5,477	49.25%	5,644	50.75%	0	0.00%
1944	5,024	51.44%	4,743	48.56%	0	0.00%
1948	3,931	43.20%	5,140	56.49%	28	0.31%
1952	5,635	53.86%	4,828	46.14%	0	0.00%
1956	5,690	56.70%	4,346	43.30%	0	0.00%
1960	6,461	55.73%	5,133	44.27%	0	0.00%
1964	3,904	35.86%	6,983	64.14%	0	0.00%
1968	4,700	44.27%	3,610	34.00%	2,307	21.73%
1972	6,772	62.68%	3,770	34.89%	262	2.43%
1976	4,549	44.92%	5,432	53.64%	145	1.43%
1980	6,065	53.50%	4,706	41.51%	566	4.99%
1984	8,221	66.28%	4,067	32.79%	116	0.94%
1988	7,539	59.37%	5,047	39.75%	112	0.88%
1992	5,912	38.93%	5,540	36.48%	3,734	24.59%
1996	6,970	45.36%	6,318	41.12%	2,078	13.52%
2000	10,027	61.03%	5,972	36.35%	430	2.62%
2004	12,647	63.58%	7,140	35.89%	105	0.53%
2008	12,192	60.46%	7,503	37.21%	471	2.34%
2012	11,916	61.45%	7,107	36.65%	369	1.90%
2016	14,573	74.04%	4,353	22.12%	756	3.84%
2020	16,480	77.96%	4,380	20.72%	279	1.32%
2024	17,257	80.22%	4,069	18.92%	186	0.86%

United States Senate election results for Brown County, Ohio1
Year	Republican		Democratic		Third party(ies)	
Year	No.	%	No.	%	No.	%
2024	15,622	74.46%	4,610	21.97%	748	3.57%

== Government ==
Brown County has three County Commissioners who oversee the various County departments. Commissioners (as of Nov. 2018) are:

- Barry Woodruff (R)
- Daryll Gray (R)
- Tony Applegate (R)

== Media ==
=== Radio ===
- WRAC C103 Country 103.1 FM (West Union)
- WAOL 99.5 (Ripley)

=== Newspapers ===
- The News Democrat (Georgetown)
- The Brown County Press (Mount Orab)
- The County Free Press (Georgetown, Monthly)
- The Ripley Bee (Ripley, Weekly)

== Transportation ==
=== Airports ===
The Brown County Airport is located one nautical mile (1.2 mi; 1.9 km) northeast of Georgetown's central business district.

=== Major highways ===
- US 50
- US 52
- US 62
- US 68
- SR 32
- SR 123
- SR 125
- SR 131
- SR 134
- SR 221
- SR 286
- SR 353
- SR 505
- SR 756
- SR 763
- SR 774

== Communities ==
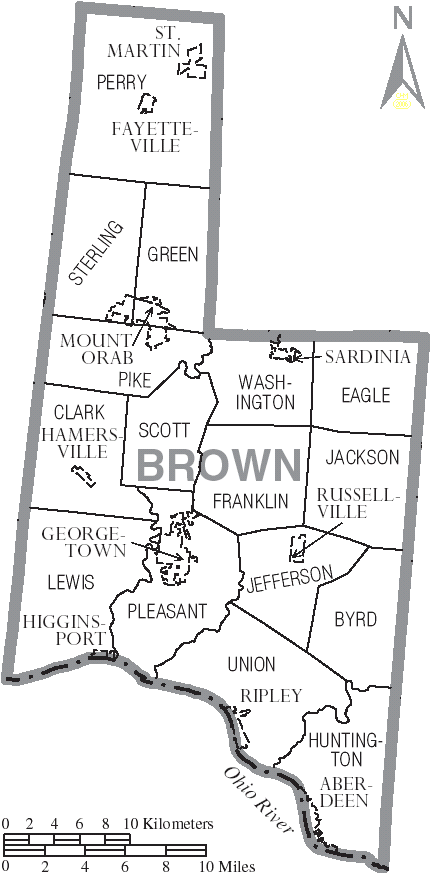
Map of Brown County, Ohio With Municipal and Township Labels

=== Villages ===
- Aberdeen
- Fayetteville
- Georgetown (county seat)
- Hamersville
- Higginsport
- Mount Orab
- Ripley
- Russellville
- Sardinia

=== Census-designated places ===
- Lake Lorelei
- Lake Waynoka
- St. Martin

=== Unincorporated communities ===
- Arnheim
- Ash Ridge
- Bardwell
- Boudes Ferry
- Brownstown
- Centerville
- Chasetown
- Crosstown
- Decatur
- Eastwood
- Ellsberry
- Feesburg
- Fincastle
- Fivemile
- Greenbush
- Hiett
- Levanna
- Locust Ridge
- Macon
- Maple
- Neals Corner
- Neel
- New Harmony
- New Hope
- Redoak
- Upper Fivemile
- Vera Cruz
- Wahlsburg
- White Oak
- White Oak Valley

=== Townships ===
- Byrd
- Clark
- Eagle
- Franklin
- Green
- Huntington
- Jackson
- Jefferson
- Lewis
- Perry
- Pike
- Pleasant
- Scott
- Sterling
- Union
- Washington

== See also ==
- National Register of Historic Places listings in Brown County, Ohio
