= Russellville, Ohio =

- Village
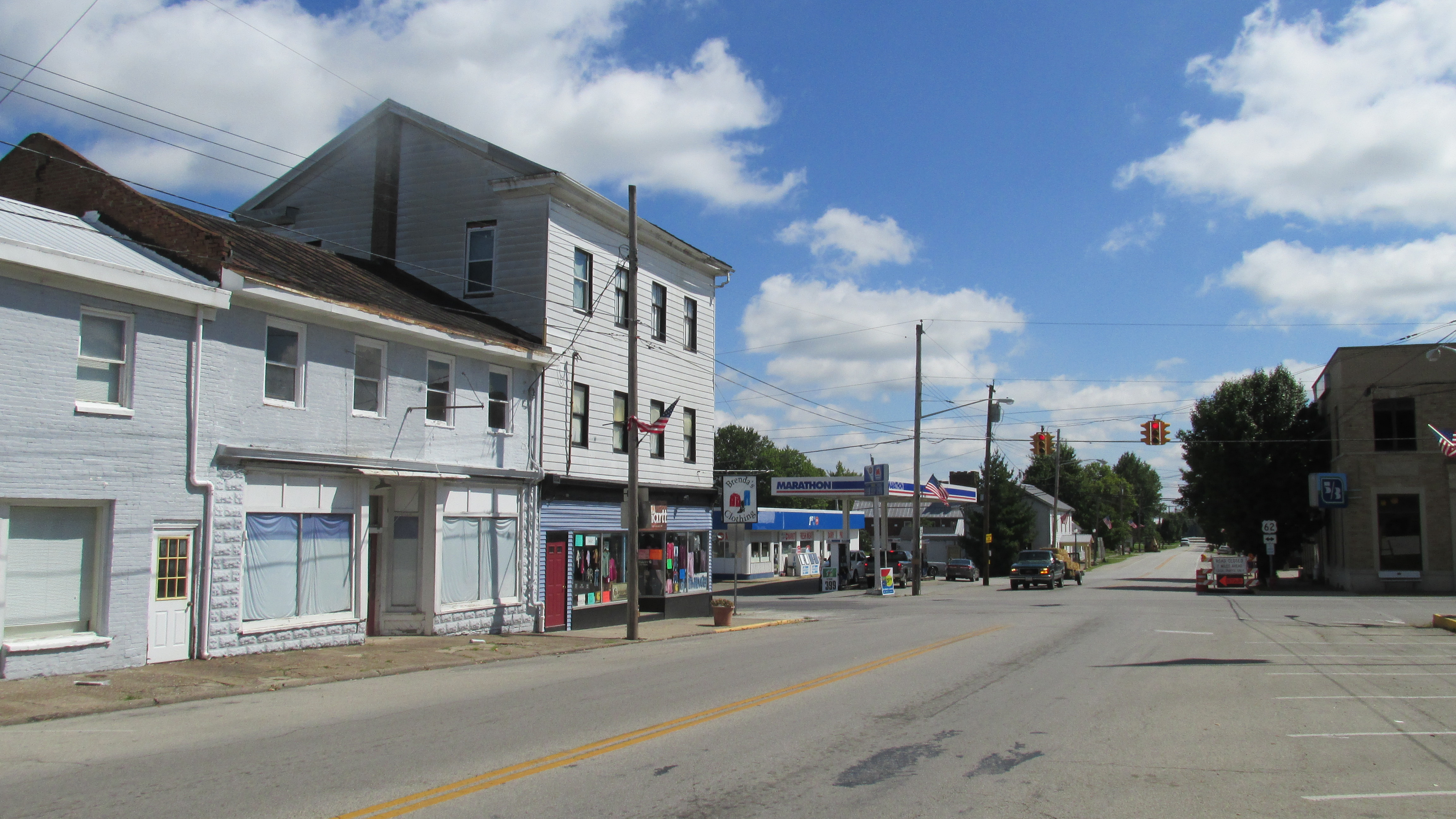
- Looking east at the intersection of Main Street (Ohio State Route 125) and Columbus Street (U.S. Route 62) in Russellville

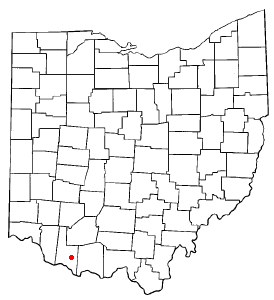
- Location of Russellville, Ohio

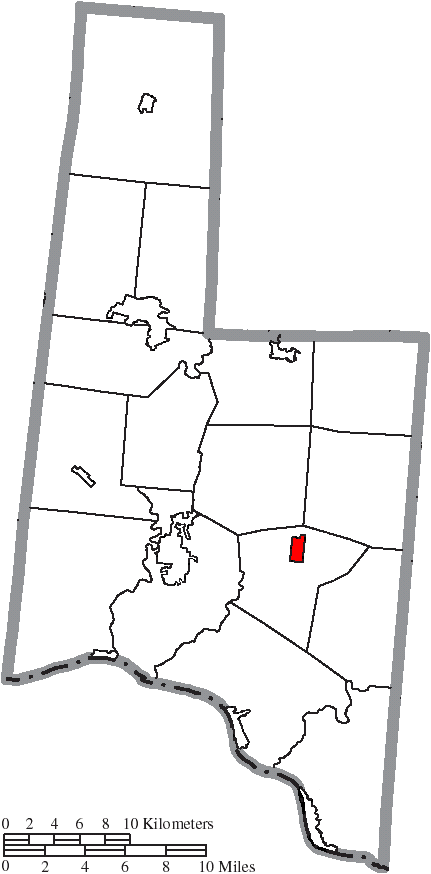
- Location of Russellville in Brown County
- Coordinates: 38°52′16″N 83°47′18″W
- Country: United States
- State: Ohio
- County: Brown
- Township: Jefferson

Government
  - Mayor: Paula J. Neu

Area
  - Total: 0.73 sq mi (1.89 km^{2})
  - Land: 0.73 sq mi (1.89 km^{2})
  - Water: 0 sq mi (0.00 km^{2})
- Elevation: 968 ft (295 m)

Population (2020)
  - Total: 542
  - Density: 743.1/sq mi (286.91/km^{2})
- Time zone: UTC-5 (Eastern (EST))
  - Summer (DST): UTC-4 (EDT)
- ZIP code: 45168
- Area codes: 937, 326
- FIPS code: 39-69316
- GNIS feature ID: 2399147

Russellville is a village in Jefferson Township, Brown County, Ohio, United States. The population was 542 at the 2020 census.

== History ==
Russellville was laid out in 1817 by Russell Shaw, and named for him.

== Geography ==
According to the United States Census Bureau, the village has a total area of 0.73 square miles (1.89 km^{2}), all land.

== Demographics ==
Historical population
Census	Pop.	Note	%±
1850	386		—
1860	465		20.5%
1870	359		−22.8%
1880	478		33.1%
1890	324		−32.2%
1900	394		21.6%
1910	438		11.2%
1920	435		−0.7%
1930	411		−5.5%
1940	452		10.0%
1950	438		−3.1%
1960	412		−5.9%
1970	399		−3.2%
1980	445		11.5%
1990	459		3.1%
2000	453		−1.3%
2010	561		23.8%
2020	542		−3.4%
U.S. Decennial Census

=== 2010 census ===
As of the census of 2010, there were 561 people, 209 households, and 139 families living in the village. The population density was 768.5 inhabitants per square mile (296.7/km^{2}). There were 236 housing units at an average density of 323.3 per square mile (124.8/km^{2}). The racial makeup of the village was 99.1% White, 0.5% African American, and 0.4% from two or more races. Hispanic or Latino of any race were 0.5% of the population.

There were 209 households, of which 40.7% had children under the age of 18 living with them, 48.3% were married couples living together, 14.4% had a female householder with no husband present, 3.8% had a male householder with no wife present, and 33.5% were non-families. 25.8% of all households were made up of individuals, and 12.4% had someone living alone who was 65 years of age or older. The average household size was 2.68 and the average family size was 3.28.

The median age in the village was 33.7 years. 30.3% of residents were under the age of 18; 7.8% were between the ages of 18 and 24; 27.3% were from 25 to 44; 20.8% were from 45 to 64; and 13.9% were 65 years of age or older. The gender makeup of the village was 48.1% male and 51.9% female.

=== 2000 census ===
As of the census of 2000, there were 453 people, 190 households, and 121 families living in the village. The population density was 582.2 inhabitants per square mile (224.8/km^{2}). There were 215 housing units at an average density of 276.3 per square mile (106.7/km^{2}). The racial makeup of the village was 98.68% White, 0.88% African American, and 0.44% from two or more races. Hispanic or Latino of any race were 1.10% of the population.

There were 190 households, out of which 27.9% had children under the age of 18 living with them, 50.0% were married couples living together, 9.5% had a female householder with no husband present, and 35.8% were non-families. 32.1% of all households were made up of individuals, and 19.5% had someone living alone who was 65 years of age or older. The average household size was 2.35 and the average family size was 2.98.

In the village, the population was spread out, with 25.8% under the age of 18, 7.1% from 18 to 24, 25.4% from 25 to 44, 21.4% from 45 to 64, and 20.3% who were 65 years of age or older. The median age was 38 years. For every 100 females there were 84.1 males. For every 100 females age 18 and over, there were 84.6 males.

The median income for a household in the village was $30,000, and the median income for a family was $38,594. Males had a median income of $26,875 versus $21,250 for females. The per capita income for the village was $15,010. About 4.5% of families and 7.0% of the population were below the poverty line, including 3.4% of those under age 18 and 10.8% of those age 65 or over.

== Education ==
Russellville Elementary School, the only school in the village, has approximately 480 pupils and 28 full-time staff.

== Notable person ==
- Mills Gardner, attorney and Ohio congressman

== Gallery ==
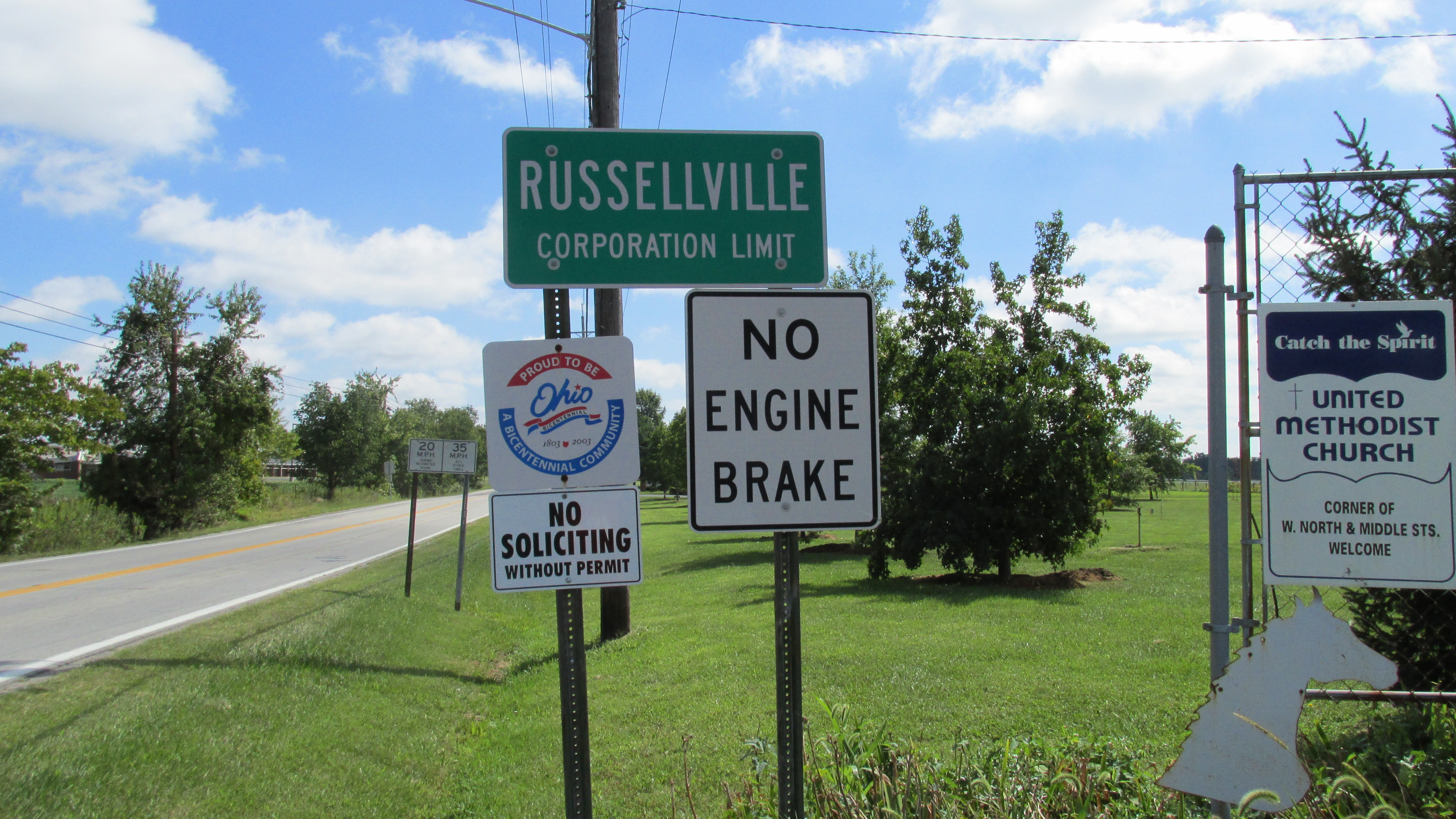
Russellville corporation limit sign

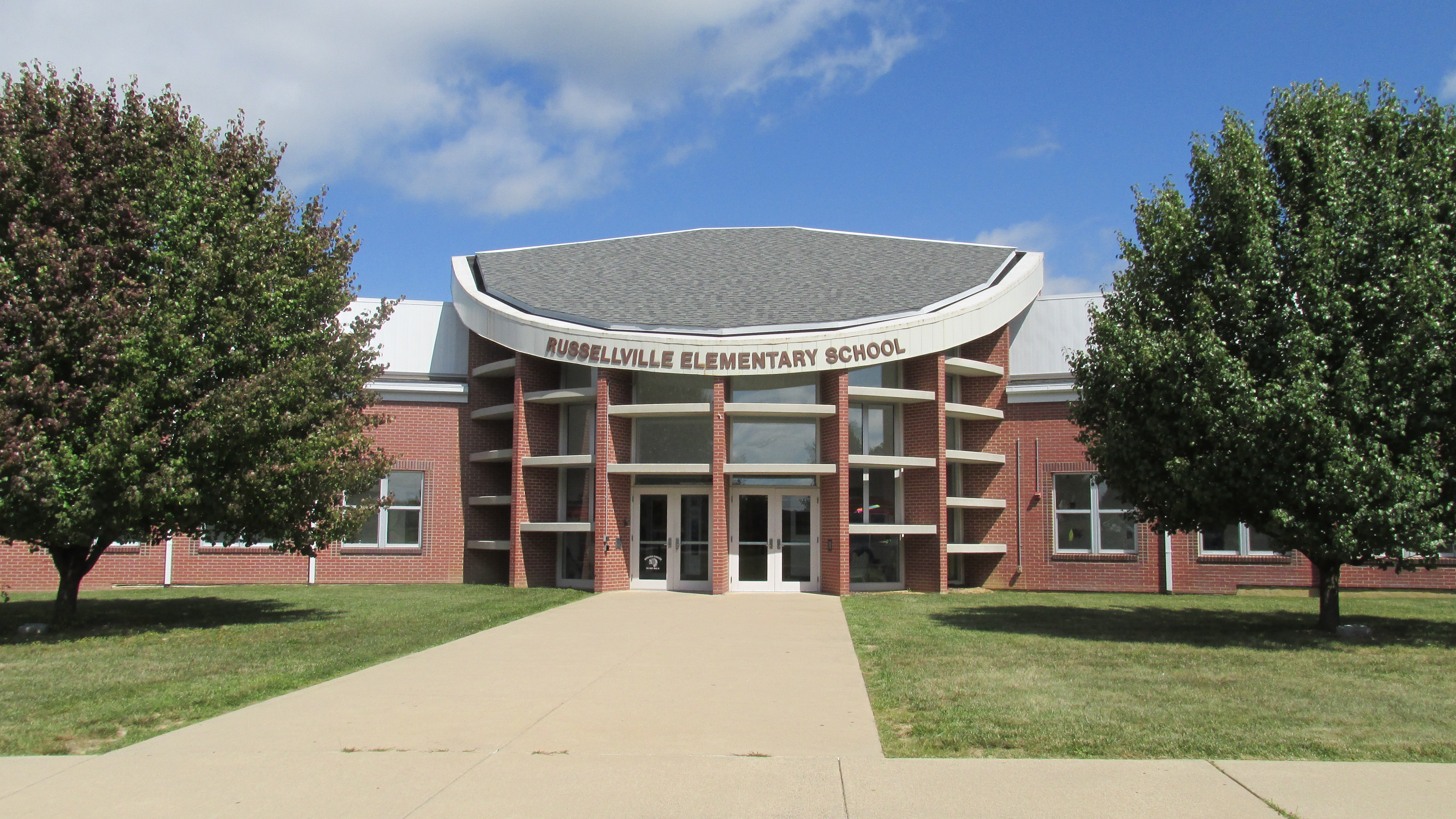
Russellville Elementary School

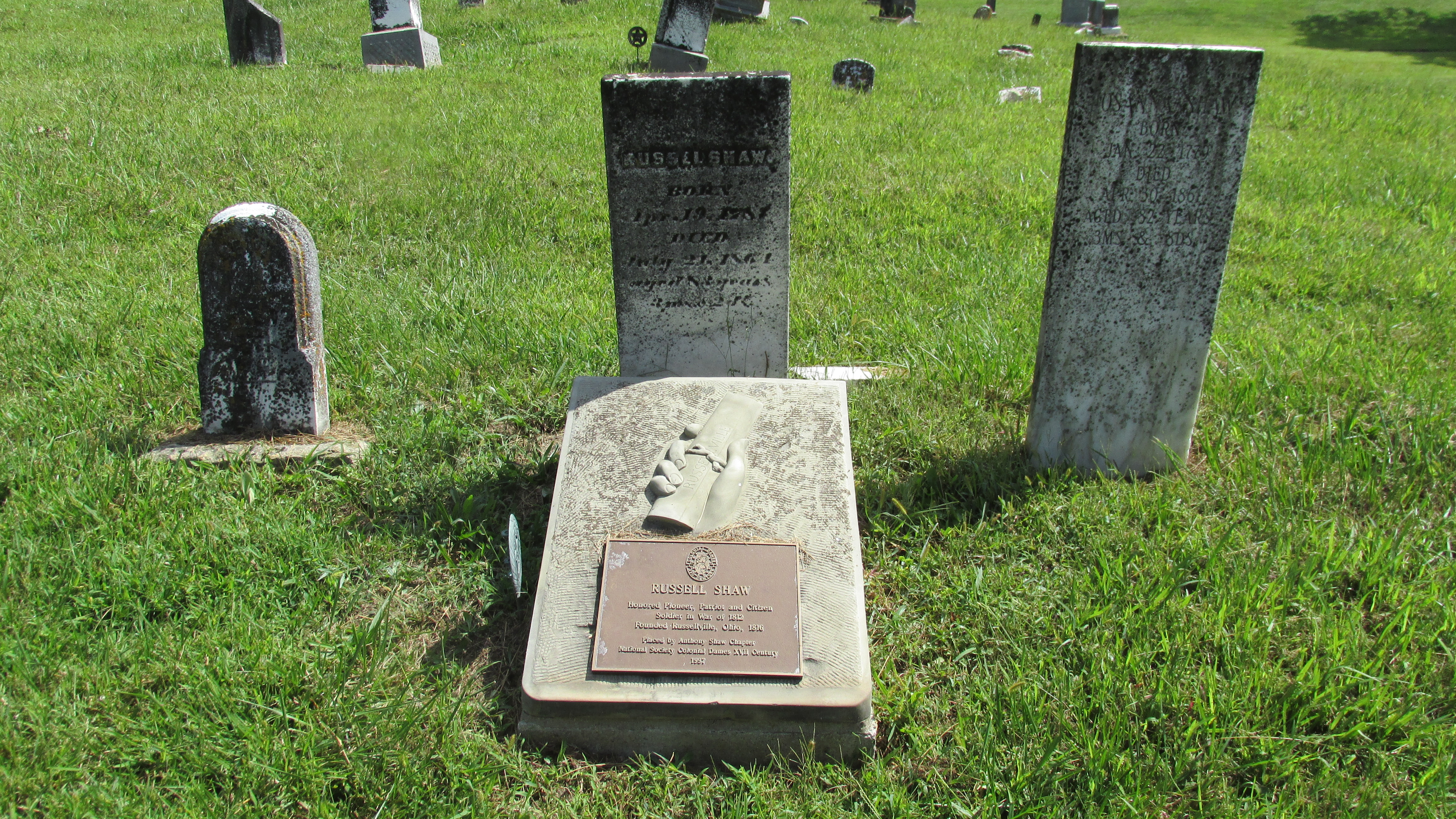
Grave of Russell Shaw, the founder of Russellville, in Shaw Cemetery
