= Paris, Kentucky slave coffle of summer 1822 =

U.S. forced migration

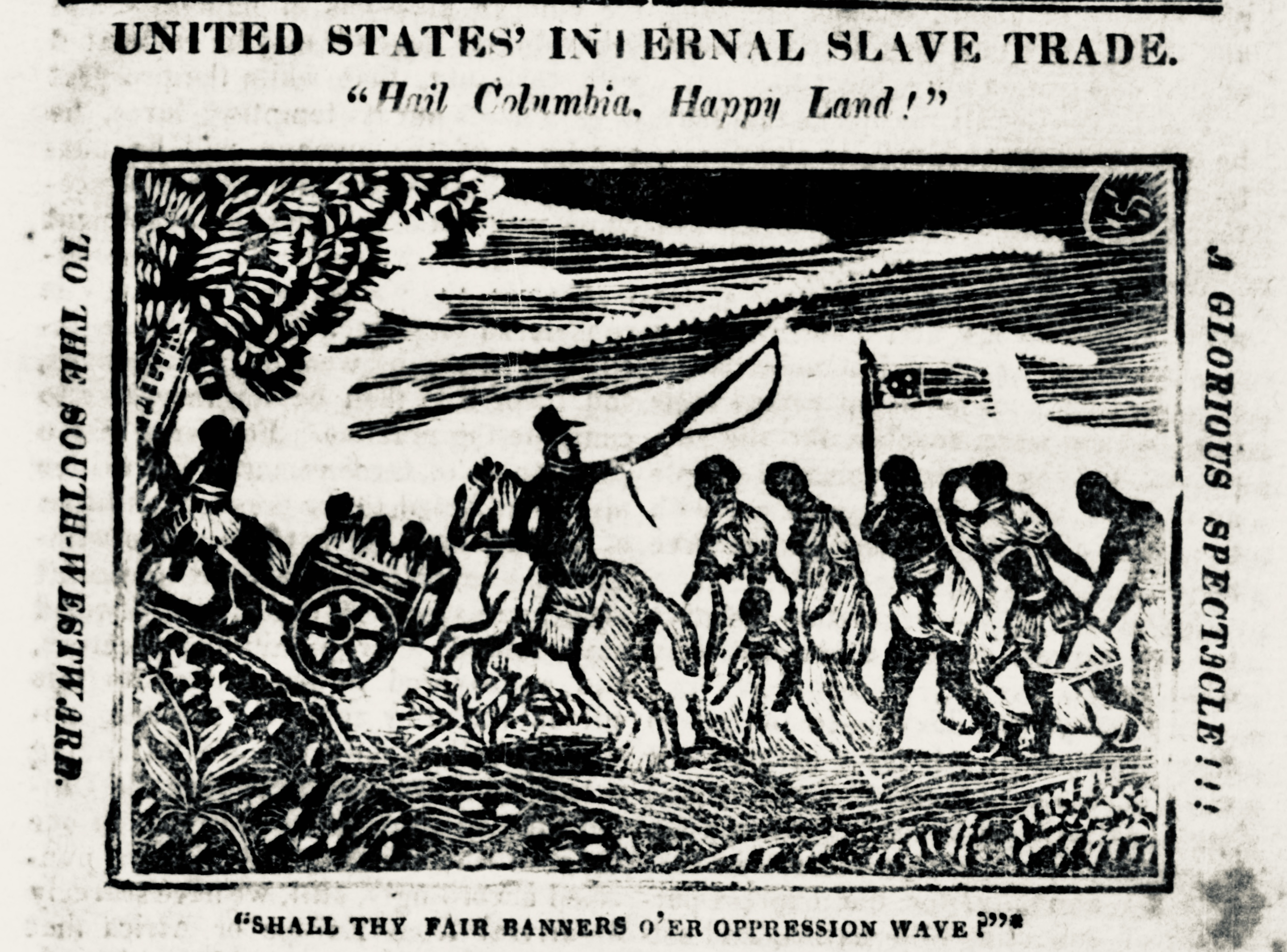
Genius of Universal Emancipation (1823)

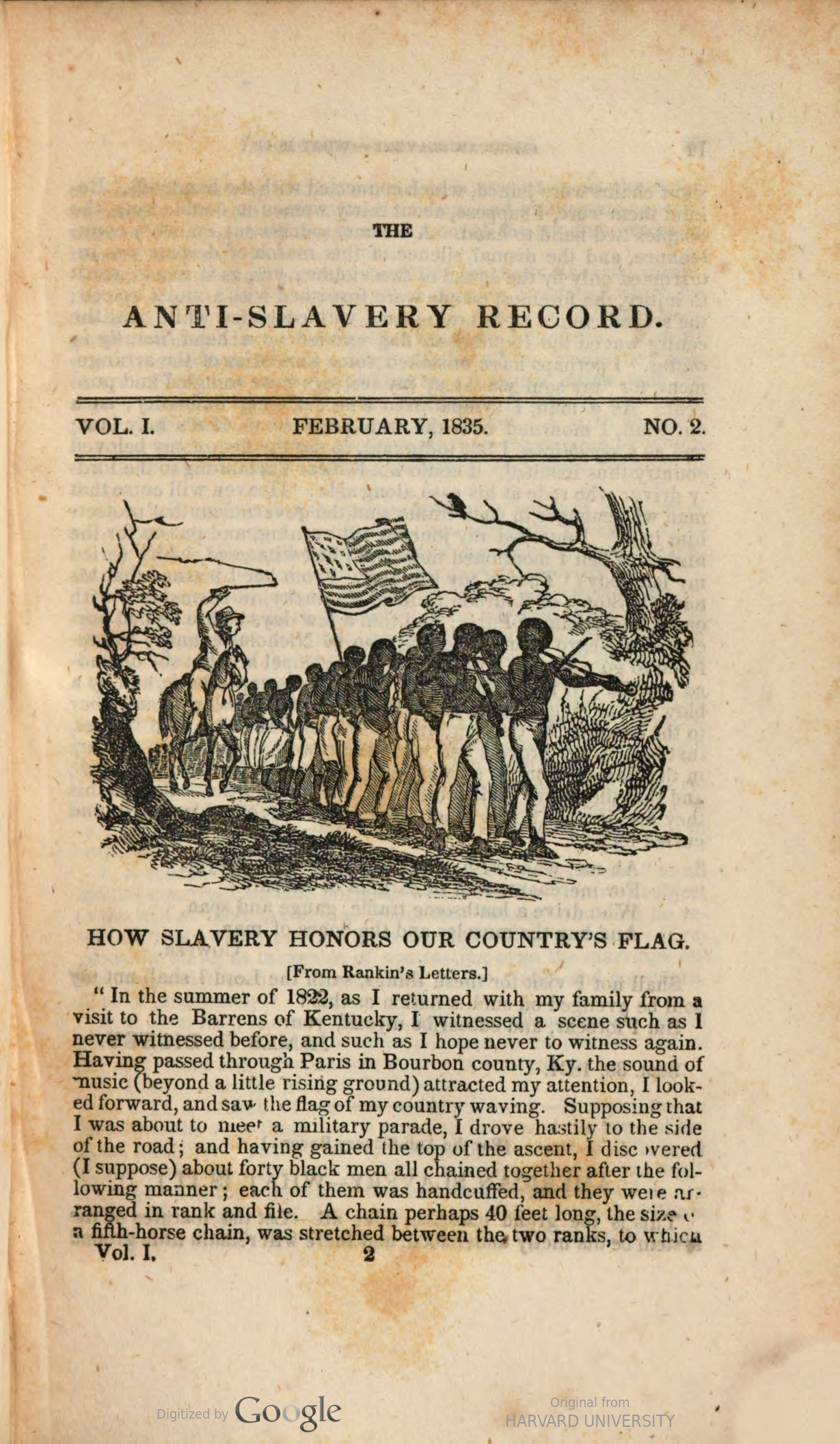
The Anti-Slavery Record (1835)

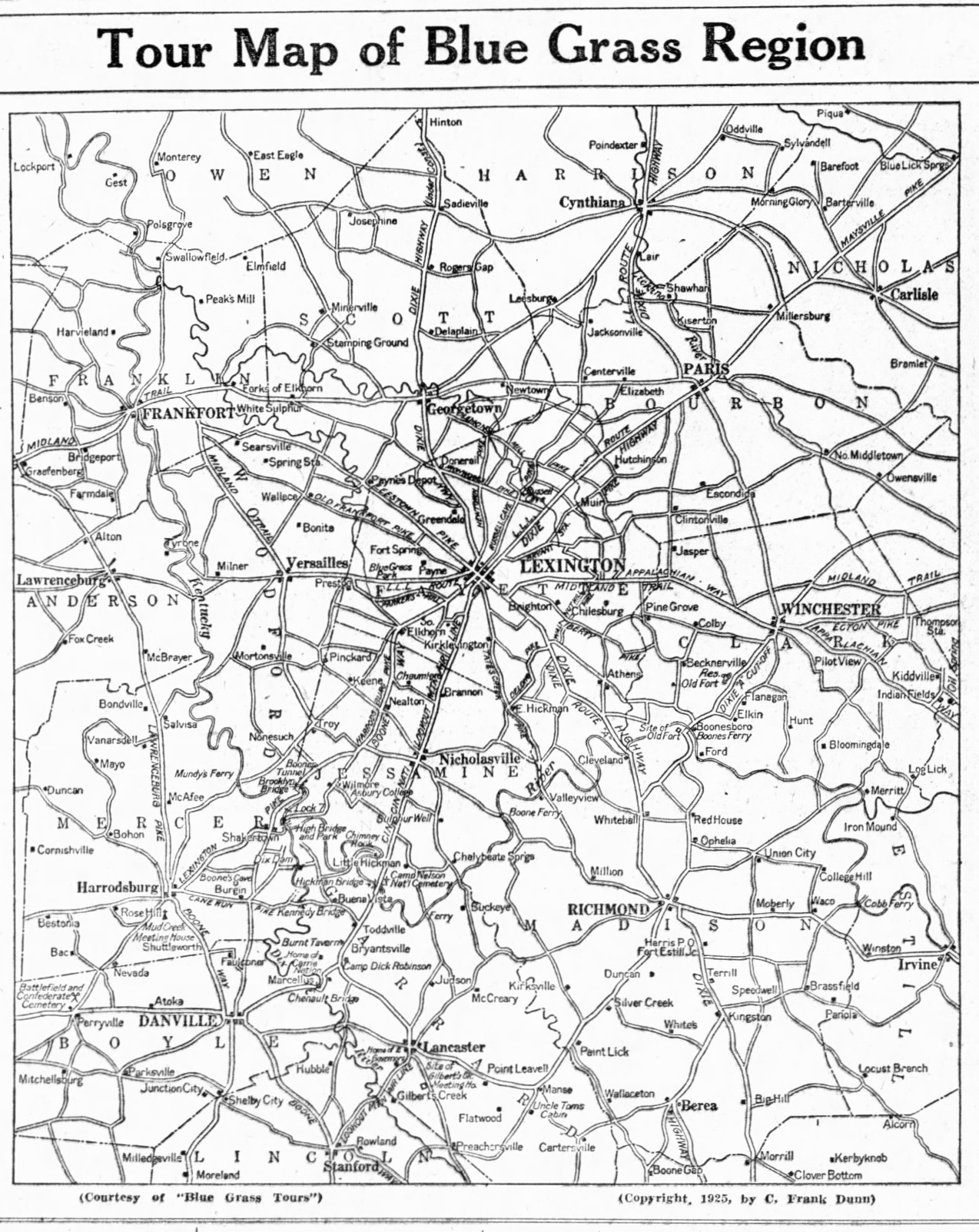
This 1925 map of the Bluegrass region shows some historic landmarks and the relative position of Lexington and Paris; the Maysville Pike leads to the Ohio River

The Paris, Kentucky slave coffle of summer 1822 is notable among thousands of such coffles of chained slaves forced to travel overland as part of the interstate slave trade in the United States because it was observed and carefully described by Ohio Presbyterian minister Rev. James H. Dickey, who reported that the slaves were marching under the flag of the United States. According to The Liberator by way of John Rankin this group of slaves was the legal property of Kentucky slave traders named Stone and Kinningham. (Note: In 1826, an Edward Stone of Bourbon County, Kentucky would be thrown overboard and killed by slaves he was transporting, in an incident known as the Ohio River slave rebellion. His plantation is on the National Register of Historic Places.) This is presumably Edward Stone and Benjamin Keiningham of Bourbon County, Kentucky.

In the summer of 1822, as I returned with my family from a visit to the Barrens of Kentucky, I witnessed a scene such as I never witnessed before, and such as I hope never to witness again. Having passed through Paris, in Bourbon County, Kentucky, the sound of music (beyond a little rising ground) attracted my attention. I looked forward, and saw the flag of my country waving. Supposing that I was about to meet a military parade, I drove hastily to the side of the road; and, having gained the ascent, I discovered (I supposed) about 40 black men all chained together after the following manner: each of them was handcuffed, and they were arranged in rank and file. A chain perhaps 40 feet long, the size of a fifth-horse-chain, was stretched between the two ranks, to which short chains were joined, which connected with the handcuffs. Behind them were, I suppose, about 30 women, in double rank, the couples tied hand to hand. A solemn sadness sat on every countenance, and the dismal silence of this march of despair was interrupted only by the sound of two violins; yes, as if to add insult to injury, the foremost couple were furnished with a violin a-piece; the second couple were ornamented with cockades, while near the centre waved the republican flag, carried by a hand literally in chains.

— Rev. James H. Dickey

Abolitionists in the United States would repeatedly return to the image created in the mind by Dickey's description, using it to pair American patriotism and abolitionism in the minds of their readers and affiliates. Scholar Teresa A. Goddu describes the woodcut image created for Ben Lundy's Genius of Universal Emancipation in 1823 in this light: "Anti-slavery visual culture may portray the power of slavery's visual regime, but its ultimate goal is to assert anti-slavery's dominance over the visual field. Within the picture, anti-slavery's visual supremacy is symbolized by the flag. Placed near the center of the image, the flag serves as a counter to the slaveholder's whip and provides the viewer another high-flying vantage point with which to identify." In 1835, the American Anti-Slavery Society also created an etching depicting the scene, for publication in their journal The Anti-Slavery Record.

== See also ==
- John W. Anderson and Mason County, Kentucky slave pen
