= Hugh Doak Rankin =

American artist (1878–1956)

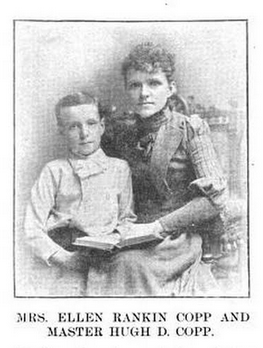
Ellen Rankin Copp and her son Hugh, in an 1893 publication

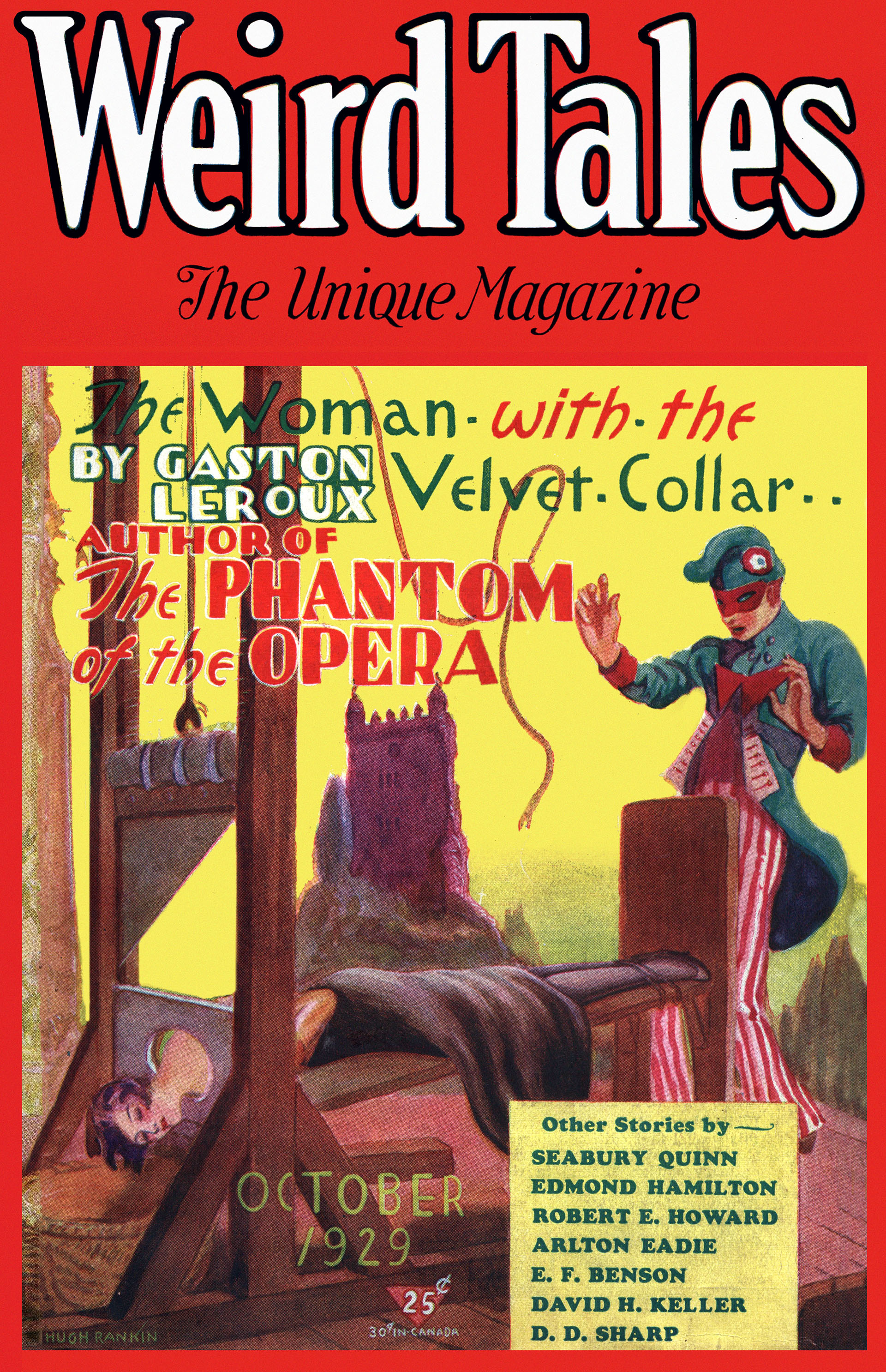
Weird Tales (October 1929); cover illustration by Hugh Rankin

Hugh Doak Rankin, born Hugh Dearborn Copp (July 2, 1878— January 3, 1956) was an American artist who illustrated the science fiction magazine Weird Tales in the 1920s and 1930s.

== Early life ==
Hugh Dearborn Copp was born in Loda, Illinois, the only surviving son of William H. Copp and Ellen Rankin Copp. His mother was a sculptor. His great-grandparents Jean Lowry Rankin and John Rankin were noted abolitionists and hosts on the Underground Railroad in Ohio. When his parents separated, Ellen and Hugh went to live in Munich and study art. On June 28, 1897, his father went to his wife's house in order to get her to sign a document confirming their reconciliation. He then attacked his wife's family with a razor and a revolver. Rankin's grandfather and mother were injured in the ensuring fight, but there were no fatalities. The police intervened and arrested William Copp. After this event, Hugh Copp distanced himself from his father's family and changed his name to Hugh Doak Rankin. He served in the United States Army during World War I.

== Career ==
Rankin got an early start as an exhibiting artist; as a teenager, his panel sculpture of "brownies" racing through hurdles was displayed in the children's room of the Women's Building at the World's Columbian Exposition in Chicago in 1893. After the Exposition, he was granted $300 to continue his art studies.

As an adult, he started making illustrations for newspapers in Ohio and Chicago, before World War I. He was best known for his covers and interior illustrations for Weird Tales beginning in 1927. Sometimes he signed his work "H. R." or using his middle name only, as "DOAK." He illustrated works by authors E. Hoffmann Price, H.P. Lovecraft, Edmond Hamilton and Robert E. Howard.

It was primarily the nature of Rankin's artwork for Weird Tales covers which made young Robert Bloch's parents disapprove of the magazine, causing Bloch to cease reading it from 1928-1931, until he resumed reading it in 1932.

Rankin's style was called "strange, imaginative – if almost abstract — art-deco work" by a nostalgic fan many years later. He also copyrighted a children's toy, the "Ziggity-zoo", which involved "drawings of animals with interchangeable heads."

== Personal life ==
He lived with his maternal grandmother Susanna Rankin, his mother's sister, Louisa, and her husband Paul E. Hermes, in Chicago after his mother's death, and later in adulthood in Los Angeles, California, where he was still living at the time of his death in 1956, aged 77 years. As a World War I veteran, his remains were buried in the Fort Rosecrans National Cemetery in San Diego. His name was also added to his mother's tombstone in Logan County, Illinois.
