= Ellen Rankin Copp =

American sculptor

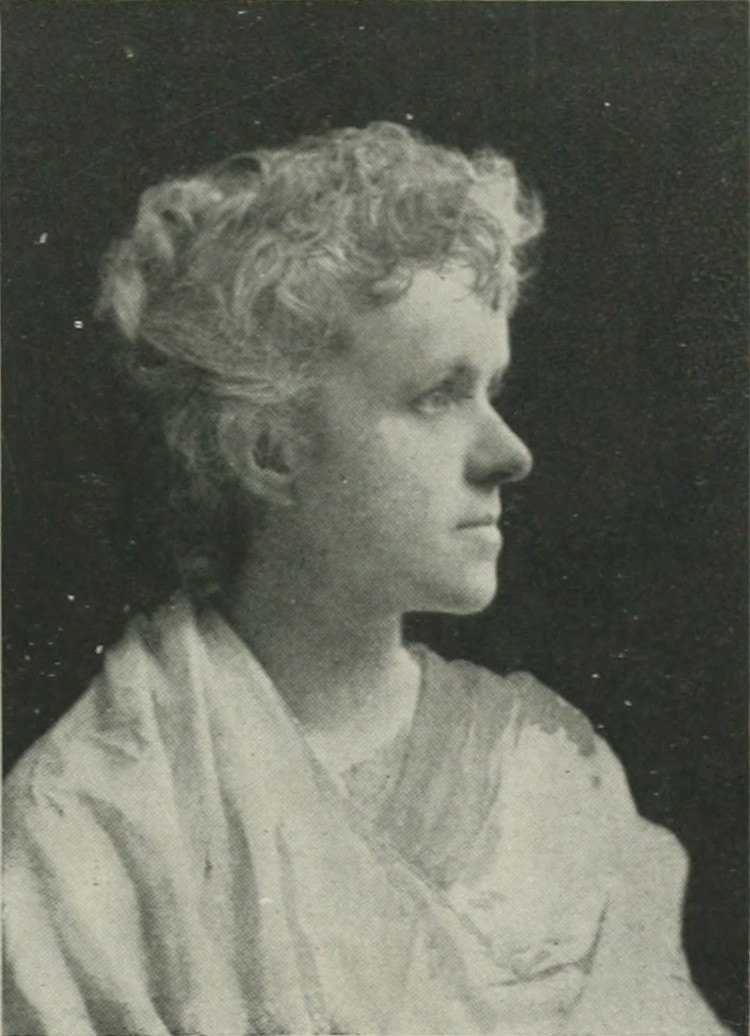
- Born: Ellen Houser Rankin; August 4, 1853; Atlanta, Illinois
- Died: August 8, 1901 (aged 48)
- Known for: Sculpture
- Spouse: W. H. Copp (m. 1874)

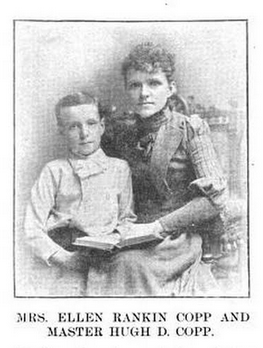
Ellen Rankin Copp and her son Hugh, in an 1893 publication

Ellen Rankin Copp (August 4, 1853 – August 8, 1901), also called Ellen or Helen Houser Rankin, was an American sculptor. Her works were featured at the World's Columbian Exposition in Chicago in 1893.

== Early life ==
Helen or Ellen Houser Rankin was born in Atlanta, Illinois, the daughter of Dr. Andrew Campbell Rankin and Susanna Roush Houser Rankin. Her father was a medical doctor who served as an army surgeon in the American Civil War. Her grandparents Jean Lowry Rankin and John Rankin were noted abolitionists and hosts on the Underground Railroad in Ohio. In 1888 Ellen began as a student at the Art Institute of Chicago in her thirties after some years teaching. At the Art Institute she studied with Lorado Taft, as one of his student assistants dubbed "White Rabbits".

== Career ==
In 1890, Ellen Rankin Copp won the first medal for sculpture awarded by the Art Institute of Chicago. She created "Maternity" on commission for the Illinois Building, and "Pele" on commission for the Hawaii Building, both at the World's Columbian Exposition in 1893. The 24-foot-tall statue of Pele was promoted as the "largest statue ever made by a woman." Four more works by Copp were shown at the Exposition: a bronze relief portrait of Harriet Monroe, displayed in the Palace of Fine Arts; a bronze relief portrait of Bertha Palmer, in the Library of the Woman's Building; and two smaller works inside the Illinois Building.

After the Exposition, Copp took her son to Europe, and pursued further art education in Munich; she showed her "Strength of Nations" sculpture there in 1895.

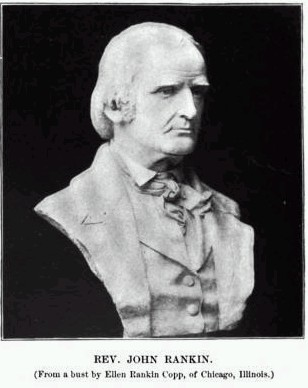
Bust of Rev. John Rankin by Ellen Rankin Copp

Copp made portrait busts of prominent Chicagoans, and one of her grandfather Reverend Rankin, for the city of Ripley, Ohio. In 1896 she submitted an ambitious proposal for a war monument in Texas.

== Personal life ==
Helen Houser Rankin married William H. Copp in 1874. They had five sons; four died in infancy. Ellen Rankin left William Copp behind when she took their son to Europe, and began using her unmarried name. In 1897, Mr. Copp, angry and distraught about the separation and his own unemployment, attacked Ellen's parents and sister with a razor and a revolver. Her father's throat was cut, and Copp was shot and nearly lost a finger in the encounter, but there were no fatalities.

Their surviving son Hugh Dearborn Copp (1878-1956), called Hugh Doak Rankin after his parents separated, also became an artist, best known as a science fiction illustrator.

Ellen Rankin Copp died in 1901, aged 48 years; she was survived by her estranged husband and both of her parents.
