= Jean Rankin =

Jean Rankin may refer to:

- Jean Lowry Rankin (1795–1877), American abolitionist
- Lady Jean Rankin (1905–2001), Scottish naturalist and courtier
