= Hark, from the Tomb =

American folk song

"Hark, from the Tomb" is a hymn sung as an American folk and blues song in the United States. The words may have first been put down by English hymn writer Isaac Watts. It was sung in America by the 19th century or earlier, as a Kentucky minister described it in a memoir published 1888 as being sung by the line leader of a slave coffle in that state. It was recorded in 1936 in Smithville, Tennessee, in 1952 in Batesville, Arkansas, and in 1958 in Rogers, Arkansas.

The title of the hymn appears in a piece of dialogue in Adventures of Huckleberry Finn and was borrowed from there into Finnegans Wake.
