= Coffle =

Forced-march caravan of chained enslaved people or animals

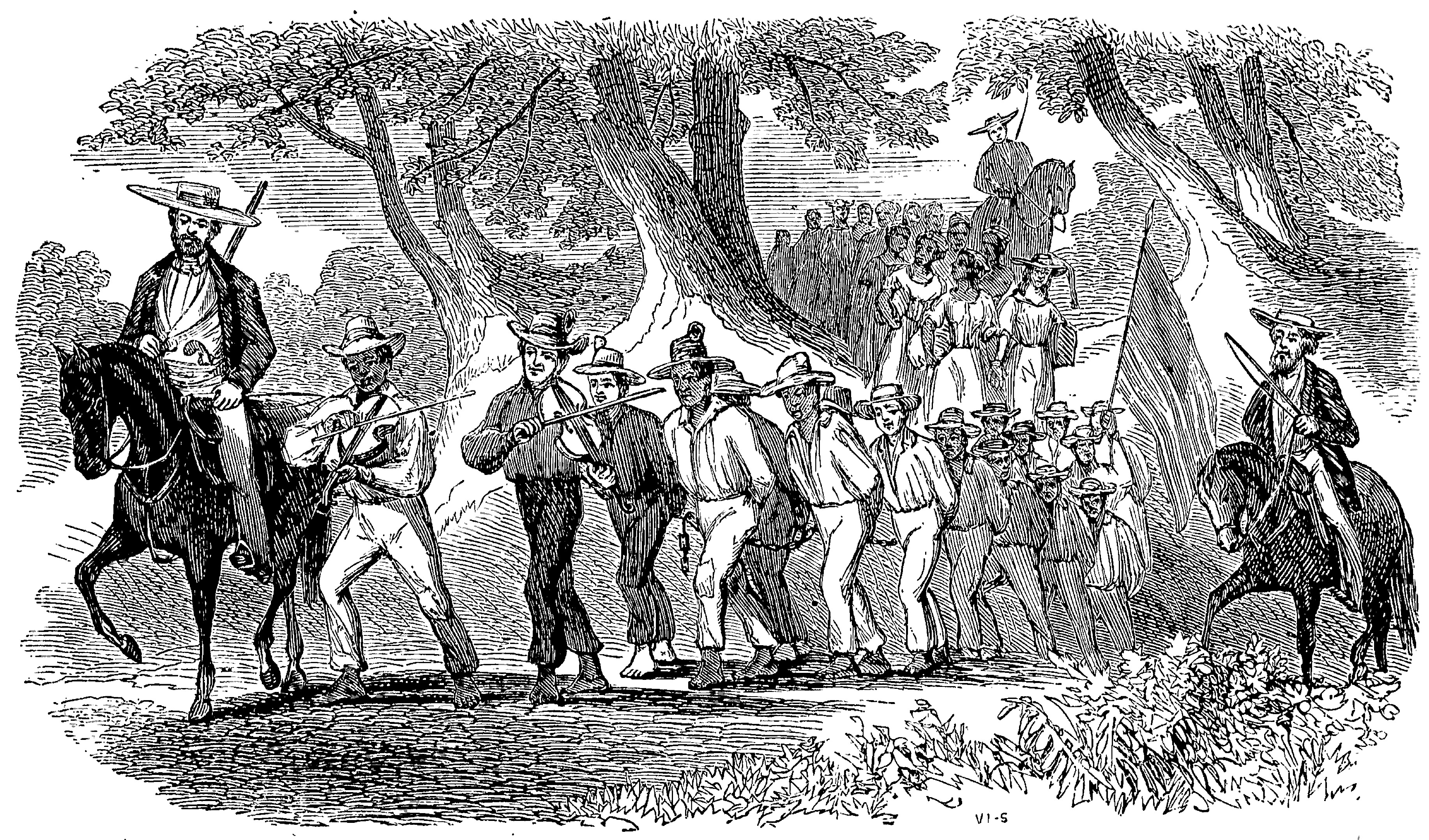
Coffle gang

A coffle, sometimes called a platoon or a drove, was a group of enslaved people chained together and marched from one place to another by owners or slave traders. These troupes, sometimes called shipping lots before they were moved, ranged in size from fewer than a dozen to 200 or more enslaved people. Coffles were rarely mentioned in southern newspapers because they were so common that they were unworthy of remark; most descriptions of coffles come from the accounts of travelers from other parts of the country or world.

== History ==
In the southern United States before the Civil War, slave traders such as Franklin and Armfield arbitraged slave prices by purchasing slaves at low prices in Mid-Atlantic states such as Virginia, and then reselling them at a higher price in deep-south, especially in New Orleans, Louisiana, and in Natchez, Mississippi, at the Forks of the Road Market. Franklin and Armfield established slave pens near Alexandria, Virginia, to hold slaves, and when a sufficient number were gathered, some were transported by ship. Others were handcuffed to long chains in groups of 100 (a coffle) and force marched to the markets of the deep south, where they would be sold as slaves. Their professions were varied as some would be laborers, seamstresses, carpenters and "fancy girls", who would serve as sex slaves. The trader Austin Woolfolk reportedly wanted to collect nine or more enslaved people in a platoon before he began moving them from place to place. The slave traders rode horses, while the enslaved "women were tied together with a rope about their necks like a halter, while the men wore iron collars, fastened to a chain about a hundred feet long and were also handcuffed." An anonymized Virginian contributed this description to American Slavery As It Is:

The 'coffle chain' is a chain fastened at one end to the centre of the bar of a pair of hand cuffs, which are fastened to the right wrist of one, and the left wrist of another slave, they standing abreast, and the chain between them. These are the head of the coffle. The other end is passed through a ring in the bolt of the next handcufts, and the slaves being manacled thus, two and two together, walk up, and the coffle chain is passed, and they go up towards the head of the coffle. Of course they are closer or wider apart in the coffle, according to the number to be coffled, and to the length of the chain. I have seen HUNDREDS of droves and chain-coffles of this description, and every coffle was a scene of misery and wo, of tears and brokenness of heart.

A letter from Georgia written in 1833 described "During this and other days I have passed by many negro traders, who were crossing to Alabama. These negro traders, in order to save expense, usually carry their own provisions, and encamp out at night. Passing many of these encampments early in the morning, when they were just pitching tents, I have observed groups of negroes hand-cuffed, probably to prevent them from running away. The driver told us, that a thousand negroes had gone on his road to Alabama, the present spring."

J. K. Paulding, a noted writer, later U.S. Secretary of the Navy, and one of the most articulate and ardent defenders of American slavery, witnessed the following scene in Virginia in 1816, indicating that especially in the early 19th century, coffles might be a dozen or so enslaved individuals escorted by just one trader–overseer:

The sun was shining out very hot, and in turning an angle of the road we encountered the following group: first, a little cart drawn by one horse, in which five or six half-naked black children were tumbled like pigs together. The cart had no covering, and they seemed to have been actually broiled to sleep. Behind the cart marched three black women, with head, neck and breasts, uncovered, and without shoes or stockings; next came three men, bareheaded, half naked, and chained together with an ox chain! Last of all came a white man—a white man, Frank!—on horseback, pistols in his belt, with the impudence to look us in the face without blushing. I should like to have seen him hunted by blood-hounds. At a house where we stopped a little further on, we learned that he had bought these miserable beings in Maryland, and was marching them in this manner to some of the more southern States. Shame on the State of Maryland! I say—and shame on the State of Virginia! and every State through which this wretched cavalcade was permitted to pass. Do they expect that such exhibitions will not dishonor them in the eyes of strangers, however they may be reconciled to them by education and habit?

Sometimes coffles were prepared in advance, sometimes they were assembled or disassembled along the route of a particular trader. According to Plantation Slavery in Georgia (1933), "The daughter of Joseph Tooke, a prominent Houston County planter, recalls the annual visits of the speculator, with his gang of slaves, to their home; the Negroes would camp in a grove near the highway, Tooke would go down, inspect the slaves, and purchase those needed."

One memoirist recalled seeing a coffle in Mayslick, Kentucky, a "company of forty or fifty men, chained in the same manner as those mentioned before. There were some five or six wagons loaded with women and children. The foremost man looked to be about seventy years old, and he was singing 'Hark, from the Tomb.' Mrs. Ann Anderson, a white woman who was sitting at the window, could not help crying."

In 1844 Charles of Richmond, Virginia told the jailor of Robertson County, Tennessee that "his master was taking a drove of negroes to the lower country, perhaps Louisiana, and that he left his master some time after Christmas, and that there was about thirty in the drove; had a wagon and five horses in the team along." An account from 1847 blamed the annexation of Texas for a passage of a coffle out of Washington, D.C.: "The Slave Trade—Last Thursday forenoon at 11 o'clock a coffle of slaves to the number of eighty-five was marched from this city across the Long Bridge over the Potomac for the South. They consisted of men, women and children, the men chained together, some of the women carrying children walking with them, other women and children riding in two wagons which accompanied the train. Some were weeping, many were ragged, nearly all were barefoot, one was playing a fiddle—a not unfrequent accompaniment of such scenes! The coffle we presume was chiefly made up of slaves from the surrounding country in Maryland which seems as if emptying its slaves wholesale into the 'far South.' It is but two weeks since we had occasion to notice the departure of another coffle of one hundred slaves by the same route! The Annexation of Texas with Slavery is producing its legitimate fruit.—National Era 2nd."

== The Role of the Coffle in the Domestic Slave Trade ==
In the first half of the 19th century, the coffle was one of the most important means of transporting slaves in the domestic trade of the United States. After the importation of slaves from Africa was banned in 1808, slave traders transported thousands of people from the Upper South, such as Virginia and Maryland, to the Deep South, such as Alabama, Mississippi, and Louisiana. These forced transfers, often carried out as coffles, were part of what historians call the "Second Middle Passage" and caused widespread separation of slave families.

== Force Use of Music and Dance in Coffle ==
Some research has shown that slave traders sometimes forced people in coffle to sing, dance, or display cheerful behavior while moving. This behavior was not done for entertainment, but as a promotional method to show off the "health" of the slaves and increase their economic value in the sales markets. Researchers have also considered this behavior to be part of the system of mental control and public display of the slave trade.

== Resistance and Escape from the Coffle ==
Those trapped in the coffle were not the only passive victims. Historical sources report escape attempts, group resistance, suicide, and even attacks on guards along the transport routes. This resistance led slave traders to use heavier chains, handcuffs, shackles, and armed guards. Some of these events were also reflected in the political debates about the slave trade in the United States.

== See also ==
- Paris, Kentucky slave coffle of summer 1822

== Sources ==
- Flanders, Ralph Betts (1933). Plantation Slavery in Georgia. Chapel Hill, North Carolina: The University of North Carolina Press. LCCN 33037653. OCLC 9876467.
