= Mason County, Kentucky slave pen =

Slave pen on exhibit in Cincinnati, Ohio

Coordinates: 39.09790°N 84.51148°W

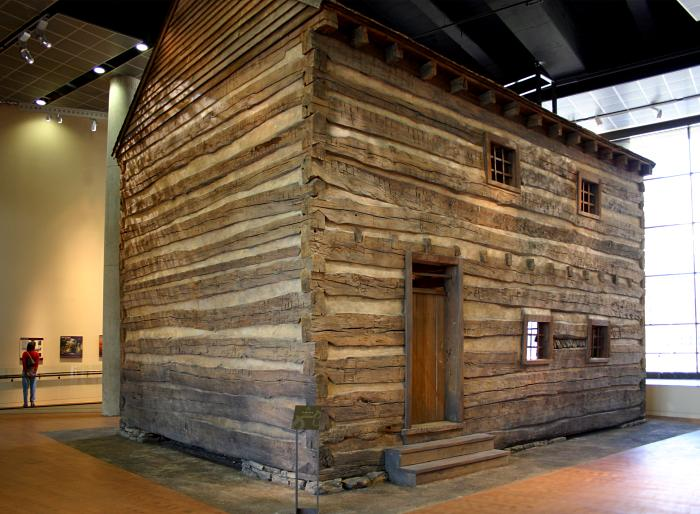
Slave pen at the National Underground Railroad Freedom Center.

The Mason County, Kentucky slave pen played a very important role in the American slave trade, confining slaves who were intended to go farther south for sale. This slave pen was recovered from a farm in Mason County, Kentucky, United States, which was owned by a slave trader named John W. Anderson, who played a significant part within the American domestic slave trade. Anderson bought his farmstead in 1825, and after several years he and his family built a mansion and converted the old house into slave quarters. In the early 1830s, he converted the slave quarters into a slave pen.

This slave pen has since been donated to the National Underground Railroad Freedom Center after being carefully taken apart and rebuilt by preservationists. It addresses the participation of individuals and institutions in the slave trade and the serves as a major centerpiece in the Freedom Center, demonstrating the importance of the Midwest in the slavery system.

== See also ==
- History of slavery in Kentucky
- Slave markets and slave jails in the United States
