= Edward Stone (slave trader) =

American speculator (~1782–1826)

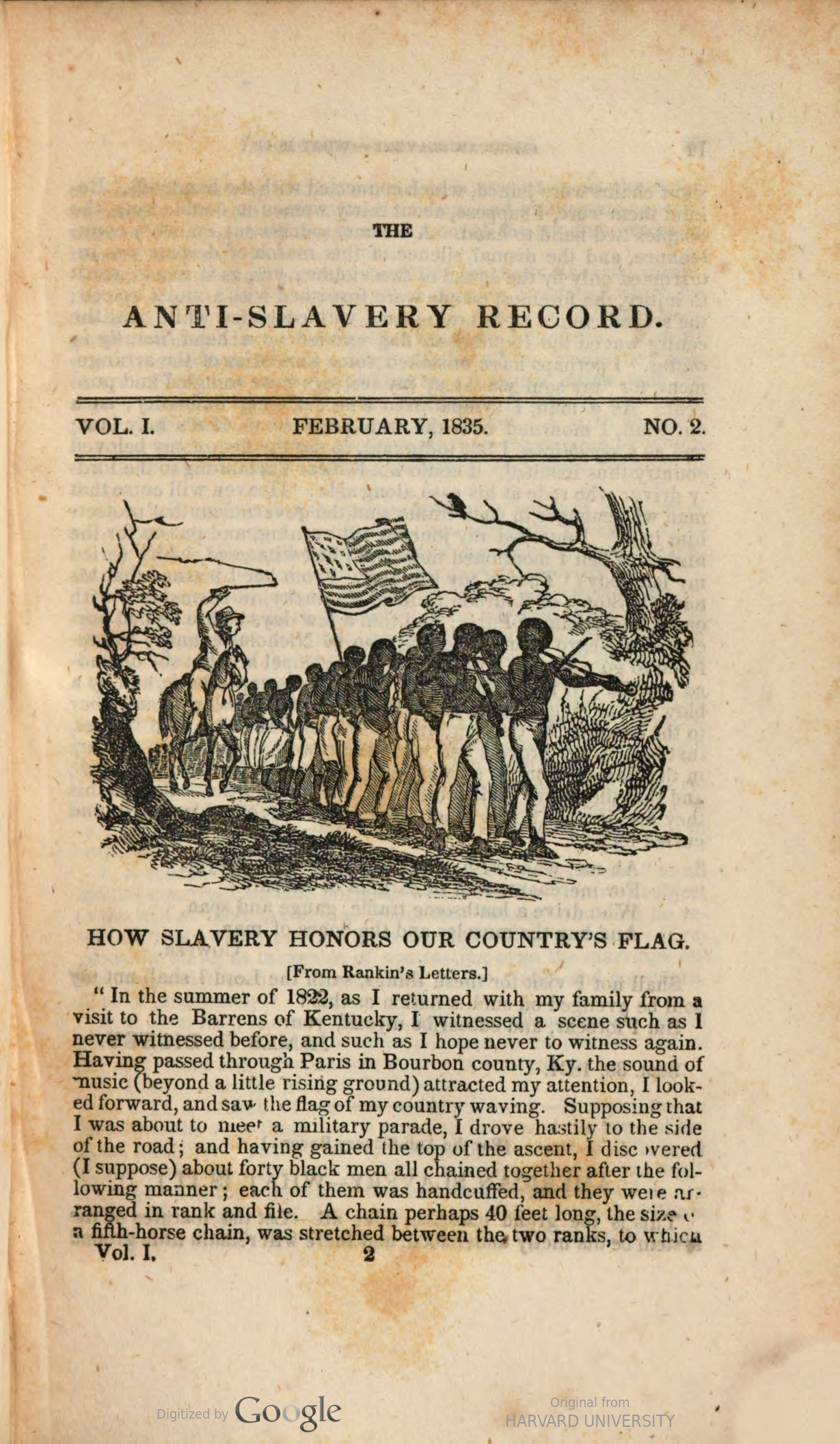
- Born: c. 1782; Virginia
- Died: September 17, 1826; Ohio River
- Occupation: Slave trader

Edward Stone (c. 1782 – September 17, 1826), also known as Ned Stone, was an American slave trader. He participated in the interregional slave trade between Maryland, Kentucky, Mississippi, and Louisiana. Stone had a slave jail under his house, the Grange, which was built in the 1810s near Paris, Kentucky. Stone was killed on the Ohio River in 1826 by slaves he was transporting south for sale.

== Biography ==
Edward Stone was originally from the Virginia Piedmont region and migrated to Bourbon County with three older brothers in the early 1800s. He began trading in slaves sometime before 1816. Stone was one of the handful of Kentucky slave traders who openly advertised early in the 19th century.

The Grange in Bourbon County, Kentucky was originally constructed to be his home. The early history of the house, located on the Lexington–Maysville Pike, was described in the 1973 application for the National Register of Historic Places:

Edward Stone began to build this splendid house in 1800. With his wife and eleven children he settled on his father's Revolutionary War land grant. At first they lived in a cabin while he built a kiln. After he built the kitchen and stables, they lived above the kitchen while building the rest of the house. After the foundation and cellar walls were formed they were allowed to settle for a couple of years to insure a firm foundation. After it was completed in 1816, Stone named it "Oakland". Underneath the entrance hall is a 24' x 12' masonry-walled room. The only ventilation is from an iron-barred window under the back porch in a two-foot thick wall. The doorway is 4' x 4' , raised 2 feet off the ground, and the door was solid iron. This room was the dungeon used in Stone's work as a slave trader...Following is an advertisement that Stone placed in the newspaper: "Cash For Negroes" - I wish to purchase twenty negroes, boys and girls from 10 to 25 years of age. A liberal price will be given for those answering the description on early application to the subscriber, Edward Stone. Living on the Limestone Road, 4 miles from Paris leading to Millersburg. (Western Citizen, July 24, 1816.)

According to Kentucky historian J. Winston Coleman, the Grange was a "fine example of Georgian architecture," and the basement dungeon consisted of "five or six strongly barred cells" for holding enslaved people prior to transport. According to a news article published in 1919, "Ingress to the dungeon is thru slanting doors to a cellar-like compartment, crossing which one comes to an opening in the wall, about three feet wide, four and a half feet high, and two feet from the floor. Within is Egyptian darkness, save for the faintest ray of light which filters thru a small barred aperture leading somewhere under the other part of the building. So black is the darkness that even with a lantern some time elapses after entering before the opposite walls can he discerned."

Stone also originally owned and likely built the neighboring Thomas Champ house, also known as Sulphur Spring. According to a history of the Maysville Road, "This house strongly resembles Rose Hill House [in Lexington] and The Grange in style."

In 1818, "Edw. Stone" of Flat Run, Bourbon County placed an ad in the local paper warning locals against "hunting, fowling, pulling down any of my plantation or woods pasture fencing, riding through, or in any manner, trespassing upon my plantation, as I am determined to prosecute, all who do it without liberty. Owners of Negroes had better give them ration, as they often ride after night." He was probably selling in Natchez that year with Jacob Jacoby, another Kentuckian, and Henry Turney.

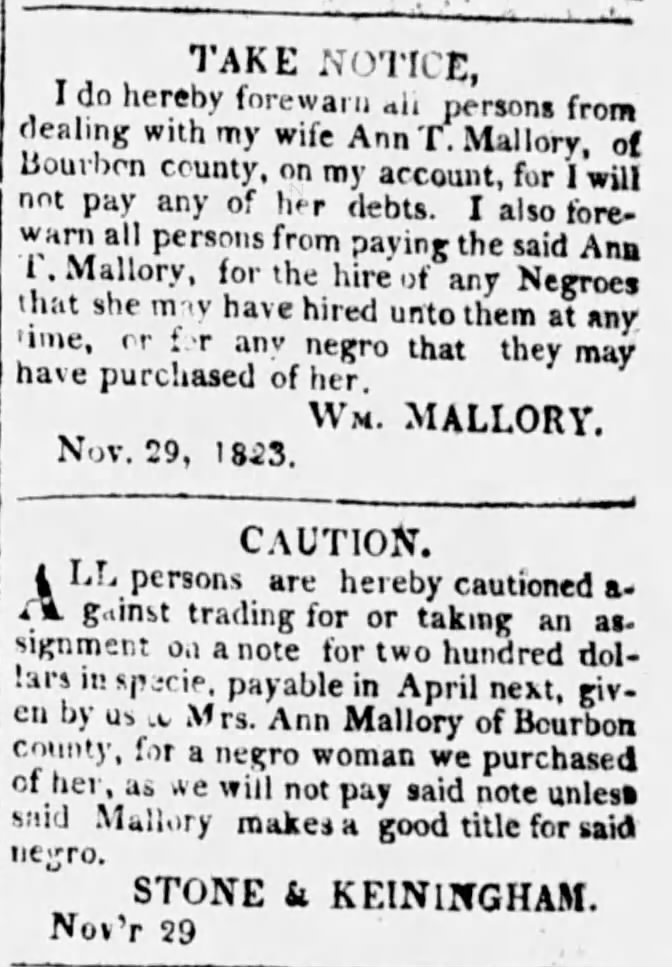
The Western Citizen. (November 29, 1823). Stone & Keiningham

The records of Concordia Parish, Louisiana show that Stone was selling there in 1820. In 1821 Stone and Thomas Phillips were partners in the slave trade. This business partnership with Thomas Phillips was concluded in 1823. One of their commercial enterprises was moving brown sugar from New Orleans to Kentucky. Stone was said to be one of the co-owners, with his partner at the time, Benjamin Keiningham, of the Paris, Kentucky slave coffle of summer 1822. In 1823, Stone listed for lease or sale the Indian Queen Hotel in Paris, Kentucky, preferring either "Land or Negroes" as the form of payment. The Indian Queen was more of a tavern than a hotel and was located at the corner of Main and Second in what was already a busy commercial center. In 1825 Kentucky slave trader John W. Anderson testified in a court case in Natchez, Mississippi, involving fight between Stone and a male slave.

In August 1826, Stone advertised for the recapture of a runaway slave. According to the African Americans of the Kentucky Borderlands database, Stone "placed a reward ad for the return of 22-yr-old Rowsley Peyton. Stone claimed that Peyton and his brother (unnamed) escaped on the night of August 22, stopping to steal horses and goods on their way. Rowley's brother was captured. Rowsley was born in Stafford County, Virginia where he was held by Mr. Kendall; he was literate."

== 1826 Ohio River slave rebellion ==
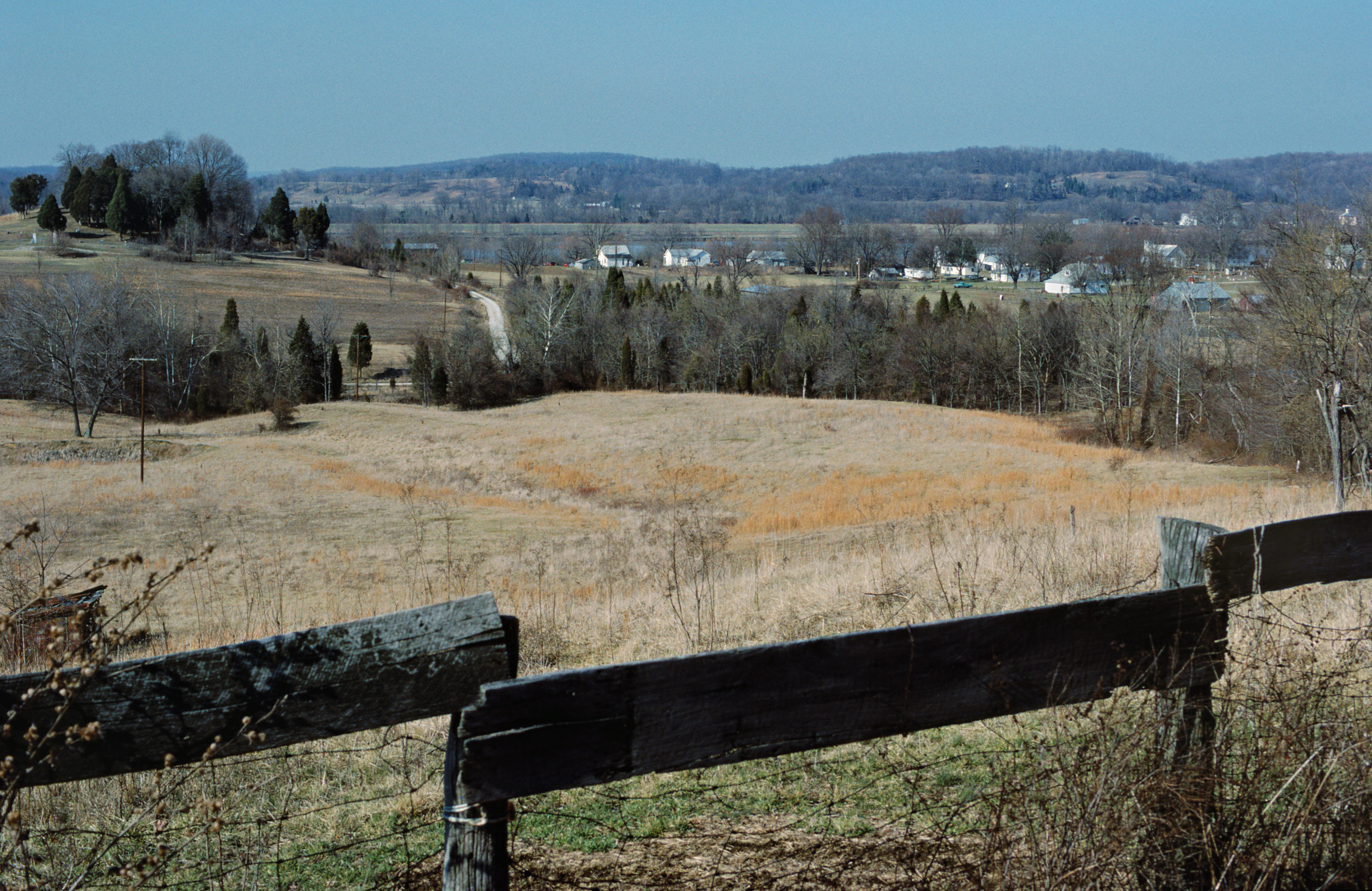
View of the Ohio River from near Stephensport, Kentucky (1988)

Stone, his nephew Howard Stone, and three other whites were killed on the Ohio River in 1826 by the people he was trafficking south. The news report about his slaying, now known as the 1826 Ohio River slave revolt, read as follows:

Information reached Louisville on Friday last of the murder of five white men by a gang of slaves on board of a flat boat in the river, about 100 miles below that place. They were owned by Howard and Edward Stone of Bourbon, who with David Cobb of Lexington, and a man named James Gray were conveying them to the Mississippi country for sale. These are the individuals that have been murdered. The fifth victim was a Mr. Davis who had taken his passage on board the boat at Louisville. The gang of slaves consisted of 75 in number, males and females, and of various ages; 56 of them have been lodged in the jail of Breckinridge county at Hardinsburgh. They were taken in Indiana. One of the unfortunate individuals, it is said, who was on deck when the butchery commenced below, swam from the boat to the shore, but was pursued and despatched. Some of the slaves had been lately purchased in Maryland.

== Legacy ==
Stone was buried in the Baptist Cemetery at Stephensport, Kentucky. His marker reads "In memory of Edward Stone, who departed this life Sept. the 17th, 1826, in the 44th year of his age." According to a cemetery reading done in 1927, "A stone lying beside this one has cut ornately upon it $9-25!" Stone's personal servant, a mixed race man named Lewis "with unswerving devotion and in the face of great odds, fought for his master to the last, 'and narrowly, and with great injury escaped his fate.' He was left beside Stone for dead, but recovered and returned to Paris with some of his master's personal effects. For his valor he was liberated, given a small tract of land with a cabin, where he passed the remainder of his days in sight of his master's old home."

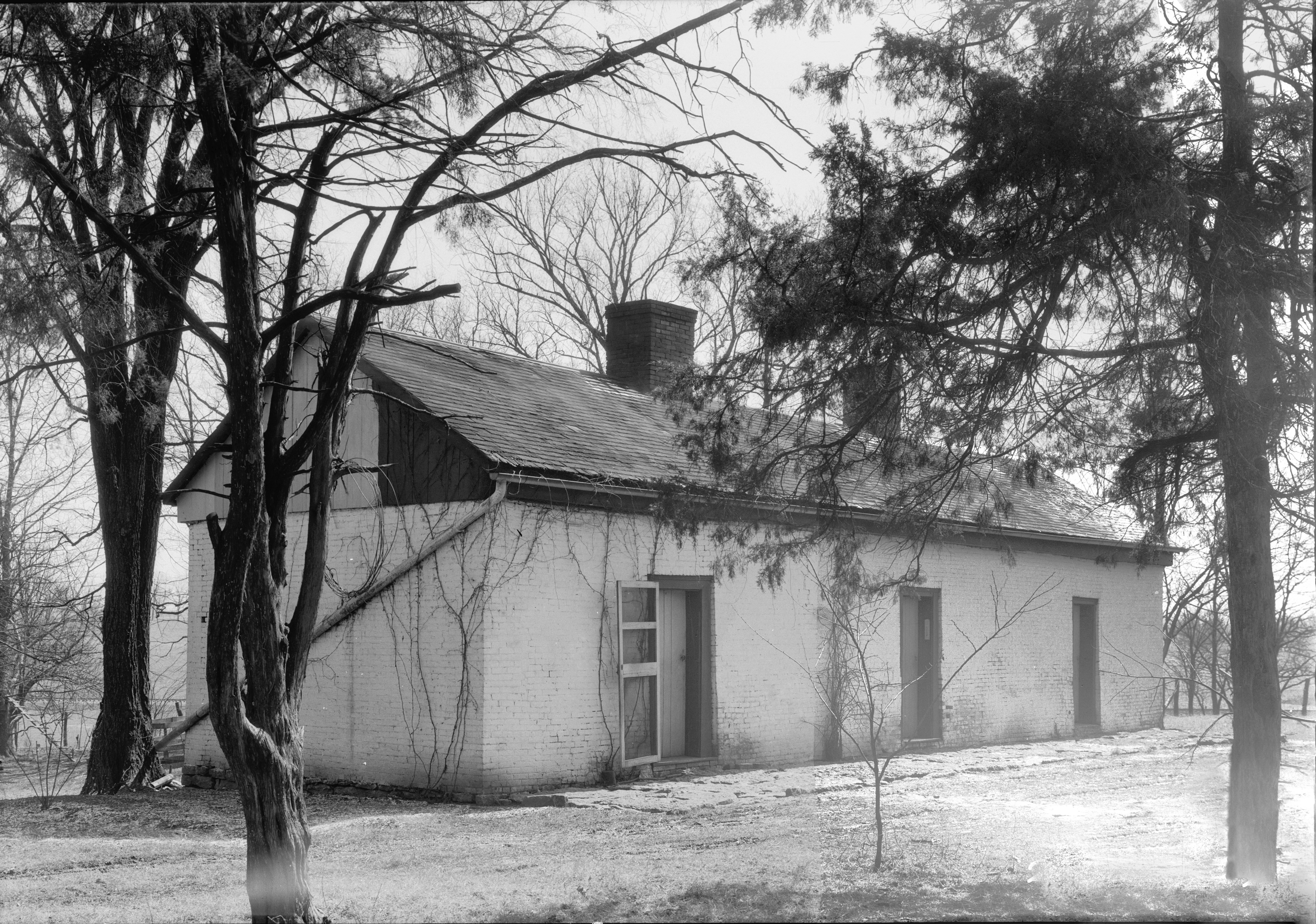
The old slave quarters at the Grange, photographed 1934 for HABS

The executor of Edward Stone's estate was his brother Kinzea Stone, who listed property for sale in December 1826. The first listing advertised "407 Acres, with an elegant brick Dwelling house. with six rooms & a passage, a porch on one side and portico on the other, a brick kitchen and smoke house and Negro house, all of brick, and finished off in the best manner, a brick stable thirty by sixty feet, all of the buildings new, with a never failing spring and stock water, a plenty, all times in the year Flat-run runs through the land. This land lies 4 miles from Paris with the Limestone road running through the land, about 150 acres cleared, the balance well timbered all under a good fence and well set in grass." The second listing advertised two farms for rent, as well as the sale of 50 barrels of corn, 19 shoats, one hiefer, and "3 negroes," as well as other miscellaneous items that had been "left at the former sale." The brick building for housing slaves was slightly innovative according to a late 20th-century architectural historian: "Some planters even saw the double-pen cabin as the quintessential slave house and created new types of slave buildings by manipulating the double-pen form. At The Grange outside of Millersburg, Kentucky, for example, Edward Stone built a triple-pen house to serve as the quarter for his domestic slaves; it is a double-pen cabin plus an additional room."

After Stone's murder, John W. Anderson "took over the northern region's major slavetrading operations." Stone had had operations in Harrison County as well as in Bourbon County, while Anderson was based in Mason County "with its tobacco-based economy [which had] established the earliest recorded domestic slave-trading market in Kentucky at Washington, which is located on a hill above Maysville."

== See also ==
- Adam Crosswhite – Slavery survivor (1799–1878)
- List of slave traders of the United States
- Slave markets and slave jails in the United States
- Bibliography of the slave trade in the United States
- Maysville Road veto
- Andrew Jackson and the slave trade in the United States

== Sources ==
- Beckner, Lucien (1927). "Miscellaneous: Epitaphs on Monuments at Old Graves in Breckinridge County". Register of the Kentucky State Historical Society. 25 (75): 326–327. ISSN 2328-8183. JSTOR 23370161.
- Coleman, J. Winston (1940). Slavery times in Kentucky. Chapel Hill, N.C.: University of North Carolina Press. pp. 142–217.
- Coon, Diane Perrine (2009). "Slavery". In Claypool, James C.; Tenkotte, Paul A. (eds.). The Encyclopedia of Northern Kentucky. The University Press of Kentucky. pp. 834–836. ISBN 978-0-8131-2565-7. LCCN 2009027969. Project MUSE book 37469.
- Jones, William D. (2021). "Beyond New Orleans: Forced Migrations To, From, and In Louisiana, 1820–1860". Louisiana History: The Journal of the Louisiana Historical Association. 62 (4): 429–468. ISSN 0024-6816. JSTOR 27095320.
- Raitz, Karl B.; O'Malley, Nancy (2012). Kentucky's Frontier Highway: Historical Landscapes Along the Maysville Road. Lexington, Kentucky: The University Press of Kentucky. ISBN 978-0-8131-3664-6. LCCN 2012032833. Project MUSE book 18296.
- Vlach, John Michael (1995). ""Snug Li'l House with Flue and Oven": Nineteenth-Century Reforms in Plantation Slave Housing". Perspectives in Vernacular Architecture. 5: 118–129. doi:10.2307/3514250. JSTOR 3514250.
- Westmoreland, Carl B. (2015). "Article 3: The John W. Anderson Slave Pen". Freedom Center Journal. 2015 (1). University of Cincinnati College of Law. ISSN 1942-5856.
