= The Grange (Paris, Kentucky) =

Historic house in Kentucky, United States

- U.S. National Register of Historic Places
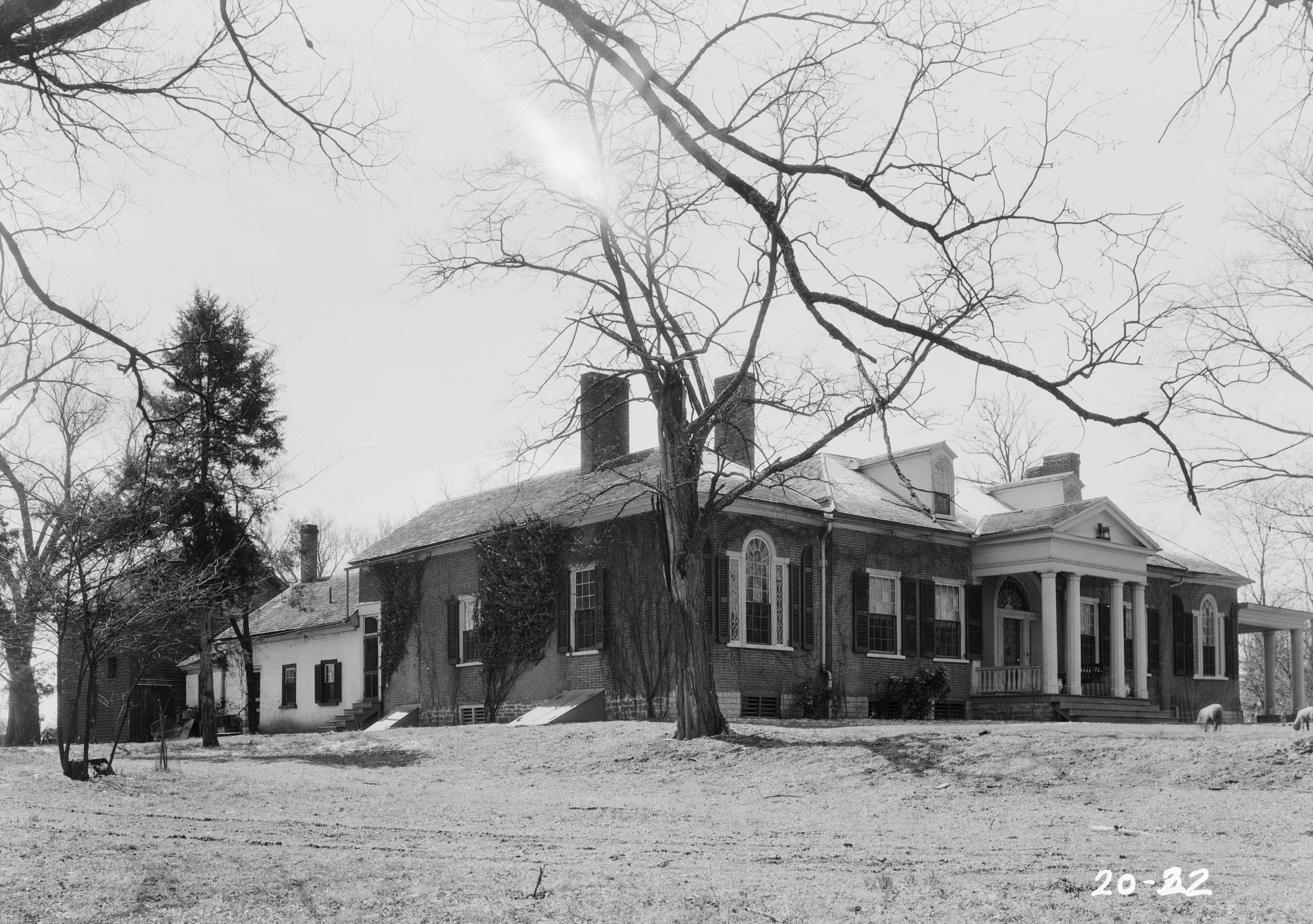

- Location within Kentucky Location within the United States
- Nearest city: Paris, Kentucky
- Coordinates: 38°15′13″N 84°11′50″W
- Area: 38 acres (15 ha)
- Built: 1800 or c.1818
- Built by: Edward Stone
- Architectural style: Federal
- NRHP reference No.: 73000786
- Added to NRHP: April 11, 1973

The Grange, located four miles north of Paris in Bourbon County, Kentucky, United States, was built around 1818, in the Federal style of architecture. It was listed on the National Register of Historic Places in 1973.

It was built as a house for Ned Stone, a slave dealer who eventually was killed in a slave mutiny on an Ohio River flatboat. The house was destroyed by a fire on November 11, 2021.
