= John Rankin (abolitionist) =

American Presbyterian minister, educator and abolitionist

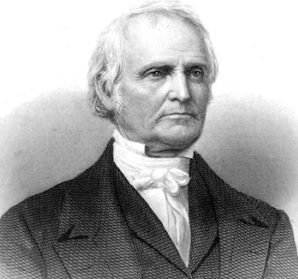
Frontispiece of 1870's The Soldier, the Battle, and the Victory

John Rankin (February 4, 1793 – March 18, 1886) was an American Presbyterian minister, educator and abolitionist. Upon moving to Ripley, Ohio, in 1822, he became known as one of Ohio's first and most active "conductors" on the Underground Railroad. Prominent pre-Civil War abolitionists William Lloyd Garrison, Theodore Weld, Henry Ward Beecher, and Harriet Beecher Stowe were influenced by Rankin's writings and work in the anti-slavery movement.

When Henry Ward Beecher was asked after the end of the Civil War, "Who abolished slavery?," he answered, "Reverend John Rankin and his sons did."

== Early career ==
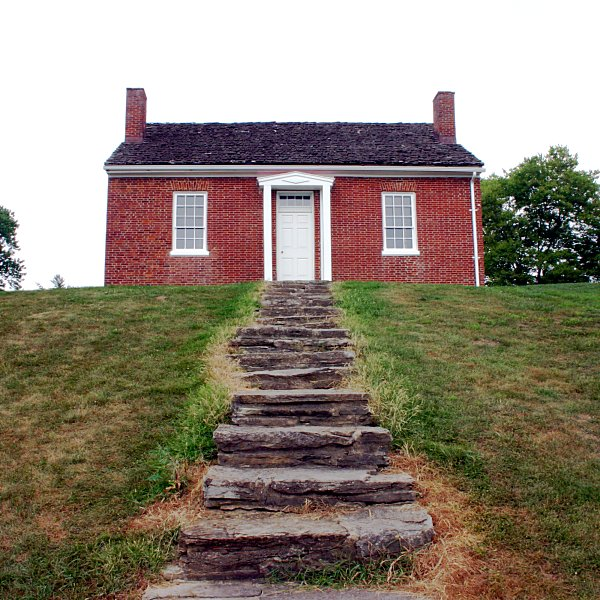
The Rankin House, on Liberty Hill in Ripley, Ohio

Rankin was born at Dandridge, Jefferson County, Tennessee, to Richard and Jane (Steele) Rankin, and raised in a strict Calvinist home. His parents were literate, which was unusual in a remote area. They were staunch Presbyterians, and their children had a religious upbringing. Jane was an unyielding opponent of slavery.

Beginning at the age of eighteen, John's view of the world and his religious faith were deeply affected by two things — the revivals of the Second Great Awakening that were sweeping through the Appalachian region, and the incipient slave rebellion led by Gabriel Prosser in 1800.

John's school had log walls and an earthen floor. He was able to enroll in Washington College Academy, under the direction of Rev. Samuel Doak, an avowed abolitionist; he graduated in 1816. After graduation he was minister of the Abingdon Presbytery, but because his anti-slavery views were not welcome he left Tennessee in 1817, never to return.

Not a natural public speaker, Rankin worked hard while at Jefferson County Presbyterian Church simply to deliver an effective sermon. Within a few months, however, despite Tennessee's status as a slave state, he summoned the courage to speak against "all forms of oppression" and then, specifically, slavery. He was one of the founders of the Tennessee Manumission Society, in 1815. He was shocked when his elders responded by telling him that he should consider leaving Tennessee if he intended ever to oppose slavery from the pulpit again. He knew that his faith would not allow him to keep his views to himself, so he decided in 1817 to move his family to the town of Ripley, across the Ohio River in the free state of Ohio, where he had heard from family members that a number of anti-slavery Virginians had settled.

On the way north, Rankin stopped to preach at Lexington and Paris, Kentucky, and learned about the need for a minister at Concord Presbyterian Church in Carlisle, Kentucky. The congregation had been involved in anti-slavery activities as far back as 1807, when they and twelve other churches formed the Kentucky Abolition Society, and Rankin's deepening anti-slavery views were nurtured there by his listeners. He remained for four years and started a school for slaves; within a year, however, they were driven first from a schoolhouse to an empty house, and then to his friend's kitchen by club-carrying mobs, and the students finally stopped coming. Spurred by a financial crisis in the area, Rankin decided to complete his family's journey to Ripley. On the night of December 31, 1821 – January 1, 1822, he rowed his family across the icy river. In Ripley he founded a Presbyterian academy for boys, which Ulysses S. Grant attended in 1838.

== Ripley and the Underground Railroad ==
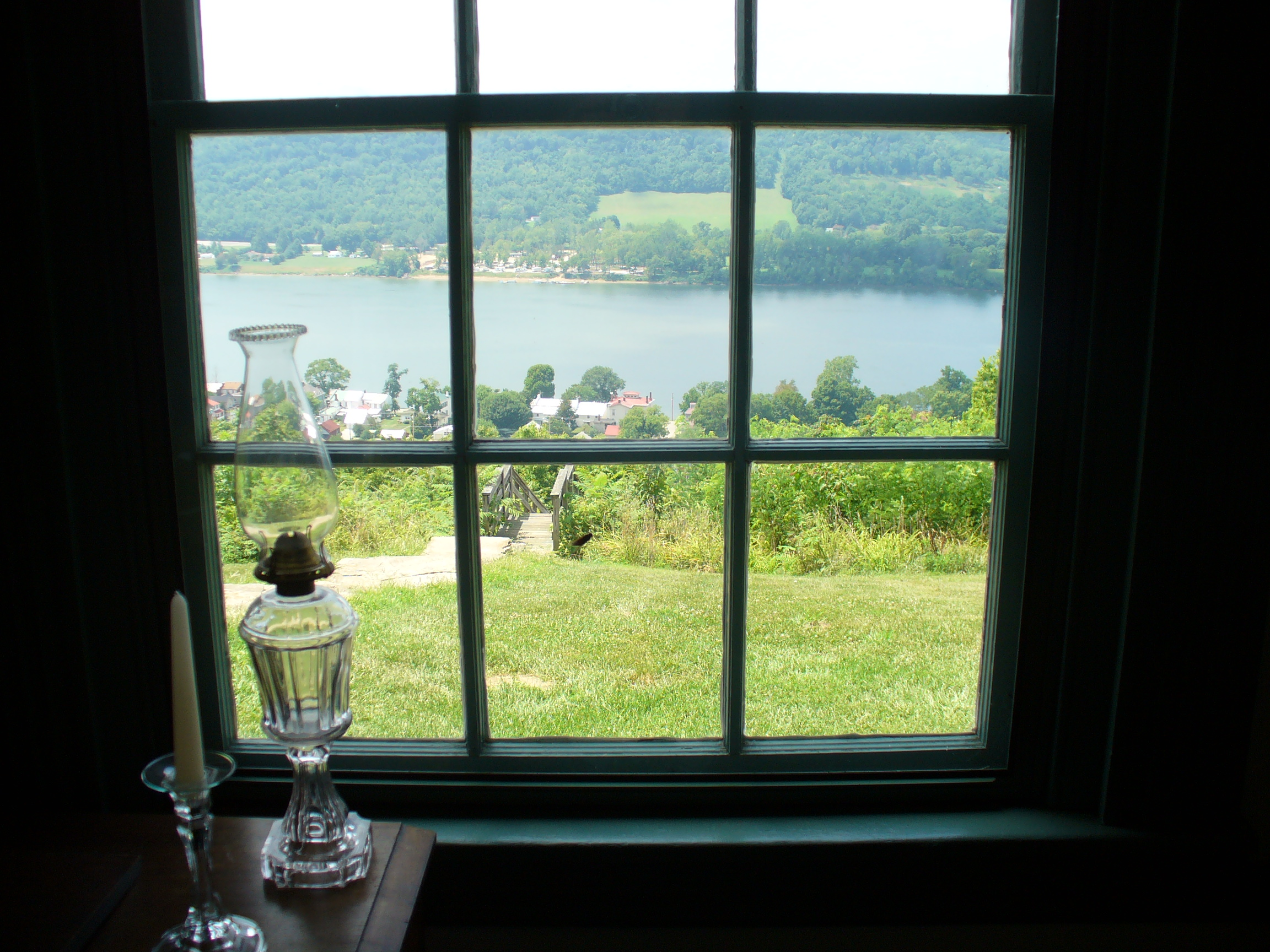
View from a window in the Rankin house. The Kentucky shoreline is visible on the far side of the Ohio River.

In 1822, Ripley was a town of frequent street fights and shootouts, where the most common type of business was a saloon. During the Rankins' first few months there, hecklers and protesters often followed the new preacher through town and gathered outside his cabin while their first permanent home was being built, just yards from the river at 220 Front Street. When the local newspaper began publishing his letters to his brother on the topic of slavery (see next section), Rankin's reputation grew among both supporters and opponents of the anti-slavery movement. Slave owners and hunters often viewed him as their prime suspect and appeared at his door at all hours demanding information about fugitives. Soon, Rankin realized that the home was too accessible a place for him to properly raise his family.

In 1829, Rankin moved his wife and nine children (of an eventual total of thirteen) to a house at the top of a 540 feet (160 m)-high hill that provided a wide view of the village, the river, and the Kentucky shore, as well as farmland and fruit groves that could provide sources of income. One of the sons was Adam Lowry Rankin, who founded the Tulare Congregational church in California in 1874. Folklore associated with the Rankin home suggested that a lantern or candle was placed in the front window to guide♆ runaway slaves from across the Ohio River, in Mason County, Kentucky. However, ex-slave narrative recalls a pole with a light. This is a more plausible means of being seen based on the proximity of the house to the river. From there the family could raise a lantern on a flagpole to signal fleeing slaves in Kentucky when it was safe for them to cross into the free state of Ohio. Rankin also constructed a staircase leading up the hill to the house for slaves to climb up to safety on their way further north. For over forty years leading up to the Civil War, many of the slaves who escaped to freedom through Ripley stayed at the family's home. According to him, "I have had under my roof as many as twelve fugitive slaves at a time, all of whom made good their way to Victoria's dominions [Canada]," sometimes entire families. It became known as the Rankin House and is now a US National Historic Landmark (see photos).

=== The real Eliza ===
During a visit by Rankin to Lane Seminary in Cincinnati to see one of his sons, he told Professor Calvin Stowe the story of a woman the Rankins had housed in 1838 after she escaped by crossing the frozen Ohio River with her child in her arms. Stowe's wife (Harriet Beecher Stowe) also heard the account and later modeled the character Eliza in her book Uncle Tom's Cabin after the woman.

=== Film depiction ===
Brothers of the Borderland, a film that depicts Rankin's work in the Underground Railroad in Ripley, is a permanent feature of the National Underground Railroad Freedom Center, in Cincinnati, Ohio.

== Letters on Slavery ==
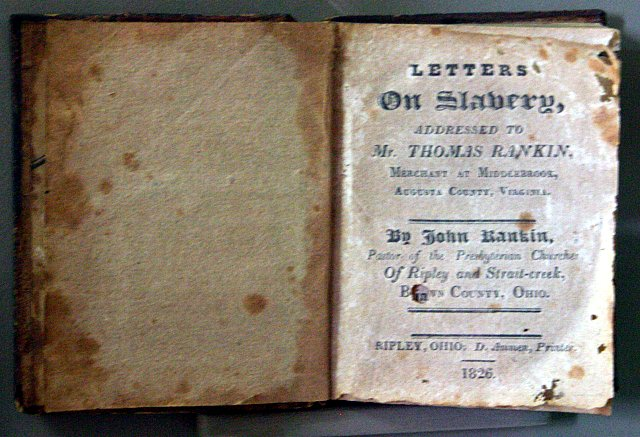
A copy of John Rankin's book, Letters On Slavery, published in 1826

Early in his time in Ripley, Rankin learned that his brother Thomas, a merchant in Augusta County, Virginia, had purchased slaves. He was provoked to write a series of anti-slavery letters to his brother that were published by the editor of the local Ripley newspaper The Castigator. When the letters were published in book form in 1826 as Letters on Slavery, they provided one of the first clearly articulated anti-slavery views printed west of the Appalachians. Thomas Rankin, convinced by his brother's words, moved to Ohio in 1827 and freed his slaves. By the 1830s, Letters on Slavery had become standard reading for abolitionists all over the United States. In 1832, William Lloyd Garrison printed the letters in his anti-slavery newspaper, The Liberator. Garrison later called Rankin his "anti-slavery father," saying that "his book on slavery was the cause of my entering the anti-slavery conflict."

== Beyond the pulpit ==
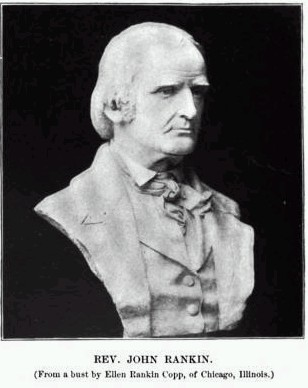
Bust of Reverend John Rankin made by his granddaughter, the sculptor Ellen Rankin Copp

In 1833 Rankin came to know Theodore Weld through their involvement in the creation of the American Anti-Slavery Society. Weld had come from Connecticut, by way of Oneida County, New York, to attend Lane Seminary in Cincinnati, Ohio. Rankin attended the debates on slavery organized by Weld at Lane in February 1834, and published a pamphlet on its consequences.

In November 1834, at Rankin's Ripley church, Weld began a year-long series of speeches throughout Ohio that raised the profile of the abolitionist movement in the state; at his urging Rankin did likewise. Many local anti-slavery societies were founded.

in April 1835 an Ohio Anti-slavery Society was formed, at whose initial meeting in Putnam, Ohio (today Zanesville), both Rankin and Weld played key roles.

On his way home, Rankin had his first real experience with mob opposition to his efforts, as he was showered with rotten eggs. When he stopped in Chillicothe to speak at a church, stones were thrown through a window.

In 1836, Weld invited Rankin to join a group called "the Seventy", who were selected by the American Anti-Slavery Society to travel to churches throughout the Northern states preaching immediate emancipation ("immediatism") and forming local anti-slavery societies. Released by his congregation for one year to participate in the effort, Rankin's passion for the cause grew with the opposition to his "dangerous" views, even among many who opposed slavery but feared provoking a slave uprising. A bounty of up to $3,000 was placed on his life, and in 1841 he and his sons had to fight off attackers who came to burn his house and barn in the middle of the night.

Ulysses S. Grant was a student at Rankin's Presbyterian Academy in Ripley in the fall of 1838. Grant entered the U. S. Military Academy in 1839.

The passage of the Fugitive Slave Law of 1850 heightened the danger and profile of their assistance to runaways as it was now illegal to do so, even in free states. At an anti-slavery society meeting in Highland County, Ohio, held by Rankin and Salmon P. Chase, however, Rankin declared that "Disobedience to the enactment is obedience to God."

Opposition within his own congregation, spurred by Rankin's attempts to expel slave-owners from the church, finally led him to resign in 1846 after 24 years as minister of the Ripley Presbyterian Church. Over one-third of the church's members left with him and helped Rankin establish what eventually came to be the Free Presbyterian Church, which may have had as many as 72 congregations before the coming of the Civil War. After the war, Rankin welcomed the reunion of the Presbyterian churches in Ripley. In 1924, when the cupola of the Ripley Presbyterian Church, was removed because it was deemed structurally unsound, news accounts had it that the cupola had been either a shelter for fugitive slaves or a signal tower or a lookout point or all three.

== "Freedom's Heroes" ==
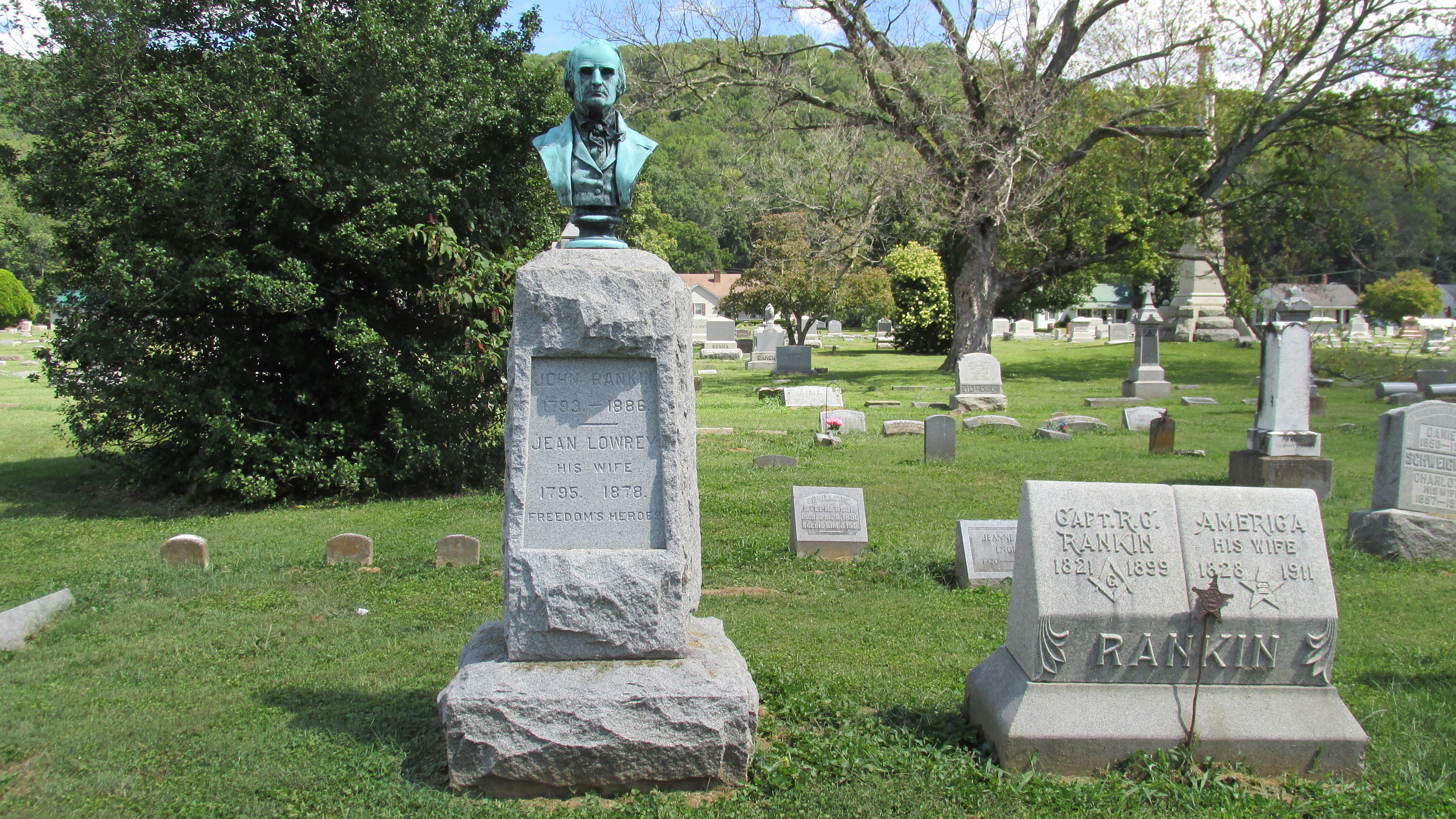
Rankin's grave at Maplewood Cemetery in Ripley

In May 1892, six years after John Rankin's death, a monument aptly named "Freedom's Heroes", was dedicated to Rankin and his wife, Jean Lowry Rankin, on the grounds of the Maplewood Cemetery in Ripley, Ohio.

== National Abolition Hall of Fame ==
Rankin was a 2013 Inductee into the National Abolition Hall of Fame in Peterboro, New York.

== Writings ==
- Rankin, John (1811). A remedy for universalism : a comprehensive defence of the doctrine of future and endless punishment. Cincinnati. OCLC 936386232.
- Rankin, John (1826). Letters on slavery, addressed to Mr. Thomas Rankin, merchant at Middlebrook, Augusta County, Virginia. Ripley, Ohio. OCLC 13221793.
  - Rankin, John (1833). Letters on American Slavery, addressed to Mr. Thomas Rankin, merchant at Middlebrook, Augusta Co., Va. Boston: Garrison and Knapp.
  - Rankin, John (1836). Letters on American Slavery, addressed to Mr. Thomas Rankin, merchant at Middlebrook, Augusta Co., Va (2nd ed.). Newburyport, Massachusetts: Charles Whipple.
  - Rankin, John (1838). Letters on American Slavery, addressed to Mr. Thomas Rankin, merchant at Middlebrook, Augusta Co., Va (5th ed.). Boston: Isaac Knapp.
- Rankin, John (1830). A sermon on the divinity of the Savior. West Union, Ohio. OCLC 47153765.
- Rankin, John (1835). A review of the statement of the faculty of Lane seminary, in relation to the recent difficulties in that institution. Ripley, Ohio: The author.
- Rankin, John; Thome, James A. (1836). Report of the first anniversary of the Ohio Anti-slavery Society : held near Granville, on the twenty-seventh and twenty-eighth of April, 1836. Cincinnati: Ohio Anti-Slavery Society. OCLC 224956762.
- Rankin, John (1836). An address to the churches in relation to slavery : delivered at the first aniversary [sic] of the Ohio State [sic] Anti-slavery Society. Medina, Ohio: Ohio Anti-Slavery Society. OCLC 841409108.
- Rankin, John; Ohio Anti-slavery Society (1838). Report of the third anniversary of the Ohio Anti-Slavery Society, held in Granville, Licking County, Ohio, on the 30th of May, 1838. Cincinnati.
- Rankin, John (1840). A present to families: a practical work on the covenant of grace, as given to Abraham. Designed to promote family religion. Ripley, Ohio: C. Edwards.
- Rankin, John (1841). An antidote for Unitarianism: A comprehensive defence of the Doctrine of the Trinity, the Divinity of Christ, the Personality and Deity of the Holy Spirit, the original and total Depravity of Man, the necessity of the agency of the Spirit to Renew the heart, the Substitution of Christ for his people, and Justification by his Righteousness. Adapted to the capacity of all classes of readers. Cincinnati: Weed and Wilson.
- Rankin, John (c. 1854). A short memoir of Samuel Donnell, Esq. Cincinnati: American Reform Tract and Book Society.

== Archival material ==
Archival material on Rankin is held by the Ohio Historical Society, Columbus.

== See also ==
- Paris, Kentucky slave coffle of summer 1822

== Bibliography ==
- Hagedorn, Ann, Beyond The River: The Untold Story of the Heroes of the Underground Railroad. Simon & Schuster, 2002. ISBN 0-684-87065-7
- Waugh, Joan (2009). U. S. Grant. University of North Carolina Press. ISBN 978-0-8078-3317-9.
- Willey, Larry G. (Fall 1994). "John Rankin, Antislavery Prophet, and the Free Presbyterian Church". American Presbyterians. 72 (3): 157–171. JSTOR 23333630.
