= John Rankin House (Ripley, Ohio) =

Historic house in Ohio, United States

- U.S. National Register of Historic Places
- U.S. National Historic Landmark
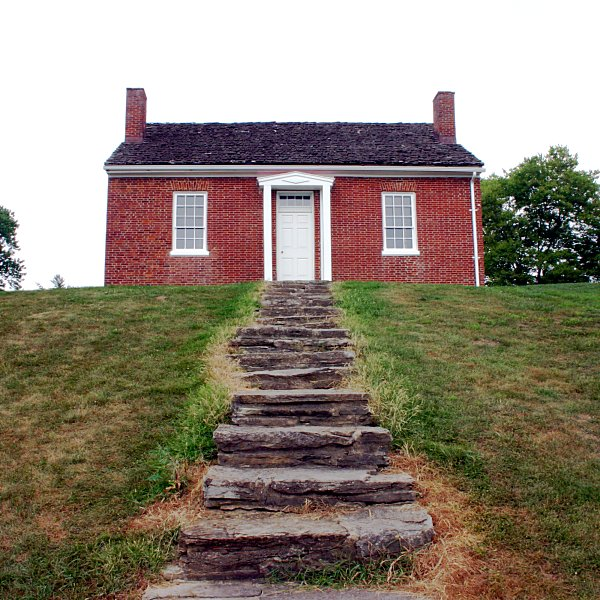

- Location within Ohio Location within the United States
- Location: 6152 Rankin Hill Rd., Ripley, Ohio
- Coordinates: 38°45′4″N 83°50′32″W
- Area: 20 acres (8.1 ha)
- Built: 1828
- NRHP reference No.: 70000485

Significant dates
- Added to NRHP: November 10, 1970
- Designated NHL: February 18, 1997

The John Rankin House is a historic house museum at 6152 Rankin Hill Road in Ripley, Ohio. Built in 1828, it was home to Presbyterian abolitionist John Rankin, and was one of the original stops on the Underground Railroad. Harriet Beecher Stowe's visit to Rankin provided some of the story that became Uncle Tom's Cabin. The house was acquired by the State of Ohio in 1938 and is now operated by the Ohio History Connection and opened for tours. It was designated a National Historic Landmark in 1997.

== Description and history ==
The John Rankin House occupies a prominent position on a hill overlooking the town of Ripley and the Ohio River. It is set on about 20 acres (8.1 ha), accessed via a drive and visitors center off Rankin Hill Road (County Road 556). The house is a modest 1 1/2-story brick structure, with a side-facing gabled roof. The main facade is three bays wide, with a center entrance flanked by sash windows in rectangular openings. The entry is sheltered by a portico with a shallow-pitch gable roof and square posts. The interior follows a typical center hall plan, with four rooms on the ground floor and two small bedrooms in the attic level. The interior retains original features and finishes, including wide floor boards and carved fireplace surrounds.

The house was built in 1828 by the abolitionist Presbyterian minister John Rankin, and it is where he raised a large family. It also became a significant stopping point for fugitive slaves who had crossed the river from Kentucky, a slave state, often under guidance from a "conductor" on the Underground Railroad. Rankin is estimated to have assisted in securing the freedom of more than 2,000 slaves, often at great personal risk. The house was often under surveillance by slave catchers, and some slave owners had placed a price on his head. The Rankins sold the house after the American Civil War, and it was purchased by the state in 1938 for use as a historic site.

== See also ==
- John P. Parker House, owned by another conductor on the Underground Railroad in Ripley
- List of Underground Railroad sites
- List of National Historic Landmarks in Ohio
