= Jean Lowry Rankin =

American abolitionist

Jean Lowry Rankin (1795–1877) was an American abolitionist and pioneer in the anti-slavery movement. With her husband John Rankin, she assisted 2000 slaves in their journey to freedom along the Underground Railroad. The Rankin family home on the Ohio River in Ripley, Ohio is now the John Rankin House State Memorial, owned by the Ohio Historical Society. Her son, Adam Lowry Rankin was a chaplain in the 113th Illinois infantry. Reverend Adam Lowry Rankin moved west after the civil war and founded the first church in Tulare California, the Church of the Redeemer in 1873.

An incident in which an escaped slave fled with her infant child across the frozen Ohio River and took refuge in the home of John and Jean Lowry Rankin was the inspiration for the fictional character of Eliza in the classic anti-slavery novel Uncle Tom's Cabin by Harriet Beecher Stowe.
