= John W. Anderson (slave trader) =

Kentucky trafficker and farmer (1801?–1836)

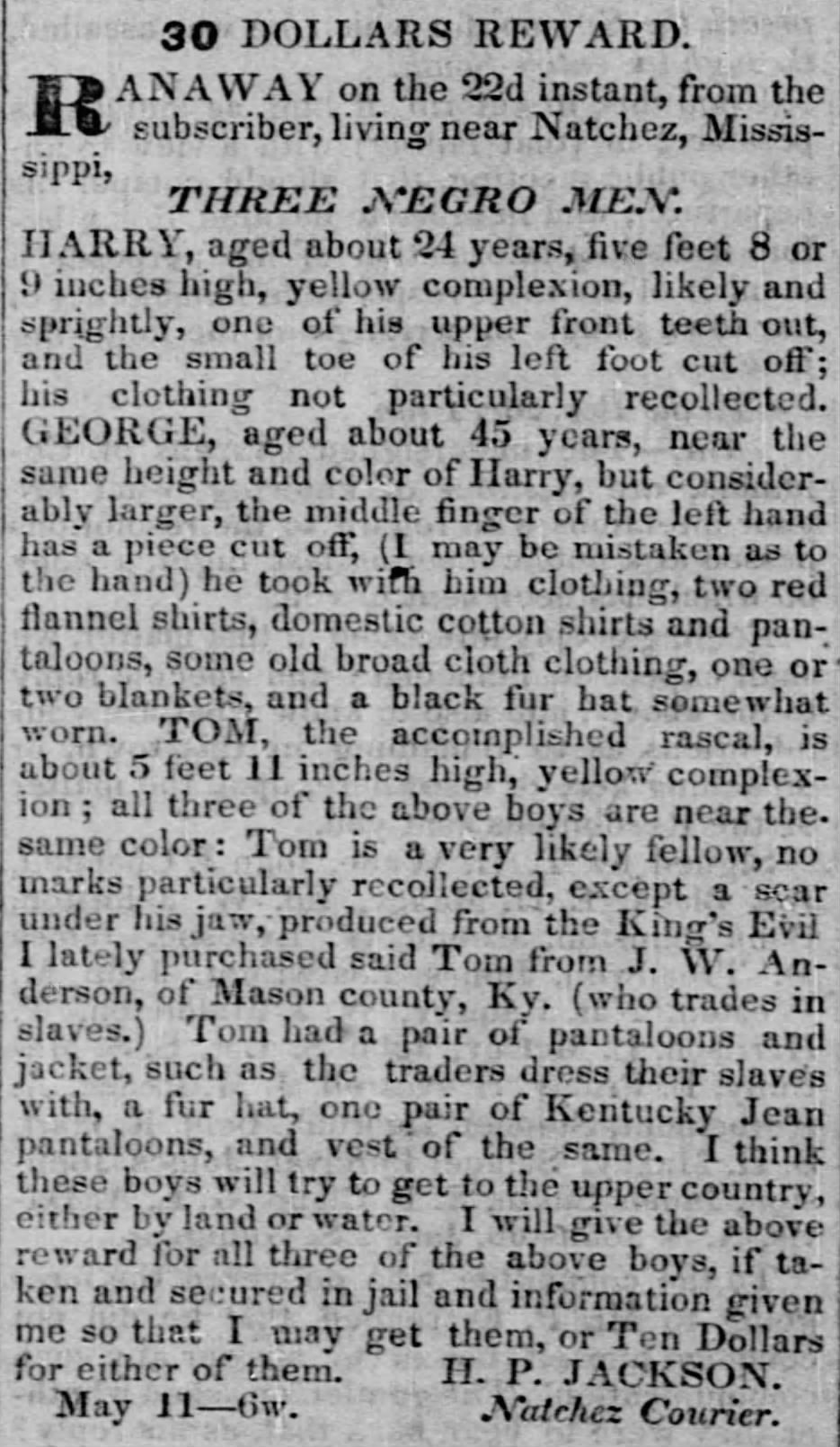
- Born: Virginia, U.S.
- Died: September 20, 1836; Mason County, Kentucky
- Occupations: Slave trader, farmer

John W. Anderson (1801?–September 20, 1836) was an American interstate slave trader and farmer based near Maysville, Mason County, Kentucky. Chief Justice of the United States John Marshall was an investor who funded Anderson's slave speculations. Anderson was involved in the establishment of the Forks of the Road slave market in 1833. Anderson was elected to the Kentucky General Assembly in 1836 but died before he could take office. A log-built slave jail established on Anderson's property is now on exhibit in the National Underground Railroad Freedom Center and is believed to be the only surviving rural American slave jail in existence.

== Biography ==
Anderson was probably a Virginian from Amelia County.

He may have initially been involved in tobacco production and shipment, but soon added slave trading as an additional source of income. In 1825 he was able to purchase 100 acres near what is now Walton Pike and Kentucky Route 9 in Mason County, Kentucky. Here he built or converted a log-hewn building for use as a slave jail, where he could sequester slaves before taking them down to the Dover, Kentucky, boat landing and shipping them south by pole-guided flatboat, or later steamboat, to the cotton kingdom markets of Natchez and New Orleans. He was fronted tens of thousands of dollars for slave speculation by his neighbor Thomas Marshall III, and his neighbor's first cousin, Chief Justice John Marshall. He also began investing in thoroughbred race horses during the 1820s.

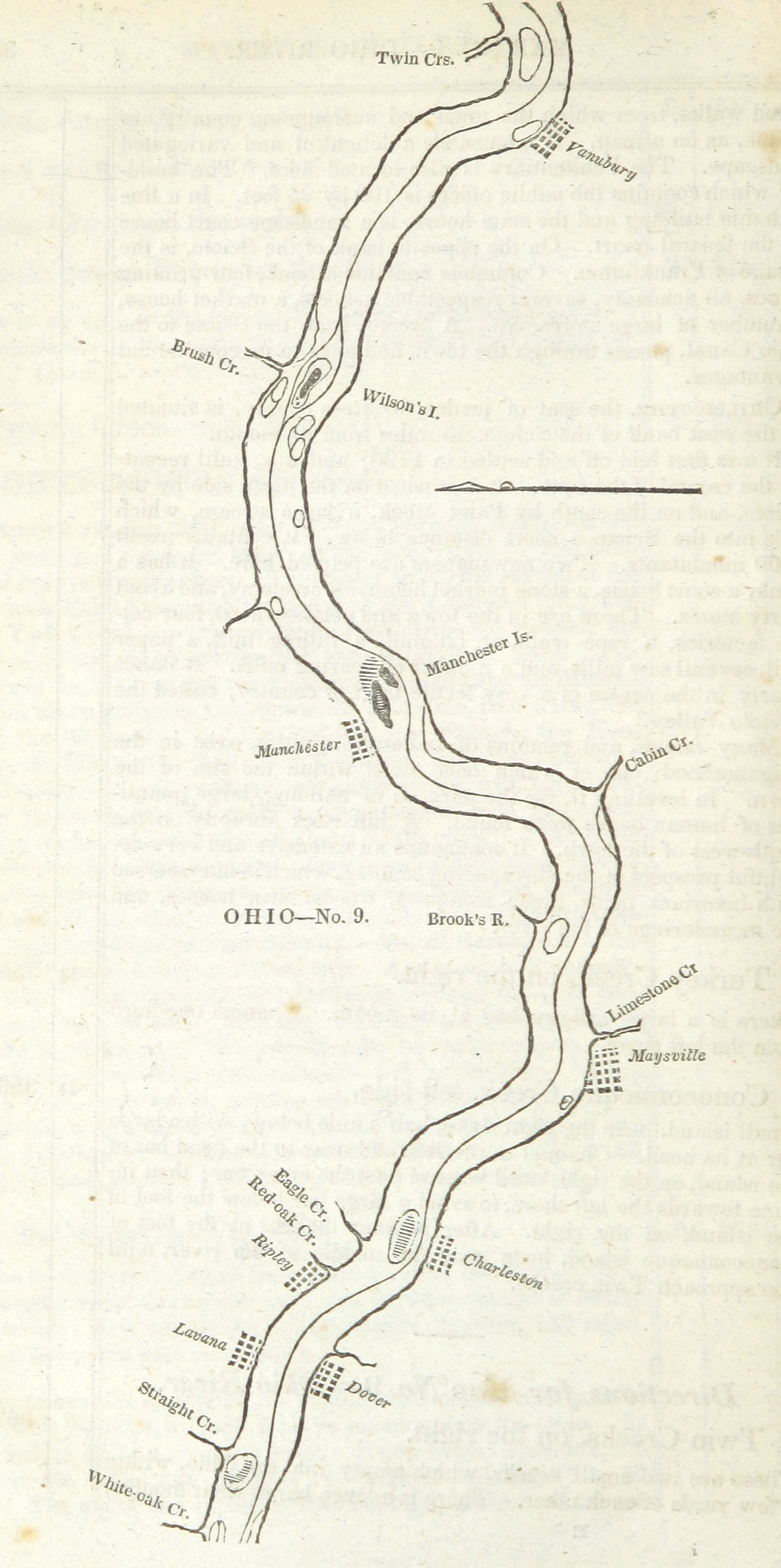
Ohio River landings in Kentucky near Maysville, The Western Pilot (1832)

In 1825, he was listed as a witness in a court case in Natchez, Mississippi, involving a Kentucky slave trader named Edward Stone and a male slave who had gotten into a fight. The following year, Stone and his nephew Howard Stone and three other men would be killed on the Ohio River by slaves they were transporting south to the Cotton Kingdom. In 1828, he was accused of having wrongfully resold a pair of young enslaved sisters, Malala, 13, and Marinda, 11, but Anderson denied the charges.

In 1833, Anderson was seemingly involved in the establishment of the Forks of the Road slave market outside Natchez. Cholera was epidemic that year, and a shipment from Alexandria, Virginia, to the Delta region arrived with a number of sick and dying enslaved passengers. Trader Isaac Franklin and his overseer apparently conspired to dump several of the bodies of the dead in a ravine near Natchez, and refused to participate in an investigation of the circumstances by which the barely buried bodies came to be in the ravine. The population of the town was irate at the dead babies and teenagers, and alarmed at the possibility that slave traders were importing contagion. To placate the citizens of Natchez, 10 slave traders, including John W. Anderson, Paul Pascal, and Thomas McCargo, signed a public letter agreeing to relocate outside the city limits. For the year 1833, he paid $113.75 in taxes for slave sales made in Natchez.

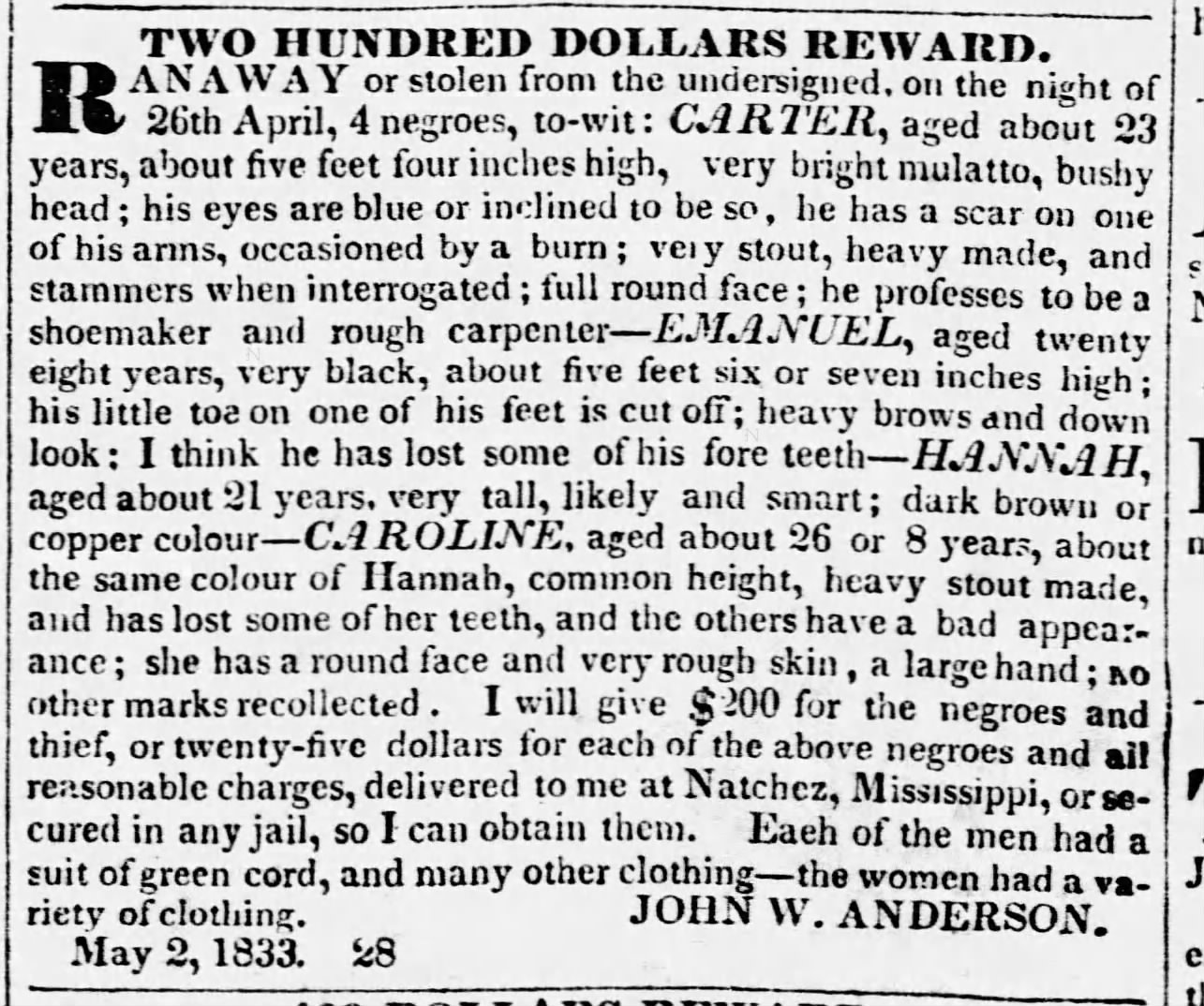
"Two Hundred Dollars Reward" Mississippi Free Trader, July 5, 1833

In the summer of 1833, John W. Anderson advertised heavily for the recovery of four slaves who had escaped him. Carter, Emanuel, Hannah, and Caroline were all in their 20s, and Carter and Emanuel wore suits made of green cord. In February 1834, a man named John Adams who lived near Vicksburg, Mississippi, placed a runaway slave ad seeking the return of "a Negro Man named ANTHONY, about 25 years of age, he was purchased from Mr. Anderson, a negro trader, last spring: said negro was brought from Kentucky."

In 1836, J. W. Anderson was nominated and elected as a Whig to represent Mason County in the Kentucky General Assembly. Anderson died a month after the election and never served in the legislature.

== Slave jail ==
The slave jail that stood on Anderson's land is believed to be perhaps the only surviving rural slave jail in existence. It was sheltered inside a tobacco barn built around it at a later date, and thus had some protection from the elements. When the landowners heard about the establishment of the National Underground Railroad Freedom Center in Cincinnati, they reached out and let them know about what they had been told was a "jail cell" when they bought the property. The family donated the building to the museum in exchange for a new barn. Archeological work in the vicinity found 6,000 related objects. When the building was being dismantled for transport, one of the logs was found to be stamped J. W. Anderson.

== See also ==
- List of slave traders of the United States
- History of slavery in Kentucky
- Slave markets and slave jails in the United States
- Bibliography of the slave trade in the United States
