= Michael Lüders =

German political scientist, Islamic scholar and author

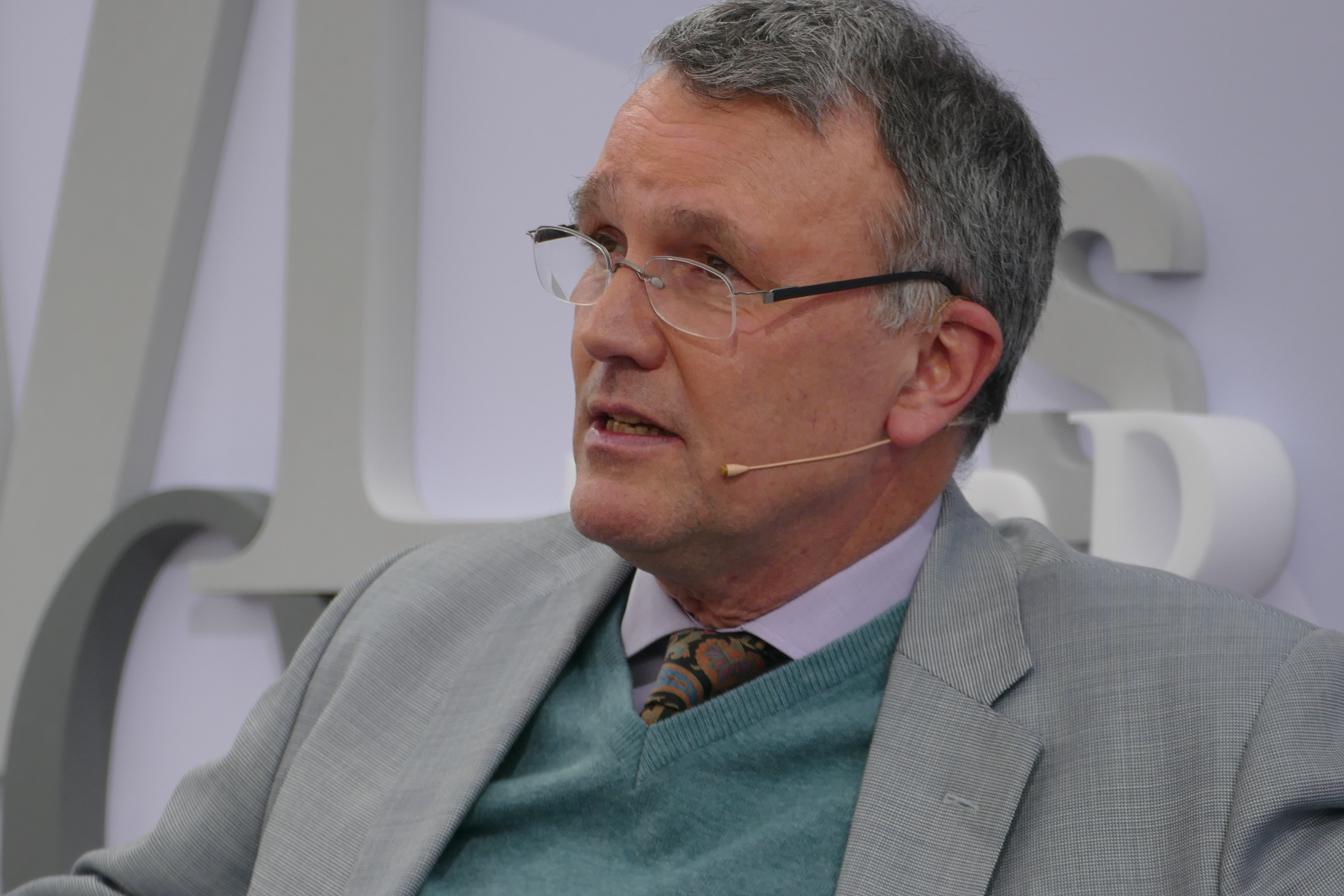
- Lüders in 2014

President of the German-Arab Association
- In office 15 September 2015 – 1 January 2022
- Preceded by: Peter Scholl-Latour
- Succeeded by: Vittoria Alliata di Villafranca

Personal details
- Born: Michael Andreas Lüders; 8 May 1959 (age 67) Bremen, West Germany
- Party: BSW (since 2024)
- Other political affiliations: SPD (2002–2003)
- Education: Damascus University; Free University of Berlin (PhD)
- Occupation: Political scientist • Politician

Michael Andreas Lüders (born 8 May 1959) is a German political scientist and academic of Islamic studies who works as a publicist and political and economic consultant. He is also known as a journalist and a writer of novels.

From 2015 to 2022, Lüders was president of the German-Arab Association. He was also an advisory board member of the Near and Middle East Association (NuMOV) and deputy chairman of the German Orient Foundation. He has been a member of the extended party executive of the Sahra Wagenknecht Alliance (BSW) since January 2024.

Lüders was a candidate in the 2024 European elections and the 2025 German federal election.

== Life ==
Michael Lüders studied Arabic literature for two semesters at the University of Damascus and journalism, Islamic studies and political science at the Free University of Berlin. He received his doctorate in philosophy with a thesis on Egyptian cinema.

Lüders then worked as a documentary filmmaker and radio play author for SWR and WDR and was Middle East editor at ZEIT from 1993 to 2002. From 2002 to 2003 he worked as a consultant for the Friedrich Ebert Foundation (FES), which is politically close to the Social Democratic Party of Germany (SPD).

Since January 2004, Lüders has been a freelance political and economic consultant, publicist and author as co-owner of the Middle East Consulting Group in Berlin. He says he gives lectures on "the tension between the West and the Arab-Islamic world" and "investment opportunities in the Arab world" and publishes "expert reports on the causes of Islamist violence". He advises the Federal Foreign Office (AA), among others, and prepares expert reports for the German Society for Technical Cooperation (giz) and the Federal Ministry for Economic Cooperation and Development (BMZ). In addition, he taught at the Center for Near and Middle Eastern Studies at Philipps University in Marburg in 2008/09 and was a guest lecturer at the Middle East Centre at Sakarya University in Turkey in 2015/16. In 2017, the University of Trier appointed him as a visiting professor for a total of three individual lectures. Protests against this included those by, among others, the German Foreign Office (AA), the local AStA and the Trier German-Israeli Society.

Lüders lives in Berlin.

== Party political engagement ==
Lüders has been a member of the Bündnis Sahra Wagenknecht (BSW) party since January 2024. At the first party conference of the BSW, he was elected to the extended party executive with 97.6%. In addition, he was placed 9th on the BSW party list for the 2024 European elections by the voting members. Lüders belongs to the Saxony-Anhalt regional association of the BSW, for which he is running as the top candidate for the 2025 German federal election.

== Positions ==
Lüders blames the United States for the escalation of conflicts in the Middle East: "... a policy of military intervention, such as that which the USA has implemented since 2001, since the terrorist attacks of September 11, whether in Afghanistan, Iraq, Syria, Libya or Yemen, [has] only brought about state collapse in all the countries mentioned ..., led to anarchy and chaos ... And the rise of terrorist movements such as the Islamic State can be traced back to this policy of intervention".

To resolve the Syrian Civil War and reduce the number of refugees, Lüders called for cooperation with Bashar al-Assad, Russia and Iran. He told the Berliner Zeitung: "There is already a protection zone for refugees in Syria. In the coastal strip on the Mediterranean that Assad's army still controls, there are four million people who have fled from ISIS."

In an interview about his book He who sows the wind..., Lüders explained his thesis that "Western politics" only "supposedly" stands for democracy and justice.

Lüders does not rule out a Kurdish background to the January 2016 Istanbul bombing. Turkish government agencies assumed that ISIS was responsible.

Regarding the airstrike on the 2017 Shayrat missile strike, which the US government carried out in response to the chemical attack, Lüders said that the US was opening Pandora's box. In Syria, there is a danger of a serious confrontation between the two nuclear powers, the US and Russia, in the near future. When Lüders put forward this thesis shortly afterwards on Anne Will's talk show, historian Michael Wolffsohn contradicted him and stated that the Russian side had been warned by the US, but had not shot down the US cruise missiles, although it could have done so.

In connection with the war in Afghanistan, he criticized a lack of willingness in Western politics to subject itself to critical self-examination regarding the role of the West in Afghanistan; the Russian invasion of Ukraine had instead directed attention in a different direction. The US government had "ensured behind the scenes that all pending proceedings against the USA for alleged war crimes in Afghanistan before the International Criminal Court in The Hague were discontinued".

== Publications and reception ==
=== We hunger for death (2001) ===
The journalist Alexandra Senfft described Lüders' second non-fiction book in the Süddeutsche Zeitung as a mixture of "analysis, basic information and personal experience". In the book the author accuses the American political scientist Samuel P. Huntington, with his theory of the clash of civilizations, of being close to the Taliban. Lüders outlines the Western view of the Arab–Israeli conflict as "on the one hand the peace-loving Israel, on the other the Palestinian terror" and points out that this is not shared by a third of the world's population. Lüders makes no secret of his criticism of the Middle East policy of the US and Europe, so that she wonders whether this is why Die Zeit parted ways with him as Middle East editor.

=== Tea in Timur's Garden (2003) ===
Senfft, this time for the Frankfurter Rundschau, described Lüders' next book as a "political travel guide", which offers the advantage of quick orientation, but has the disadvantage that the individual chapters of such a book are inevitably stronger or weaker, depending on the author's specialization. Central Asia seems to be less familiar to Lüders linguistically and culturally. He shows the interlinking of the conditions in the region with the geostrategic interests of the US and puts forward the thesis that without a solution to the Arab–Israeli conflict, the rest of the region cannot be pacified. She found it regrettable that Lüders did not rely on his own sources, but on second-hand information. The reviewer found the analyses of the complicated social structures in Iraq and Afghanistan all the more gripping.

The German investigative journalist Lutz Kleveman attested to Lüders' "political tour de force" through the Near and Middle East in terms of the part about the post-Soviet republics of Central Asia, a "cool, calm style", but criticised the lack of "more vivid descriptions and reports of experiences that convey analytical content from such unknown countries much more impressively". He considered the parts about Iraq and Afghanistan, which is based "on profound knowledge of the region", to be the strongest.

=== In the Heart of Arabia (2004) ===
For Hartmut Wagner (Eurasian Magazine), Lüders tried not to demonise the role of the US in the Middle East in his "pleasantly readable book". He believes Lüders gives the reader a colourful insight into everyday Arab life beyond the big world politics. The particularly personal book wins sympathy "particularly through the author's honesty". Lüders sees his long-term involvement with the foreign world of Arabia, which began as a child with the adventures of Kara Ben Nemsi from the Oriental novels of Karl May, as a process of self-exploration that is always accompanied by deep self-doubt. As a "combative analyst", he also represents less popular viewpoints: Lüders sees the causes of Islamism in the "unconditional support of the West for Israel" and holds its "policy, which violates international law and is geared towards hegemony" responsible for the rise of militant groups like Hamas and Hezbollah.

However Edith Kresta pointed out in Die Tageszeitung that for Lüders, even without Israel, "the misery of the Arab world, its stagnation and lack of creativity, its repression and violence would be the same". Lüders' book, according to the reviewer, is a "knowledgeable description of a politically and socially desolate world" that distracts from "its own inability" by blaming Israel. Only Lüders' blanket judgment "We are rich in material values, but poor in humanity. In the Orient it is exactly the other way around" does not fit with the otherwise differentiated portrayal.

=== Aminas Restaurant (2006) ===
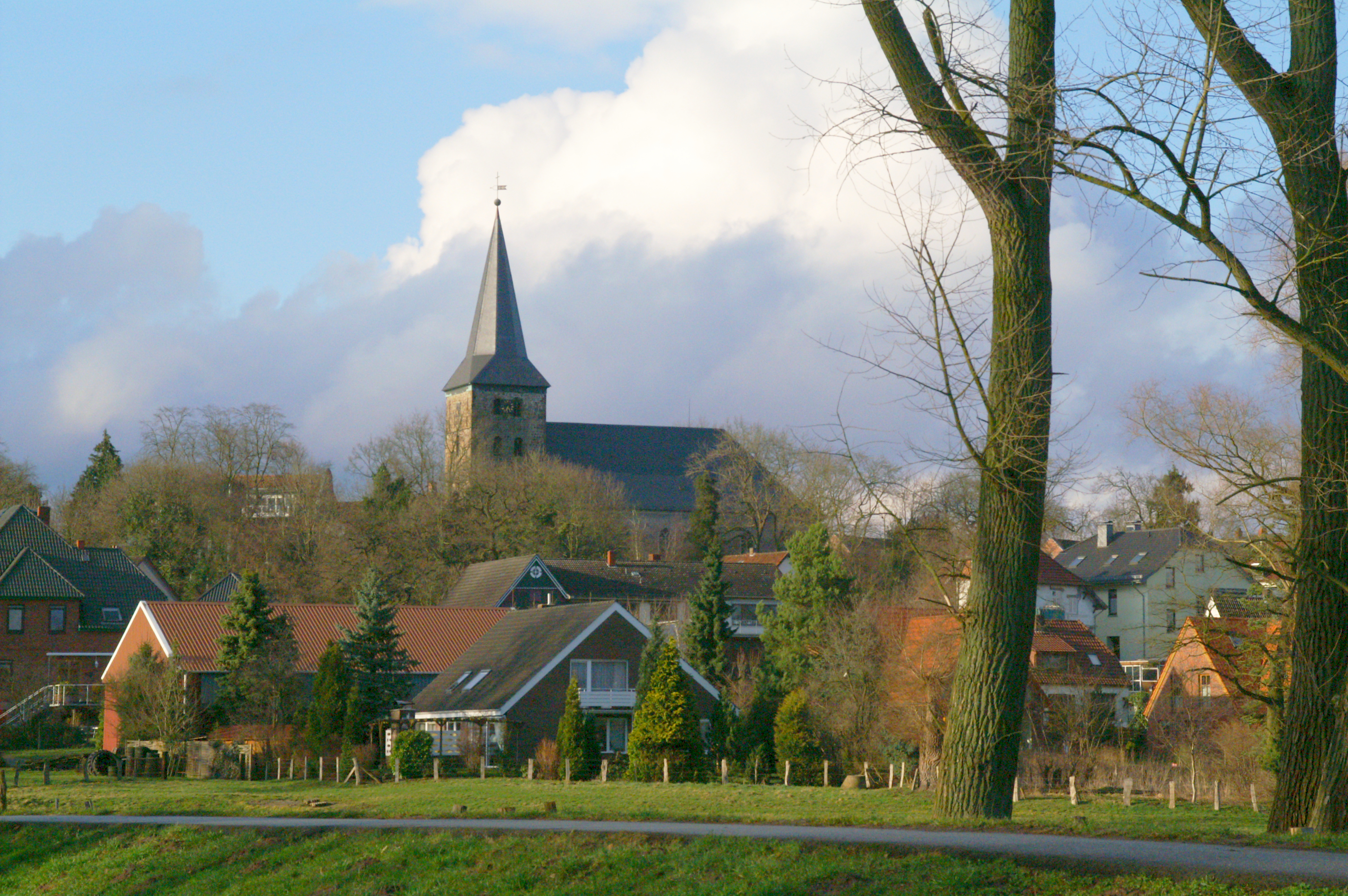
The novel begins at a weekly market not far from St. Martini Church in the Bremen district of Lesum.

Lüders' third novel Aminas Restaurant tells the story of a family that immigrated to Bremen from Morocco and opened a restaurant in the Hanseatic city. Lüders processed his new experiences from the Orient by transferring them to his hometown of Bremen and linking the two together. The novel received mostly positive reviews from national and international reviewers.

=== Days of Wrath (2011) ===
Lüders' book on the "Arab Spring" was shortlisted for "the best science book of 2011" in Austria. In the Neue Zürcher Zeitung, Beat Staufer praised the author for doing an excellent job of explaining everything necessary to understand the political and social conditions that prevailed in the individual countries before the uprisings broke out, in just a few pages. He was too critical of critics of Islam and saw the greatest potential for democracy with a ripple effect in Tunisia and Egypt. He was pessimistic about Libya and Iraq.

=== Iran: The Wrong War (2012) ===
The work was on the SZ / NDR best-seller list "Non-Fiction Books of the Month June 2012".

The journalist Franziska Augstein reviewed the book in the Süddeutsche Zeitung that Lüders describes in his excellent book why the attitude of carrying out a preventive military strike against Iran without international legal legitimacy is deluded. He makes it plausible why the Iranian government at the time, despite its irresponsible rhetoric, was trying to reach a compromise. Lüders explains that US policy is not particularly interested in reaching an understanding with Iran. Lüders supports the horror scenario of a regime change by force of arms and the chaos that follows, as in Iraq in 2003, with a clever, careful description.

Sociologist Wahied Wahdat-Hagh, on the other hand, found the book suggested that Lüders was an "Ahmadinejad sympathizer" with clear enemy images ("Israeli government, the Israel lobby or Washington's neo-conservatives") He wrote, "Lüders attested that the then Iranian president's denial of the Holocaust only served to convey his own inflexibility to his domestic clientele". According to Lüders, the Iranian government does not dispute Israel's right to exist either, although it has been talking about "Greater Palestine" for decades and has called for the end and destruction of Israel in various ways. Lüders trivializes the violence and terror against Israel and therefore describes it as "quite logical" that the Iranian government supports Hamas and Hezbollah. Lüders sees the blame for the Middle East conflict fundamentally with Israel, his prejudices are deeply rooted and he is not prepared to recognize the causes of a potential war.

The journalist Gemma Pörzgen on Deutschlandfunk criticized the only "apparent inevitability of the development described by [Lüders]", but praised his "expertise" and saw in the "absolutely worth reading" book a "pleasant effort at objectivity".

Historian of the anti-German current Matthias Küntzel described Lüders' portrayal of Iran as a one-sided "fairy tale book" that takes the Iranian side and does not stand up to scrutiny of the sources. Küntzel wrote that he "wrongly relie"s on the Guldimann Memorandum and "invents events that do not exist and suspects an Israeli conspiracy behind US policy in a well-known intellectual tradition". Küntzel also accuses Lüders of the fact that his alleged economic interests in the region in connection with his work as a "Middle East economic lobbyist" are not mentioned either by his publisher or in his regular appearances on public broadcasting.

The political scientist Stephan Grigat reviewed the book in the Jungle World as a "perfidious" trivialization of Khomeinism, which one-sidedly conceals and misrepresents facts, ignores the standard literature in the sense of his presentation and instead relies on anti-Zionist authors such as Ilan Pappe. Lüders does not analyse the hatred of Israel as one of the central elements of Khomeinist ideology, but trivializes it to "instrumental demonization" and ignores all of Israel's efforts to find a peaceful solution. Grigat wrote that his claims that the pro-Israel American Israel Public Affairs Committee (AIPAC) "advocates a Greater Israel", stands for the "fundamental rejection of a Palestinian state" or that the early days of Israel were characterized by revisionism are untrue.

Sylke Tempel from Internationale Politik found that his portrayal of the topic was based on "a lot of imagination and little serious research", not only sloppily researched, but pure propaganda. "This is how Lüders' principle works. Everything is twisted so that it fits into his world view of evil Israeli and American warmongers and poor, purely defensive Iran". Tempel said it was incomprehensible how Lüders could acquire the reputation of an expert, for example, given his choice of literature.

=== He who sows the wind (2015) ===
In April 2017, this book by Lüders had been on the bestseller list of Buchreport for over 100 weeks.

On the political science front, Christian Patz criticized the book for having a "cynical undertone" that sometimes escalated into the "absurd": Lüders went so far as to say that the American cruise missile attack on Al-Qaeda training camps was a reaction to the bombings of the US embassies in Kenya and Tanzania in 1998 to distract from the Lewinsky affair. "Beyond the detailed indictment" of Western politics, Lüders neglected the dynamics of the causes and the responsibility of the regimes in the region for their state.

The ARD cultural magazine ttt – titel, thesen, temperamente, however, praised the book as being knowledgeable, pointed and grippingly written. In her review, Christine Romann particularly points out the recurring political patterns that Lüders seeks to uncover in the past. The disaster of fanatical Islam, the Islamic revolution in Iran, the terror, the brutal violence of ISIS would not have existed in the world without the interventions of the West over the last 60 years. Behind all of this, according to Lüders, there have always been business interests, geopolitics and power politics, especially of the USA.

In the Islamische Zeitung, Andreas Abu Bakr Rieger judged that Lüders, as an "incorruptible chronicler", cleverly summarizes the decades-long machinations of the West in the region, but he notes that Lüders, while sharply criticizing Israel's policies with good reason, somewhat misses the depths of the suicidal strategy of the Hamas ideologues.

Armin Pfahl-Traughber at the Humanist Press Service acknowledged that the book contained "a wealth of historical and political facts that illustrate the ambivalence and double standards of Western politics in the region", but Lüders asked important questions such as: "Is there a single military intervention by the West that has not resulted in chaos, dictatorship, and new violence?" Pfahl-Traughber, however, criticized the "excitement and one-sidedness, but also moralism and superficiality" of the presentation. Lüders did not explain in detail why the USA or the West acted in this way, and the good-evil pattern of judging the actors can also be found in his own work.

=== Never Say Anything (2016) ===
The novel, whose title alludes to the National Security Agency (NSA) (Never Say Anything), is about the experiences of a journalist who survives a military attack in Morocco and, during her research, comes across the traces of American elite soldiers. Through her research, she increasingly finds herself in danger.

According to Radio Bremen, this novel combines specialist knowledge and narrative art to create an "explosive, highly exciting political thriller". Annemarie Stoltenberg from NDR found that the novel's fiction seems so real "that its readers are left breathless". Berit Niebel wrote in the Recklinghäuser Zeitung: "This thriller is disturbing and it really confuses our perception of the 'friends' across the Atlantic".

=== Those Who Reap the Storm (2017) ===
This book was on the bestseller list of Der Spiegel for several weeks in 2017, and it reached number 1 in issue 14 of 2017 (paperback non-fiction) of Buchreport.

Winfried Dolderer reviewed the book for Deutschlandfunk: Lüders' "contribution to the debate" is interesting and worth reading, but also controversial. The reader will agree with much of the analysis, which is based on leaked US embassy cables and Hillary Clinton's memos, but "that it was the West alone that plunged Syria into chaos, as formulated in the subtitle, remains an assertion." Lüders' historical overview, which uses a broad source base to present the history of Western attacks on Syria's political order, which began in March 1949 with a military coup organized by the Central Intelligence Agency (CIA) against the elected president Shukri al-Kuwatli, is particularly highlighted.

For the Bavarian Broadcasting Corporation's cultural journal, Lüders is "not trying to trivialize the conduct of the war by Assad or his Russian allies"; on the contrary, in the West, Assad's large "part in the internationalization and thus the escalation of the conflict is not a prominent theme in the media and political description of the war." In Iraq, however, "it has already been shown that a regime change supported from outside has led to the collapse of the state and thus to the strengthening of radical jihadism." The misguided policy of intervention in the name of one's own geostrategic interests can no longer tame the spirits it has summoned. Michael Lüders explains the background to this fateful connection in his book.

The team of the Tagesschau anti-fake news programme "faktenfinder" under the direction of Patrick Gensing researched the thesis propagated by Lüders in his book that, contrary to what the West claims, Turkey supplied poison gas to radical Islamic rebels in Syria in 2013 and that they were responsible for the chemical attacks in Ghouta. Lüders bases his false flag accusation on articles by the journalist Seymour Hersh. However, Hersh's theories have been strongly doubted by his detractors. In 2014, Eliot Higgins in the Guardian had already explicitly contradicted Hersh, pointing out the types of ammunition used and ruled out Turkish involvement. The "faktenfinder" team came to the conclusion that the serious allegations made by Lüders are based on very thin and contradictory sources and are based on the key question "Cui bono?". Evidence that does not fit Lüders' version (here, for example, reports from Human Rights Watch and the UN Human Rights Council, which indicated that Syrian government troops were responsible for the gas attacks) mostly remained unmentioned. Although Lüders received much applause for his claims, they do not appear particularly substantial upon closer examination. Furthermore, according to Daniel Steinvorth's assessment in the NZZ of September 2019, Lüders completely fixated on the US as the perpetrator, ignoring the then hesitant foreign policy of US President Barack Obama.

=== Armageddon in the Orient (2018) ===
In his work Armageddon in the Orient, Lüders covers the Iran–Saudi Arabia proxy conflict and warns of the incalculable consequences of a war between Saudi Arabia and Iran and of the black-and-white view of Iran as a rogue state, which he sees as common. "Especially in times of fake news ," he says, it is necessary to refute the "enemy image prose." He sees his goal as making the real factors of politics clear: maintaining power and asserting interests.

Lüder's book is a detailed analysis of the conflict between these two states. In a historical outline, he looks at the different developments in the two countries. He shows how, on the one hand, in the 18th century, the radical Sunni Wahhabism on the Arabian Peninsula developed from a "political-religious sect" to become Saudi Arabia's state religion, which from then on demonized other Islamic movements, but above all the Shia religion of the Iranians. Oil exploration changed Saudi Arabia for good. Among other things, the royal family entered into many ties with the USA. The relationships between the "Houses of Bush and Saud, the interplay of American and Saudi capital: a unique conglomerate of politics and big business" are well known.

On the other hand, Lüders reminds us that the Western powers installed the Persian Shah Mohammed Reza Pahlevi in Iran in 1941, and that it was the USA that laid the foundations for the Iranian nuclear program in 1957 as part of the " Atoms for Peace" program initiated under US President Eisenhower. However, since the authoritarian-dictatorial regime of the Shah of Persia was unpopular with the Iranian people, "religion, Islam, became the melting pot of the dissatisfied." In 1979, the Islamic Revolution, led by Ruhollah Khomeini, overthrew the last Iranian Shah. Lüders sees Shiite Iran as "the only remaining regional power in the Near and Middle East that openly opposes Western and Israeli claims to hegemony."

Lüders believes that the contrast between Iran and Saudi Arabia "cannot be explained rationally alone". He states that the two countries are on different levels of civilization. "Above all, the Saudis, the Gulf Arabs as a whole, lived in the Middle Ages until two generations ago. Their self-esteem is correspondingly low compared to Iran, which is rich in history [...]. To put it provocatively: the Iranians play chess, the Saudis play Monopoly."

In his review in the Süddeutsche Zeitung, René Wildangel admits that Lüders correctly assesses the explosiveness of the conflict and the power-political factors. However, he accuses the author of falling into the same black-and-white painting that he constantly criticizes. In his portrayal of the war in Syria, he ultimately follows the "Syrian-Russian narrative." Lüders does not really succeed in providing alternatives to the mainstream media reports that he criticizes, since his work is based only on newspaper articles and not on his own research. Lüders also provides a lot of correct and enlightening information on the Iranian-Saudi conflict, but little that is new. The military and strategic aspect and the development of concrete political alternatives are missing..

== Social media and television appearances ==
In Markus Lanz's ZDF talk show on 5 April 2017, one day after the chemical attack in Khan Shaykhun, Lüders claimed, citing Can Dündar, that Turkey had supplied chemical gas to the Syrian rebels in 2013. According to the FAS, Dündar contradicted Lüders's statement shortly afterwards, calling it "total nonsense" and stating that Cumhuriyet, whose editor-in-chief he was at the time, had only reported on Turkish arms deliveries to the rebels. Dündar later corrected his statement and claimed that the Cumhuriyet did indeed publish such reports, but that they did not come from his pen. The West, however, blamed the Syrian government for the 2017 attack, while Russia and the government claimed that a chemical gas depot belonging to the Syrian opposition had been hit. In September 2017, a special United Nations commission concluded that the Syrian government was responsible for the attack. This presentation was commented on by Stefan Winterbauer on 24 April 2017, saying that "some of the information about Lüders and his positions was clearly misrepresented or even distorted. As is so often the case, there is probably no concerted campaign behind it, but rather an unpleasant mixture of misunderstandings and herd instinct. The results of such collective sloppiness, viewed from the outside, are not dissimilar to those of a campaign"

Brigitte Baetz explained on Deutschlandradio on the occasion of Lüders’ appearance on Anne Will on 10 April 2017, that he is celebrated in social media in particular by those who reject the so-called "systemmedien" and believe that the West has conspired against Putin and Assad. Lüders, on the other hand, is viewed critically by Middle East experts, among others. Baetz was referring to Sylke Tempel, editor-in-chief of the magazine Internationale Politik, who had already accused Lüders in 2012 of cultivating the worldview of "evil Israeli and American warmongers," and Thorsten Gerald Schneiders, editor at Deutschlandfunk and Islamic scholar, who compared Lüders to the "UFO expert Erich von Däniken." Anne Will had said in her talk show that Lüders was "deliberately not introduced as a neutral Middle East expert, but as an author and as a political and economic advisor" and a "businessman who sells his knowledge to companies that want to do business in the Near and Middle East". Her question to him as to whether his "economic interests played a role when [he claimed] that it was the West that had plunged Syria into chaos" remained unanswered. He replied that he would "quite like to analyse on a factual level". Baetz criticised Will's introduction for not also pointing out her paid advisory functions to other guests on the same panel. Lüders later said that he felt deliberately discredited and doubted that Will even wanted to have a factual dialogue.

== Awards ==
- 2004: Muhammad-Nafi-Tschelebi-Preis

== Publications ==
In addition to non-fiction, Lüders has written radio plays and produced documentaries about Afghanistan and Egypt. His novels and short stories are set in the Near or Middle East.

=== Non-fiction books / non-fiction novels and stories ===
- Das Lächeln des Propheten. Eine arabische Reise. EVA, Hamburg 1996, ISBN 978-3-442-31776-9.
- Wir hungern nach dem Tod. Woher kommt die Gewalt im Dschihad-Islam? Arche, Zürich 2001, ISBN 3-7160-2300-0
- Tee im Garten Timurs. Die Krisengebiete nach dem Irak-Krieg. Arche, Zürich 2003, ISBN 3-7160-2321-3
- Im Herzen Arabiens. Stolz und Leidenschaft – Begegnung mit einer zerrissenen Kultur. Herder, Freiburg im Breisgau 2006, ISBN 3-451-28347-6
- Allahs langer Schatten. Warum wir keine Angst vor dem Islam haben müssen. Herder, Freiburg im Breisgau 2007, ISBN 3-451-29664-0
- Tage des Zorns. Die arabische Revolution verändert die Welt. C. H. Beck, München 2011, ISBN 978-3-406-62290-8 (Rezension in Sehepunkte)
- Iran. Der falsche Krieg. Wie der Westen seine Zukunft verspielt. C. H. Beck, München 2012, ISBN 978-3-406-64026-1
- Wer den Wind sät. Was westliche Politik im Orient anrichtet. C. H. Beck, München 2015, ISBN 978-3-406-67749-6
- Die den Sturm ernten: Wie der Westen Syrien ins Chaos stürzte. C. H. Beck, München 2017, ISBN 978-3-406-70780-3
- Armageddon im Orient. Wie die Saudi-Connection den Iran ins Visier nimmt. C. H. Beck, München 2018, ISBN 978-3-406-72791-7
- Die scheinheilige Supermacht. Warum wir aus dem Schatten der USA heraustreten müssen. C.H. Beck, München 2021, ISBN 978-3-406-76839-2
- Hybris am Hindukusch. Wie der Westen in Afghanistan scheiterte. C.H.Beck, München 2022, ISBN 978-3-406-78490-3
- Moral über alles? Warum sich Werte und nationale Interessen selten vertragen. Goldmann, München 2023, ISBN 978-3-442-31731-8
- Krieg ohne Ende? Warum wir für Frieden im Nahen Osten unsere Haltung zu Israel ändern müssen. Goldmann, München 2024, ISBN 978-3-442-31776-9
- Drecksarbeit? Israel, Amerika und der imperiale Größenwahn im Nahen Osten. Goldmann, München 2025, ISBN 978-3-442-30250-5

=== Romance ===
- Aminas Restaurant. Ein modernes Märchen. Arche, Zürich 2006, ISBN 3-7160-2351-5.
- Blöder Hund. Knaur, München 2010, ISBN 978-3-426-50657-8 (humoristischer Roman)

=== Sophie Schelling series ===
The protagonist of this thriller series is the German journalist Sophie Schelling and the Norwegian secret service unit E 39.

- Never Say Anything. C. H. Beck, München, 2016, ISBN 978-3-406-68892-8.
- Die Spur der Schakale. C.H. Beck, München 2020, ISBN 978-3-406-74857-8.
- Strahlendes Eis. C.H. Beck, München 2024, ISBN 978-3-406-81385-6.

== Literature ==
- Internationales Biographisches Archiv 23/2009 vom 2. Juni 2009 (rw) Ergänzt um Nachrichten durch MA-Journal bis KW 18/2012 im Munzinger-Archiv (Artikelanfang frei abrufbar)

== Radio reports ==
- Wer den Wind sät – Was westliche Politik im Orient anrichtet, SWR Tele-Akademie vom 12. April 2015 (YouTube)
- Terror in Nizza – schon wieder Frankreich, Deutsche Welle vom 17. Juli 2016 (YouTube)
