= Stephan Bierling =

German political scientist

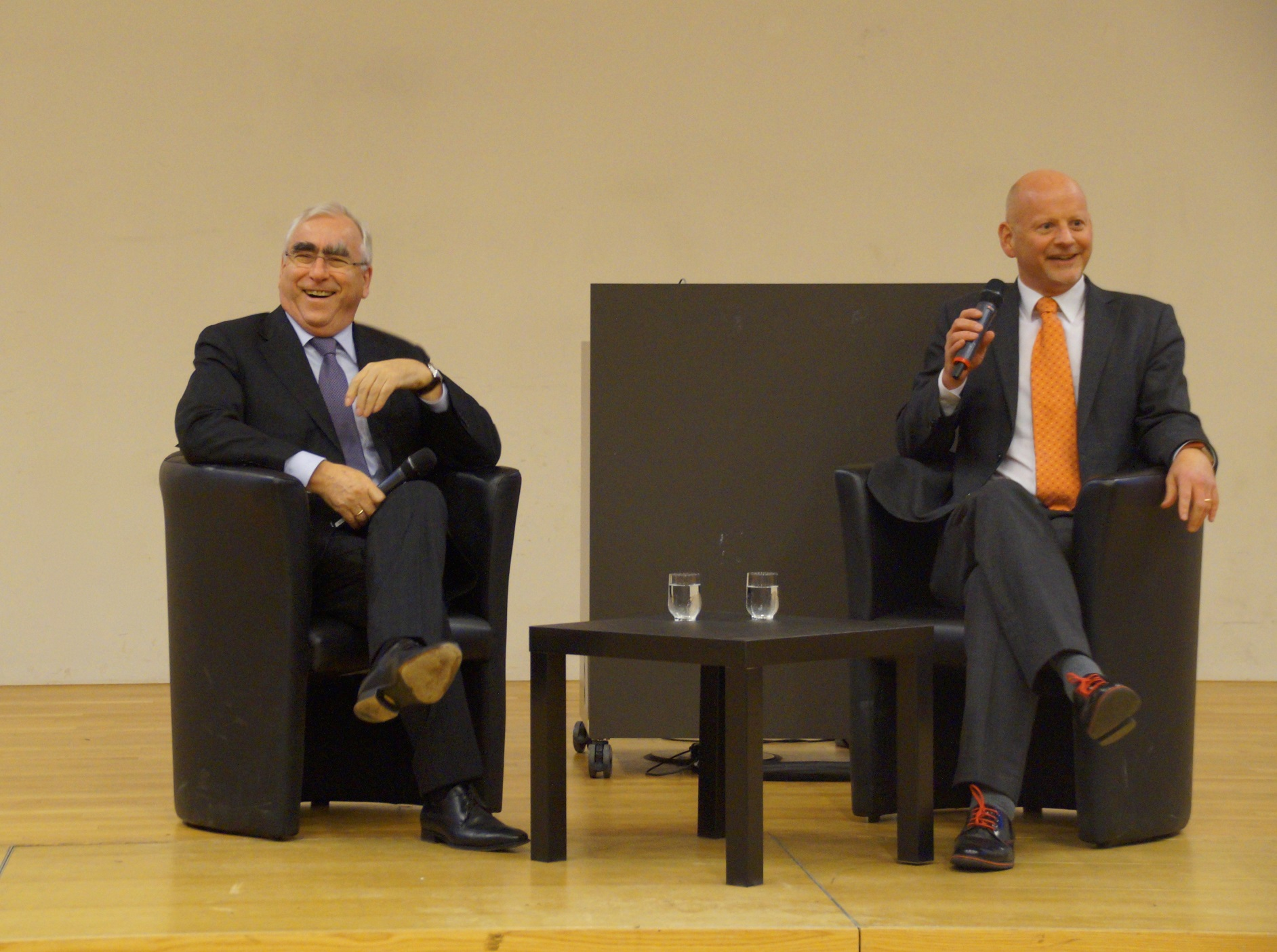
Prof. Bierling (right) in conversation with Fr. Federal Minister of Finance (1989-98), Theo Waigel (Regensburg, 13.12.2016)

Stephan Bierling (born 1962) is a German political scientist. He teaches at the University of Regensburg, where he holds the only international relations-professorship in the country dedicated to transatlantic relations.

== Life and career ==
He received his M.A. (with distinction), his Ph.D. (summa cum laude) and his postdoctoral degree (Habilitation) from LMU Munich. Before taking the position of full professor at the University of Regensburg in 2000, he taught at the University of Erlangen–Nuremberg and LMU Munich. Bierling was a visiting professor at Austin College (Sherman/TX, 1993), the University of Fort Hare (Alice/South Africa, 1998), the Hebrew University of Jerusalem (Jerusalem, 1999), the University of California, San Diego (2003), and the University of Newcastle (Australia, 2014). In 2001, Bierling was the German Marshall Fund fellow at the Pacific Council on International Policy at USC in Los Angeles. In 2009 and 2010, he participated in the Bergedorf Circle of former Federal President Richard von Weizsäcker, in 2010, he was an observer, in 2015 a TV commentator at the Munich Security Conference. In 2016, Bierling wrote an expert witness analysis on Australia’s reactions to the Snowden disclosures for the NSA investigative committee of the Bundestag.

Bierling's main field of research and teaching is the domestic, economic and foreign policy of the US and Germany, transatlantic relations and the international system. He also writes on the global economy and South Africa and has published eleven books (The National Security Advisor of the US-President, 1990, 180 p; Partners or Opponents? The President and Congress in US-Foreign Policymaking, 1992, 300 p; Economic Aid for Moscow: Motives and Strategies of Germany and the US, 1998, 350 p; German Foreign Policy: Norms, Actors, Decisions, 1999 (2nd pr. 2005), 350 p; History of U.S. Foreign Policy since 1917, 2003 (3rd ed. 2007), 285 p; A Brief History of California, 2006, 245 p; The Piggyback Strategy. Europe's Foreign Policy Options, 2007, 110 p; A History of the Iraq War, 2010, 260 p; Nelson Mandela, 2012, 128 p (2nd ed. 2018); The Reluctant Hegemon: German Foreign Policy since Unification, 2014, 308 p; Nelson Mandela: Rebel, Prisoner, President, 2018, 416 p; four dozen academic articles and numerous pieces in national and international newspapers in German and English (e.g. Neue Zürcher Zeitung, FAZ, SZ, IHT, Die Welt, Die Zeit).

For 15 years, Bierling was a senior book reviewer for Germany's leading foreign policy journal, Internationale Politik. He is a frequent commentator for national and international radio and TV shows and gives a lot of public talks. From 1986 to 1989 Bierling was a stipendee of the Adenauer foundation and since 2009 is its mentor-in-residence at the University of Regensburg. In 1996, he received the Ludwig Erhard Award for outstanding economic analysis of experts under 35 years of age. In 2002, he won the Academic Teacher of the Year Award of the State of Bavaria, in 2008 and 2010 he was runner-up for the nationwide Professor of the Year Award of Unicum magazine in the field of humanities and social sciences, and in 2013 he won the award. Bierling held many elective administrative positions, e.g., dean of department (2007 to 2008) and Vice President of the University of Regensburg (2008 to 2010). Since 2017, he is a member of the board for the PhD program "Security and Development" of the Adenauer Foundation.

For 25 years, Bierling led all in all 500 German students to the annual summer school Summer Symposium on U.S. Foreign Policy in Washington, D.C, which brings together students from all over the world. Since 2005, students under his supervision have participated in the largest simulation conference in the world, the National Model United Nations in New York. He has raised more than €200,000 for these programs. Bierling edits a book series in which his IR graduates can publish their theses (30 vols. so far). He regularly invites politicians, journalists, diplomats, generals, and foreign policy experts for discussions with his students. In 2006, 2007 and 2009, Bierling did extensive lecture tours in China and in Chile. Bierling was born in 1962 in the Bavarian Alpine village of Oberammergau.
