= Deutsch-Arabische Gesellschaft =

German–Arab non-governmental association

German-Arab Association
- Deutsch-Arabische Gesellschaft
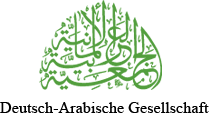
- Established: 1966
- Founded at: Würzburg
- Type: NGO
- Headquarters: Berlin
- President: Vittoria Alliata di Villafranca
- Website: https://www.d-a-g.de

The Deutsch-Arabische Gesellschaft (DAG; The German-Arab Association) is a non-governmental non-profit association founded in 1966 to strengthen German-Arabian relations in political, environmental, and cultural areas.

== Organisational structure ==
=== Executive committee ===
The association is governed by an executive committee headed by a president. Other members of the committee are at least two vice presidents, the treasurer and the secretary general. The dean of the advisory board and the honorary presidents (if any have been appointed) are invited to meetings of the executive committee to offer advice. The position of president is currently vacant. Notable former presidents include Peter Scholl-Latour and Jürgen Möllemann.

=== Advisory board ===
The executive committee is supported by an advisory board consisting of the dean of the advisory board (currently former German ambassador Bernd Erbel), the ambassadors of the Arabic nations to Germany and other members.

== People ==
- Peter Scholl-Latour
- Michael Lüders
- Vittoria Alliata di Villafranca
