= Ralph E. Oesper =

American chemistry historian (1886–1977)

Ralph Edward Oesper
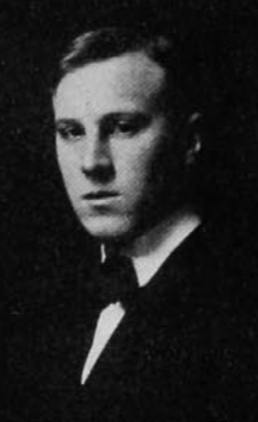
- Oesper in the 1908; University of Cincinnati yearbook
- Born: June 14, 1886; Cincinnati, Ohio U.S.
- Died: December 10, 1977 (aged 91); Cincinnati, Ohio
- Occupation: Science historian
- Spouse: Helen Wilson Oesper
- Children: Peter Oesper
- Awards: Dexter Award

Academic background
- Education: Ph.D.
- Alma mater: University of Cincinnati
- Thesis: Some New Hydroxyurethanes and Chromoisomeric Silver Salts of their Acyl Derivatives (1914)
- Doctoral advisor: Lauder William Jones

Academic work
- Discipline: History of Science; Analytical chemistry
- Institutions: University of Cincinnati
- Notable works: The Human Side of Scientists (book); New analytical reagents

Ralph Edward Oesper (14 June 1886 – 10 December 1977) was an American chemist and historian of chemistry. He is noted for his biographies of scientists, emphasizing their personal lives in addition to their scientific contributions. Oesper translated significant works in the field of chemistry to various languages especially English. As an independent investigator, he developed improved analytical methods. These contributions included new reagents for certain types of titrations. One such new reagent, Oesper's Salt, is named after him.

== Personal life and education ==
Oesper was born in Cincinnati and attended public schools before enrolling at the University of Cincinnati in 1904. There he earned a bachelor's degree in 1908, a master's degree in 1909, and a PhD in 1914 with Lauder William Jones as his thesis advisor. These degrees were all in the field of chemistry or analytical chemistry.

On 29 June 1910 he married Helen Gertrude Wilson (1885–1972). The couple had one child, Peter Oesper, who also became a chemistry professor.

== Career ==
Following completion of his PhD degree, Oesper taught for a brief time at New York University and then at Smith College as a non-tenure track faculty member. He then in 1918 became a tenure track faculty member and later a full professor at the University of Cincinnati, where he remained until his retirement in 1951 as professor emeritus. In retirement, he remained active as an occasional lecturer, a journal editor, and a translator of scientific books and articles.

Oesper wrote approximately 300 scientific articles on analytical and organic chemistry, colloid chemistry and chemical history. He was fluent in the German language and translated about 20 chemistry books and numerous articles from German into English. He also translated chemistry articles from French and Dutch into English.

=== Analytical chemistry ===
Early in his career as an independent researcher, Oesper continued investigations in analytical chemistry. His scientific accomplishments at this stage of his career included demonstrating the utility of the compound ferrous ethylene diamine sulfate in certain applications especially redox titrations. This compound replaced Mohr's salt (ferrous ammonium sulfate) in many applications because of its greater stability compared to Mohr's salt. He published these findings in 1947. Ferrous ethylene diamine sulfate is often referred to as "Oesper's Salt", in recognition of Oesper's scientific contributions.

A further contribution to analytical chemistry was his demonstration of the use of naphthidine as an indicator for certain chromate titrations such as for chloride ion. This improved indicator resulted in better testing results. He published this finding in 1934.

=== Biographies and translations ===
Following extensive European travel in the 1920s, Oesper began writing and compiling biographies of notable European chemists. These biographies were published in the United States in 1929 in a journal article entitled "What a Chemist May See in Europe". The publication included 24 biographies, examples including Fritz Haber, Alfred Nobel, Wilhelm Ostwald, Joseph Priestley, Jeremias Benjamin Richter amongst others.

As part of his career as a researcher in analytical chemistry, in 1938 Oesper translated a significant treatise on analytical methods from the German language into English, thereby making the information more broadly available. From then, Oesper continued to translated important scientific works.

Oesper wrote numerous short biographies of notable chemists and lectured on the history of chemistry. Particularly notable was his 1975 book The Human Side of Scientists, which emphasized the lives of the scientists over their scientific contributions per se. The book includes 138 short biographies of scientists, mostly chemists.

=== Honors and legacy ===
In 1954, Oesper received the 5th annual Eminent Chemist award by the American Chemical Society. In 1956 he received the first Dexter Award for Outstanding Achievement in the History of Chemistry from the American Chemical Society. In 1966 he was awarded an honorary doctorate by the University of Cincinnati.

Oesper was a member of the editorial boards of the Journal of Chemical Education, Chymia, Mikrochemie, and Microchimica Acta.

Oesper bequeathed his extensive library to the University of Cincinnati. This included a financial endowment to fund projects on the history of chemistry. The University of Cincinnati with the Cincinnati section of the American Chemical Society present an annual Oesper Award and Symposium series, named in Ralph Oesper's honor.

Oesper was also known for his efforts to preserve the history of chemistry. In addition to his work as a translator and historian, he helped establish one of the most comprehensive collections of historical chemical apparatus and literature in the United States, now housed at the University of Cincinnati.

== Selected publications ==
=== Articles ===
- Oesper, Ralph E.; Broker, Walter; Cook, Walter A. (1925). "New chlorocarbonates derived from aromatic and dihydroxy alcohols". Journal of the American Chemical Society. 47 (10): 2609–2610. doi:10.1021/ja01687a028.
- Cohen, Stuart; Oesper, Ralph E. "The Preparation of Naphthidine." Industrial & Engineering Chemistry Analytical Edition". 8 (4). 1936: 306–307. doi:10.1021/ac50102a036.
- Oesper, Ralph E.; Deasy, Clara L. (1 April 1939). "The Preparation of Lead Tetraacetate". J. Am. Chem. Soc. 61 (4): 972–973. doi:10.1021/ja01873a510.
- Oesper, R. E.; Fulmer, R. E. (1 June 1953). "New Analog of Cupferron". Anal. Chem. 25 (6): 908–909. doi:10.1021/ac60078a016.

=== Books ===
As translator:

- Feigl, Fritz (1943). Laboratory manual of spot tests. Academic Press.
- Feigl, Fritz (1946). Qualitative analysis by spot tests, inorganic and organic applications (3rd ed.). Elsevier.
- Laue, Max von (1950). History of physics. Academic Press.

As author:

- Oesper, Ralph E. The Human Side of Scientists, University Publications, 1975.
