= Microchimica Acta =

- Discipline: Chemistry
- Language: English
- Edited by: Alberto Escarpa, Mamas I. Prodromidis

Publication details
- Former name(s): Mikrochemie; Mikrochemie vereinigt mit Mikrochimica acta
- History: 1937–present
- Publisher: Springer Nature (Austria)
- Frequency: Monthly
- Open access: Hybrid
- Impact factor: 5.4 (2023)

Standard abbreviations
- ISO 4: Microchim. Acta

Indexing
- CODEN: MIACAQ
- ISSN: 0026-3672 (print); 1436-5073 (web)
- LCCN: 84645540
- OCLC no.: 664562640

Links
- Journal homepage; Online archive

Microchimica Acta is a monthly peer-reviewed scientific journal published by Springer Nature. It was established in 1937 by Fritz Pregl. The editors-in-chief are Alberto Escarpa (University of Alcalá) and Mamas I. Prodromidis (University of Ioannina), who succeeded Otto S. Wolfbeis (University of Regensburg). The journal covers research on (bio)chemical analytical methods based on the use of micro- and nanomaterials. According to the Journal Citation Reports, the journal has a 2023 impact factor of 5.3.
