= Harem (Alliata book) =

1980 book by Vittoria Alliata

- Author: Vittoria Alliata
- Language: Italian
- Publisher: Garzanti
- Publication date: 1980
- Publication place: Italy
- Pages: 253

Harem. Memorie d'Arabia di una nobildonna siciliana (lit. 'Harem: Memories from Arabia of a Sicilian Noblewoman') is a 1980 book by the Italian writer Vittoria Alliata. It is about women's lives in the Middle East, based on Alliata's interactions and surveys during more than a decade in the region.
