= Michael Dowling (scholar) =

Michael Dowling (born 1958, Port Jefferson, New York) is an American scholar, and Professor of Innovation and Technology Management at the University of Regensburg, in Germany.

== Background ==
Prof. Dr. Michael Dowling was named to the Professorship for Innovation and Technology Management at the University of Regensburg effective July 1, 1996. Previously he had been an Assistant Professor and Associate Professor with tenure at the University of Georgia, USA. Prof. Dowling was born in 1958 in New York, USA. He is the younger brother of physicist Jonathan Dowling. He graduated from Clear Lake High School in Houston, Texas as Salutatorian of the Class of 1976. He then studied at the University of Texas in Austin (Bachelor of Arts in Chemistry with High Honors), Harvard University (Master of Science in Management and Public Policy) and University of Texas at Austin (Doctor of Philosophy in Business Administration). As an exchange student he also spent two years at LMU Munich. He has worked at the International Institute for Applied Systems Analysis in Laxenburg, Austria and for McKinsey & Company in Düsseldorf Germany.

He is the Founder and Director of the “Honors” Elite master's degrees Program in Business, Economics and Information Systems in the Faculty of Business and Economics at the University of Regensburg, which is a member of the Elite Network of Bavaria.

He was Co-Director of the Exist-High Technology Entrepreneurship Post Graduate Program funded by the German Federal Ministry of Education and Research from 2000 to 2006. He was also on the Advisory Board of the Hans Lindner Institute, a private foundation that supports small business and entrepreneurship activities in Eastern Bavaria.

He has a published over 50 academic articles in Die Betriebswirtschaft, Strategic Management Journal, Management Science, California Management Review, Research Policy, Business Horizons, Columbia Journal of World Business, and Telecommunications Policy. His has also written several chapters and edited the book on Entrepreneurship In 2009, he was ranked 62 in the German business newspaper Handelsblatt’s ranking of the Top 200 (from a total of 2000) Professors of Business Administration in Germany, Austria and Switzerland based on research productivity. His research interests include the strategic management of technology, high technology entrepreneurship, and the relationships between technology, public policy, and economic development.

Since 2014, he is the Chairman of the Board of the MÜNCHNER KREIS, an international non-profit association dedicated to the digital transformation. He became a full member of acatech, the German Academy of Technology in Fall 2015.

== Honors ==
2009 Handelsblatt Ranking of the Top 200 Business Professors in – Lifetime Rank 62

1998 State of Bavaria Teaching Award

1993 Sarah Moss Fellowship, University of Georgia

1990 SEL Foundation Fellowship, Munich, Germany

1990 Sarah Moss Fellowship, University of Georgia

1989 Lilly Fellowship, University of Georgia

1985 University of Texas Graduate Fellowship

1980 German American Club and Fulbright Scholarships to LMU Munich

1980 Phi Beta Kappa

1978 Rotary International Foundation Fellowship to LMU Munich
