= Otto S. Wolfbeis =

German chemist

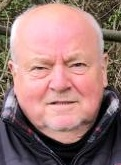
Otto Wolfbeis

Otto S. Wolfbeis (born 18 July 1947) was a professor of analytical chemistry and Interface chemistry at the University of Regensburg in Germany until his retirement in 2013.

== Biography ==
Wolfbeis studied chemistry at the University of Graz (Austria) and in 1972 received a PhD in organic chemistry. He then was a post-doctoral fellow at the Max-Planck-Institute for Radiation Chemistry (now Max Planck Institute for Chemical Energy Conversion) in the group of Prof. Koerner von Gustorf. In 1974 he became an assistant professor at the Institute of Organic Chemistry at the University of Graz. In 1978 he was a visiting scientist at Technische Universität Berlin in the group of Prof. Ernst Lippert. He became a lecturer (Dozent) in 1979 after submission of a habilitation thesis entitled Syntheses and Spectroscopic Properties of Laser Dyes and Fluorescent Indicators. In the years thereafter, he was a visiting professor at Tufts University, Hebrew University of Jerusalem, and Wuhan University. From 1991 to 1994 he also was the Founding Director of the Institute for Optical Sensors at Joanneum Research (now the Institute for Surface Technology and Photonics). In 1995 he became a full professor at Regensburg University and established its Institute of Analytical Chemistry, Chemo- and Biosensors. As an academic teacher, Wolfbeis has supervised the work of more than 80 PhD students, post-doctoral fellows and Humboldt fellows. Many of them meanwhile have made an impressive academic career.

== Career ==
Wolfbeis was the director of the institute, dean of the faculty for chemistry and pharmacy, member of the senate of the university, and its vice president. He also acted as the head of the Laboratory for Environmental Radioactivity, as the Regensburg representative of the Bavarian Elite Academy. He initiated the establishment of a Fraunhofer Group for Optical Sensing in Regensburg (now part of the Fraunhofer Research Institution for Microsystems and Solid State Technologies (EMFT) in Munich). Wolfbeis founded the conference series on Methods & Applications in Fluorescence in 1989 and was the chairman of its steering committee until 2007. In 1992 he organized the first conference on optical methods for chemical sensing and biosensing Europtrode. In 1996 he founded, with Robert Kellner (Vienna), the Advanced Study Course on Optical Sensors (ASCOS), a summer school for interdisciplinary training in the various technologies needed in biochemical optical sensing.

The main research activities of Wolfbeis were in molecular fluorescent probes, in chemical sensors and biosensors (including fiber optic sensors), luminescent nanomaterials, upconverting particles, photonic crystals, electrochemical sensors and in optical imaging. He has published more than 500 publications in peer-reviewed journals Numerous articles have appeared that describe new (bio)sensor materials, electrochemical (bio)sensors, fluorescent nanosensors, methods of fluorescent imaging, and optical probes and indicators. Wolfbeis is nominated a co-inventor in around 40 patents. Several of his discoveries have led to industrial products. His research formed the basis for a spin-off company that is fabricating fibre optic sensor, sensor layers and imagers for oxygen, pH values and CO_{2}.

== Awards ==
- 1989: Heinrich-Emanuel-Merck Prize
- 1996: Friedrich-Emich Prize
- 2010: Křižík Medal (Czech Acad. Sci.)
- 2013: Clemens-Winkler Medal (Ger. Chem. Soc.)

== Editorships ==
- Fiber Optic Chemical Sensors and Biosensors. CRC Press, Boca Raton, FL; 1991, ISBN 0-8493-5508-7 (vol. 1), ISBN 0-8493-5509-5 (vol. 2).
- 2000–2008: Editor of the Springer Series on Fluorescence. Springer, Berlin. ISSN 1617-1306.
- 2002–2007: Editor of the Springer Series on Chemical Sensors and Biosensors. Springer, Berlin. ISSN 1612-7617.
- 2002–2019: Editor-in-Chief of Microchimica Acta (Springer-Nature; Heidelberg-Berlin). ISSN 0026-3672 (printed); ISSN 1436-5073 (digital)
- 2012–2019: (Co-Editor-in-Chief; along with David Birch, Strathclyde, UK, und Yves Mely, Strasbourg, France) Methods and Applications in Fluorescence (Institute of Physics Publ.; London/Bristol). ISSN 2050-6120 (digital)
