= German-Israeli Future Forum Foundation =

The German-Israeli Future Forum Foundation (German: Stiftung Deutsch-Israelisches Zukunftsforum, DIZF; Hebrew: קרן פורום העתיד גרמניה-ישראל) is a charitable foundation based in Berlin. It was founded in 2007 by the Federal Republic of Germany and the State of Israel. It acts as a funding body and is directly involved in project implementation. The principal goal of the foundation is to promote German-Israeli cooperation. In the long term, this aim is realized chiefly through the following programs: project funding, the German-Israeli Future Network, the Sylke Tempel Fellowship and the Shimon Peres Prize.

== History ==
The concept for the Foundation was developed by the President of the Federal Republic of Germany and the President of the State of Israel to mark the 40th anniversary of the establishment of diplomatic relations between the two countries. The DIZF was officially founded in December 2007 and began its work in February 2009. The Foundation aims to promote contact between young people from Israel and Germany, and to support them in working together to forge a shared future based on democracy, freedom and tolerance as core values. The goal here is to encourage young specialists and managers aged 18–45 in particular to become involved in shaping German-Israeli relations.

The founding executive director was the former Ambassador Dr. Albert Spiegel. From 2009 to 2016, the Foundation was headed By Dr. Andreas Eberhardt. He was succeeded in April 2016 by Dr. Tamara Or, who has been executive director of the Foundation since that time. The work of the Foundation has also changed over the course of the years. While initially the main focus was on funding German-Israeli projects and language courses, today, the Foundation has diversified its activities and plays a more active and direct role in project work.

== Board of trustees ==
The board of trustees is the highest-level organ of the DIZF Foundation. Its task is to advise, support and monitor the work of the executive director. The 12 members of the Board of Trustees are highly respected individuals from the fields of academia, the media, culture, business and politics. Half are nominated by the German government and half by the Israeli government, respectively. Both governments are represented by one member each on the board of trustees. Since 2021, the board has been chaired by former Federal Minister for Economic Affairs and Energy, and Justice, Brigitte Zypries.

== Activities ==
As well as events, online talks, participation in expert discussions, public relations work, etc., the Foundation's main areas of activity are project funding, the German-Israeli Future Network, the Sylke Tempel Fellowship and the presentation of the Shimon Peres Prize.

=== Project funding ===
The Foundation funds future-oriented German-Israeli cooperation project.

In terms of their content, all the projects funded by the Foundation are aligned with at least one of the UN sustainability goals. The projects are realized in Israel and Germany to an approximately equal degree. Since the establishment of the Foundation, funding has been awarded to around 200 bilateral projects of this kind.

=== German-Israeli Future Network ===
The German-Israeli Future Network program was launched in 2018. Here, young activists, committed individuals and managers have the opportunity to find low-threshold partners for German-Israeli cooperative partnerships through volunteer “matchmakers” from the Network. According to the information submitted to the Foundation, almost half of the matchmakers are actively involved in civil society, around a third work in business and/or academia, and around a quarter work in the fields of technology and art and culture (multiple answers were possible). The online platform of the Future Network is provided by Clique, an Israeli start-up. In line with the 17th UN Sustainable Development Goal, “Partnership for the Goals”, the foundation launched the network program "G17 for Inclusion" in 2022 to build a network of German and Israeli organizations working with and for people with disabilities. In 2023, the "G17 for Pluralism" network program was launched.

=== Sylke Tempel Fellowship ===
Since 2019, the DIZF Foundation has organized a Fellowship program in memory of the journalist Dr. Sylke Tempel, who was a member of the board of trustees. Within the framework of the program, research scholarships are awarded to young academics and journalists from Germany and Israel.

The Fellowship program is implemented with cooperation partners who were associated with Sylke Tempel and whose work is aligned with the key focal areas of the year in question. During the first year in 2019, the Foundation cooperated with the German Association for East European Studies, the German Council on Foreign Relations and the Zentrum Liberale Moderne. The articles on Russian-speaking communities in Germany and Israel, which were produced within the scope of the Fellowship, were published in the “Osteuropa” journal.

In 2020 and 2021, the Sylke Tempel Fellowship focused on relations between Germany, Israel and the USA. Here, the DIZF Foundation is cooperating with the American Jewish Committee, the European Leadership Network, the “Internationale Politik” magazine and Women in International Security. The results were published in a special edition of “Internationale Politik”.

The 2022 Sylke Tempel Fellowship dealt with "China's Influence on Israel and the Middle East." The contributions of the fellows were published in a special issue of the journal Internationale Politik (IP). This cohort was a collaboration between the DIZF Foundation and the American Jewish Committee Berlin (AJC), Bar-Ilan University, the European Leadership Network (ELNET), and Women in International Security Germany e.V. (WISS.de).

The 2023/24 cohort focuses on "Values in Security Policy: From Military Strength to Feminist Foreign Policy." It is conducted in cooperation with the American Jewish Committee Berlin (AJC), Bar-Ilan University, Women in International Security Germany e.V. (WIIS.de), and the journal Internationale Politik (IP), which published the fellows' texts in a special issue in both German and English.

=== Shimon Peres Prize ===
Since 2017, in cooperation with the DIZF Foundation, the Federal Foreign Office has presented a prize, named after the Israeli Nobel Peace Prize winner Shimon Peres, to projects and individuals who have made a particularly valuable contribution to shaping German-Israeli relations.

Prizewinners to date:

- 2023 Hashomer Hatzair Deutschland e.V., Hashomer Hatzair in Israel, Havatzelet Group Israel, Jugendbildungsstätte Kurt Löwenstein in Werneuchen/Werftpfuhl (Germany), ROSBOT (Germany) with the project "Finding Romi – an intergenerational history project" And the initiative "VTUU – Viel Theater um uns!" by the Helmut-Schmidt-Gymnasium, with the Sha’ar HaNegev High School in Sderot (Israel), Jaffa Theatre in Tel Aviv (Israel), Almehabash Theatre in Rahat (Israel) with the project "Where does hatred come from?"
- 2022 Hebrew University of Jerusalem (Israel), American Jewish Committee Berlin (Germany), Partners & Company Jerusalem (Israel), TikTok Germany and Werk21 in Berlin (Germany) with the project "Creating Holocaust Awareness Among German and Israeli Youth on TikTok"And the Strascheg Center for Entrepreneurship at the Munich University of Applied Sciences (Germany), the University of Applied Sciences for Economics and Management, the Khalifa University in Abu Dhabi (UAE), the Eastern Bavarian Technical University in Regensburg (Germany), the Deggendorf Institute of Technology (Germany), Tech7 in Beer Sheva (Israel) with the project Bavaria Israel Partnership Accelerator (BIPA)
- 2021 Martin Buber Society of Fellows at the Hebrew University of Jerusalem (Israel), Institute for Sexual Research, Sexual Medicine, and Forensic Medicine at the University Medical Center Hamburg-Eppendorf (Germany) with the project "InterCare & Awareness" And the Institute for National Security Studies Tel Aviv (Israel), Shenkar College in Ramat Gan (Israel), Goethe Institute e.V. in Munich (Germany), Berlin University of the Arts (Germany) with the project "Negotiation Matters"
- 2020 Society for the Protection of Nature in Israel (SPNI) (Israel), Naturschutzbund Deutschland e.V. (NABU) (Germany), Naturschutzjugend (NAJU) (Germany) with their project “Environmental Educational Partnership between Israel and Germany” and Bildungsstätte Bredbeck (Germany), Sapir College Sderot, Department of Public Policy and Administration (Israel), University of Bremen, Institute for Religious Studies (Germany) with their project “Inclusion in German and Israeli Societies – challenges in social and youth work”
- 2019 Arbeitsgemeinschaft Jugendfreizeitstätten Sachsen e.V. (Germany) and Sapir College (Israel) with their project “Professional Exchange: Understanding and Responsibilities” and Adam Institute for Democracy and Peace (AI) (Israel) and Akademie Führung & Kompetenz at the Center for Applied Policy Research, LMU Munich (CAP) (Germany) with their project “More than a Democracy”
- 2018 other music e.V./Yiddish Summer Weimar (Germany) & Music Department University of Haifa/Arab-Jewish Orchestra (Israel) with their project “Caravan Orchestra” and Gesher Multicultural Film Fund (Israel), ANU-Making Change (Israel), GREENproductions, (Israel) & One Two Films (Deutschland) with their project “Out of Place”
- 2017 Microfy (Israel) & Migration Hub (Germany) with their project "Exchange on Social Entrepreneurship" and Yasmeen Godder Company (Israel) & Monica Gillette (Germany) with their project "Störung"

==== Shimon Peres Special Prize 2024 ====
In response to the Hamas attack on Israel on October 7, 2023, the Shimon Peres Special Prize 2024 will be awarded in addition to the regular Shimon Peres Prize. The Special Prize will honour exceptional achievements and the commitment of Israeli civil society in dealing with the impact of October 7, 2023.

=== Cooperation Projects ===
In addition to the regular programs of the DIZF Foundation, the foundation regularly carries out cooperation projects. In June 2022, the project "Building Bridges for the Future" was launched, which was initiated in cooperation with the Central Association of German Crafts (ZVDH) and the Leo Baeck Institute Jerusalem (LBI). As part of an exchange program for skilled workers between Israeli and German apprentices, a bilateral exchange of knowledge and experience is to be established to create a long-term network of various trades from Israel and Germany. The renovation of the Leo Baeck Institute in Jerusalem serves as the starting project.

After the Hamas attacks on October 7, 2023, the DIZF Foundation, together with the American Jewish Committee Berlin (AJC) Berlin, the Alfred Landecker Foundation, and the WerteInitiative, launched a social media campaign under the hashtag #BelieveIsraeliWomen to raise awareness for forms of sexualized and misogynistic violence by Hamas.
