= Udo Hebel =

German Professor of American studies (born 1956)

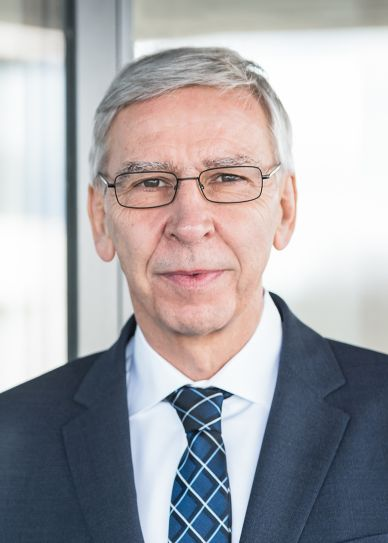
- Udo Hebel
- Born: 24 April 1956 (age 70)
- Website: http://www.uni-regensburg.de/language-literature-culture/american-studies/faculty/prof-dr-udo-hebel/index.html

Udo J. Hebel (born 24 April 1956) is a German professor of American studies. He has been president of the University of Regensburg since 1 April 2013. He was selected as one of the ten best university rectors in Germany by the German Association of University Professors and Lecturers.

== Life ==
Udo Hebel studied American studies, English studies, German studies, and pedagogy at the University of Mainz and, as a Fulbright scholar, in the US state of Mississippi. After passing the first and second Staatsexamen as a teacher, he was awarded a scholarship from the Landes-Graduiertenförderung Rheinland-Pfalz and was awarded his doctorate summa cum laude from the University of Mainz in 1988. From 1986 to 1995 he was an academic at the University of Mainz and gained his habilitation for the subject of American studies in 1995.

He spent several years of study and research in the United States: at the University of Michigan in Ann Arbor, at Harvard University, at the American Antiquarian Society in Worcester and as a visiting professor at a number of institutions, including Colorado College in Colorado Springs.

In 1995 Hebel was appointed professor of American literature and cultural history at the University of Potsdam; from 1996 to 1998 he was professor of North American literature at the University of Freiburg.

Since 1998 Udo Hebel has held the chair of American studies at the University of Regensburg.

At the University of Regensburg, Hebel was dean and dean of research at the Faculty of Language, Literature, and Cultural Studies and from 2006 to 2008 prorector of study and research. Since 2007 he has been the head of the Frühstudium programme (parallel university education for gifted secondary students) at the University of Regensburg.

On 20 July 2012 he was elected the tenth president of the University of Regensburg. His term of office began on 1 April 2013 and has been extended until 31 March 2023 by the University Council in October 2016.

== Research ==
=== Main research interests ===
His main research interests have been:

- American cultures of memory
- American visual culture (especially painting/photography)
- Transnational American studies
- Literatures and cultures of the American colonial period (especially Puritan New England)
- German–American cultural relations
- American drama and theatre / American cultural performances

=== Publications ===
The list of publications by Udo Hebel comprised 13 books, several journal issues edited by him, and more than 60 papers from the interdisciplinary field of American studies.

==== Monographs and books ====
- Udo Hebel (ed.): "Transnational American Studies". American Studies Monograph Series 222. Heidelberg: Winter, 2012.
- Udo Hebel, Christoph Wagner (ed.): "Pictorial Cultures and Political Iconographies: Approaches, Perspectives, Case Studies From Europe and America". Berlin/New York: De Gruyter, 2011.
- Udo Hebel (ed.): "Transnational American Memories. Media and Cultural Memory 11". Berlin/New York: De Gruyter, 2009.
- Udo Hebel: "Einführung in die Amerikanistik / American Studies" [Introduction to American Studies]. Stuttgart: Metzler, 2008.
- Udo Hebel: "Twentieth-Century American One-Act Plays: Historical Survey, Genre Conventions, Major Representatives, Suggestions for Teaching". Akademie-Vorträge 29. Dillingen: ALP, 2006.
- Udo Hebel, Martina Kohl (ed.): "Visual Culture in the American Studies Classroom: Proceedings of the U.S. Embassy Teacher Academy". Vienna: RPO, 2005.
- Udo Hebel: "Forefathers' Day Orations, 1769–1865: An Introduction and Checklist". Worcester, MA: American Antiquarian Society, 2003.
- Udo Hebel (ed.): "Sites of Memory in American Literatures and Cultures". American Studies Monograph Series 101. Heidelberg: Winter, 2003.
- Udo Hebel (ed.): "The Construction and Contestation of American Cultures and Identities in the Early National Period". American Studies Monograph Series 78. Heidelberg: Winter, 1999.
- Udo Hebel: "Those Images of jealousie": Identitäten und Alteritäten im puritanischen Neuengland des 17. Jahrhunderts" ["Those Images of jealousie": Identities and Alterities in Puritan New England of the 17th century]. Mainzer Studien zur Amerikanistik 38. Frankfurt: Lang, 1997.
- Udo Hebel, Karl Ortseifen (ed.): "Transatlantic Encounters: Studies in European-American Relations Presented to Winfried Herget". Trier: Wissenschaftlicher Verlag, 1995.
- Udo Hebel: "Intertextuality, Allusion, and Quotation: An International Bibliography of Critical Studies. Bibliographies and Indexes in World Literature 18". New York: Greenwood, 1989.
- Udo Hebel: "Romaninterpretation als Textarchäologie: Untersuchungen zur Intertextualität am Beispiel von F. Scott Fitzgeralds This Side of Paradise" [Interpretation of novels as textual archeology: Studies on intertextuality based on F. Scott Fitzgerald's This Side of Paradise]. Mainzer Studien zur Amerikanistik 23. Frankfurt am Main: Lang, 1989.

==== Journal issues ====
- Udo Hebel (ed.): Amerikastudien/American Studies 48 (2003) – 56.1 (2011)
- Udo Hebel, Wolfgang Hallet (ed.): "Short Plays: Staging Women's Lives." Double Issue Der fremdsprachliche Unterricht [Foreign language teaching] 41.85/86 (2007).
- Udo Hebel (ed.): "Amerikastudien/American Studies at 50". Double Issue Amerikastudien/American Studies 50.1/2 (2005).

==== German Research Foundation project ====
From July 2010 to August 2013 Udo Hebel was project leader of the German Research Foundation project "Festreden zur Erinnerung an die koloniale Gründung Neuenglands als Ursprung der USA aus der Zeit 1770 bis 1865" (Speeches commemorating the colonial settlement of New England as the origin of the USA from the period of 1770 to 1865).

== Offices, memberships, and awards ==
=== Offices ===
- Chairman of the International Committee of the American Studies Association (USA) (2013– )
- President (2011– ), Vice President (1999–2002) and member of the Advisory Board (1999– ) of the Deutschen Gesellschaft für Amerikastudien (DGfA) (German Society for American Studies)
- Founding director of the Regensburg European American Forum (REAF) (2008– )
- Editor of Amerikastudien/American Studies (2002–11)
- Deputy Director (2001–04) and Vorstandsmitglied (2000–07) of the Bavarian America Academy

=== Memberships ===
- Deutsche Gesellschaft für Amerikastudien (DGfA)
- American Studies Association (ASA)
- European Association for American Studies (EAAS)
- American Antiquarian Society (1812), Worcester, MA (elected member)
- Deutscher Anglistenverband
- Modern Language Association (American Literature Section)
- Collegium for African American Research (CAAR)
- F. Scott Fitzgerald Society

=== Prizes, honours, awards ===
- 2009: Chairman of the seminar "Trust in America" at the Alpbach European Forum
- 2009–12: DFG project culture of memory (commemorative culture) in New England from 1770 to 1865
- 2008–13: ERASMUS Guest lectureship at the University of Ferrara, Italy
- 2005/06: Andrew Mellon Foundation American Studies International Initiative Grant
- 2003: Elected member of the American Antiquarian Society, Worcester, MA, USA
- 2001: Distinguished Max Kade Professor, Colorado College, CO, USA
- 2000: Peterson Fellow, American Antiquarian Society, Worcester, MA, USA
- 1992–93: American Council of Learned Societies Research Fellow, Harvard University
- 1984–1986: Grant from the Landes-Graduiertenförderung Rheinland-Pfalz
- 1978–79: Fulbright Scholarship; Mississippi College, Clinton, MS, USA

=== Miscellaneous ===
- Assessor for the German American Fulbright Commission, Deutsche Forschungsgemeinschaft (DFG), Deutscher Akademischer Austauschdienst (DAAD), Ebeling Fellowship of the DGfA and the American Antiquarian Society, Robert Bosch Foundation, Alexander von Humboldt Foundation
- Accreditation assessor for German universities (AQUIN, AQUAS, ZEvA)
- Assessor for appeal procedures at German, American, British, Dutch, and Austrian universities
- Member of the David Thelen Award Committee of the Organization of American Historians (OAH)
- Member of the Advisory Board of the Gutenberg-Forschungskollegs, at the University of Mainz
