= Verena Brunschweiger =

German media personality

Verena Brunschweiger (born 1980 in Passau) is a German media personality and author.

== Biography ==
She was born Verena Eleonore Maier and studied German Studies, English Studies, and Philosophy at university. She received her doctorate in Medieval German Studies from the University of Regensburg in 2007. Since 2018, she has worked as a secondary school teacher in Regensburg.

In 2013, she published her first non-fiction book, *Fuck Porn*, against the spread of pornography in everyday life. In 2019, her book Childfree Instead of Childless was published, reaching number 40 on the Spiegel bestseller list for paperback non-fiction. In it, as well as in numerous subsequent interviews, she advocated for antinatalism for climate policy reasons, i.e., foregoing children to reduce CO2 emissions and thus slow down climate change.

Brunschweiger rejected the wearing of face masks to combat the coronavirus pandemic and, according to her own statements, advocated for the protection of “vulnerable groups” during the coronavirus pandemic. She criticized the coronavirus measures, among other things, as “epidemic hysteria” and “fascist measures”.

== Publications ==
- Heroism and Femininity: Wolfram's Parzival, Gottfried's Tristan, and Richard Wagner's Music Dramas. Dissertation 2007 as Verena Maier-Eroms. Tectum Wissenschaftsverlag, 2009, ISBN 978-3-8288-9913-1
- Fuck Porn. Tectum Wissenschaftsverlag, 2013, ISBN 978-3-8288-3153-7
- Child-free instead of childless. Büchner-Verlag, Marburg, 2019, ISBN 978-3-96317-148-2
- The Childfree Rebellion: Why "too radical" is just radical enough. Büchner-Verlag, Marburg, 2020, ISBN 978-3-96317-196-3
- Fuck Sexism: Ageism, Lookism and Slutshaming. Polyamory. Edition Critic, Berlin, 2021, ISBN 978-3-946193-36-4
- Do Childfree People Have Better Sex?, Lantern Publishing and Media, New York City, 2022, ISBN 978-1-59056-664-0
- Child-free people of all countries, unite!, Edition Critic, Berlin, 2023, ISBN 978-3-946193-40-1
