= ELNET =

Pro-Israel lobby group in Europe

European Leadership Network
- Founded: October 22, 2007; 18 years ago.
- Revenue: US$9,100,000 (2023)
- Website: elnetwork.eu

The European Leadership Network (ELNET) is a non-governmental organization that promotes links between Europe and Israel. ELNET has described itself as “the most influential pro-Israel advocacy organisation in Europe", and its leaders have described it as "AIPAC for Europe".

== Activities ==
ELNET was created in 2007 as a European pro-Israel advocacy group to assist European partners in becoming more active politically in countering criticism of Israel in Europe. ELNET is registered in Belgium (responsible for the EU & NATO), France, Germany, Poland, the United Kingdom, Italy and Israel. The organization includes an additional US-based entity, Friends of ELNET (FELNET), that fundraises for the network.

In 2024, OpenDemocracy characterised ELNET's finances as a "mystery", and reported that ELNET has refused to disclose its major donors. In 2025, The Intercept reported that top American donors to Friends of ELNET include the William Davidson Foundation, the Newton and Rochelle Becker Charitable Trust and the Ocean State Job Lot Charitable Foundation, with other major donors including Jewish Federations in several cities.

ELNET arranges visits by European parliament members, government officials, and other European policy leaders to Israel. ELNET's role has been defined as "encouraging Jewish political activism".

=== United Kingdom ===
ELNET's UK branch is led by former MP Joan Ryan.

In 2024, Declassified UK reported that pro-Israel lobbyists, including ELNET, had donated to 13 out of Labour’s 25 cabinet members since they became MPs including prime minister Keir Starmer, foreign secretary David Lammy and Jonathan Reynolds, the latter is the one who "oversees arms exports to Israel as UK trade secretary". ELNET had organized a visit in Israel for Labour Friends of Israel (LFI)'s MPs including member of Starmer's cabinet and health secretary Wes Streeting. The visit organised by ELNET for Labour staffers "had ‘clear agenda’ to shape policies of the next government".

=== Germany ===
ELNET Germany, also known as ELNET Deutschland, is based in Berlin and has existed since 2014. It is focused on German speaking countries like Germany, Austria and Switzerland. Like in other European countries it is focused on conducting conferences, roundtables and background conversations to foster relations. In its advisory council are members like Karin Prien, Brigitte Zypries and fellows like Shlomo Shpiro together with other known personalities. It maintains cooperation with the Forum of Strategic Dialogue (FSD), the Federal Academy for Security Policy (BAKS), Chatham House, Hudson Institute, Konrad Adenauer Foundation and Reichman University(IDC Herzliya). There are further partnerships with AJC Berlin, German-Israeli Future Forum Foundation, UN Watch and several States of Germany.

== Positions ==
In a submission to the UN, ELNET wrote that Israel has a right not to allow the UN and other international organisations to operate on its territory, and freedom of choice as to the method and means by which it complies with its humanitarian obligations. In an article for the Jerusalem Post, the CEO of ELNET Israel stated that the West Bank is not occupied and that it has been designated for Jewish national self-determination.

The executive director of ELNET UK has described the characterization of Israel as an apartheid state as a "myth" with origins in a propaganda campaign by the Soviet Union. In the same article, she wrote that fighting antisemitism is inseparable from fighting criticism of Israel.

== See also ==
- American Israel Public Affairs Committee (AIPAC) - Pro-Israel lobby group in the United States
