= Sylke Tempel =

German journalist (1963–2017)

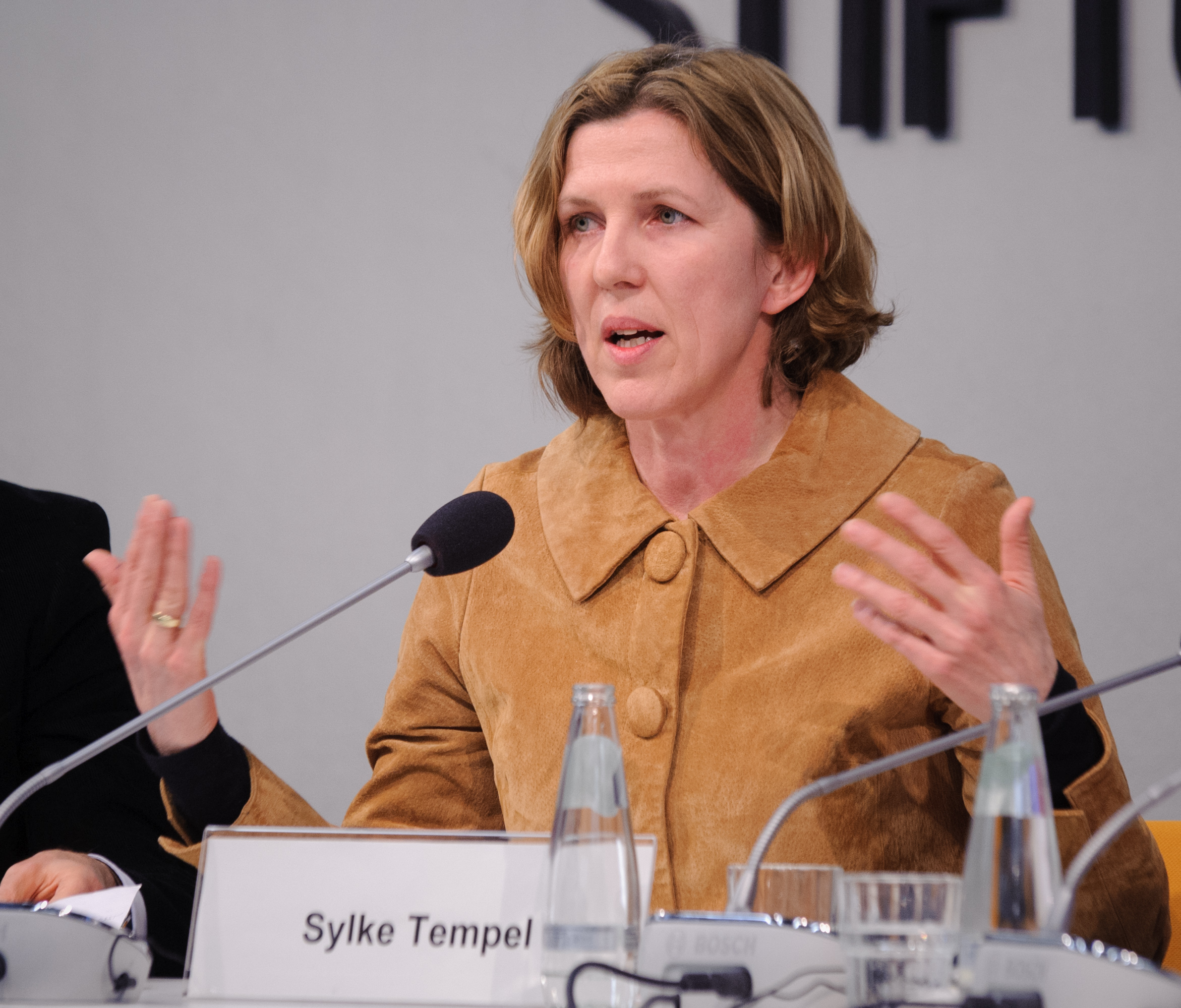
- Tempel in 2012
- Born: 30 May 1963; Bayreuth, Bavaria, West Germany
- Died: 5 October 2017 (aged 54); Tegel, Berlin, Germany
- Occupations: Writer, journalist
- Years active: 1993–2017

Sylke Tempel (30 May 1963 – 5 October 2017) was a German writer and journalist. At the time of her death, she had been the editor-in-chief of the foreign policy magazine Internationale Politik since 2008.

== Biography ==
Tempel was born in Bayreuth, a town in the Free State of Bavaria. She studied history, political science and Jewish studies at LMU Munich, prior to receiving a scholarship in New York between 1989 and 1991. She gained a PhD from the University of the Bundeswehr Munich where she served as an assistant to Michael Wolffsohn. Beginning her journalistic career in 1993, she worked in Israel as a Middle East correspondent. While there, she covered a range of events such as the Oslo I Accord, the Intifada and the assassination of Israeli Prime Minister Yitzhak Rabin in 1995. In 2003, she was a recipient of the Quadriga award.

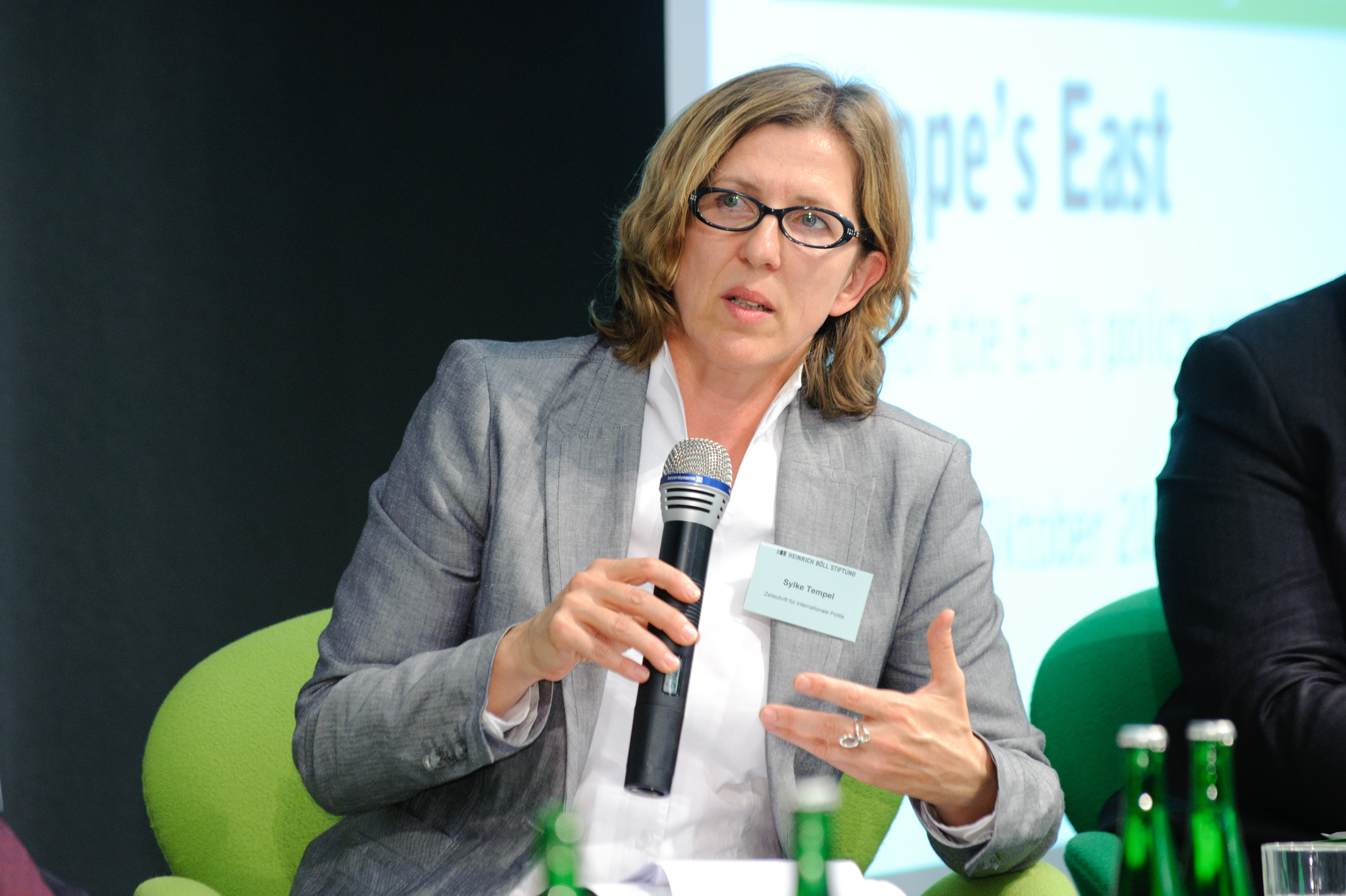
Tempel in October 2010

Tempel was a reporter for the publications Profil, Facts and Der Tagesspiegel, among others. She also wrote a number of young adult novels, published by Rowohlt Berlin, a part of the company Rowohlt. Since 2008, she had been the editor-in-chief of Internationale Politik, the magazine of the German Council on Foreign Relations.

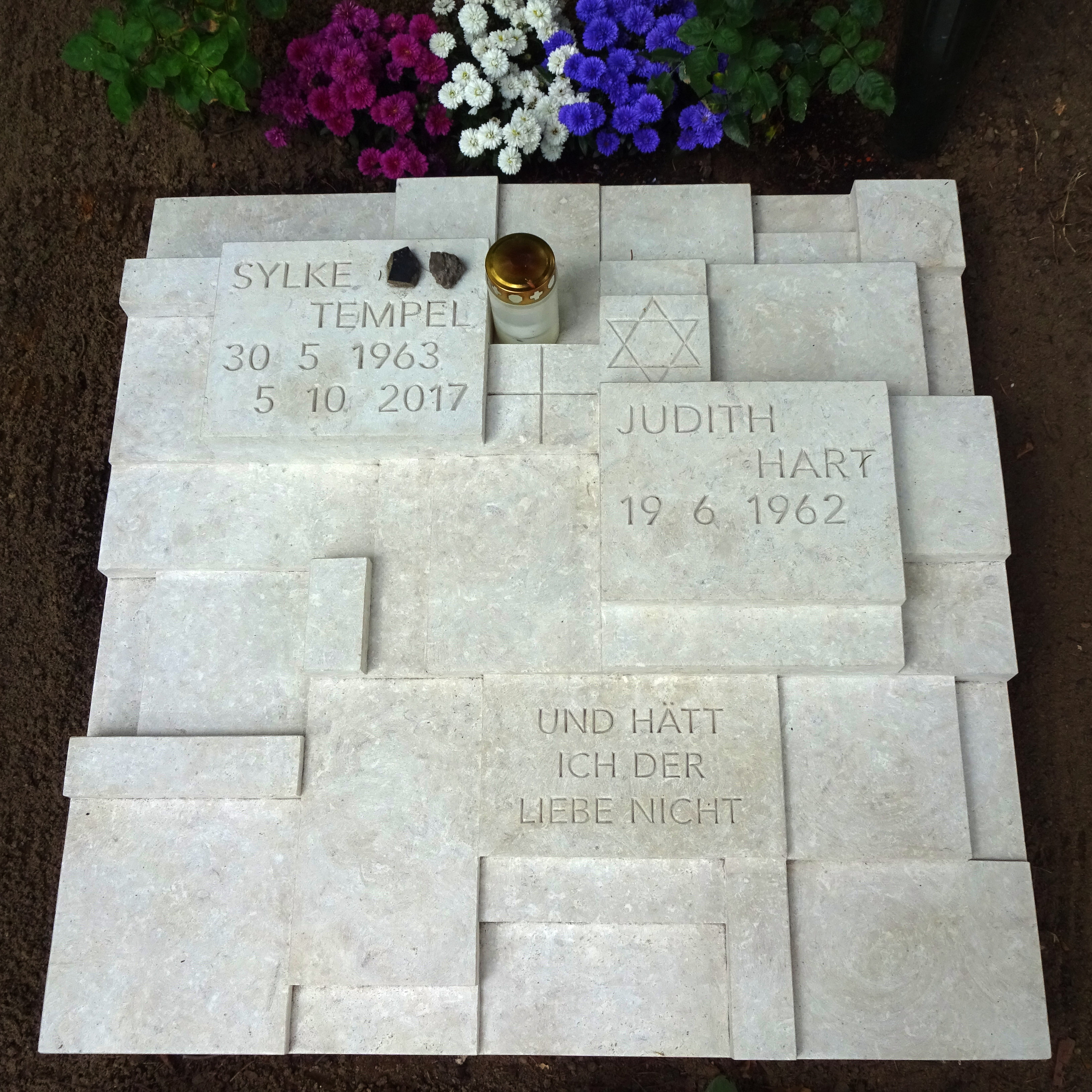
Tempel's grave at Friedhof Heerstraße in Charlottenburg-Wilmersdorf

Tempel lived in Berlin with her female partner. In 2017, she died in Tegel during Storm Xavier when she was struck by a falling tree. She was 54. She is buried at Friedhof Heerstraße in Charlottenburg-Wilmersdorf, Berlin.

== Commemoration ==
The German-Israeli Future Forum Foundation named their Sylke Tempel Fellowship under the auspices of Sigmar Gabriel and Tzipi Livni after her.
