= University of Regensburg =

University in Bavaria, Germany

- Universität Regensburg
- Type: Public university
- Established: 18 July 1962; 64 years ago
- Academic affiliations: Compostela Group of Universities
- Budget: € 238.4 million
- President: Udo Hebel
- Academic staff: 1,612
- Administrative staff: 2,098
- Students: 21,088
- Location: Regensburg, Bavaria, Germany; 48°59′57″N 12°05′35″E
- Campus: Urban
- Website: www.uni-regensburg.de/en
- Location within Germany Location within Bavaria

The University of Regensburg (German: Universität Regensburg) is a public research university located in the city of Regensburg, Germany. The university was founded on 18 July 1962 by the Landtag of Bavaria as the fourth full-fledged university in Bavaria. Following groundbreaking in 1965, the university officially opened to students during the 1967–1968 winter semester, initially housing faculties in Law and Business Sciences and Philosophy. During the summer semester of 1968 the faculty of Theology was created. Currently, the University of Regensburg houses eleven faculties.

The university actively participates in the European Union's SOCRATES programme as well as part of the Compostela-Group. Its most famous academic, Pope Benedict XVI, served as a professor there until 1977 and formally retained his chair in theology.

== History ==
Attempts to establish a university in Regensburg had been advocated since the late 15th century. In 1487, Duke Albrecht IV of Bavaria and the Regensburg city council sent a petition to Pope Innocent VIII to establish a university within the city. The idea was rejected, failing for economic reasons. In 1562, Croatian Protestant reformer Matthias Flacius again advocated the creation of a university in the city, arguing that a university in Regensburg would spread the ideas of the Protestant Reformation to Slavic lands. Protestant intellectuals again tried to establish a university in 1633, though their attempts were blocked by the arrival of imperial troops from orders of Holy Roman Emperor Ferdinand II. Following the end of the Second World War, a group of concerned intellectuals and academics in Eastern Bavaria established the Association of the Friends of the University (Verein der Freunde der Universität Regensburg e. V.) in 1948, advocating the creation of a university for Regensburg and the Upper Palatinate region. The association's advocacy proved successful in 1962 when the Bavarian Landtag authorized the creation of the university.

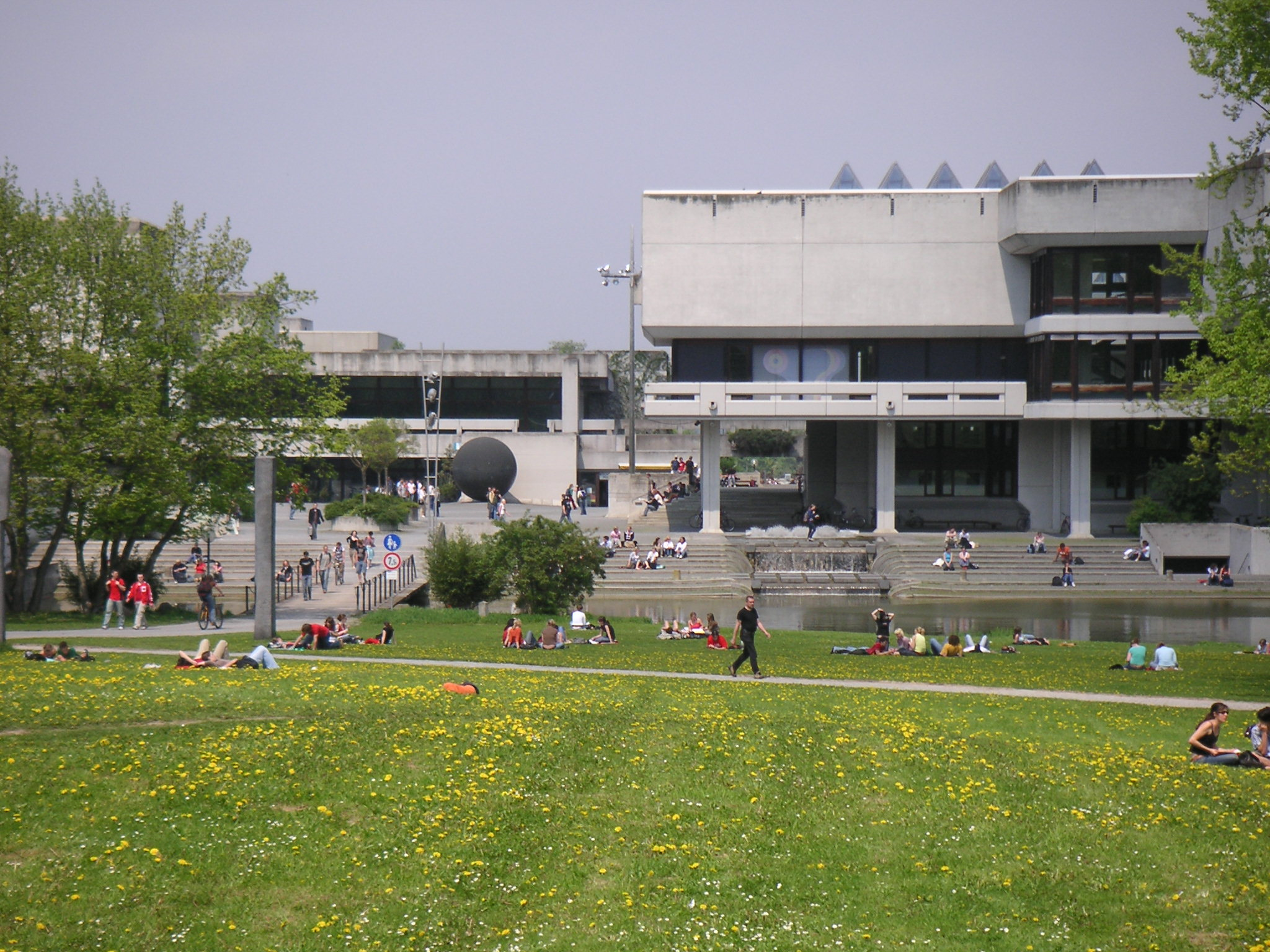
Campus and library

Construction began with the official groundbreaking ceremony on 20 November 1965. The first lectures began during the 1967 winter semester, with the faculties of Law and Business Sciences and Philosophy as the first schools for students. The following year, the faculty of Catholic Theology opened to students. Since 1967, the university has expanded to twelve faculties, including medicine, biology, psychology, and chemistry. The German Research Association has deeply supported a number of research projects in the university, including the fields of biochemistry and microbiology.

The university's most famous faculty member is Pope Benedict XVI, who taught from 1969 until he was appointed Cardinal and Archbishop of Munich in 1977. In 2006, one year following his election to the papacy, Benedict XVI returned to the University of Regensburg to make a highly controversial lecture that garnered the university international attention. The Pope is still listed as a professor of the university.

Another famous former faculty member, Karl Stetter, worked as head of the Archaea Center and the Department of Microbiology between 1980 and 2002. Among his discoveries were Pyrococcus furiosus in 1986, Aquifex aeolicus, Aquifex pyrophilus, and Nanoarchaeum equitans, discovered in 2002.

== Location and staff ==
Situated almost entirely on one central campus, the university is located south of Regensburg's inner city on a small incline south of the Danube River, and directly adjacent to the Regensburg University of Applied Sciences and the A 3 autobahn. The university itself consists of 150 hectares (280 acres) of land, encompassing a botanical garden and a stadium.

Including the affiliated university hospital, the University of Regensburg has approximately 4,200 employees including 312 professors, and teaches more than 20,000 students (summer term 2015). The university is located in the 2,000-year-old town of Regensburg, which has scenic countryside, the Donautal (Danube Valley), many bars and the nearby heights of the Bavarian Forest. Both the city and the campus provide recreational opportunities, including a number of nearby lakes.

== Faculties ==
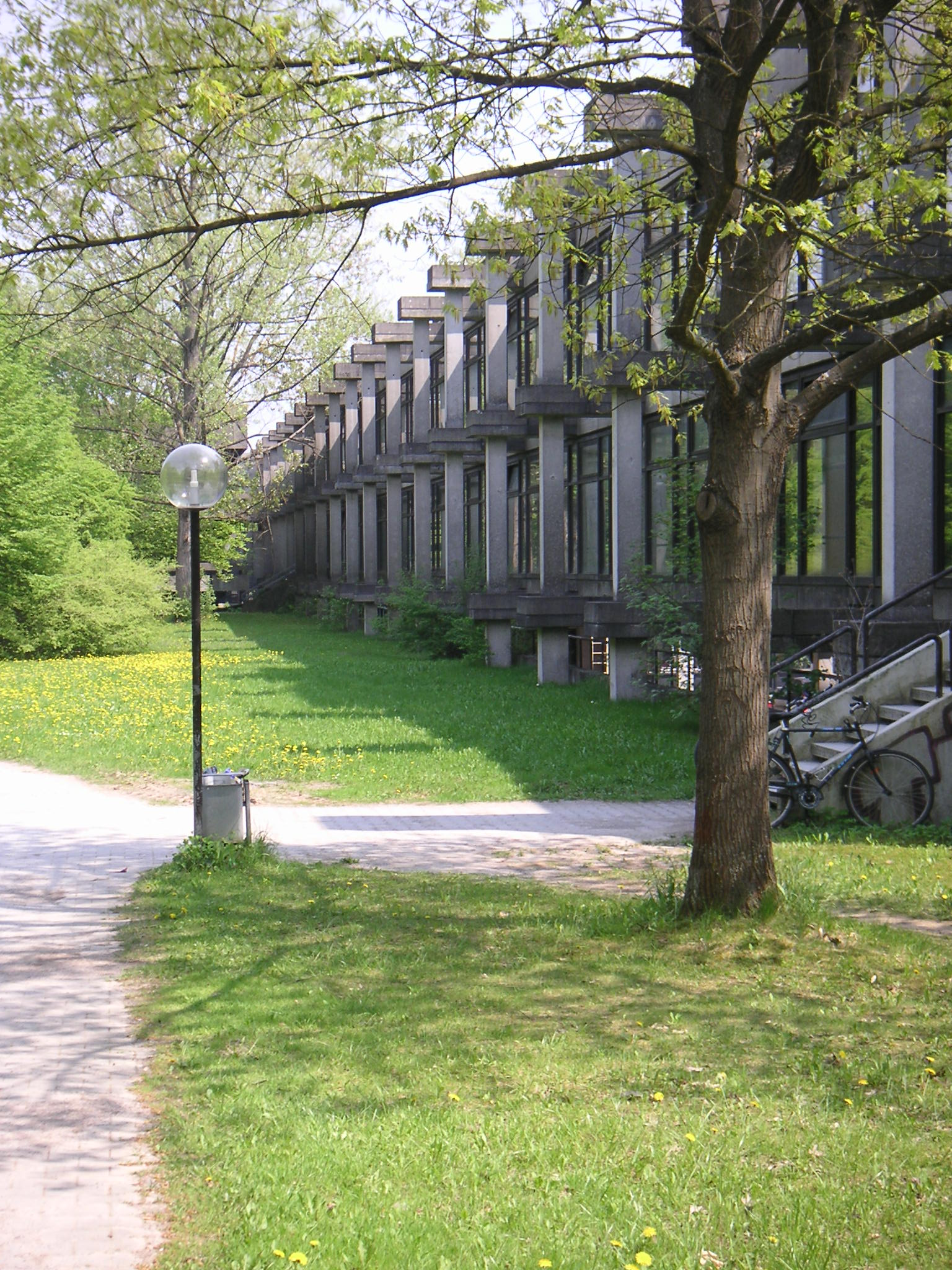
Faculty of physics

The university is structured into twelve faculties:

- Faculty of Catholic Theology
- Faculty of Law
- Faculty of Business and Economics
- Faculty of Medicine
- Faculty of Informatics and Data Science
- Faculty of Philosophy, Art History, History, and Humanities
- Faculty of Psychology, Education, and Sport Science
- Faculty of Languages, Literature, and Cultures
- Faculty of Mathematics
- Faculty of Physics
- Faculty of Biology and Pre-Clinical Medicine
- Faculty of Chemistry and Pharmacy
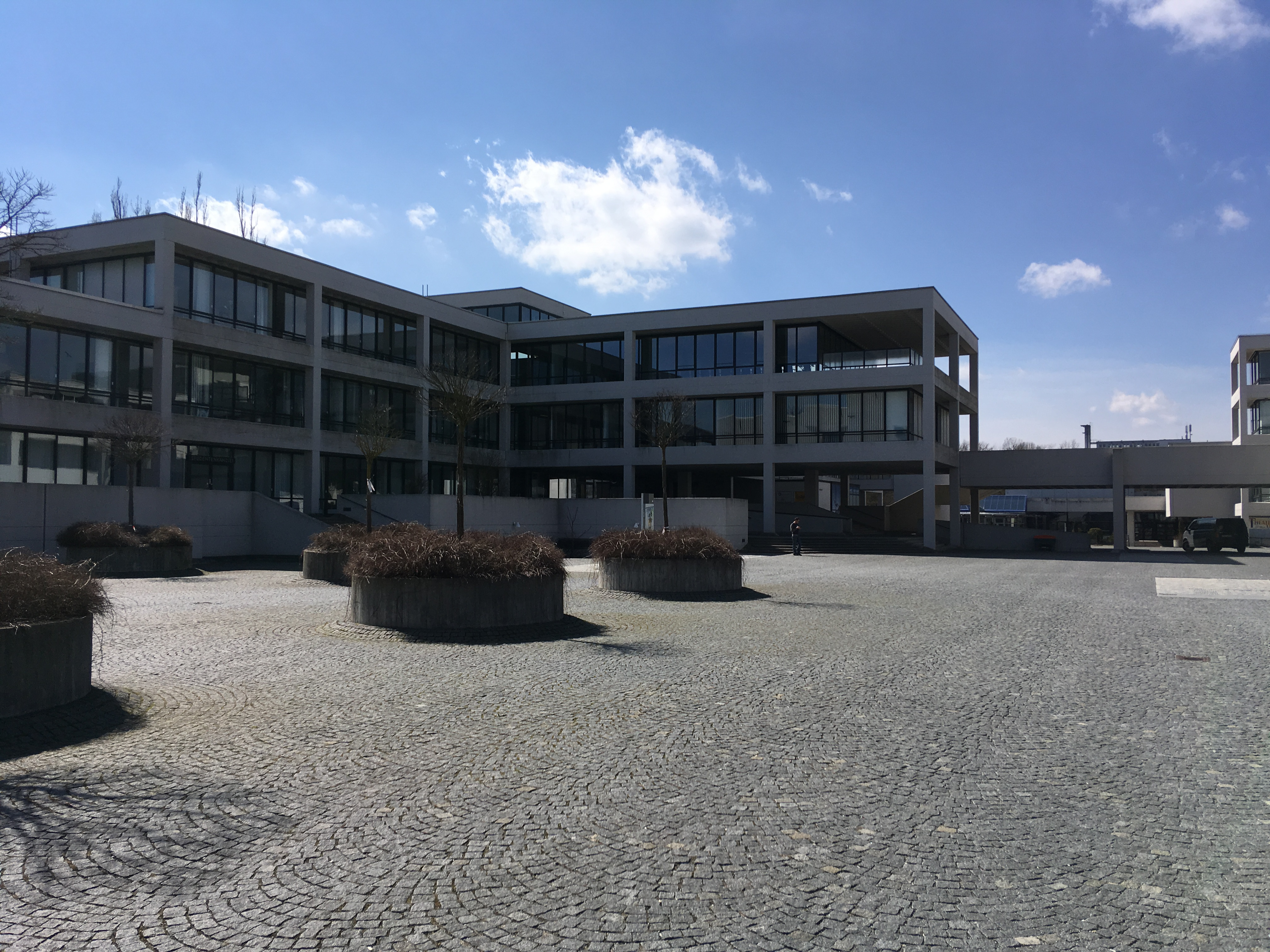
University Administration Building

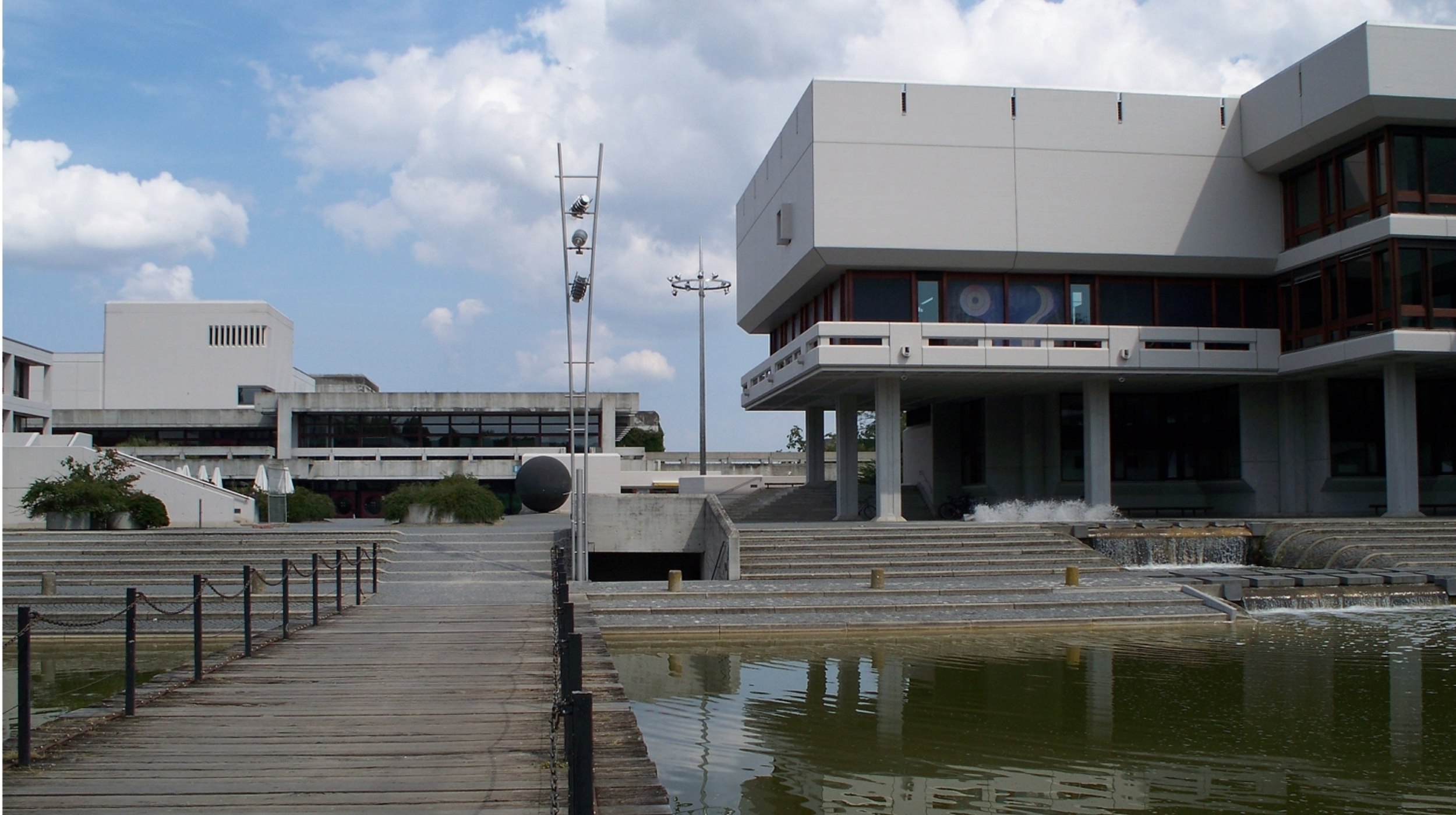
The campus in 2009

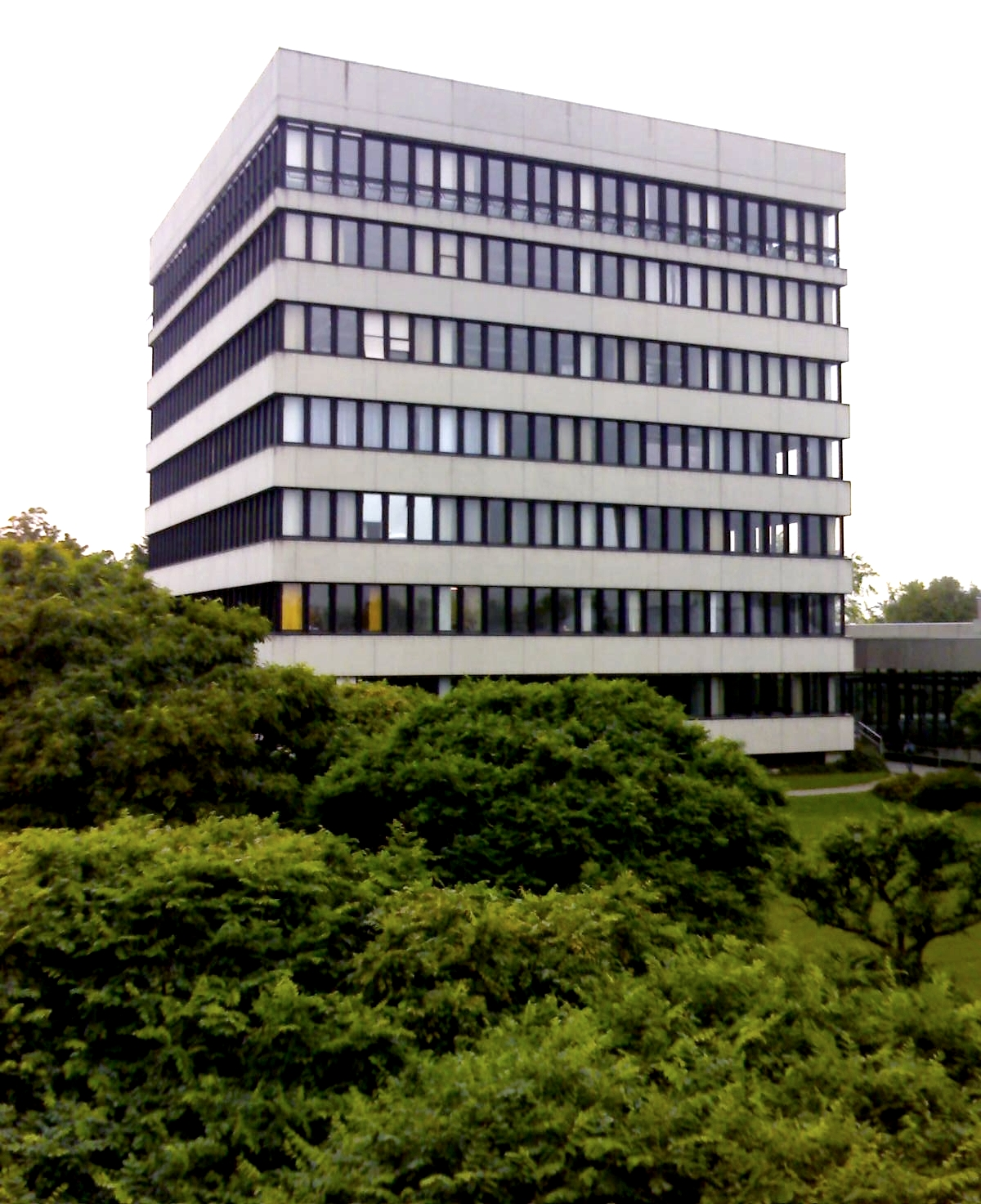
The old administration

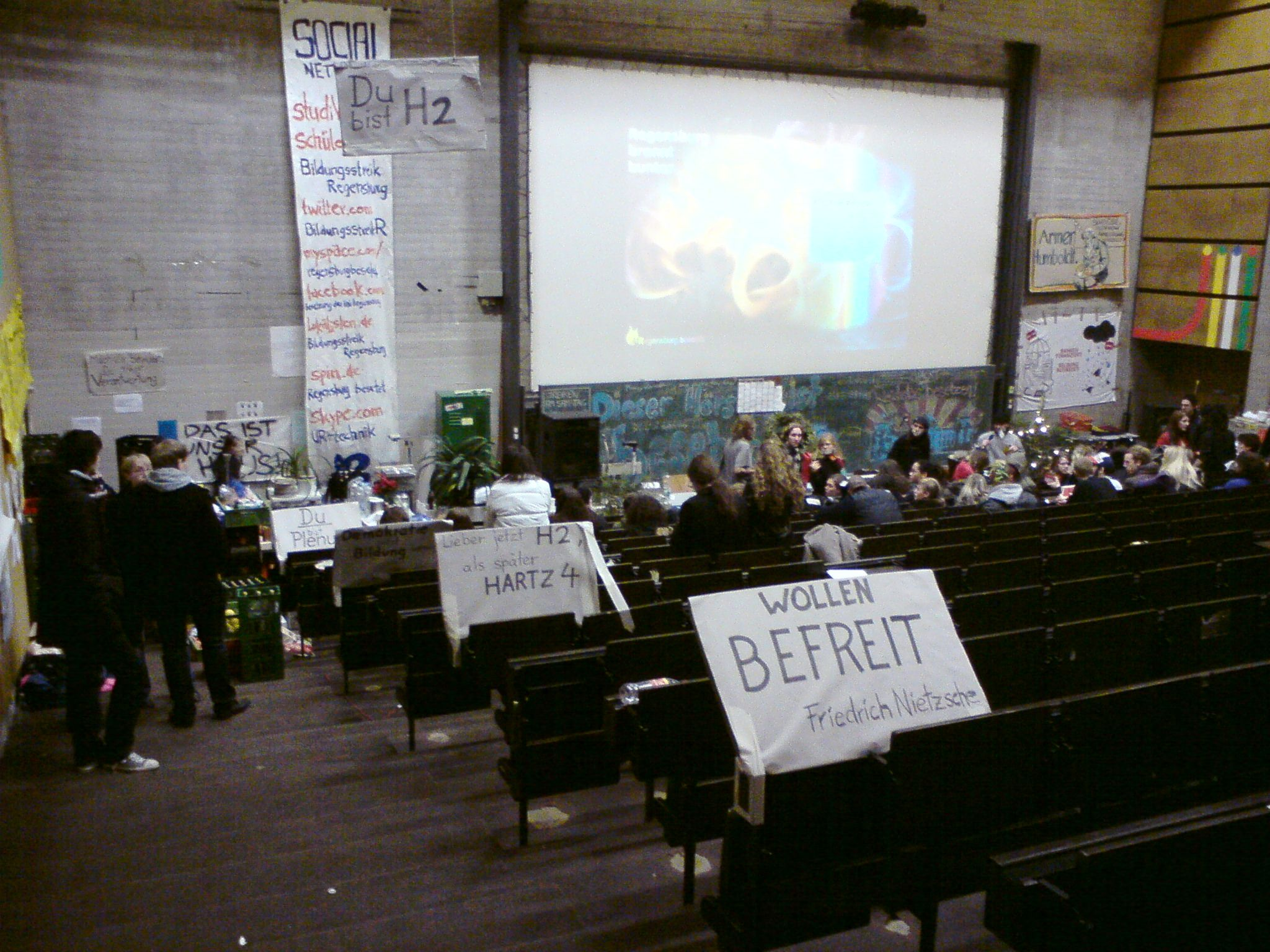
A student protest occupies a lecture theater, December 2009

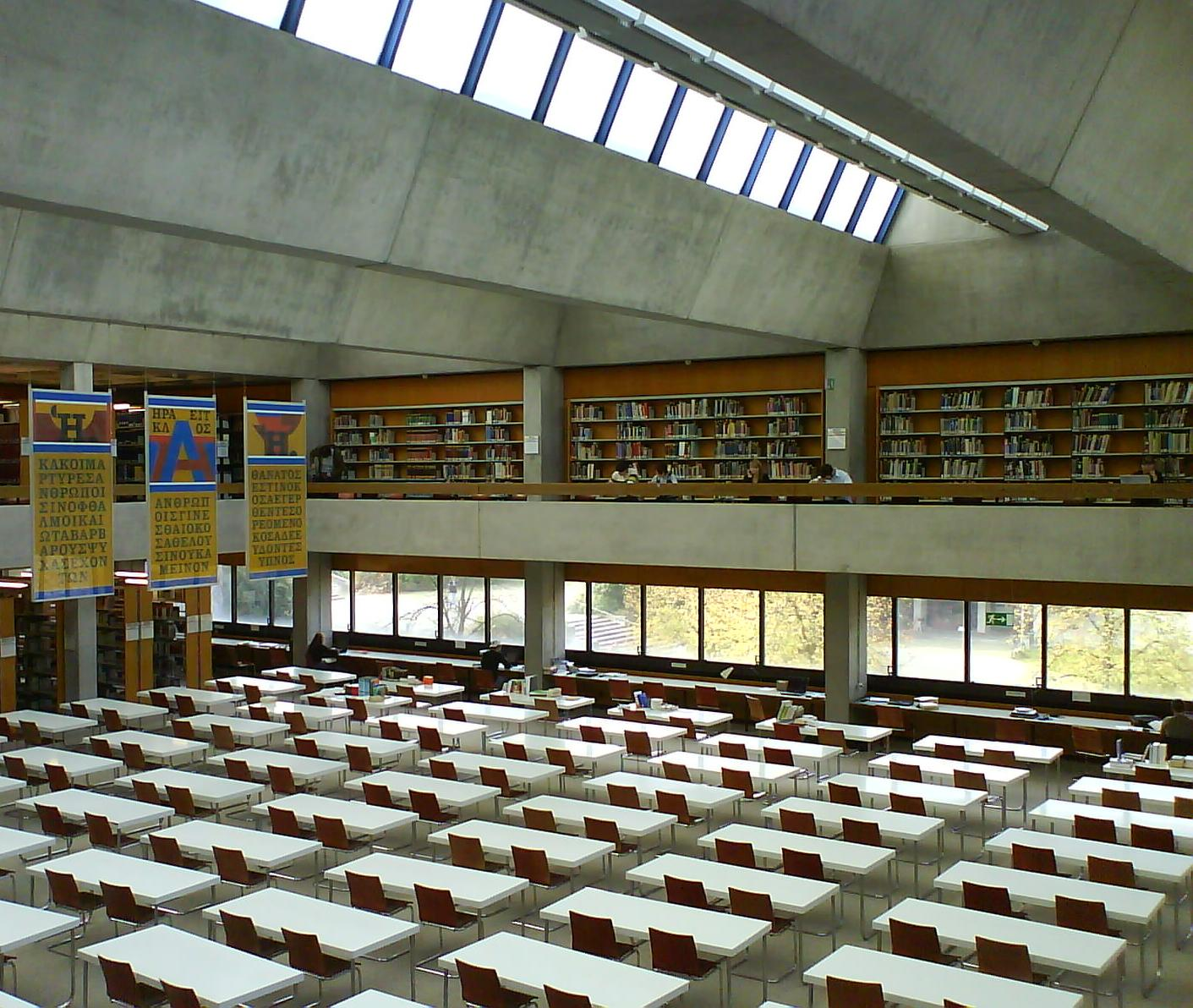
Library Philosophicum 2

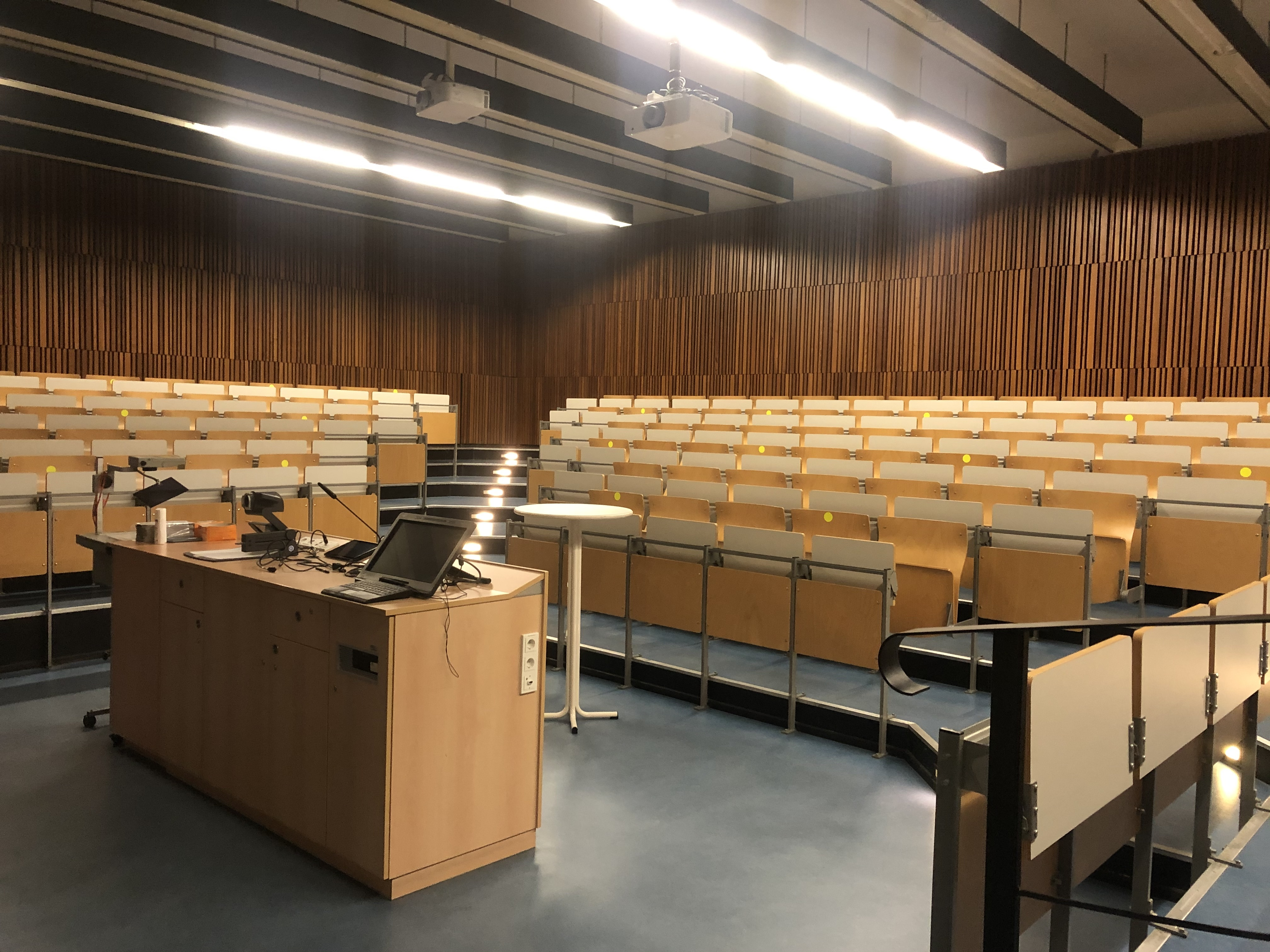
Hans Lindner Lecture Hall

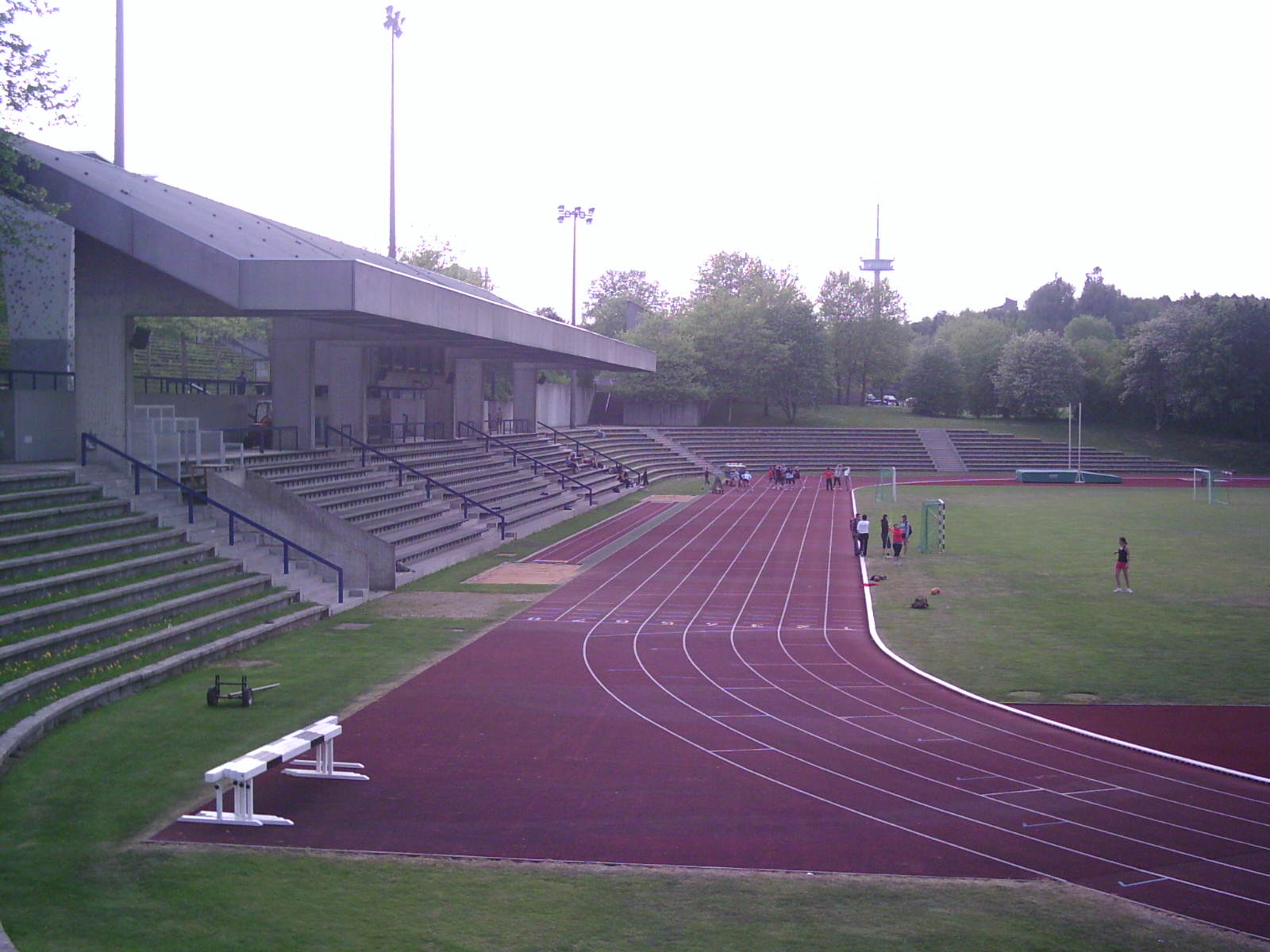
Athletics track and stand

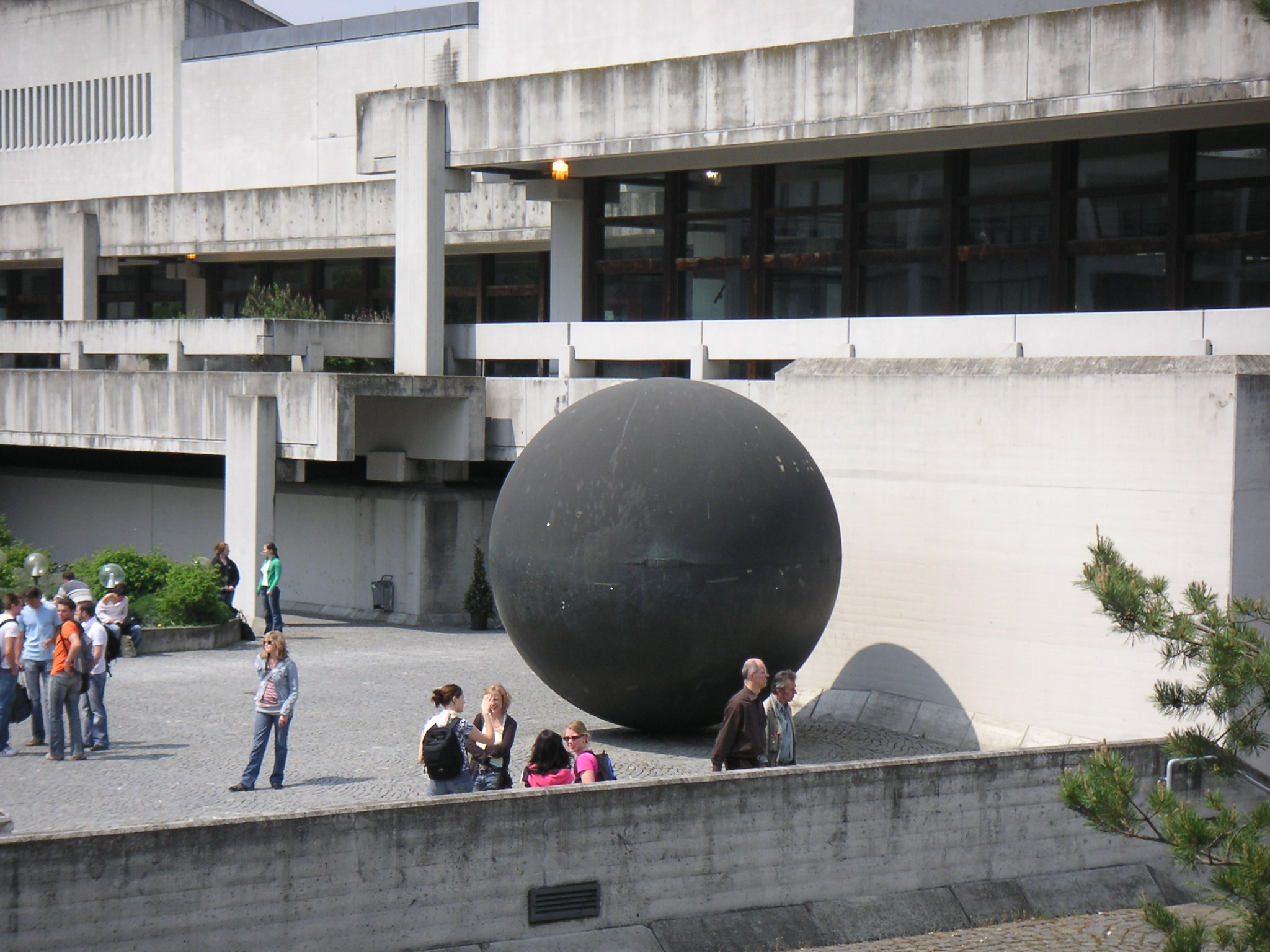
'The Sphere' sculpture

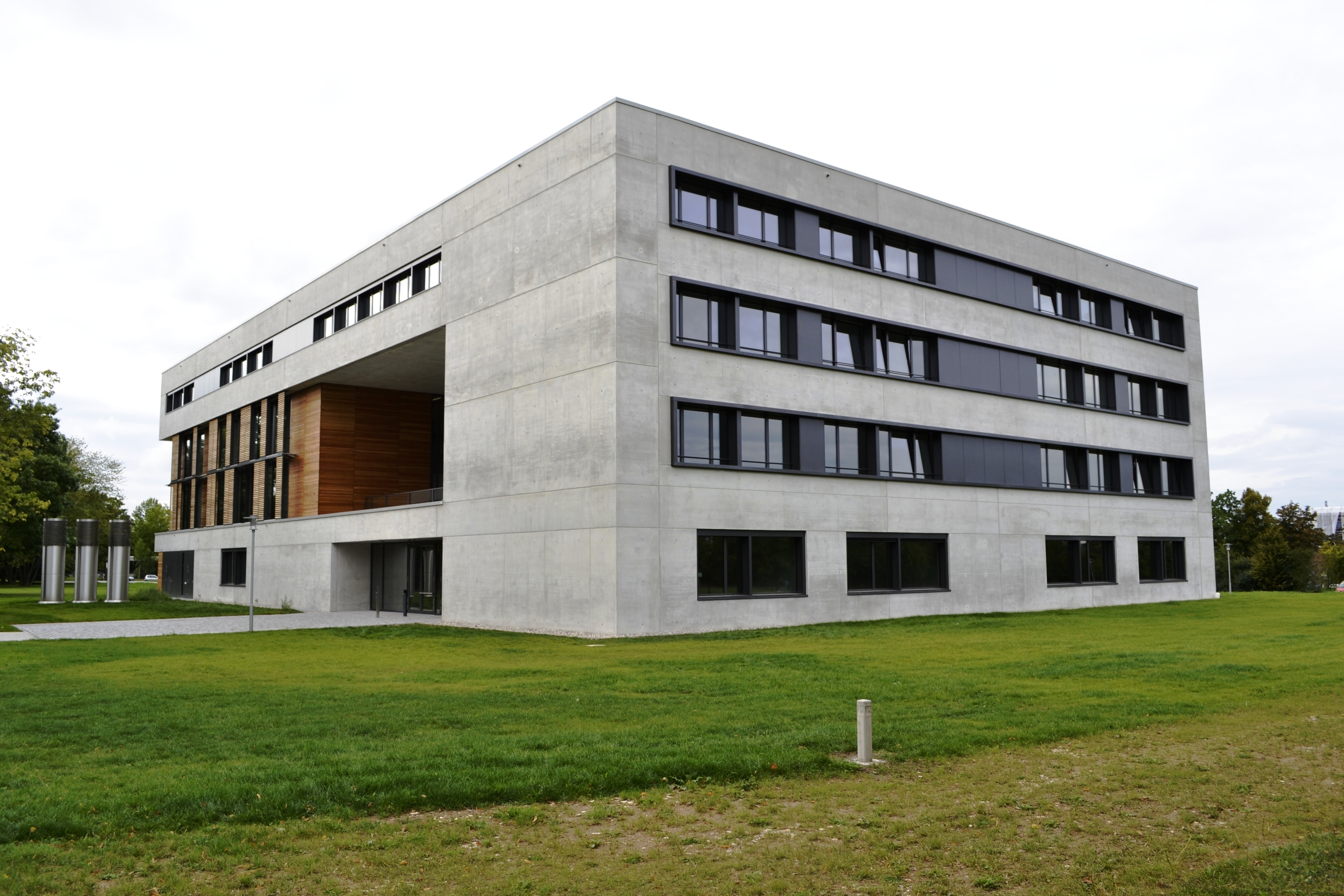
Vielberth building, housing the University's International Real Estate Business School

== Degree courses ==
With its twelve faculties, the university employs a wide variety of traditional programmes of study. The university was one of the first German universities to introduce modularized study programs following the Bologna model. Since 2000, most study programs have introduced bachelor's as well as master's degrees in recent years. Doctoral degrees can be obtained in most subjects as well.

Cross-disciplinary co-operation, the strengthening of key competences, project orientation, and a flexible study programme are the hallmarks of these new degree programmes, preparing students for many modern career options. For international students of law, the university offers an LL.M. course in German Law. All students, irrespective of their specialisation, are offered a number of programmes which can be taken to complement their main field of study. Among these are data processing, general language courses, specialised language courses (business, law etc.), courses in oral presentation and communication, and a programme in intercultural communication.

== Research ==
Key fields of activity include the Natural Sciences (Mathematics, Physics, Bio-Sciences, Chemistry and Pharmacy), the Humanities (History, Philologies) and Medicine. The German Research Association (DFG) currently sponsors two collaborative research centres (the SFB 1085 "Higher Invariants -interactions between Arithmetic Geometry and Global Analysis" of the Faculty of Mathematics and the CRC/Transregio 55 "Hadron Physics from Lattice QCD" of the Faculty of Physics), four research units and five interdisciplinary graduate colleges. The university participates in well over 30 EU projects.

In detail: according to a recent documentation of the DFG, the physics faculty of the university in 2009 held the first place in Bavaria, and the third one in Germany, concerning the financial support. Moreover, the high-energy physicists of the faculty form the center of a large international cooperation on a basic theory in the field, the Quantum Chromodynamics, with a large special computer, called QPACE.

Due to its geographical location near the former Iron Curtain border of the Czech Republic, the university considers itself a bridge. between East and West, institutionalised in a Leibniz-Institute for East- and Southeast European Studies. Working with partners in Europaeum, the University of Regensburg has set up an interdisciplinary centre for research and teaching on all aspects pertaining to Central, Eastern and Southeastern European countries. As part of the focus on Eastern Europe the University of Regensburg offers degrees like Southeastern-European Studies and Eastern European studies. The university is also home for the Bavarian University Centre for Central, East and Southeastern Europe (BAYHOST) which works on deepening cooperation between universities of the region and the state of Bavaria. The university closely cooperates with other institutions focusing on Eastern Europe in the city like the Institute for Eastern and Southeastern European studies, the Ostrecht institute (institute for Easteuropean legal studies) and the Hungarian institute among others. These institutions are all part of the centre for competence on Eastern Europe Regensburg.

== Rankings ==
University rankings

Overall – Global & National
QS World 2024	741–750	38
ARWU World 2023	401–500	25–31

The University of Regensburg has been featured in various international university rankings. According to the QS World University Rankings of 2024, it is ranked in the 741–750 range globally and holds the 38th position within Germany. Additionally, in the Academic Ranking of World Universities (ARWU) of 2023, the University of Regensburg placed in the 401–500 category worldwide, and secured a position between 25 and 31 in the national rankings.

The Handelsblatt Ranking 2014, one of the most relevant rankings for business administration in Germany, ranked the university's Department of Business Administration among the best 25 in German-speaking Europe.

== Service ==
On campus, students are provided with a large central cafeteria (Mensa) and several smaller ones, a pizzeria, a bank, a bookshop as well as various other shops. The open-access University Library, with its modern online catalogue and loan system, holds over 3.15 million books and periodicals. All students receive a PIN code for the computers, which grants free access to e-mail services and the Internet in all computer rooms throughout the campus. Students also have access to the services provided by the university's Computer Centre in any one of the more than 20 computer pools on campus and in most of the student dormitories.

Student residences, a number of which cater to students with special needs, are located in close proximity to the campus as well as in the city centre itself.

In addition to its academic function, the University of Regensburg encourages numerous extracurricular activities on campus. Various choirs, musical ensembles and art exhibitions (drawings, prints, sculpture and photography) testify to a dynamic cultural life on campus. Every year, more than ten student drama groups stage their productions in the theatre on campus. Well equipped audiovisual studios cater to students with an interest in film and music production.

The Sports Centre provides recreational courses for students. The choice of courses ranges from aikido to capoeira, and from kayaking to volleyball.

The university's International Office offers international students well developed orientation and integration programmes.

== Points of interest ==
- Botanischer Garten der Universität Regensburg, the university's botanical garden

== Partner Universities ==
The university currently maintains links with over 130 European academic institutions. The number of partner universities in countries of Central and Eastern Europe, Cyprus and the Baltic States has steadily grown ever since the initiation of the programme for associated countries. The university now has over 20 partners in these countries. Favourite destinations for students are and have always been Great Britain, followed by France, Italy and Spain. Universities of Kanazawa, Japan and Korea University, Seoul provide opportunities for Regensburg students to partake in teaching programs in English language and, depending on their level of language training, as teachers themselves. Two Latin American universities, the Universidad de los Andes, Mérida, Venezuela, and the Universidad de Guanajuato, Mexico, provide several university places.

== Notable people ==
=== Alumni ===
- Benjamin Appl, lyric baritone
- May Ayim (1986), psychology and education
- Markus Brunnermeier (1993), economics
- Verena Brunschweiger, media personality and author
- Felix Brych (2004), public law
- Elli Erl (2005), sports and medicine
- Claudia Fischbach, pharmaceutical technology
- Wolfgang A. Herrmann (1973), chemistry
- Archbishop Ieronymos II of Athens (1978), theology
- Werner Jeanrond (1979), theology
- Stefan Laufer (1984), pharmacy
- Theophilos Kuriakose (2001), Bishop of Jacobite Syrian Christian Church
- Hans Joachim Schellnhuber (1980), theoretical physics, 1980
- Sarah Straub,(2011), singer, songwriter, and musician, 2011
- Edmund Stoiber (1971), criminal law
- Thomas F.A. Whitfield, scientist, inventor
- Michael Kalu Ukpong, Auxiliary Bishop of the Catholic Diocese of Roman Catholic Diocese of Umuahia

=== Faculty ===
- Pope Benedict XVI, theology
- Michael Dowling, innovation and technology management
- Udo Steiner, public law
- Karl Stetter, microbiology
- Wolfgang Wiegard, economics
- Otto S. Wolfbeis, chemistry

== See also ==
- List of universities in Germany
