= Vittoria Alliata di Villafranca =

Italian author, translator and aristocrat

Vittoria Alliata di Villafranca (born 23 January 1950) is an Italian author and translator. As a teenager, she produced the first translation of J. R. R. Tolkien's The Lord of the Rings into Italian. She later wrested control of the family's 100-room summer palace from Opus Dei and the Mafia, and had it renovated.

== Life and work ==
Vittoria Alliata di Villafranca was born in Geneva, Switzerland, on 23 January 1950. She is the daughter of Francesco Alliata di Villafranca (1919–2015) and a cousin of the writer Dacia Maraini.

As a teenager, Vittoria Alliata translated J. R. R. Tolkien's epic fantasy The Lord of the Rings into Italian as Il Signore degli Anelli, and the first volume of the trilogy, The Fellowship of the Ring, was published by Astrolabio in 1967. The two other volumes followed, and all were later published by Rusconi, and then Bompiani in 1970 after extensive revisions by Quirino Principe.

Vittoria Alliata did post-graduate studies in Lebanon in the late 1960s, but abandoned them in order to become acquainted with Arab and Muslim women of all social backgrounds. She travelled in the Middle East, including the Arabian Peninsula and Iran, for more than a decade, and her experiences resulted in the 1980 book Harem, which depicts the daily lives of Arab and Muslim women.

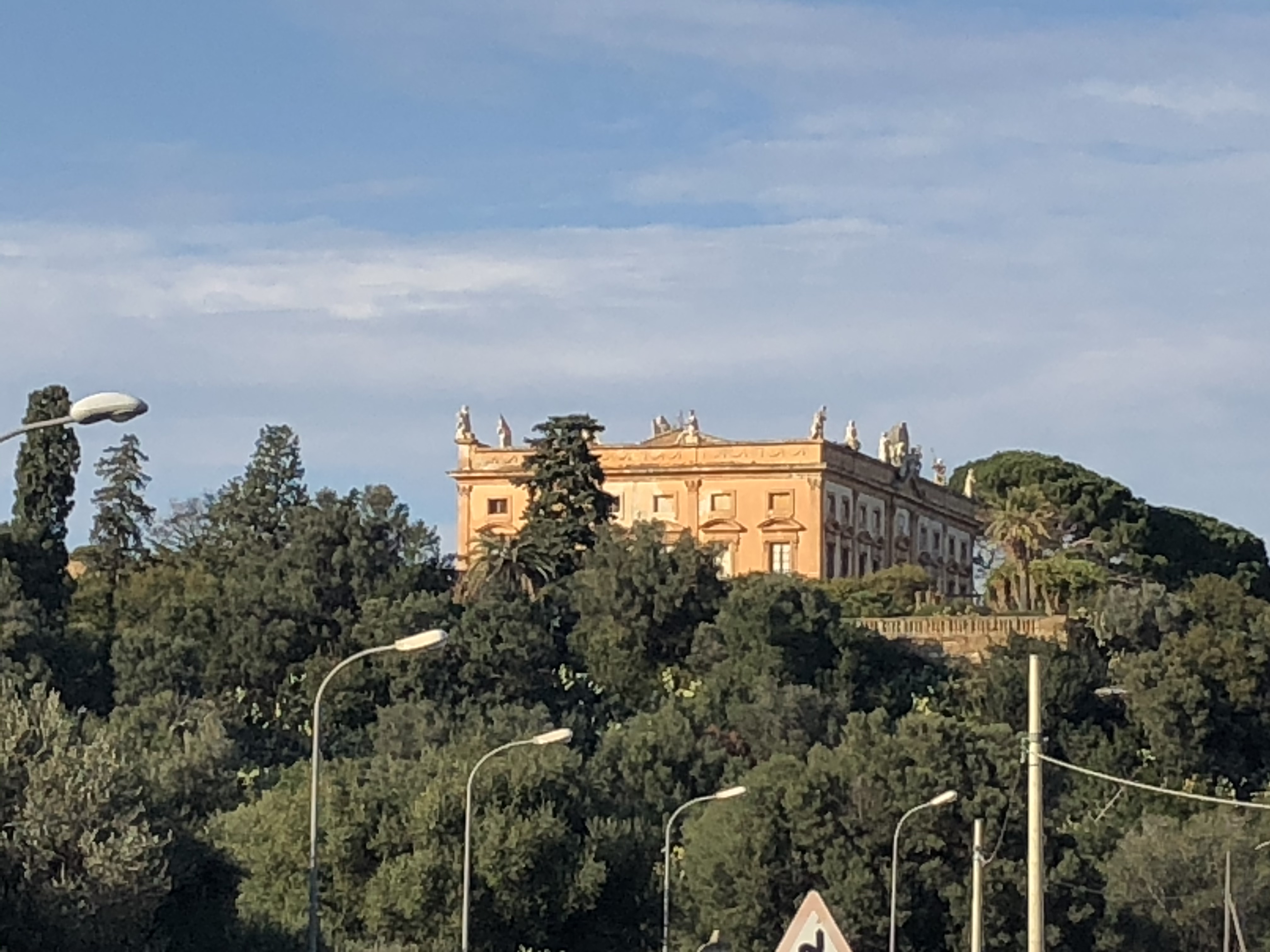
The Villa Valguarnera in 2020

When Vittoria Alliata returned to Sicily, she found cows and wild boar wandering about in the Villa Valguarnera, the family's 18th-century summer palace in Bagheria to the east of Palermo. She spent 20 years dealing with the local mafia and restoring its 100 rooms. Her aunt had died in 1988, leaving half of the ownership of the Villa Valguarnera to Opus Dei. The will was contested by the family, but while in probate, the mafia sequestered the building, installed a guardian, and were rumoured to have plans to open a casino. The building is now owned by Alliata.

As of 2017, the entire second floor of the Villa Valguarnera was available to rent including the services of a housekeeper and a cook.

In 2019, The Times reported that Vittoria Alliata was "at war" over a new Tolkien translation into Italian, and that her translation is "beloved of the far right".

Vittoria Alliata spoke at a conference in Moscow of the International Movement of Russophiles in March 2023, during the Russian invasion of Ukraine.

== Selected publications ==
- InDigest, il meglio dell'America per un mondo migliore, Edizioni La Pietra, 1975
- Harem, memorie d'Arabia di una nobildonna siciliana, Garzanti, 1980
- Baraka, dal Tamigi alle Piramidi, Mondadori, 1984
- Rajah, in Malesia alla ricerca dell'incenso perduto tra sultani, maghe e poeti, Garzanti, 1987
