= Internationale Politik =

Bimonthly German magazine

- Editor: Martin Bialecki
- Categories: International politics
- Frequency: Bimonthly
- Publisher: Wilhelm Cornides
- First issue: July 1946
- Country: Germany
- Based in: Berlin
- Website: http://www.internationalepolitik.de/
- ISSN: 1430-175X

Internationale Politik (IP; English: International Politics) is the magazine of the German Council on Foreign Relations (DGAP, Deutsche Gesellschaft für Auswärtige Politik). It covers contemporary topics in international affairs under editor-in-chief Martin Bialecki, who has held the position since September 2018.

== History and profile ==
The magazine was initially published as Europa-Archiv in July 1946 by DGAP founder Wilhelm Cornides a member of the Oldenbourg family, owners of R. Oldenbourg Verlag, a German publishing house started in 1858 by Rudolf Oldenbourg. It was renamed Internationale Politik in 1995. The magazine is based in Berlin. It has German, English, Russian, and Chinese editions.

An English edition, the Berlin Policy Journal, has been published since 2012 and is only available online. The topics deal with German and European politics, Russia, transatlantic relations, security issues and the German energy transition. As with the IP, Sylke Tempel was the editor-in-chief from 2008 to October 2017.

In 2002 the publisher was Bertelsmann Verlag. The Russian edition was launched in 1996 and is published every two months. The English edition (launched in 2000) and the Chinese edition (launched in 2005) are both quarterly. In 2009, the German edition changed from monthly to every two months. In 2020, a special edition of Internationale Politik was published as result of the Sylke Tempel Fellowship, a program initiated by the German-Israeli Future Forum Foundation.

== Development ==
The article "Then close your blouse!" by columnist Birgit Pommer (Volle Kelle) became the "Social Media Phenomenon of the Year" in 2013 due to its viral phenomenon spread on social networks.

The FAZ wrote in 2013: The online magazine "The European" successfully relies on targeted opinion journalism. The authors change constantly.

Since 2020 the IP Special, in which the fellows of the Constructor University for International tasks present their projects. Also in 2020, The European had the European Institute for Climate & Energy publish articles on the magazine's website without attribution of the author. The organization is not a scientific institute and rejects the scientific consensus on human-made climate change.

== See also ==
- List of magazines in Germany
