= National Register of Historic Places listings in Clermont County, Ohio =

Location of Clermont County in Ohio

This is a list of the National Register of Historic Places listings in Clermont County, Ohio.

This is intended to be a complete list of the properties and districts on the National Register of Historic Places in Clermont County, Ohio, United States. The locations of National Register properties and districts for which the latitude and longitude coordinates are included below, may be seen in a Google map.

There are 28 properties and districts listed on the National Register in the county. Another property was once listed but has been removed.

This National Park Service list is complete through NPS recent listings posted May 1, 2026.

== Current listings ==
	Name on the Register	Image	Date listed	Location	City or town	Description
1	Bethel Methodist Church	Bethel Methodist Church	August 11, 1978 (#78002020)	1 mi (1.6 km) north of Bantam on Elk Lick Rd. 39°00′26″N 84°08′18″W	Tate Township	
2	Bullskin Creek Site	Bullskin Creek Site	March 30, 1978 (#78002022)	On a terrace above Bullskin Creek, near its mouth at the Ohio River; 38°46′57″N 84°05′32″W	Franklin Township	
3	Clarke Farm Site		November 19, 1974 (#74001420)	Address Restricted	Monroe Township	Near Point Pleasant
4	Devanney Site		March 30, 1978 (#78002023)	West of Goshen	Goshen Township	
5	East Fork Site		March 30, 1978 (#78002021)	South of Batavia	Batavia Township	
6	Edgington Mound	Edgington Mound	July 15, 1974 (#74001415)	Southern side of U.S. Route 52, east of Neville; 38°48′16″N 84°11′24″W	Washington Township	
7	Elk Lick Road Mound	Elk Lick Road Mound	February 20, 1975 (#75001344)	Off Elk Lick Road, northwest of Bantam; 39°00′42″N 84°08′02″W	Batavia Township	
8	Aaron Fagin House	Aaron Fagin House	February 9, 2006 (#06000034)	2088 Lindale-Nicholsville Rd. 38°58′30″N 84°10′49″W	Monroe Township	
9	Ferris Site	Ferris Site	October 29, 1974 (#74001416)	On the banks of the Ohio River, 5 miles downstream from the William H. Zimmer Power Station; 38°56′26″N 84°16′16″W	Ohio Township	Near New Richmond
10	Gaskins-Malany House	Gaskins-Malany House	October 29, 1975 (#75001345)	726 Bradbury Rd., southwest of Withamsville; 39°02′N 84°17′W	Pierce Township	
11	Gatch Site	Gatch Site	October 15, 1974 (#74001414)	On the Gatch farm, off Gatch Avenue above the Little Miami River; 39°10′12″N 84°17′21″W	Milford	
12	U.S. Grant Birthplace and Grant Commemorative Sites Historic District	U.S. Grant Birthplace and Grant Commemorative Sites Historic District	August 6, 1998 (#98001013)	State Route 232 and U.S. Route 52, at Point Pleasant; 38°53′39″N 84°13′58″W	Monroe Township	
13	Grace Groesbeck House		February 23, 2015 (#15000037)	4949 Tealtown Rd. 39°07′50″N 84°15′10″W	Union Township	On the grounds of the Cincinnati Nature Center.
14	Harmony Hill Dairy House	Harmony Hill Dairy House	May 30, 2001 (#01000592)	299 S. 3rd St. 39°02′58″N 84°03′31″W	Williamsburg	
15	Krippendorf Estate	Krippendorf Estate	June 15, 2011 (#11000364)	4949 Tealtown Rd., southwest of Perintown; 39°07′31″N 84°14′51″W	Union Township	On the grounds of the Cincinnati Nature Center at Rowe Woods; main house is a circa 1899 Shingle-style building; other contributing structures include an ice house, a laundry/maid's quarters, a garage and a water tower
16	Lewis McKever Farmhouse	Lewis McKever Farmhouse	April 1, 1982 (#82003555)	4475 McKeever Rd., north of Williamsburg; 39°04′45″N 84°02′09″W	Williamsburg Township	
17	New Richmond Water Works and Electric Station	New Richmond Water Works and Electric Station	December 23, 1993 (#93001389)	701 Washington St. 38°56′43″N 84°16′37″W	New Richmond	Razed in 2012
18	Pfarr Log House	Pfarr Log House	September 16, 1977 (#77001048)	West of Owensville on Olive Branch-Stonelick Rd. 39°06′55″N 84°12′38″W	Union Township	Structure Missing as of 2012
19	Pleasant Hill	Pleasant Hill	February 28, 2008 (#08000112)	909 State Route 131; 39°10′37″N 84°15′37″W	Milford	
20	Promont	Promont	November 21, 1980 (#80002959)	906 Goshen Pike; 39°10′39″N 84°16′45″W	Milford	
21	Roas-Ilhardt Farm and Winery	Roas-Ilhardt Farm and Winery	September 16, 1982 (#82003553)	North of New Richmond at 3233 Cole Rd. 39°00′39″N 84°15′21″W	Pierce Township	
22	Ross-Gowdy House	Ross-Gowdy House	June 1, 1982 (#82003554)	125 George St. 38°56′58″N 84°16′54″W	New Richmond	
23	Salt House	Salt House	June 22, 1976 (#76001382)	Southwest of Bethel on State Route 222; 38°55′10″N 84°08′23″W	Tate Township	
24	Schafer House	Schafer House	May 13, 1974 (#74001417)	East of Neville off U.S. Route 52; 38°47′56″N 84°10′30″W	Washington Township	Likely razed in the early 1990s
25	Snead Mound		July 30, 1974 (#74001418)	Off U.S. Route 52	Neville	
26	Stonelick Covered Bridge	Stonelick Covered Bridge	September 10, 1974 (#74001419)	East of Perintown; 39°07′52″N 84°11′14″W	Stonelick Township	
27	Williams House	Williams House	June 26, 2002 (#02000704)	112 Gay St. 39°03′16″N 84°02′58″W	Williamsburg	
28	William Winter Stone House	William Winter Stone House	March 25, 1977 (#77001049)	North of Mt. Olive on State Route 133; 38°53′26″N 84°05′33″W	Tate Township	

== Former listing ==
	Name on the Register	Image	Date listed	Date removed	Location	City or town	Description
1	Pinkham Farm	Pinkham Farm	July 23, 1973 (#73001397)	September 22, 1983	Northwest of Bantam off State Route 125	Bantam	

== See also ==
- List of National Historic Landmarks in Ohio
- Listings in neighboring counties: Bracken (KY), Brown, Campbell (KY), Clinton, Hamilton, Pendleton (KY), Warren
- National Register of Historic Places listings in Ohio
