= Ohio State Route 749 =

State highway in Clermont County, Ohio, US

State Route 749

Route information
- Maintained by ODOT
- Length: 5.51 mi (8.87 km)
- Existed: 1937–present

Major junctions
- West end: US 52 in New Palestine
- East end: SR 132 / CR 72 in Lindale

Location
- Country: United States
- State: Ohio
- Counties: Clermont

Highway system
- Ohio State Highway System; Interstate; US; State; Scenic
← SR 748	→ SR 750

State Route 749 (SR 749) is an east–west state highway in the southwestern portion of the U.S. state of Ohio. Its western terminus is at a signalized intersection with US 52 in the hamlet of New Palestine, and its eastern terminus is at another signalized intersection, this time SR 132, in the unincorporated community of Lindale.

== Route description ==
The entirety of SR 749 is nestled within the confines of Clermont County. This state highway is not included as a part of the National Highway System.

== History ==
SR 749 was first designated in 1937 along the routing that it currently occupies in southwestern Clermont County. The highway has not experienced any major changes to its routing since its debut.

== Major intersections ==
The entire route is in Clermont County.

Location	mi	km	Destinations	Notes
Pierce Township	0.00	0.00	US 52 / Ten Mile Road – New Richmond, Cincinnati	
Ohio Township	5.51	8.87	SR 132 / CR 72 (Lindale-Nicholasville) – New Richmond, Batavia	
1.000 mi = 1.609 km; 1.000 km = 0.621 mi
