= William Doan =

American politician (1792–1847)

Member of the U.S. House of Representatives from Ohio's 5th district
- In office March 4, 1839 – March 3, 1843
- Preceded by: Thomas L. Hamer
- Succeeded by: Emery D. Potter

Personal details
- Born: April 4, 1792 District of Maine, Massachusetts, US
- Died: June 22, 1847 (aged 55) Withamsville, Ohio, US
- Resting place: Mount Moriah Cemetery, Tobasco, Ohio
- Party: Democratic

William Doan (April 4, 1792 – June 22, 1847) was a U.S. representative from Ohio for two terms from 1839 to 1843.

== Biography ==
Born in the District of Maine (then a part of the state of Massachusetts), Doan attended the common schools. He moved with his parents in 1812 to Ohio and settled near Lindale, Clermont County. He studied medicine at New Richmond and commenced practice in 1818 at Withamsville, Clermont County. He graduated from the Ohio Medical College at Cincinnati in 1827. He served as member of the State house of representatives in 1831 and 1832. He served in the State senate in 1833 and 1834.

=== Congress ===
Doan was elected as a Democrat to the Twenty-sixth and Twenty-seventh Congresses (March 4, 1839 – March 3, 1843). He was not a candidate for renomination in 1842. He resumed the practice of medicine.

=== Death ===
He died in Withamsville, Ohio, June 22, 1847. He was interred in Union Township (Mount Moriah) Cemetery, Tobasco, Ohio.

== Sources ==
- United States Congress. "William Doan (id: D000380)". Biographical Directory of the United States Congress.

Ohio House of Representatives
Preceded by Samuel Perrin; John Shaw	Representative from Clermont County; December 5, 1831-December 1, 1833	Succeeded by F. Dunning
Ohio Senate
Preceded by Thomas Morris	Senator from Clermont District; December 2, 1833-December 6, 1835	Succeeded by Samuel Medary
U.S. House of Representatives
Preceded by Thomas L. Hamer	United States Representative from Ohio's 5th congressional district March 4, 1839–March 3, 1843	Succeeded by Emery D. Potter
