= Gaskins-Malany House =

Historic house in Ohio, United States

Coordinates: 39.04146°N 84.29046°W

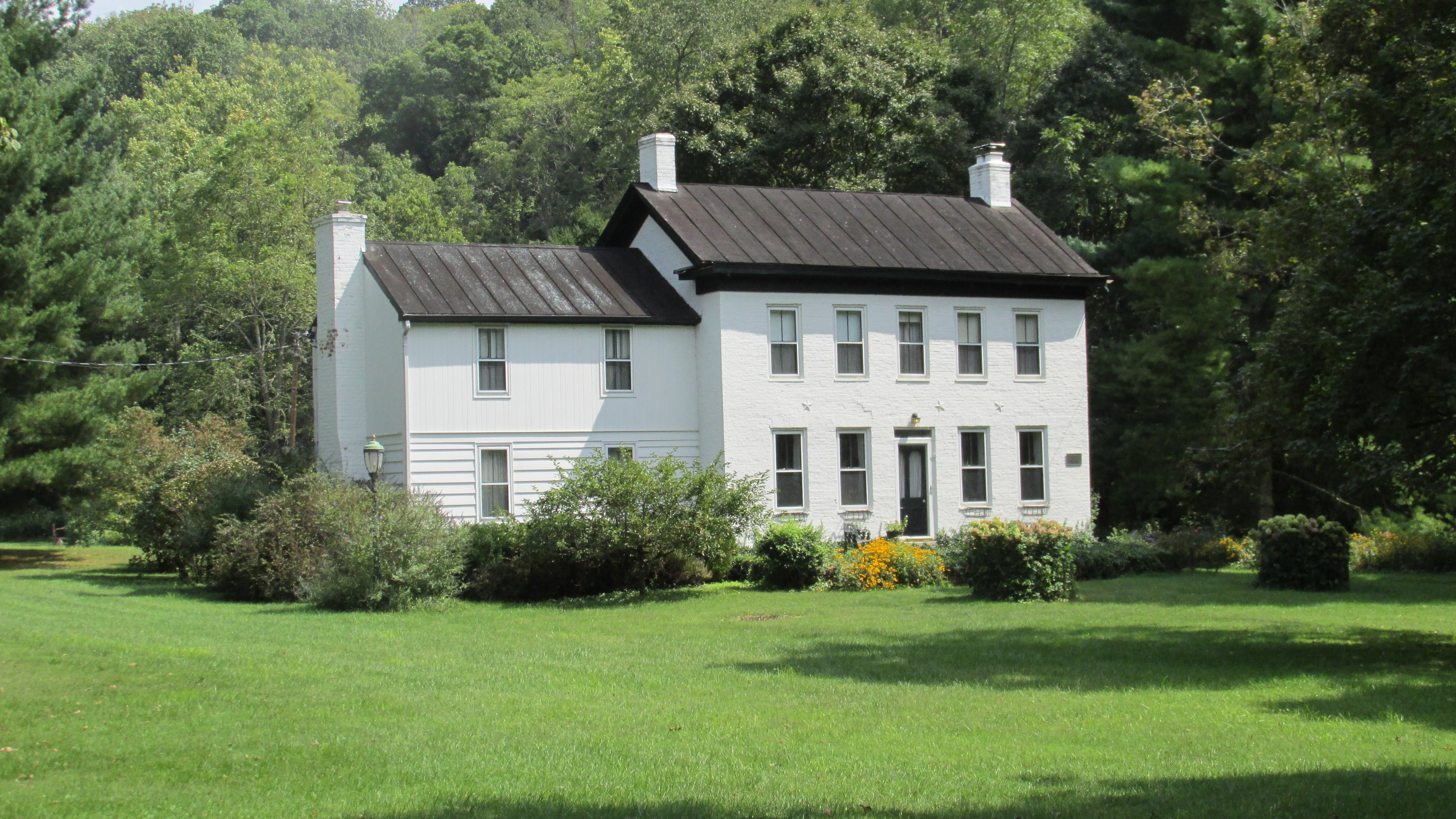
Front of the house

Gaskins-Malany House is a historic house in Withamsville, Ohio, United States. It was entered in the National Register of Historic Places by the National Park Service in 1975.

The house is located at 726 Bradbury Road, Locust Corner vicinity. The house, along with a summer kitchen, barn, smoke house and corn crib are nineteenth century rural buildings, representative of early agricultural practices in southwest Ohio.

The farmstead was originally part of the John Knox Survey, #4795. James Knox's grant #5056 was on “the waters of muddy creek” (Nine Mile), later part of Pierce Township. In 1827, John Gaskins purchased 57 acres including the Gaskins-Malany Farmstead property. He first built a one-room home with loft, adding in 1847 a front addition with two rooms down, and two rooms up. A small general store and saw mill existed on the site as well.

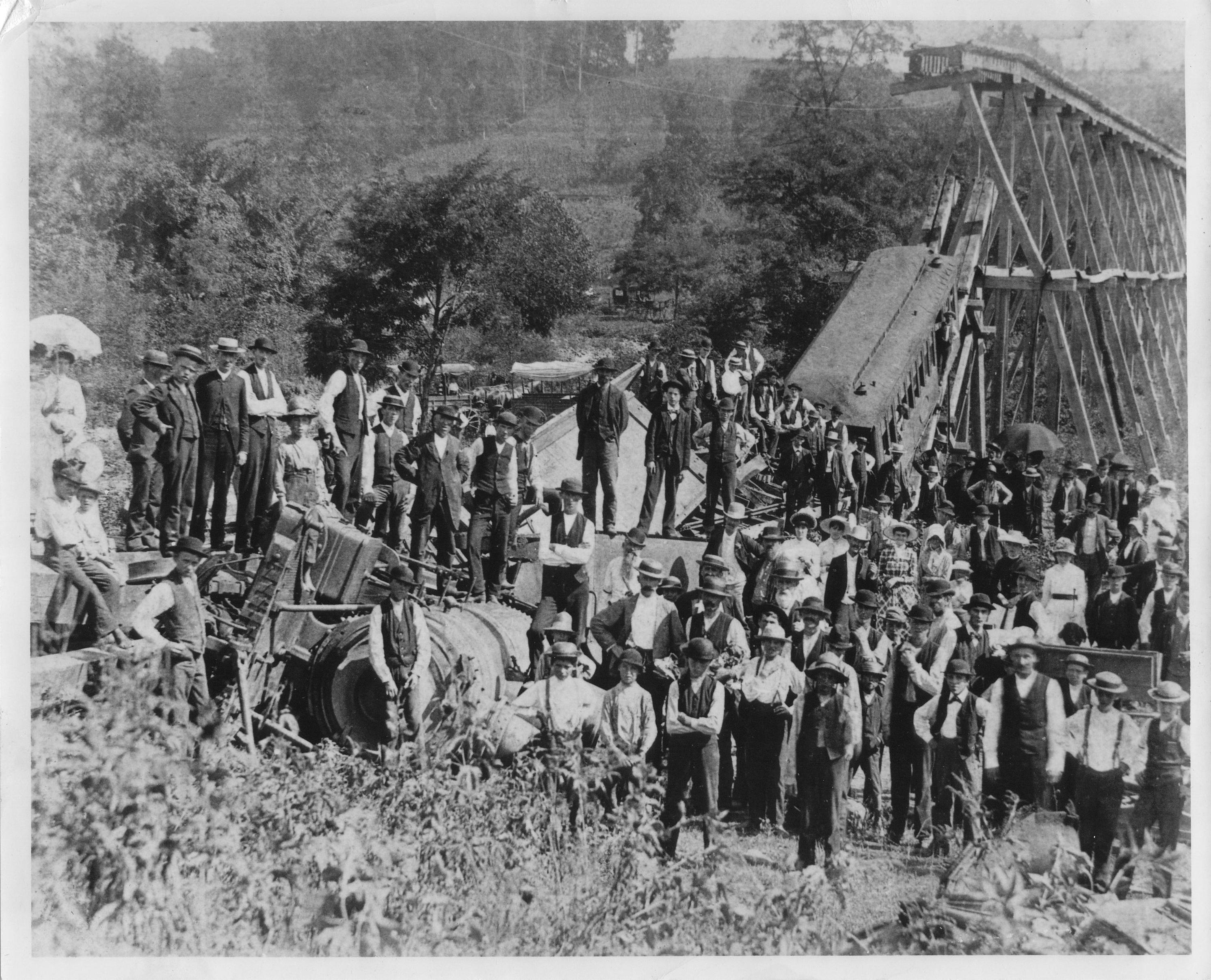
Cincinnati and Eastern Trestle Collapse August 8th 1885

On August 8th 1885, five years after a narrow gauge railroad connector between New Richmond and Newtown was built by the Cincinnati and Eastern Railway, a trestle collapse occurred in front of the Gaskin-Malany Farmstead (Three Forks). The trestle crossed the creeks connecting the hill to the northwest, where a station for Locust Corner passengers existed, to the hill to the south. The injured and dying were placed on the stone porch. The Cincinnati and Eastern Connector ceased operation after this.

In 1947, remodeling occurred inside the farmhouse, and in 1948 an additional wing was added. In 1955, the Malany family made it their home, placing it on the National Register of Historic Places in 1975.
