= Dravo Gravel Site =

Archaeological site of the Archaic period in Hamilton County, Ohio, United States

- U.S. National Register of Historic Places
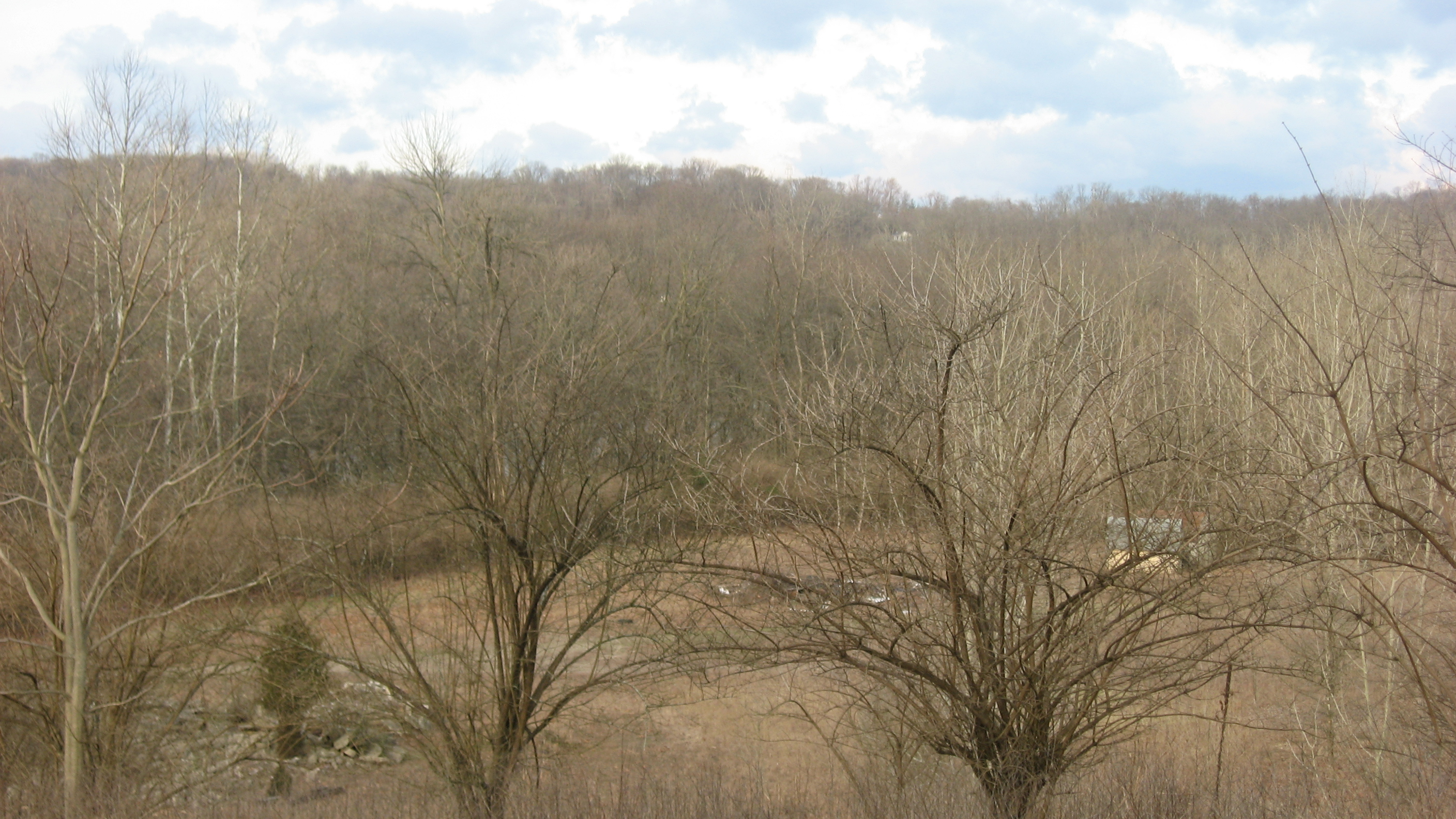
- Overview of the site
- Nearest city: Cleves, Ohio
- Area: 7 acres (2.8 ha)
- NRHP reference No.: 78002083
- Added to NRHP: December 22, 1978

The Dravo Gravel Site (33HA377) is an archaeological site located above the Great Miami River in Miami Township, Hamilton County, Ohio, United States. Discovered in the middle of a gravel pit, the site is a leading example of the local manifestation of the Archaic period.

The site lies atop a Miami River terrace outside the village of Cleves, occupying a soil location with a small layer of silty loam that covers a deep deposit of gravel. Contributing to the site's desirability for ancient occupation is a small stream, which inhabitants could have used as a source for water instead of climbing down to the riverside. The extensive deposit of gravel had prompted the Dravo Corporation to open a gravel pit before the site's discovery, and because of ongoing commercial operations, archaeologists conducted a salvage excavation and were unable to examine the large majority of the site. Their hurried excavation revealed groups of features, typically comprising cooking and trash pits, prompting the excavation team to suggest that each group of features had been used by a separate family. Observing that the trash pits had consistently been covered by soil after being dug, the excavators posited that the inhabitants had exhibited a sense of sanitation, burying garbage in pits rather than piling it on the ground, although evidence from later sites demonstrates that growing populations forced later generations to abandon the creation of trash pits in favor of building large middens on the ground.

Aside from these cuts and fills, findings at the site included burials and tools. Ten human bodies, ranging in age from a girl no older than seven to a woman in her late thirties, were found in various positions, and two canine burials distinguished Dravo from similar sites in the region. Some of the bodies had been buried with scrapers and other stone tools, while other bodies were placed with animal bones and teeth. Elsewhere at the site, many more stone tools were discovered, including implements such as axes, atlatl components, pestles, and celts.

Measuring approximately 2.3 hectares (5.7 acres) in area, the site's dating is dependent on the technological level of the inhabitants, as radiocarbon dating yielded results centering on the fifth century BC, radically later than those of similar sites in the region; typical of such sites, the dating for the Bullskin Creek Site is slightly more than two thousand years earlier than the results obtained at Dravo. The inhabitants' technology prompted their classification as a people of the middle of the Late Archaic Period.

In 1978, the Dravo site was listed on the National Register of Historic Places, qualifying because of its archaeological significance.
