= William Winter Stone House =

Historic house in Ohio, United States

- U.S. National Register of Historic Places
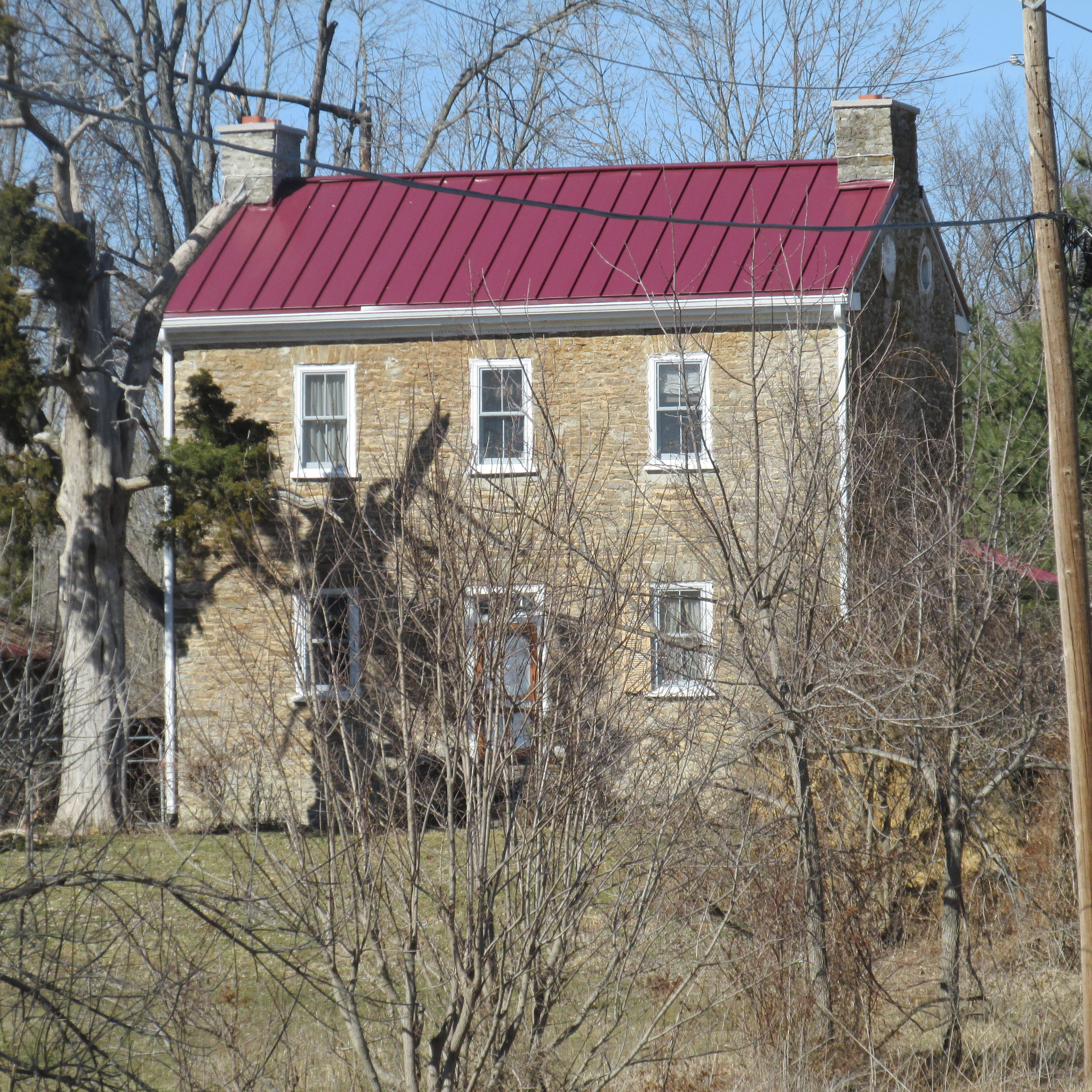
- Roadside view of the house

- Location within Ohio Location within the United States
- Location: State Route 133, Mount Olive, Ohio
- Coordinates: 38°53′26.5″N 84°5′32″W
- Area: 5 acres (2.0 ha)
- Built: 1803
- Architectural style: Federal
- NRHP reference No.: 77001049
- Added to NRHP: March 25, 1977

The William Winter Stone House is a historic residence in Clermont County, Ohio, United States. Constructed at the dawn of the nineteenth century (in 1803), it was home to some of the area's first settlers, and it has been named a historic site.

Born in Virginia, Mordecai Winters and his family moved to the Northwest Territory at the end of the eighteenth century, becoming established in Williamsburg by 1800. Mordecai was a revolutionary war veteran who also survived being scalped as an adult. The first resident of the house, William Winter, was Mordecai's son; both father and son lived together in the house following its completion. The house ceased to be used solely for residential purposes during the middle of the 20th century. From 1848 until 1880, the Mount Olive post office operated out of the kitchen, and a general store was run out of a back addition that was constructed circa 1850.

Despite its name, the William Winter Stone House is not completely built of stone; the two-story walls are composed of some stone sections and some brick, with a metal roof and elements of wood and stone. Chimneys sit atop the roofline at both ends of the house's gabled roof. The three-bay facade is pierced by five windows, in addition to a door with four-piece transom light in the center of the first story. In addition to the frame general store addition, the house employs wood for much of the interior; the original black walnut woodworking is still largely present. The overall design is largely typical of the Federal style of architecture.

In early 1977, the William Winter Stone House was listed on the National Register of Historic Places, qualifying both because of its architecture and because of its place as the home of a leading local citizen, William Winter. For much of its history, the house has been an informal landmark for locals, both because of its architecture and because of its significant commercial role in what was once a remote part of the county.
