= Pfarr Log House =

Historic house in Ohio, United States

- U.S. National Register of Historic Places
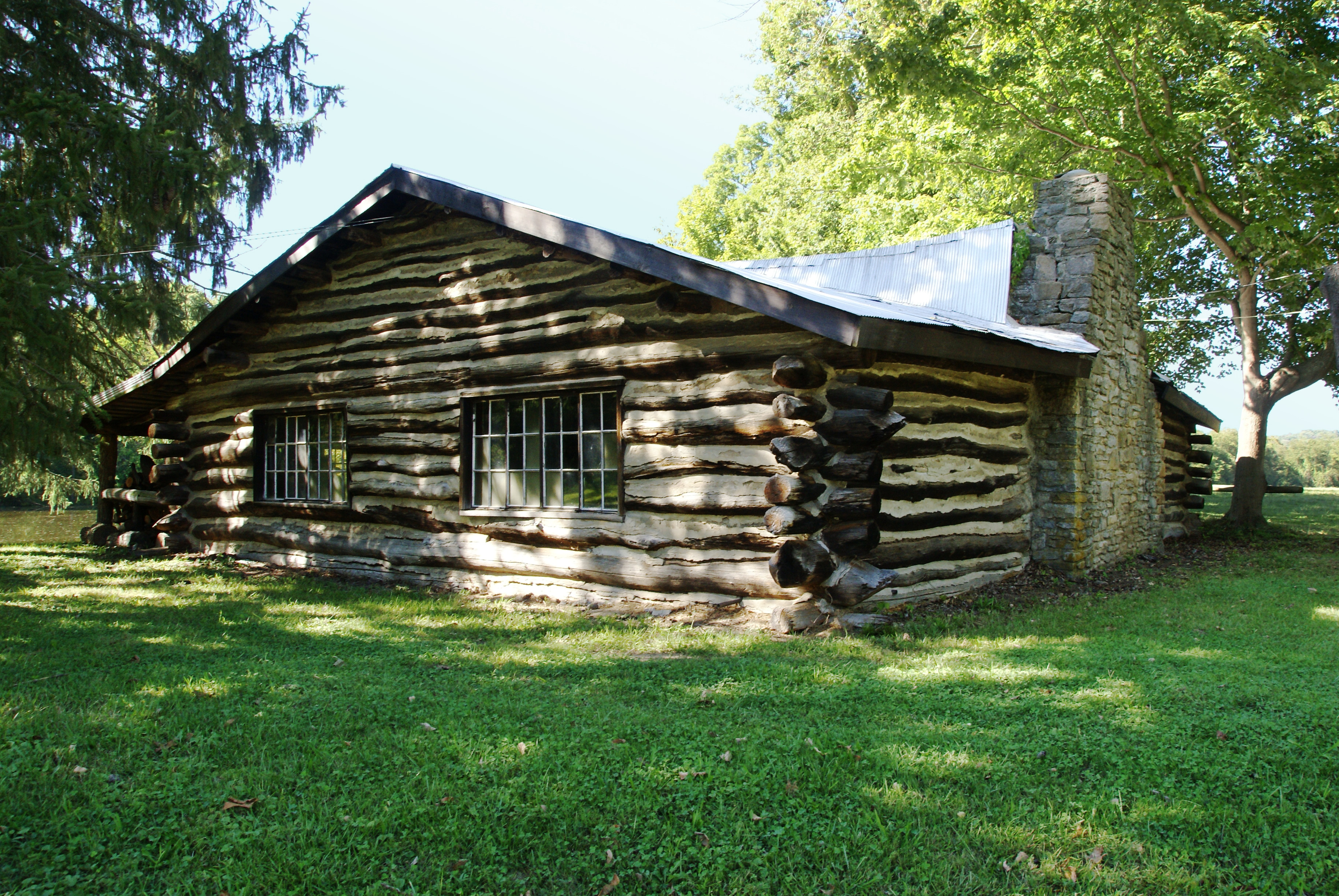
- Rear and side of the house

- Location within Ohio Location within the United States
- Location: S.E of Milford on Shayler run Rd, Milford, Ohio
- Coordinates: 39°6′29″N 84°13′36.6″W
- Area: Less than 1 acre (0.40 ha)
- Built: 1825
- Architectural style: Log cabin
- NRHP reference No.: 77001048
- Added to NRHP: September 16, 1977

The Pfarr Log House (also known locally as the Wiederhold Log Cabin after its final owner) was a log cabin located in an isolated valley near the village of Milford in rural Clermont County, Ohio, United States. Built in the early nineteenth century, it provided a pivotal representation of the area's earliest built environment, and it has been named a historic site. This cabin was known primarily as a property of the Pfarr family because it was purchased by George Pfarr in late 1840 as part of a 21-acre homestead, and it remained in the Pfarr family until it was sold to Jim Wiederhold in 1976. George, a butcher and farmer, immigrated from Bavaria with his wife and three children, and the property was actively farmed until the 1960s by his children and grandchildren. Current status unknown, but it is no longer standing in its original location next to Shayler Run creek. (Picture and pinned location are incorrect. See below.)

Although primarily a log building, the house rests on a stone foundation; the roof is metal, constructed with a very shallow pitch from the edge to the peaks of the gables. The structure is one and a half stories tall with walls built of square-cut timbers, rather than unhewn logs. The joints between the timbers feature a construction method known as "steeple notching", which was often employed in buildings constructed before 1825.

Comparatively little is known of the house's early history before the terminus ante quem of construction, 1825; a precise date of construction has not been established, and the builder's name is similarly unknown. A newer farmhouse was built next to the cabin in the early 1900s, and when the Pfarrs expanded this newer residence, the cabin was moved in 1910 to make room.

In September 1977, the Pfarr Log House was listed on the National Register of Historic Places; despite having been moved in 1910, it qualified because of its historically significant architecture.

2022-06-28 Correction to the picture and google pin information: the Pfarr Log House is on the National registry but the picture and google pin currently on this post is not accurate. the log cabin on Olive Branch Stonelick Rd is a completely unrelated structure built by Mr. Damn as part of his pay lake in the early 1930's from logs harvested from the surrounding property.

2023-12-11 Further corrections and information: The Pfarr Log House was actually located at approximately 39.10808608543079, -84.22685352963514 on the banks of Shayler Run creek. However, the Pfarr Log House is no longer standing at or near this location and may have been destroyed. Locals say that some or all of the structure might have been saved and moved to another location in pieces. At this time the fate of the log house is unknown.

In the early 21st century the land that the cabin stood on was transferred out of Mr. Wiederhold's ownership due to public works project (possibly for water quality remediation on Shayler Run according to local residents), and all existing structures on the land were demolished during that project. According to John Pfarr, a descendant of George Pfarr and a friend to Jim Wiederhold, the cabin was sold to a local businessman in 2007. The man then dismantled it and moved it to his property near Milford.

During its existence this log home could not be seen from any public roadway due to its remote location. The log home could only be reached either by long gravel drive paralleling Shayler Run creek that begins where Baldwin Road crosses Shayler Run or by a steep gravel track going down into the creek valley from Taylor Walk off of Olive Branch-Stonelick Rd. This is why, when a photographer for a Wiki monuments project went looking for the Pfarr Log House, they could not find it and ended up mistakenly taking a photo of a nearby 1930's log structure made for an old pay lake. It was the only log structure that could be seen from a roadway in the area, and thus was assumed in error to be the Pfarr Log House by that photographer.

The cabin's former location is now off limits due to municipal works in the area, and all of the historic structures have been destroyed. However in satellite images it is still possible to see (in 2023) the gravel drive cutting through the small clearing next to the Shayler Run where the cabin had stood since at least 1825.

Coordinates when still standing were 39.10808608543079, -84.22685352963514

The Pfarr Log House looked nothing like the more modern 1930's log cabin currently used for this article. The second paragraph of this article provides a more accurate description (1.5 stories with square hewn logs constructed using steeple notching).
