= Lauder William Jones =

American chemist

Lauder William Jones (July 22, 1869 – December 28, 1960) was an American chemist, born at New Richmond, Ohio. He was graduated at Williams College in 1892, and received his Ph.D. from the University of Chicago in 1897. In the same year, he became an assistant in chemistry at Chicago, where he remained until 1907. From 1907 to 1918, he was professor of chemistry at the University of Cincinnati, and from 1918 to 1920, he was dean of the school of chemistry at the University of Minnesota, after which he accepted a call to the chair of chemistry at Princeton. He devoted his attention chiefly to organic chemistry and published papers on nitro-paraffin salts, alkyl derivatives of hydroxylamine, preparation of hydroxamic acids from hydroxylamines, electron conception of valence, and preparation of electromeres. During the War he served with the Chemical War Service as its chief of the research section of offense. Dr. Jones was the author of A Laboratory Outline of Organic Chemistry (1911). He died in Los Angeles, California in 1960.
