= Edgar R. Aston =

US Army Medal of Honor recipient (1847–1932)

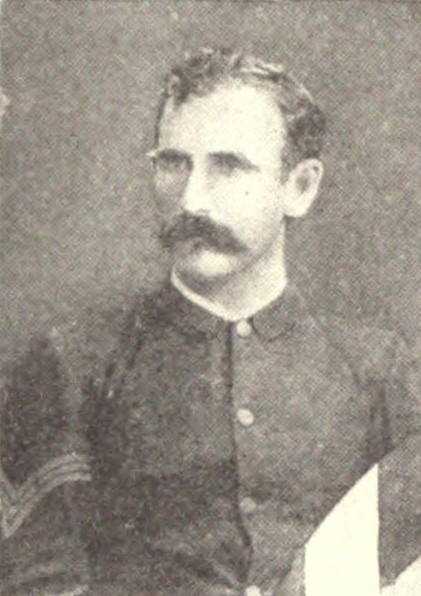
- Born: 1847; New Richmond, Ohio, United States
- Died: April 14, 1932 (aged 84–85); Cincinnati, Ohio
- Burial place: Tate Township Cemetery, Bethel, Ohio
- Military career
- Allegiance: United States of America; Union
- Branch: United States Army; Union Army
- Service years: 1864–1893
- Rank: Private
- Unit: 8th U.S. Cavalry
- Conflicts: American Civil War; Indian Wars
- Awards: Medal of Honor

Edgar R. Aston (1847 – April 14, 1932) was a soldier in the U.S. Army who served with the 8th U.S. Cavalry during the Apache Wars against Cochise. He was one of two men, along with Pvt. William Cubberly, who received the Medal of Honor for finding a passageway for an army column trapped in a 4,000-foot valley, and later defending his party against an Apache attack, at San Carlos, Arizona on May 30, 1868.

== Biography ==
Edgar R. Aston was born in New Richmond, Ohio in 1847. At age 16 during the Civil War, he enlisted as a private in Company C, 153rd Ohio Infantry, a 100 days service regiment, and served from May to September 1864. After the war's end, he remained with the U.S. Army and was posted on frontier duty. During the Apache Wars against Cochise, he was a member of the 8th U.S. Cavalry and was commended for distinguished service throughout the campaign.

On May 30, 1868, Aston and two other men volunteered to search out a wagon passage when an infantry column found themselves trapped in a 4,000-foot valley at San Carlos, Arizona. The three men passed through six miles of hostile Apache terrain before finding a suitable passageway out of the valley. On their return to the column, they successfully defended themselves against an Apache attack. For his actions, Aston received the Medal of Honor. He remained a career soldier for 30 years until retiring with pension in 1893. After a long illness, he died in Cincinnati, Ohio on April 14, 1932, at the age of 85. He was buried at the Tate Township Cemetery.

== Medal of Honor citation ==
Rank and organization: Private, Company L, 8th U.S. Cavalry. Place and date: At San Carlos, Ariz., May 30, 1868. Entered service at: ------. Birth: Clermont County, Ohio. Date of issue: July 28, 1868.

Citation:

With 2 other men he volunteered to search for a wagon passage out of a 4,000-foot valley wherein an infantry column was immobile. This small group passed 6 miles among hostile Apache terrain finding the sought passage. On their return trip down the canyon they were attacked by Apaches who were successfully held at bay.

== See also ==
- List of Medal of Honor recipients for the Indian Wars
