= Ruth Cranston =

American novelist

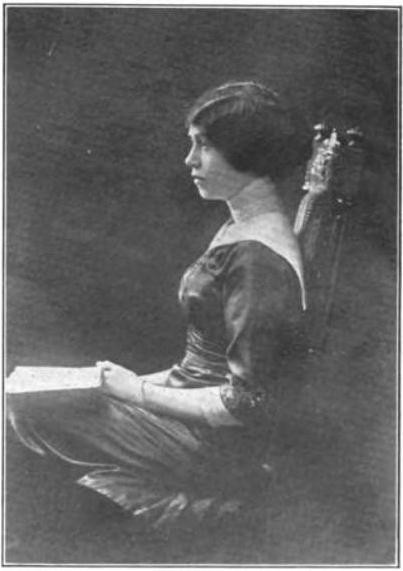
- Photograph of Cranston as "Anne Warwick" in April 1911 issue of The Bookman
- Born: November 14, 1887; Cincinnati, Ohio
- Died: April 2, 1956 (aged 68); New York City
- Occupation: Writer
- Parent(s): Earl Cranston and Laura A. (Martin) Cranston

Ruth Cranston (pseudonym, Anne Warwick; November 14, 1887 – April 2, 1956) was an American author and lecturer on religion and other subjects.

== Biography ==
A daughter of Methodist Bishop Earl Cranston, Ruth Cranston was born in Cincinnati, Ohio. She was taught by tutors in France and Switzerland, and traveled frequently with her family on her father's missionary work. She returned to the United States for college, and graduated from Goucher College in 1908. While in college she wrote three articles on what women can do after graduation, which were published in The Delineator. She then went to travel abroad, first to Vienna, where she penned some articles for American publications.

Turning to writing novels, she proceeded to publish a number of novels under the pseudonym "Anne Warwick", including seven novels by 1915. Her first novel, Compensation (1911), caused a stir in Washington, D.C. social circles. She married William Bleecher Newlin in London in July 1911. Her last Warwick book was published in 1918.

Cranston returned to the United States in 1919, after working for close to a year with the Red Cross, and by this time apparently divorced. She later worked in Geneva for ten years promoting international cooperation movements.

Her books published under her own name, which came in her later years, focused on non-fiction and religious subjects, including a biography of Woodrow Wilson (Cranston had gone to college to Wilson's daughters), a history of major religions (World Faith), and The Miracle of Lourdes (1955) about the Our Lady of Lourdes shrine.

She lived in Sierra Madre, California in her later years, and died at St. Luke's Hospital on April 2, 1956, while on a lecture tour. Her New York Times obituary did not mention her early writings as Anne Warwick.

The Miracle of Lourdes was last reissued, in an expanded version, in 1988.

== Selected bibliography ==
- The League That Did Not Fail (1944)
- The Story of Woodrow Wilson (1945)
- World Faith: The Story of the Religions of the United Nations (1946)
- What We All Believe (1951)
- The Miracle of Lourdes (1955)

=== As "Anne Warwick" ===
- Compensation (1911)
- Mastering Flame (1911) (first published anonymously)
- The Unknown Woman (1912)
- Inside Out (Nov 4, 1912 Ainslee's Magazine)
- Ashes of Incense (1912) (first published anonymously)
- The Meccas of the World (1913) (Title in England: My Cosmopolitan Year, published anonymously)
- Victory Law (1914)
- The Chalk Line (1915)
- The Unpretenders (1916)
- The Best People (1918)
