= Earl Cranston =

American bishop (1840–1932)

Bishop Earl Cranston
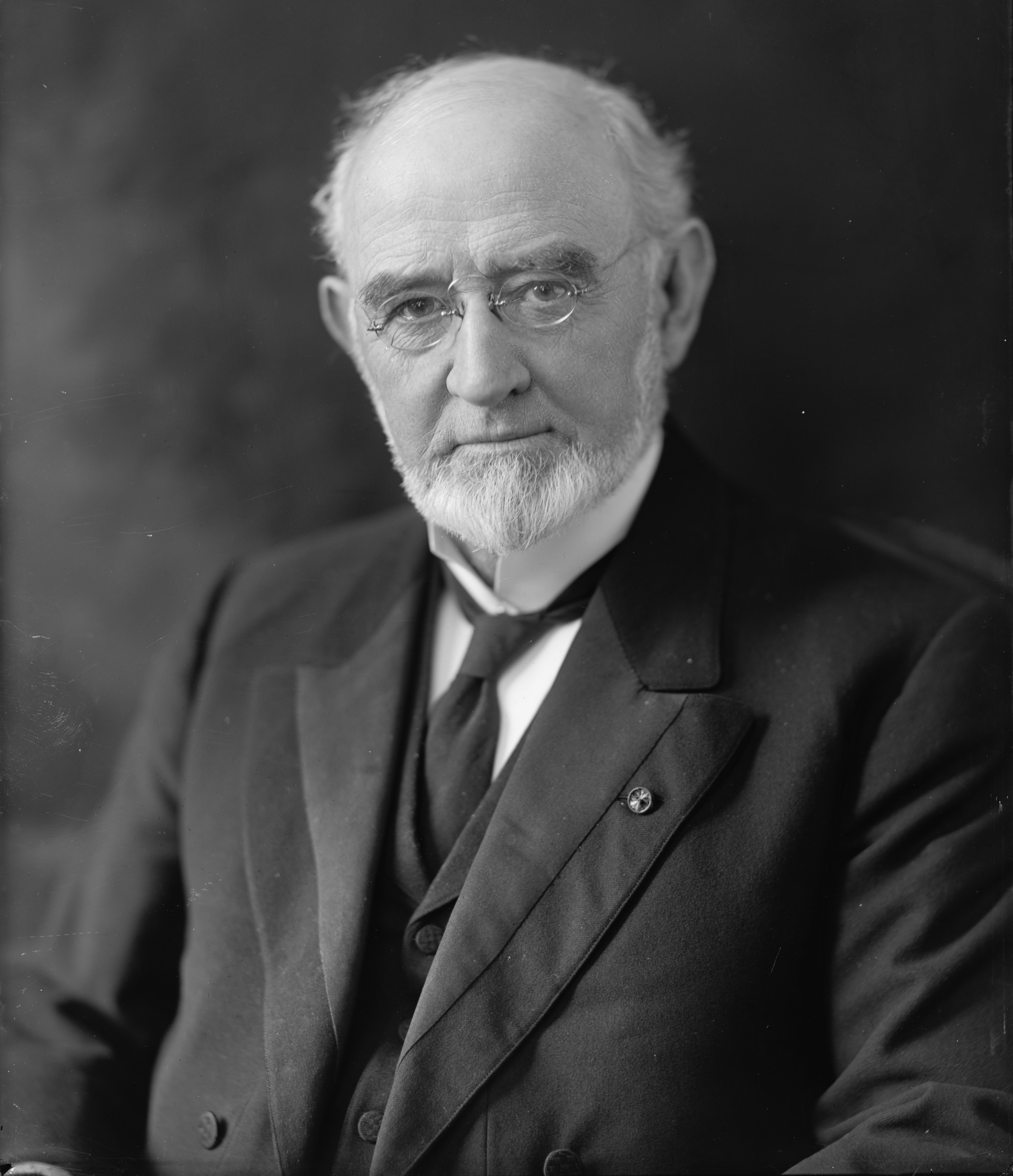
- Title: Bishop

Personal life
- Born: June 27, 1840 Athens, Ohio
- Died: August 18, 1932 (aged 92) New Richmond, Ohio
- Resting place: Arlington National Cemetery; 38.878308°N 77.068709°W

Religious life
- Religion: Methodist

Senior posting
- Based in: Washington, D.C.

Earl Cranston (June 27, 1840 – August 18, 1932) was an American bishop of the Methodist Episcopal Church, elected in 1896. He also distinguished himself as a Methodist pastor and presiding elder, and as an editor and publisher of the M.E. Church.

== Birth and family ==
Earl was born in Athens, Ohio, the third bishop of the Methodist Church to have been born in Athens. Earl was said to have a vigorous body squarely built and above the average height for that day (mid-19th century). Among his ancestors were Roger Williams and John and Samuel Cranston, both colonial governors of Rhode Island. Earl was the son of Earl and Jane E. (née Montgomery) Cranston. Earl Jr married Martha A. Behan in 1861. She died April 7, 1872. He then married Laura A. Martin, who died February 3, 1903. He then married Lucie M. Parker. Earl was the father of Earl M., Grace, James B., Dora, Ethel, Laura Alden, and Ruth (who became a well-known writer and lecturer).

== Education and Christian conversion ==
Cranston graduated High School in Jackson, Ohio. He earned the A.B. degree (with honor) in 1861 and the A.M. degree in 1865, both from Ohio University. The Rev. Solomon Howard, D.D., LL.D., was the president of O.U. at the time. Cranston was a member of Beta Theta Pi fraternity.

The Rev. William Taylor, (later Missionary Bishop of Africa) visited Athens during Earl's college years. Taylor held revival services, in which many students, including Earl, were converted to Christ.

== Military service and business career ==
Cranston entered the Union Army during the American Civil War as a private. He progressed through the ranks, first as a first sergeant, then as a commissioned officer, as a first lieutenant, adjutant and finally as a captain. He left the U.S. Army in 1864.

Following his military service, Earl studied for business, and was engaged in commercial affairs until 1867, when he entered the ministry.

== Ordained ministry and the founding of University of Denver ==
Cranston was admitted as a minister to the Ohio Annual Conference of the M.E. Church in 1867. He served the following appointments as pastor: Portsmouth, 1867–69; and Columbus, 1869-70. He then was transferred to the Minnesota Conference, where he served Winona, 1870-71. He transferred again, to the Illinois Conference, where he served Jacksonville, 1871-74. He transferred again, to the Indiana Conference, where he was appointed to Evansville, 1874-75. He then transferred to the Cincinnati Conference, where he was appointed pastor in Cincinnati, Ohio, 1875-78.

In 1878, Cranston was appointed pastor in Denver, Colorado, a change necessitated by the health of his family. While in Denver, Cranston took a prominent part in the movement to create and establish the University of Denver. He served both as secretary of the board of trustees, and as chairman of the finance committee. He also spent time as a member of the faculty.

In 1880, Cranston was appointed presiding elder of the Southern District of the Colorado Conference, serving until 1884. During this time he covered a territory of 70,000 square miles (180,000 km^{2}), requiring as much as 11,000 miles (18,000 km) of travel each year.

== Publishing agent ==
The 1884 General Conference of the M.E. Church elected Cranston publishing agent for the Western Book Concern, headquartered in Cincinnati. The Western Book Concern included offices in Chicago, St. Louis and on the Pacific coast. During this time he resided at Avondale, Cincinnati. He held this position until 1896.

Cranston was a member of M.E. General Conferences from 1884 until 1896.

== Honorary degrees ==
Cranston was made an honorary Doctor of Divinity in 1884 by Allegheny College. He was similarly honored by Cornell College in Iowa (D.D., 1884). His alma mater, Ohio University, awarded the LL.D. in 1896.

== Episcopal ministry ==
Cranston was elected bishop by the 1896 M.E. General Conference. As bishop he traveled widely throughout his denomination. His residence was Washington, D.C.

Cranston also served as a trustee of various institutions of higher education, including Ohio University (1896), The University of Puget Sound (1897-04), Willamette University (1897–1904), Goucher College (1905–16) and Morgan College (1912–16). He was also a member of the Fourth Ecumenical Methodist Conference, Toronto, 1911.

Cranston was a member of the Grand Army of the Republic and of the Military Order of the Loyal Legion of the United States. He also was a Mason.

== Death and burial ==
Cranston died at New Richmond, Ohio. He is buried in Arlington National Cemetery in Virginia.

== Selected writings ==
- Breaking Down the Walls, The Methodist Book Concern, 1915.

== See also ==
- List of bishops of the United Methodist Church
