= Todd Benzinger =

American baseball player (1963–2026)

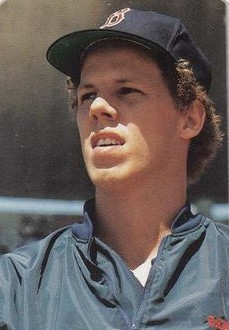
- Benzinger in 1986
- First baseman / Outfielder
- Born: February 11, 1963; Dayton, Kentucky, U.S.
- Died: October 21, 2026 (aged 63); West Chester Township, Ohio, U.S.
- Batted: Switch Threw: Right

MLB debut
- June 21, 1987, for the Boston Red Sox

Last MLB appearance
- May 14, 1995, for the San Francisco Giants

MLB statistics
- Batting average: .257
- Home runs: 66
- Runs batted in: 376
- Stats at Baseball Reference

Teams
- Boston Red Sox (1987–1988); Cincinnati Reds (1989–1991); Kansas City Royals (1991); Los Angeles Dodgers (1992); San Francisco Giants (1993–1995)

Career highlights and awards
- World Series champion (1990)

Todd Eric Benzinger (February 11, 1963 – October 21, 2026) was an American professional baseball first baseman and outfielder who had a nine-year Major League Baseball (MLB) career from 1987 to 1995.

== Biography ==
Benzinger was born in Dayton, Kentucky, and was a graduate of New Richmond High School in New Richmond, Ohio. Benzinger started his MLB career with the Boston Red Sox in 1987. He later played for the Cincinnati Reds, Kansas City Royals, Los Angeles Dodgers, and the San Francisco Giants. Benzinger ended his professional playing career in 1995 after playing with the Columbus Clippers, then a minor league affiliate of the New York Yankees. He played the majority of his career at the first baseman position, although he did occasionally play the outfield.

As a member of the Red Sox, Benzinger is legendary for his clutch hitting during the Sox' 1988 "Morgan Magic" run, particularly his 10th inning walk-off HR on July 20, 1988. This has been called "The Benzinger Game" by some Red Sox enthusiasts. Benzinger ended Orel Hershiser's scoreless streak at 59 innings on an RBI hit in the first inning of Hershiser's first start of 1989.

Benzinger joined the Cincinnati Reds in 1989 and led the National League in at bats with 628. Benzinger was a member of the 1990 World Series winning Reds which saw Cincinnati sweep the much favored Oakland A's in four games. Benzinger caught the last out in the 9th inning of Game 4 to clinch the series for the Reds.

From 2006 to 2008, Benzinger coached the girls' basketball team at Loveland High School in Loveland, Ohio. He managed the Dayton Dragons for the 2009 and 2010 seasons.

== Death ==
Todd Benzinger died on October 21, 2026, at the age of 63.

== Family ==
His son, Grant Benzinger, played for the 2017–18 Wright State Raiders men's basketball team. During the Horizon League Tournament, Grant earned MVP honors and helped the Raiders secure the conference title and an automatic bid to the NCAA Tournament.
