= 153rd Ohio Infantry Regiment =

- Active: May 10, 1864, to September 9, 1864
- Country: United States
- Allegiance: Union
- Branch: Infantry

The 153rd Ohio Infantry Regiment, sometimes 153rd Ohio Volunteer Infantry (or 153rd OVI) was an infantry regiment in the Union Army during the American Civil War.

== Service ==
The 153rd Ohio Infantry was organized at Camp Dennison near Cincinnati, Ohio, and mustered on May 10, 1864, for 100 days service under the command of Colonel Israel Stough.

The regiment left Ohio for Harpers Ferry, West Virginia, May 10 and was attached to Railroad Guard, Reserve Division, Department of West Virginia. Served guard duty at Harpers Ferry and along the line of the Baltimore & Ohio Railroad until June 29. Action at Hammack's Mills, Oldtown, July 3. North Mountain July 3. South Branch Bridge and Patterson's Creek Bridge July 4. Sir John's Run July 6. Green Springs Run August 2. Moved to Camp Chase, Columbus, Ohio, August 30.

The 153rd Ohio Infantry mustered out of service September 9, 1864, at Camp Chase.

== Ohio National Guard ==
Over 35,000 Ohio National Guardsmen were federalized and organized into regiments for 100 days service in May 1864. Shipped to the Eastern Theater, they were designed to be placed in "safe" rear areas to protect railroads and supply points, thereby freeing regular troops for Lt. Gen. Ulysses S. Grant’s push on the Confederate capital of Richmond, Virginia. As events transpired, many units found themselves in combat, stationed in the path of Confederate Gen. Jubal Early’s veteran Army of the Valley during its famed Valley Campaigns of 1864. Ohio Guard units met the battle-tested foe head on and helped blunt the Confederate offensive thereby saving Washington, D.C. from capture. Ohio National Guard units participated in the battles of Monacacy, Fort Stevens, Harpers Ferry, and in the siege of Petersburg.

The 153rd OVI was formed from the 41st regiment of the Ohio National Guard along with two companies from the 35th regiment of the Ohio National Guard.

== Casualties ==
The regiment lost 29 men during service; 1 officer and 2 enlisted men killed or mortally wounded, 26 enlisted men died due to disease.

== Commanders ==
- Colonel Israel Stough

== Notable members ==
- Private Edgar R. Aston, Company C - Medal of Honor recipient for action at San Carlos, Arizona Territory, May 30, 1868, while serving with the 8th U.S. Cavalry
- Sergeant Major Nehemiah Green - fourth governor of Kansas, November 1868-January 1869

== See also ==
- List of Ohio Civil War units
- Ohio in the Civil War
