= New Richmond High School =

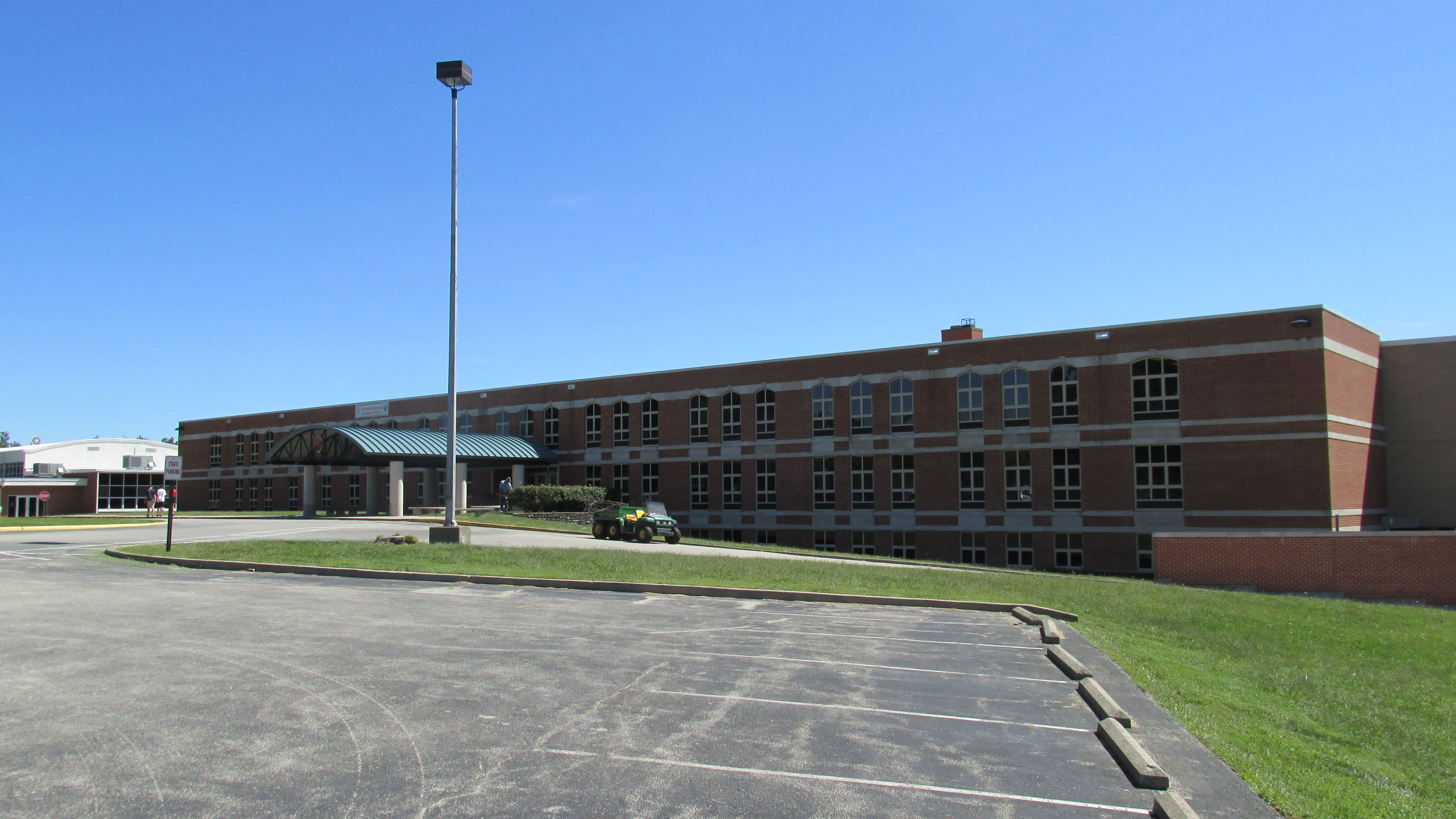

Location
- 1131 Bethel-New Richmond Road; New Richmond, Ohio 45157; United States; 38°57′13″N 84°16′09″W

Information
- Other name: NRHS
- Type: Public high school
- School district: New Richmond Exempted Village School District
- NCES School ID: 390455502276
- Principal: Lawrence Kozlowski
- Teaching staff: 32.85 (on an FTE basis)
- Grades: 9–12
- Enrollment: 587 (2023–2024)
- Student to teacher ratio: 17.87
- Colors: Red and black
- Athletics conference: Southern Buckeye Athletic/Academic Conference
- Nickname: Lions
- Website: www.nrschools.org

New Richmond High School (NRHS) is a public high school in New Richmond, Ohio, United States. It is part of the New Richmond Exempted Village School District.

== History ==
Two nearby townships wished to be combined with the New Richmond Exempted School District (NREVSD) in the late fifties. Pierce Township School became part of the New Richmond Exempted Village School District in 1955.

New Richmond Elementary (NRE) was dedicated on May 18, 1958. Later, in 1965 the New Richmond High School (NRHS) was erected next door to NRE.

Until 1980 the administrative offices were housed in the Market Street building. They relocated to the Middle School and in 1983, the building was sold for $80,100. For the next seven years, the building remained vacant and was left to deteriorate. In 1990, the board repurchased the building at the original sale price of $80,100. Extensive renovations and repairs were made, and the building was once again used for public purposes.

The Market Street building was rededicated on August 27, 1995. The total cost of the repairs and remodeling was $2,500,000. It now serves as a community resource center. This building houses the NREVSD administrative offices, the New Richmond High School Graduation Academy, and the Boys and Girls Club of New Richmond.

In 1997, a new elementary school was built to replace the Pierce Elementary building. This new school, Locust Corner Elementary, was located behind Pierce Elementary, which has since been demolished. Monroe Elementary and New Richmond Elementary underwent major renovations as well. The students and staff at Monroe Elementary spent one school year, 1994–1995, in mobile classrooms during construction.

== Notable alumni ==
- Todd Benzinger, MLB player
- Dwayne Woodruff, judge and former NFL player
