= Mount Olive, Ohio =

Unincorporated community in Ohio, U.S.

Coordinates: 38°53′12″N 84°5′32″W

Mount Olive is an unincorporated community in Clermont County, Ohio, United States.

== History ==
A post office called Mount Olive was established in 1848, and remained in operation until 1907. Besides the post office, Mount Olive had a country store.
