= Ferris Site =

Archaeological site in Ohio, United States

- U.S. National Register of Historic Places
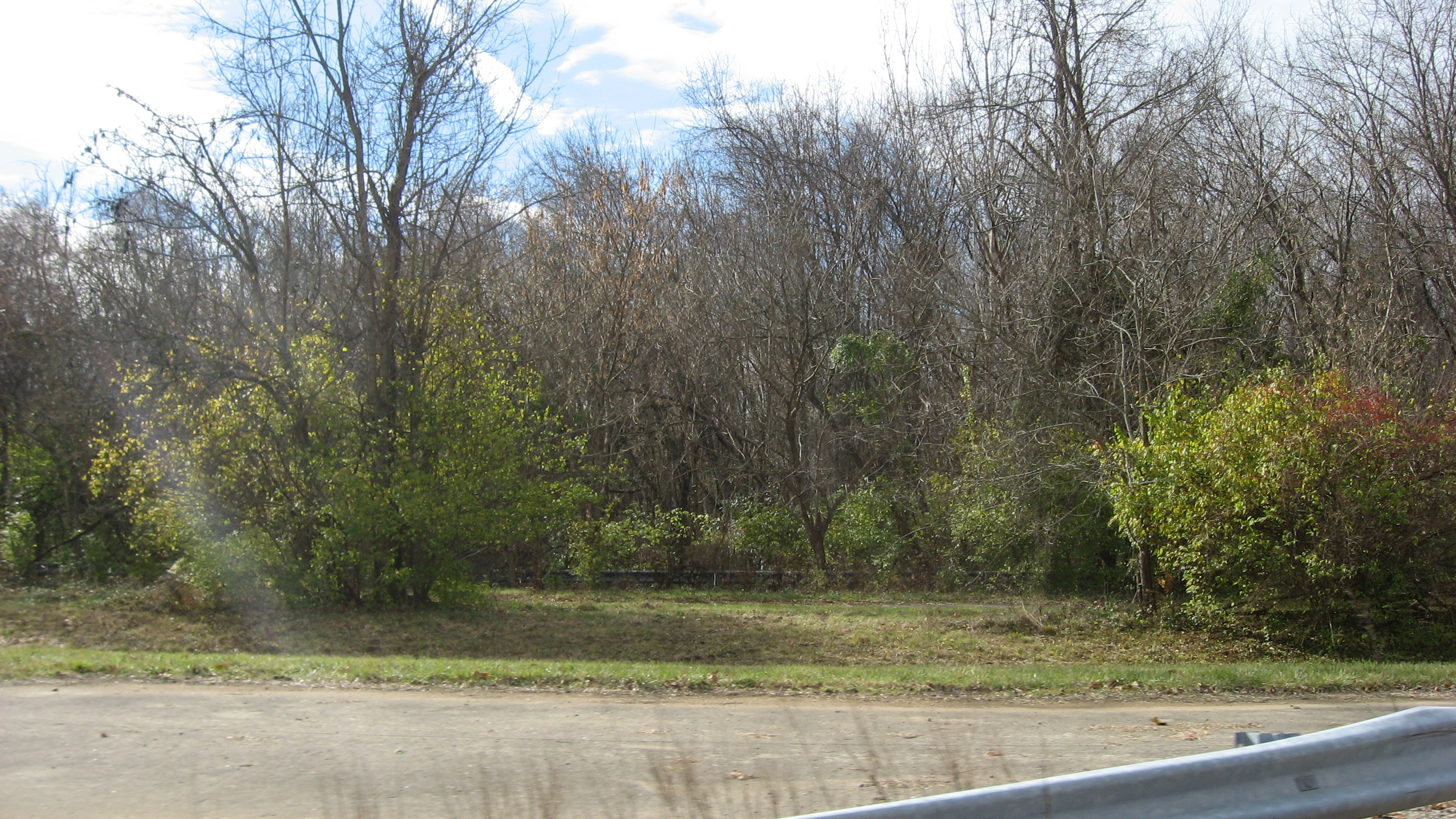
- Overview from the north along U.S. Route 52

- Location within Ohio Location within the United States
- Location: Along the Ohio River, 5 miles (8.0 km) below the William H. Zimmer Power Station
- Nearest city: New Richmond, Ohio
- Coordinates: 38°56′26″N 84°16′16″W
- Area: 3 acres (1.2 ha)
- NRHP reference No.: 74001416
- Added to NRHP: October 29, 1974

The Ferris Site is an archaeological site in the southwestern part of the U.S. state of Ohio. Located in Clermont County, along the Ohio River about 5 miles (8.0 km) downstream from the William H. Zimmer Power Station, the site consists of approximately 3 acres (1.2 ha) of land along an intermittent stream,

In 1970, University of Cincinnati archaeologists excavated the Ferris Site. This investigation yielded a significant number of stone tools, such as blanks, blades, and knives. Synthesis of the artifacts discovered at Ferris has led to the conclusion that it was occupied during the Early Archaic period. As such, it is a unique site in southern Ohio. In recognition of its significance, Ferris was listed on the National Register of Historic Places in 1974. It is one of nine archaeological sites in the county that is listed on the National Register.
