= Ohio Township, Clermont County, Ohio =

Township in Ohio, US

- Township
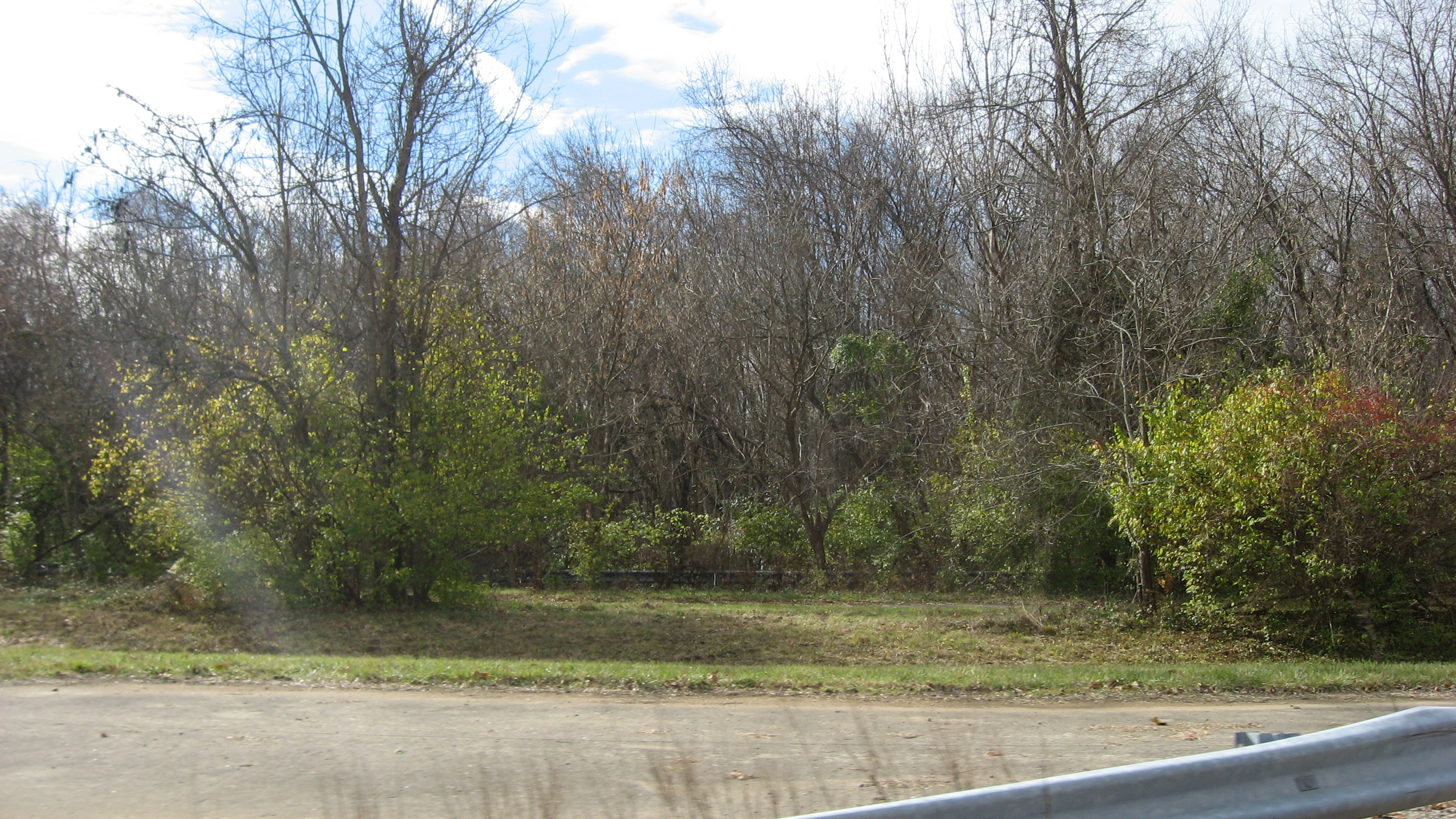
- The Ferris Site, an archaeological site near New Richmond

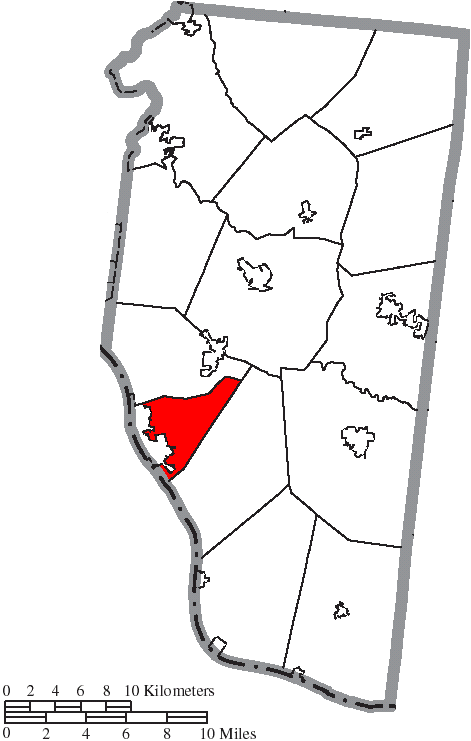
- Location of Ohio Township in Clermont County
- Coordinates: 38°57′25″N 84°16′14″W
- Country: United States
- State: Ohio
- County: Clermont

Area
  - Total: 13.8 sq mi (35.7 km^{2})
  - Land: 13.4 sq mi (34.8 km^{2})
  - Water: 0.35 sq mi (0.9 km^{2})
- Elevation: 630 ft (192 m)

Population (2020)
  - Total: 5,533
  - Density: 386/sq mi (149.2/km^{2})
- Time zone: UTC-5 (Eastern (EST))
  - Summer (DST): UTC-4 (EDT)
- FIPS code: 39-57960
- GNIS feature ID: 1085868
- Website: https://www.ohiotownshipclermontcounty.org/

Ohio Township is one of the fourteen townships of Clermont County, Ohio, United States. The population was 5,533 at the 2020 census.

== Geography ==
Located in the southwestern part of the county along the Ohio River, it borders the following townships:

- Pierce Township – north
- Monroe Township – southeast
- Campbell County, Kentucky lies across the Ohio River to the southwest.

The village of New Richmond is located in southwestern Ohio Township, along the Ohio River. The former unincorporated community of Mount Pisgah was also located in Ohio Township.

== Name and history ==
Statewide, other Ohio Townships are located in Gallia and Monroe counties.

== Government ==
The township is governed by a three-member board of trustees, who are elected in November of odd-numbered years to a four-year term beginning on the following January 1. Two are elected in the year after the presidential election and one is elected in the year before it. There is also an elected township fiscal officer, who serves a four-year term beginning on April 1 of the year after the election, which is held in November of the year before the presidential election. Vacancies in the fiscal officership or on the board of trustees are filled by the remaining trustees.
