= East Fork Site =

Archaeological site in Ohio, United States

- U.S. National Register of Historic Places
- Nearest city: Batavia, Ohio
- Area: 12 acres (4.9 ha)
- NRHP reference No.: 78002021
- Added to NRHP: March 30, 1978

The East Fork Site is an archaeological site in the southwestern part of the U.S. state of Ohio. Located south of Batavia, it has yielded artifacts from more cultures than has any other site in Clermont County.

Located in flat countryside, East Fork occupies an area of approximately 20 acres (8.1 ha). It is believed to have been inhabited for almost 10,000 years, with evidence existing for occupation from Paleoindian times to the end of the Fort Ancient culture. Those peoples who visited the site were likely nomadic groups who were in transit to nearby floodplains. The Archaic component at the site represents a transitional spot during cultural advancement into the Late Archaic. Among the Archaic artifacts found at the site are two projectile points of a type known as "Snook Kill", a Late Archaic manifestation known largely from the northeastern United States.

Because of the wide range of artifacts from so many cultures present at East Fork, it has been recognized as a premier archaeological site. The archaeological value of the site led to its placement on the National Register of Historic Places in 1978.
