= Devanney Site =

Archaeological site in Ohio, United States

- U.S. National Register of Historic Places
- Nearest city: Goshen, Ohio
- Area: 7 acres (2.8 ha)
- NRHP reference No.: 78002023
- Added to NRHP: March 30, 1978

The Devanney Site is an archaeological site in the southwestern part of the U.S. state of Ohio. Located west of Goshen in Clermont County, it appears to have been occupied periodically for thousands of years.

Located along a small stream, Devanney occupies an area of approximately 7 acres (2.8 ha). While it is primarily an Archaic site, the stratification indicates that many later cultures visited the site. Collection of items on the surface of the site has yielded artifacts such as stone tools and rocks blackened by fire.

Few well-preserved Archaic sites have been found in the Ohio River valley, and few of those that have been found are temporary campsites such as Devanney; consequently, it is of great significance in reconstructing the culture of the period. In recognition of its archaeological value, the Devanney Site was listed on the National Register of Historic Places in 1978.
