= Bullskin Creek Site =

Archaeological site in Ohio, United States

- U.S. National Register of Historic Places
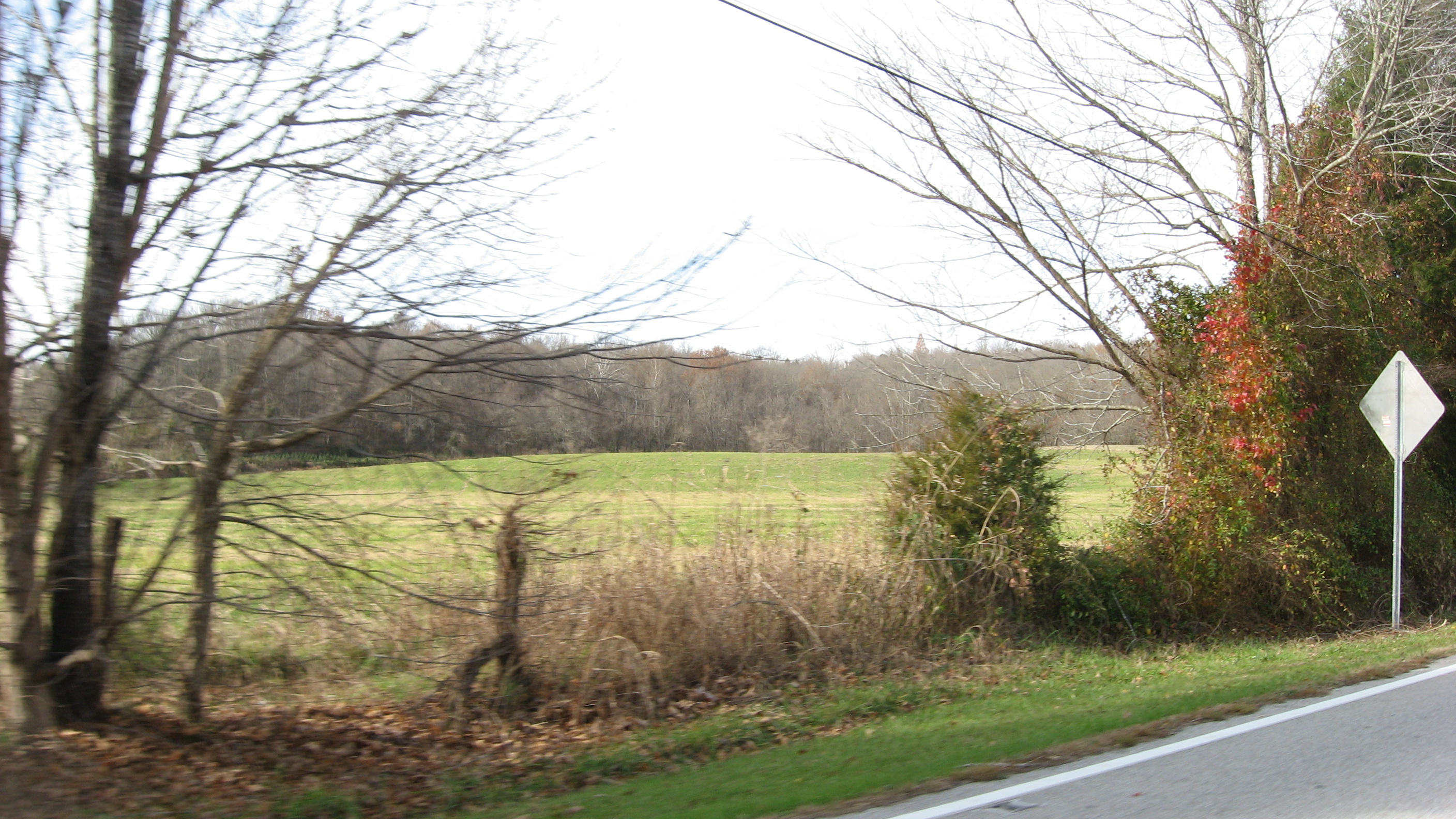
- View from the southeast

- Location within Ohio Location within the United States
- Nearest city: Felicity, Ohio
- Coordinates: 38°46′57″N 84°5′32″W
- Area: 3 acres (12,000 m^{2})
- NRHP reference No.: 78002022
- Added to NRHP: March 30, 1978

The Bullskin Creek Site (designated 33CT29) is an archaeological site in the southwestern portion of the U.S. state of Ohio. Located near Felicity in Clermont County, the site appears to have been a base camp for nomads during the Late Archaic period. The site comprises three loci: two significant areas of various debris and a large midden that underlies everything else. From these components, which cover an area of approximately 400 feet (120 m) by 600 feet (180 m), collectors and archaeologists have recovered hundreds of artifacts, including stone tools, weapons, and bone tools. Because the site is located in a farm field, it has frequently been cultivated, and the plow has brought at least five burials to the surface from a cemetery on the edge of the site. Among the types of features found at the site are ovens, trash pits, and postmolds. Bodies at the site were generally adorned with red ochre and buried in a flexed position.

The culture of the Bullskin Creek Site (so named because it sits atop a terrace above Bullskin Creek, near its mouth at the Ohio River) has been archaeologically classified as "Central Ohio Valley Archaic," along with at least three other sites in Hamilton and Clermont counties. Like the other sites, which are known as Dravo Gravel, DuPont Village, and Logan, the Bullskin Creek Site is believed to have been inhabited during the middle portion of the Late Archaic, between 2750 and 1750 BC according to radiocarbon dating. Among the types of tools found both at Bullskin Creek and at the others are distinctive flint knives, parts of atlatls, and stone axes and pestles. These sites are distinguished from other Late Archaic sites in the region by the knives, which are of a type only found in the region surrounding the Great Miami River. Unique to Bullskin Creek was the presence of what appears to have been religious articles: one artifact cache comprised a wide range of artifacts that suggest that they were the collection of a shaman. Conversely, no grave goods were found with any of the burials.

In the 1970s, excavations by the University of Cincinnati demonstrated that the Bullskin Creek Site was richer than any other site investigated by the university in the previous few years. Because of its archaeological value, the site was listed on the National Register of Historic Places in 1978.
