= Gatch Site =

Archaeological site in Ohio, United States

- U.S. National Register of Historic Places
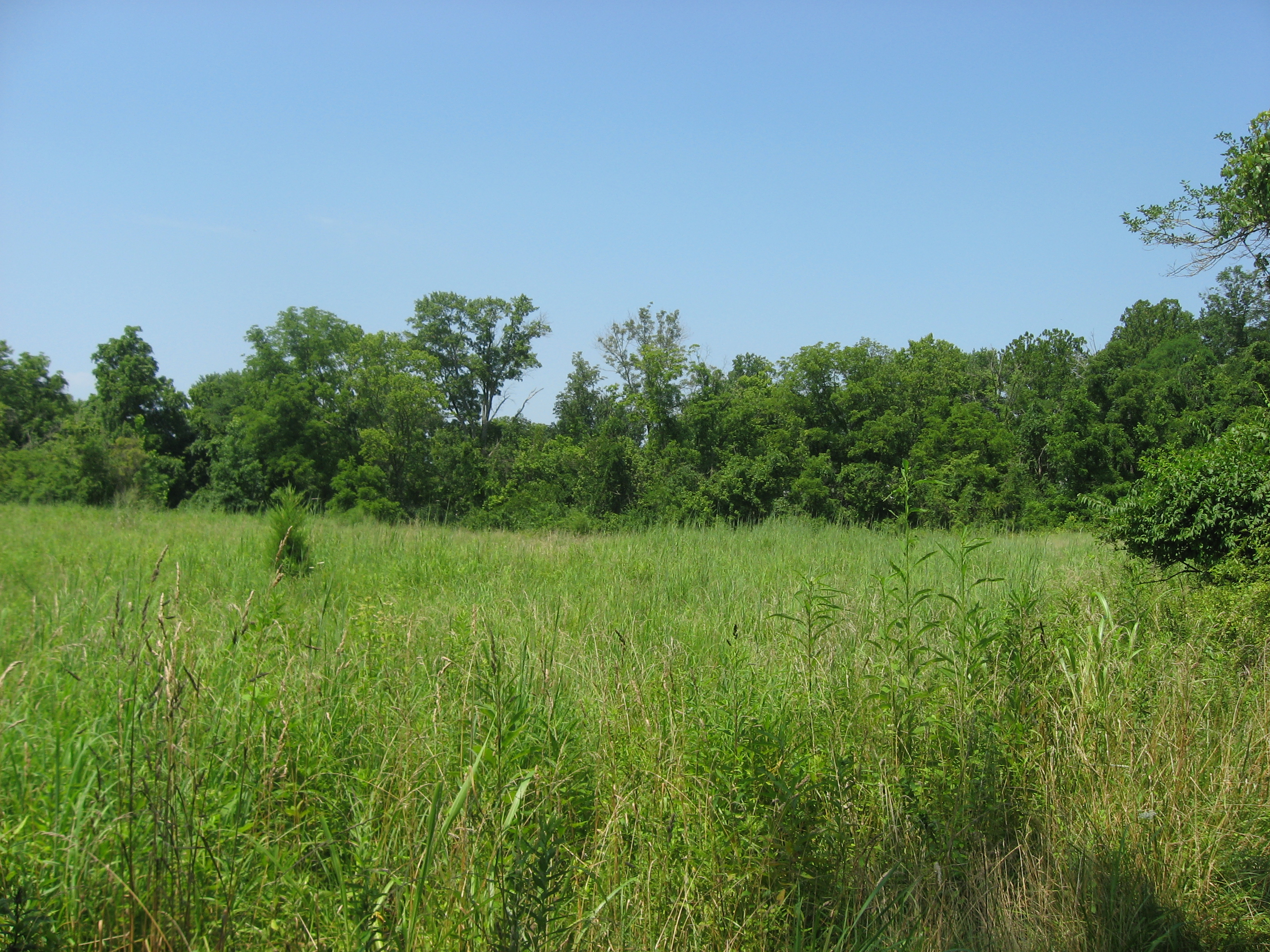
- Northeastern portion of the site

- Location within Ohio Location within the United States
- Location: On the Gatch farm, off Gatch Avenue above the Little Miami River
- Nearest city: Milford, Ohio
- Coordinates: 39°10′12″N 84°17′21″W
- Area: 75 acres (30 ha)
- NRHP reference No.: 74001414
- Added to NRHP: October 15, 1974

The Gatch Site is an archaeological site located near Milford, Ohio, United States. One of the largest archaeological sites in Clermont County, it is believed to have been a Native American village site during the Middle Woodland period.

== Site ==
The boundaries of the Gatch Site encompass approximately 75 acres (30 ha) of land on what was once the farm of John N. Gatch. It has long been known to locals as a productive source of Native American relics; consequently, area residents have collected large numbers of artifacts from the site over the years. Annual plowing increased the number of known artifacts by bringing them to visibility on the surface of the fields. An archaeological survey has observed that the southern and northwestern parts of the farm have yielded the highest concentration of artifacts, including firepits, campsites, and burials.

== Preservation ==
During the mid-2000s, a nonprofit organization, the Valley View Foundation, began a program to purchase property along the East Fork of the Little Miami River with a goal of preserving portions of the river valley from erosion. The core of the organization's project was the "Bottoms" area, located on the northern side of the river west of the interchange of Interstate 275 and U.S. Route 50. This area was once intended for development by a company that purchased the land in the late 1980s; however, after the Milford city government declined permission for the proposal, the company sold it in 2002, and it has since come into the ownership of the city. Located within the Bottoms is the site of the Gatch family farm; in proposing its conservation program, the Valley View Foundation highlighted the significance of the Gatch Site as a leading part of the area's history.

== Recognition ==
In 1974, the National Park Service recognized the prehistoric significance of the Gatch Site by adding it to the National Register of Historic Places. It is one of nine archaeological sites in Clermont County that is listed on the National Register. Among the other eight is the Clarke Farm Site, which like the Gatch Site has produced artifacts from the Woodland period.
