= Withamsville, Ohio =

- Census-designated place
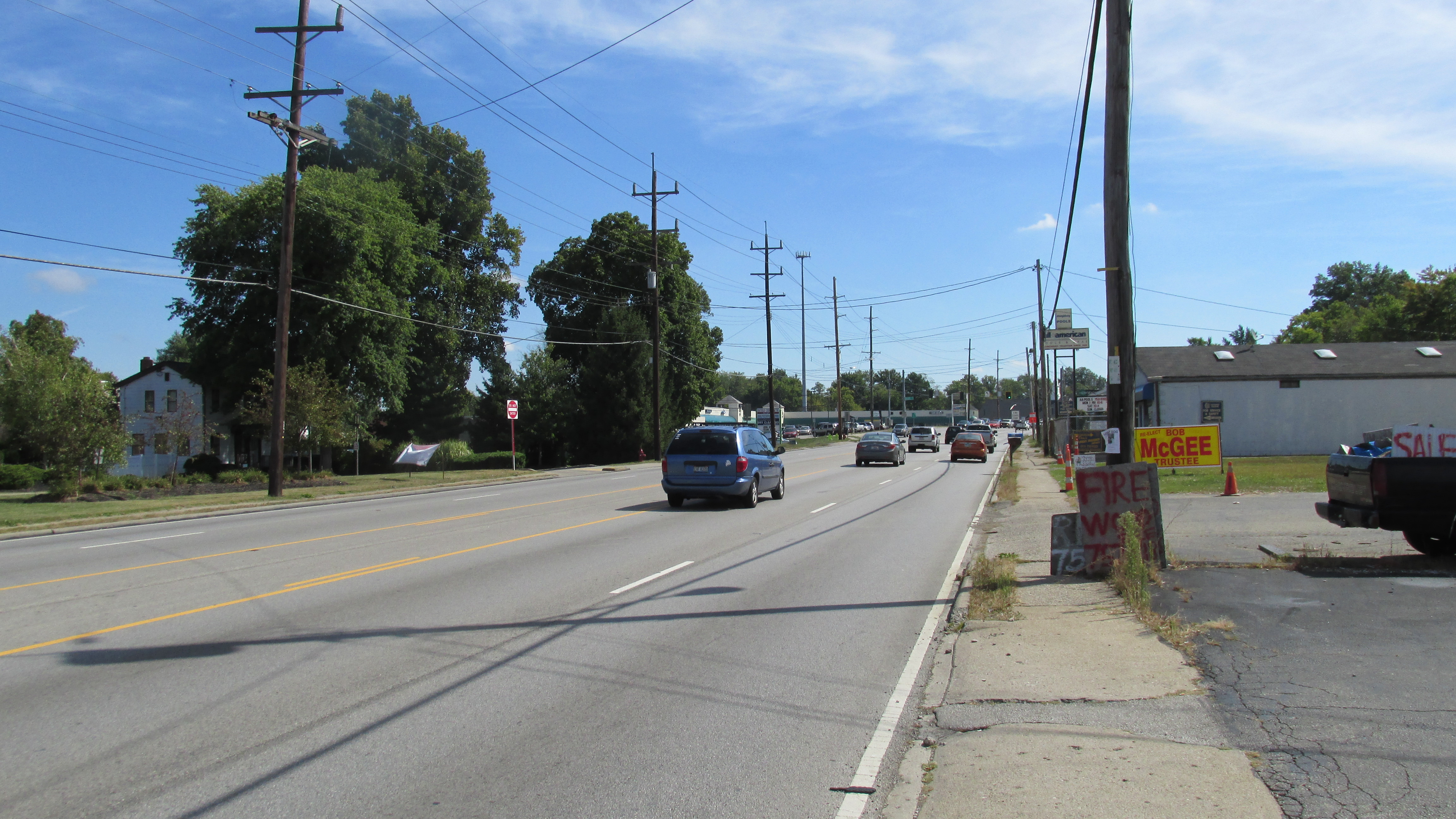
- Looking east on Ohio State Route 125

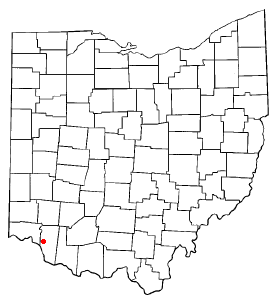
- Location of Withamsville, Ohio
- Coordinates: 39°03′46″N 84°16′51″W
- Country: United States
- State: Ohio
- County: Clermont
- Townships: Pierce, Union

Area
  - Total: 3.13 sq mi (8.10 km^{2})
  - Land: 3.13 sq mi (8.10 km^{2})
  - Water: 0 sq mi (0.00 km^{2})
- Elevation: 919 ft (280 m)

Population (2020)
  - Total: 7,357
  - Density: 2,352.1/sq mi (908.14/km^{2})
- Time zone: UTC-5 (Eastern (EST))
  - Summer (DST): UTC-4 (EDT)
- ZIP code: 45245
- Area code: 513
- FIPS code: 39-86254
- GNIS feature ID: 2393863

Withamsville is a census-designated place (CDP) in Pierce and Union townships of Clermont County, Ohio, United States. The population was 7,357 at the 2020 census.

== History ==
A post office called Withamsville was established in 1828, and remained in operation until 1923. The community was named for Rev. Maurice Witham, a pioneer who settled there around 1800.

== Geography ==
Withamsville is located in western Clermont County along the southern border of Union Township. The southeast corner of the CDP crosses into Pierce Township to the south. Ohio State Route 125 runs through the center of the community, leading southeast 12 miles (19 km) to Bethel and northwest (via U.S. Route 50) 16 miles (26 km) to downtown Cincinnati. Interstate 275 forms the northwest border of Withamsville, with access from Exit 65 where it crosses Route 125.

According to the United States Census Bureau, the CDP has a total area of 3.1 square miles (8.1 km^{2}), all land.

== Demographics ==
Historical population
Census	Pop.	Note	%±
2020	7,357		—
U.S. Decennial Census

As of the census of 2000, there were 3,145 people, 1,305 households, and 848 families residing in the CDP. The population density was 1,796.9 inhabitants per square mile (693.8/km^{2}). There were 1,350 housing units at an average density of 771.3 per square mile (297.8/km^{2}). The racial makeup of the CDP was 97.42% White, 0.76% African American, 0.10% Native American, 0.79% Asian, 0.03% Pacific Islander, 0.45% from other races, and 0.45% from two or more races. Hispanic or Latino of any race were 0.76% of the population.

There were 1,305 households, out of which 31.0% had children under the age of 18 living with them, 52.7% were married couples living together, 8.5% had a female householder with no husband present, and 35.0% were non-families. 29.4% of all households were made up of individuals, and 7.5% had someone living alone who was 65 years of age or older. The average household size was 2.41 and the average family size was 3.01.

In the CDP the population was spread out, with 24.5% under the age of 18, 9.6% from 18 to 24, 33.3% from 25 to 44, 21.9% from 45 to 64, and 10.7% who were 65 years of age or older. The median age was 35 years. For every 100 females there were 97.8 males. For every 100 females age 18 and over, there were 94.3 males.

The median income for a household in the CDP was $45,802, and the median income for a family was $57,153. Males had a median income of $39,223 versus $26,767 for females. The per capita income for the CDP was $22,352. About 4.2% of families and 7.8% of the population were below the poverty line, including 3.9% of those under age 18 and 4.7% of those age 65 or over.
