= Milford, Ohio =

- City
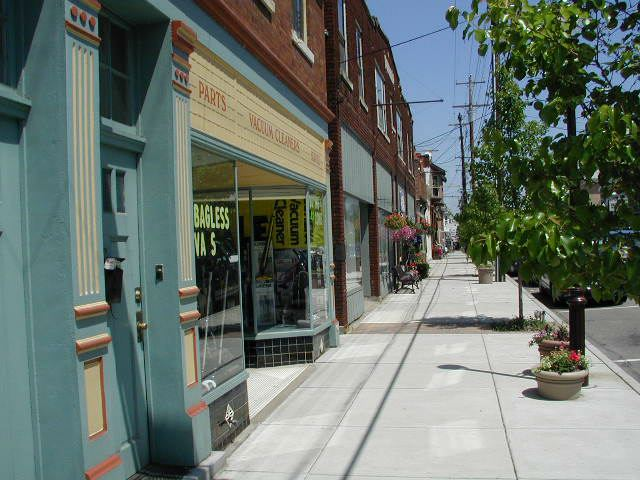
- Main Street in Milford

- Flag Logo
- Motto: "On the Little Miami"
- Interactive map of Milford, Ohio
- Location within Ohio Location within the United States
- Coordinates: 39°10′12″N 84°16′52″W
- Country: United States
- State: Ohio
- Counties: Clermont, Hamilton

Government
  - Mayor: Ralph Vilardo Jr.

Area
  - Total: 3.84 sq mi (9.94 km^{2})
  - Land: 3.71 sq mi (9.62 km^{2})
  - Water: 0.12 sq mi (0.32 km^{2})
- Elevation: 568 ft (173 m)

Population (2020)
  - Total: 6,582
  - Estimate (2022): 6,470
  - Density: 1,799/sq mi (694.5/km^{2})
- Time zone: UTC-5 (Eastern (EST))
  - Summer (DST): UTC-4 (EDT)
- ZIP code: 45150
- Area code: 513
- FIPS code: 39-50176
- GNIS feature ID: 1085671
- Website: www.milfordohio.org

Milford is a city in Clermont and Hamilton counties in the U.S. state of Ohio. Settled in 1796, Milford is the westernmost city in Appalachian Ohio, and located along the Little Miami River and its East Fork in the southwestern part of the state, it is a part of the Cincinnati metropolitan area. The population was 6,582 at the 2020 census.

== History ==
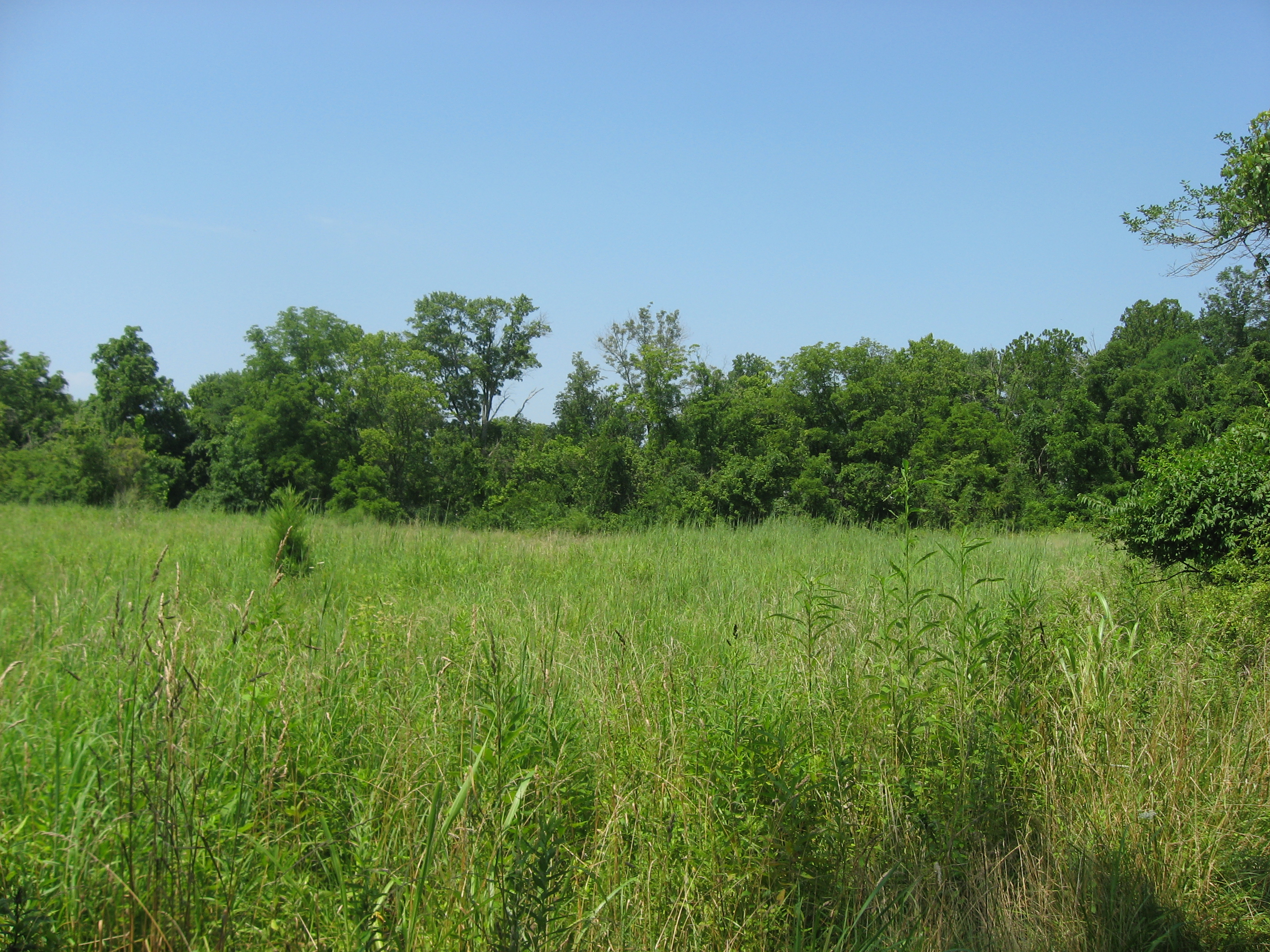
The Gatch Site is believed to have been a Native American village site during the Middle Woodland period

The area covering the City of Milford, O'Bannon (Miami) Township, and part of the City of Loveland is from a single 1788 survey by John Nancarrow, a Revolutionary War veteran from Virginia. As one of Clermont County's major historians noted, "No wonder, then, that it struck with rapture the quaint and eccentric John Nancarrow, who had it surveyed for him on May 28, 1788 as Dutch burgomaster intended to found a city that should become the future metropolis of the West." O'Bannon Township was named after O'Bannon Creek, which itself was named for Clermont's first surveyor who was not connected to, responsible for, or interested at all in Nancarrow's survey area.

The settlement of Milford, which was the first settlement within the 1788 Nancarrow survey's area, commenced in 1796 near where two riverways—the Little Miami River and its East Fork—come together; making Milford tied with Williamsburg as the oldest settlement in Clermont County. The first settler to arrive in the area was the Reverend Francis McCormick, a Revolutionary War soldier with a thousand-acre land grant, in 1796. McCormick built his log cabin on the hill at the present 1000 Forest Avenue and he founded the first Methodist Class in the Northwest Territory in 1797. Nancarrow, the first surveyor, sold his share of 230 acres (0.93 km^{2}) of land to Philip Gatch on December 20, 1802, for a total of $920.00. Four years later, Gatch decided to sell 125 acres (0.51 km^{2}) to Ambrose Ranson who, soon after, sold 64 acres (260,000 m^{2}) to John Hageman. Hageman became the first long-term settler (as Gatch relocated slightly outside town limits), naming the valley Hageman's Mills. Hageman laid out a village of 46 lots; the choicest lot was #1 where the Millcroft Inn was located at Mill and Water Streets, with a price of $35.00 with most of the other lots selling for $25.00.

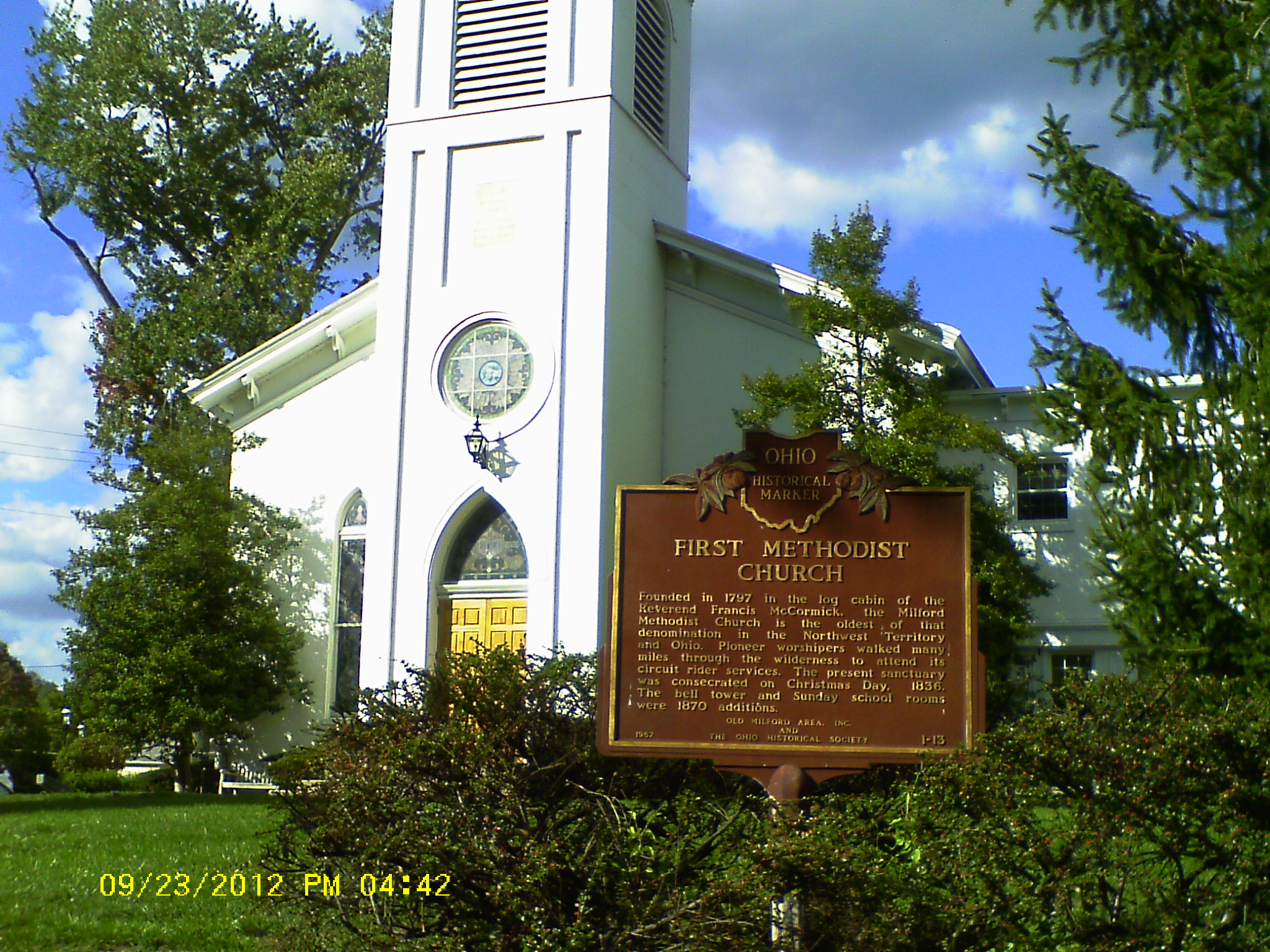
Milford First United Methodist Church, the first Methodist class in the Northwest Territory and Ohio.

By 1811, Hageman had departed for Indiana and the name Milford had come into prominent use, attributed to the newspaper changing it in February 1806 because it was the first safe ford north of the Ohio River to cross the Little Miami River. In 1806, Milford was only three blocks, including Main, Water, and High Streets. With the prominent river ford location to get to the site of its mill, references to the singular name Milford became more widespread to connote the still-unincorporated survey area; in 1814, a newspaper mentioned: "The Ohio Militia paymaster will pay soldiers at Chenemiah Covett's stone house below Milford." An extension of then-town-limits to the First Methodist church alley was made in 1817. People from the outer township travelled into Milford to sell crops, buy flour, visit shops and restaurants, and rest before making their way back up the hill. After the settlement had been platted for some time, the first part of the Town of Milford was formally incorporated January 23, 1836 (as a village municipality), followed by other phases; the corporate area would see enlargements in 1846, 1869, 1872, 1888 (Montauk and South Milford), 1925, 1939, 1950s, 1959 (part of Milford Hills), 1970s, 1981, 1983, 1985-6, and the early 2000s. Voters formally organized Milford Schools in 1867. After generations as a village, in 1982 with a census count of 5232, the village municipality was upgraded to city status, thus being styled forth the City of Milford. Due to the great Methodist influence, including the life of the Reverend McCormick, Milford is recognized as the root of Methodist religious heritage into the American West. Its namesake river ford is still a shallow place seen today as it was when one had to cross the river to get to the old mill.

A field along Gatch Avenue, on what was once the farm of John Gatch, has yielded large numbers of artifacts for several generations. It is believed to have once been the site of a Native American village during the Woodland period. Today, the field next to Gatch's estate is managed by the Valley View conservancy, having been an archaeological site called the Gatch Site.

== Demographics ==
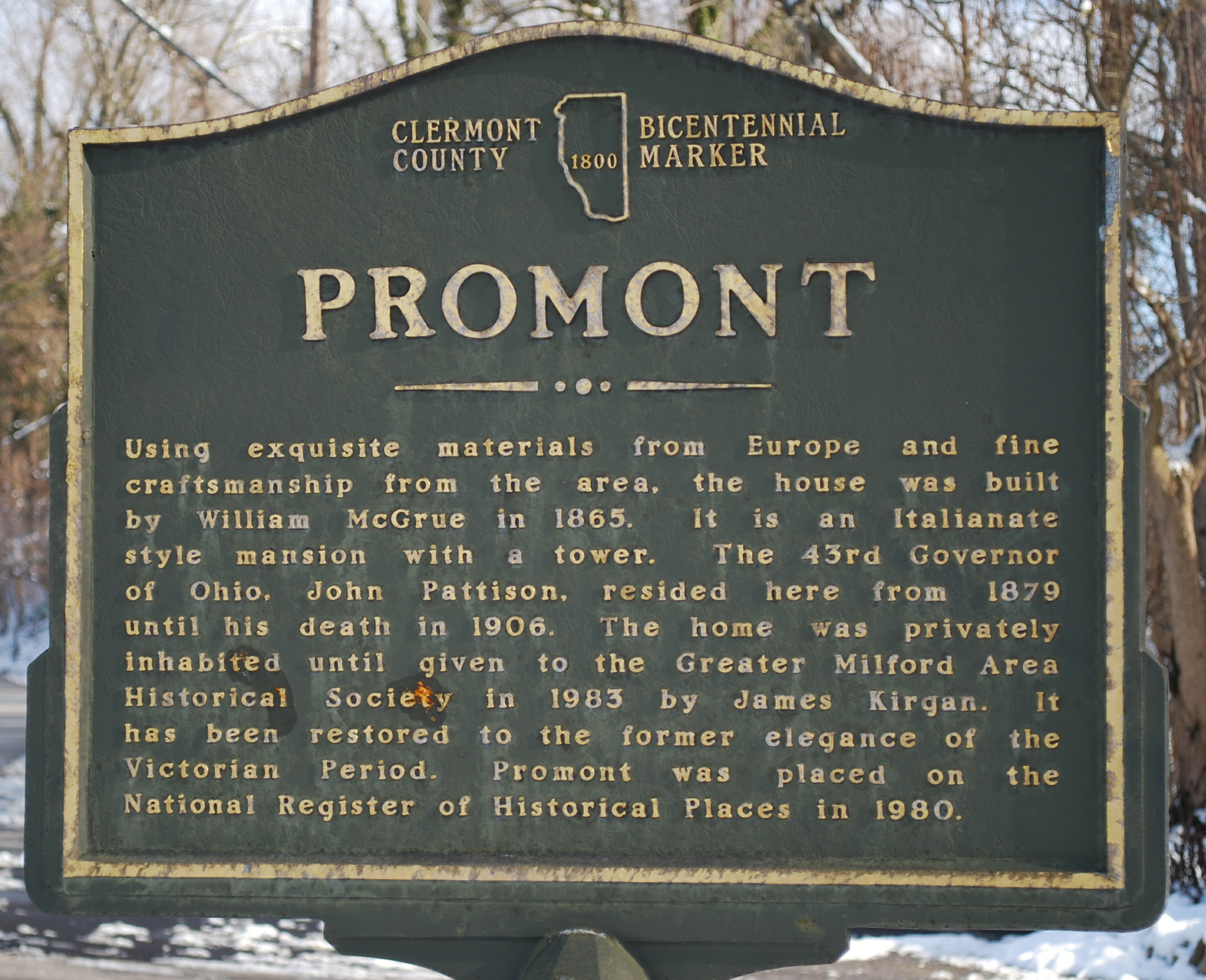
Promont historical marker

Historical population
Census	Pop.	Note	%±
1870	621		—
1880	732		17.9%
1890	998		36.3%
1900	1,150		15.2%
1910	1,322		15.0%
1920	1,526		15.4%
1930	1,916		25.6%
1940	2,140		11.7%
1950	2,450		14.5%
1960	4,130		68.6%
1970	4,828		16.9%
1980	5,232		8.4%
1990	5,690		8.8%
2000	6,284		10.4%
2010	6,709		6.8%
2020	6,582		−1.9%
2025 (est.)	6,436		−2.2%

=== 2020 census ===
As of the 2020 census, Milford had a population of 6,582, a population density of 1,773.17 people per square mile (694.5/km^{2}), and 3,413 housing units.

Racial composition as of the 2020 census
Race	Number	Percent
White	5,989	91.0%
Black or African American	107	1.6%
American Indian and Alaska Native	15	0.2%
Asian	74	1.1%
Native Hawaiian and Other Pacific Islander	2	0.0%
Some other race	51	0.8%
Two or more races	344	5.2%
Hispanic or Latino (of any race)	134	2.0%

99.7% of residents lived in urban areas, while 0.3% lived in rural areas.

There were 3,236 households, of which 20.7% had children under the age of 18 living in them, 34.2% were married couples living together, 24.2% were households with a male householder and no spouse or partner present, and 35.4% were households with a female householder and no spouse or partner present. About 45.6% of all households were made up of individuals and 23.2% had someone living alone who was 65 years of age or older. The average household size was 1.99, and the average family size was 2.66.

There were 3,413 housing units, of which 5.2% were vacant. The homeowner vacancy rate was 1.8% and the rental vacancy rate was 4.4%.

The median age was 47.5 years. 16.9% of residents were under the age of 18 and 25.9% were 65 years of age or older. For every 100 females there were 88.5 males, and for every 100 females age 18 and over there were 84.5 males age 18 and over.

=== American Community Survey (2016–2020) ===
According to the U.S. Census American Community Survey, for the period 2016-2020 the estimated median annual income for a household in the city was $67,188, and the median income for a family was $92,500. About 5.2% of the population were living below the poverty line, including 0.0% of those under the age of 18 and 5.3% of those age 65 or over. About 62.9% of the population were employed, and 41.4% had a bachelor's degree or higher.

=== 2010 census ===
As of the census of 2010, there were 6,709 people, 3,019 households, and 1,572 families living in the city. The population density was 1,798.7 inhabitants per square mile (694.5/km^{2}). There were 3,291 housing units at an average density of 882.3 per square mile (340.7/km^{2}). The racial makeup of the city was 94.6% White, 2.3% African American, 0.1% Native American, 0.8% Asian, 0.4% from other races, and 1.6% from two or more races. Hispanic or Latino of any race were 1.1% of the population.

There were 3,019 households, of which 25.3% had children under the age of 18 living with them, 36.0% were married couples living together, 11.6% had a female householder with no husband present, 4.5% had a male householder with no wife present, and 47.9% were non-families. 41.7% of all households were made up of individuals, and 19.3% had someone living alone who was 65 years of age or older. The average household size was 2.12 and the average family size was 2.92.

The median age in the city was 43.2 years. 21.4% of residents were under the age of 18; 6.9% were between the ages of 18 and 24; 24.3% were from 25 to 44; 25.5% were from 45 to 64; and 21.9% were 65 years of age or older. The gender makeup of the city was 45.2% male and 54.8% female.

=== 2000 census ===
As of the census of 2000, there were 6,284 people, 2,945 households, and 1,534 families living in the city. The population density was 1,672.1 inhabitants per square mile (645.6/km^{2}). There were 3,112 housing units at an average density of 828.0 per square mile (319.7/km^{2}). The racial makeup of the city was 95.08% White, 3.33% African American, 0.13% Native American, 0.45% Asian, 0.03% Pacific Islander, 0.32% from other races, and 0.67% from two or more races. Hispanic or Latino of any race were 0.91% of the population.

There were 2,945 households, out of which 24.6% had children under the age of 18 living with them, 39.5% were married couples living together, 9.6% had a female householder with no husband present, and 47.9% were non-families. 43.1% of all households were made up of individuals, and 21.9% had someone living alone who was 65 years of age or older. The average household size was 2.09 and the average family size was 2.92.

In the city, the population was spread out, with 22.6% under the age of 18, 7.6% from 18 to 24, 28.6% from 25 to 44, 19.9% from 45 to 64, and 21.3% who were 65 years of age or older. The median age was 39 years. For every 100 females, there were 81.3 males. For every 100 females age 18 and over, there were 75.2 males.

The median income for a household in the city was $31,923, and the median income for a family was $51,919. Males had a median income of $36,538 versus $25,873 for females. The per capita income for the city was $22,529. About 4.1% of families and 7.8% of the population were below the poverty line, including 11.6% of those under age 18 and 11.3% of those aged 65 or over.

== Economy ==
Area businesses and groups with substantial operations in Milford or adjacent townships include the headquarters of Penn Station sandwiches, Siemens Digital Industries Software, Total Quality Logistics, Overhoff Technology the North American headquarters of Tata, and the United Church of God.

== Parks and recreation ==
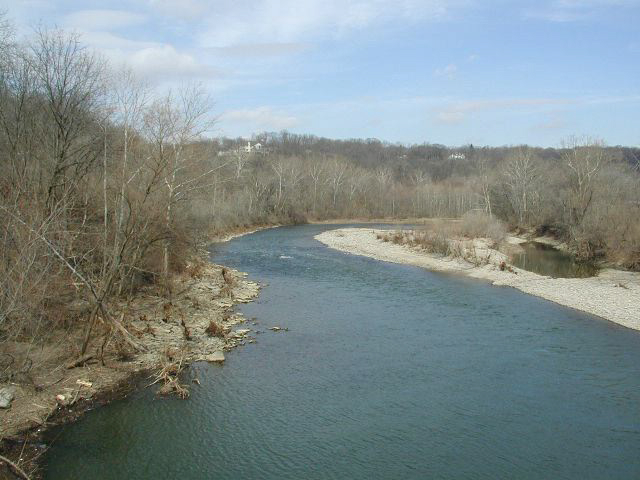
Little Miami River (2007)

Milford is located at 39°10′30″N 84°17′4″W (39.174883, -84.284383). According to the United States Census Bureau, Milford has a total area of 3.86 square miles (10.00 km^{2}), of which 3.73 square miles (9.66 km^{2}) is land and 0.12 square miles (0.31 km^{2}) is water. Greenspaces and outdoor recreation have become plentiful in Milford. The city maintains 10 parks and inaugurated its Five Points Landing Park in 2024: features include a dog "bark park," splash pad, several lawns, and the Milford Farmers Market (market open Saturdays). New Finley Ray Park is the home of the Greater Milford Athletic Association. The Little Miami Bike Trail, which runs from Newtown to Springfield, Ohio, runs through Milford where several major hiking trails converge, including the American Discovery Trail, the Sea to Sea Long Distance Hiking Route, and the Underground Railroad Cycling Route. Being situated in the river valley, Milford is frequently used as a launch or rest-stop for kayaks and canoes. Its Terrell Park, which spans the riparian woodland next to Terrace Park (before the Milford Bridge), is named for American sprint canoer Jim Terrell. Greater Milford is home to Rowe Woods, the primary site of Cincinnati Nature Center.

=== City fairs ===
- Milford Frontier Days, main festival in May and June
- Art Affaire, a crafts festival in September

== Education ==
Milford Exempted Village School District has ~6,600 students. On the 2020 state report, Milford High School ranked within the top 100 out of 750 in Ohio and in the top 10 of all Greater Cincinnati schools. Milford High School currently offers 24 Advanced Placement (AP) courses. In addition to the high school, middle school, and preschool, the six neighborhood schools are McCormick, Meadowview, Mulberry, Pattison, Seipelt, and Boyd E. Smith. The Promont houses the Greater Milford Area Historical Society and yearbooks of all Milford classes. Milford shares a branch of Clermont County Public Library.

There are several private schools within the boundaries of the district. Saint Andrew–Saint Elizabeth Ann Seton Catholic School is a parish-affiliated school serving students from preschool through eighth grade. Milford Christian Academy, founded in 1973 as a ministry of the First Baptist Church of Milford, offers a faith-based curriculum from preschool through high school. St. Mark’s Lutheran School provides elementary education in a Lutheran setting, emphasizing both academics and religious instruction.

== Notable people ==
- Barry Bonnell, former Major League baseball player
- Markiplier, YouTuber and vlogger
- John M. Pattison, 43rd Governor of Ohio
