= Lindale, Ohio =

Unincorporated community in Ohio, U.S.

Coordinates: 38°59′28″N 84°12′39″W

Lindale is an unincorporated community in Clermont County, in the U.S. state of Ohio.

== History ==
A post office called Lyndin (or Lyndon) was established in 1869, the name was changed within the same year to Lindale, and the post office closed in 1907. Besides the post office, a church and sawmill stood near the town site.
