= Pierce Township, Clermont County, Ohio =

Township in Ohio, US

- Township
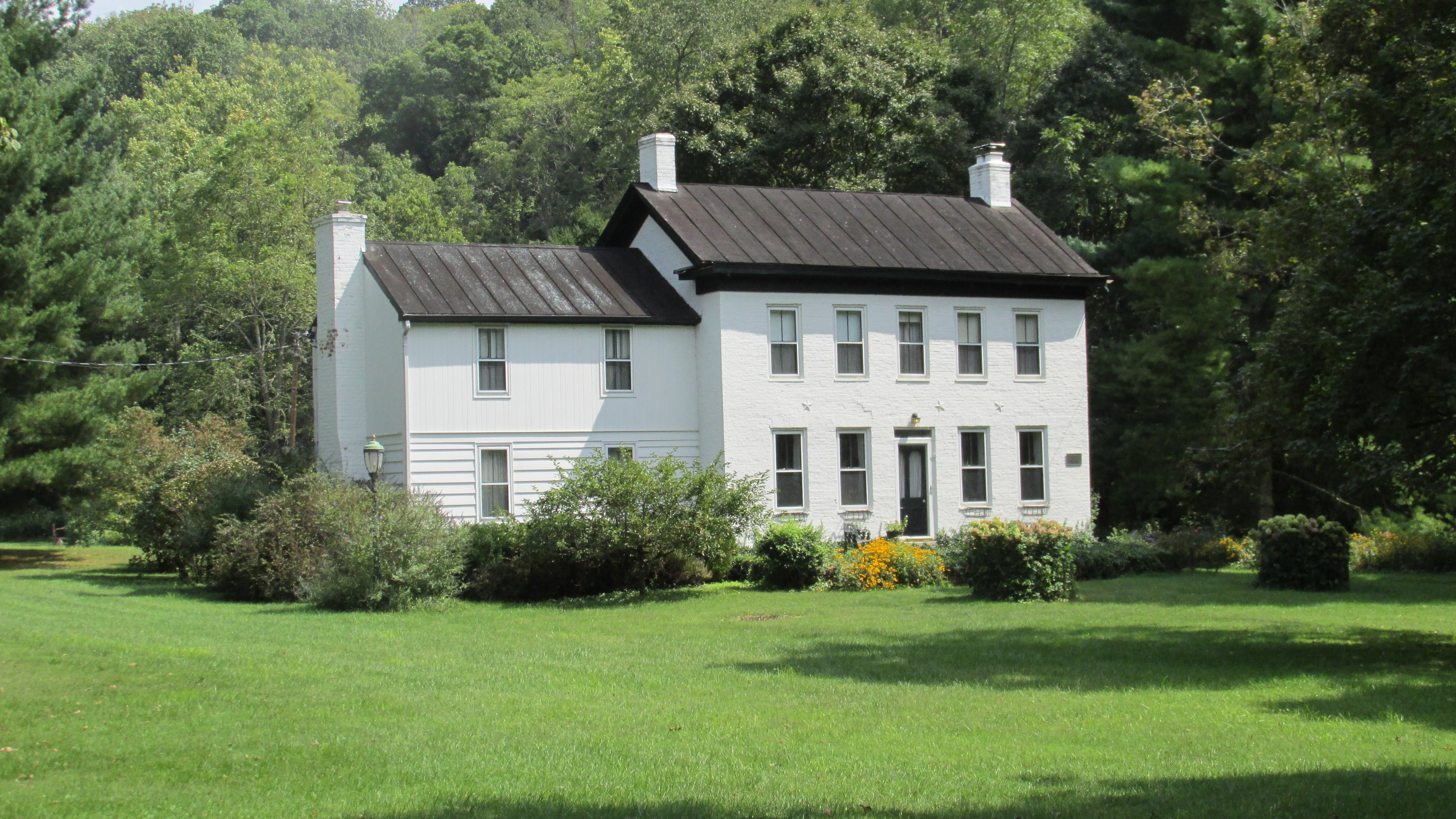
- Gaskins-Malany House

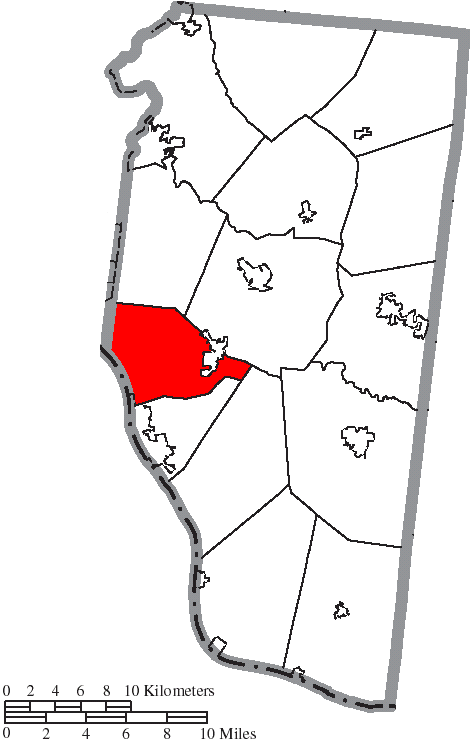
- Location of Pierce Township in Clermont County
- Coordinates: 39°1′23″N 84°15′53″W
- Country: United States
- State: Ohio
- County: Clermont

Area
  - Total: 23.1 sq mi (59.8 km^{2})
  - Land: 22.9 sq mi (59.2 km^{2})
  - Water: 0.23 sq mi (0.6 km^{2})
- Elevation: 899 ft (274 m)

Population (2020)
  - Total: 15,096
  - Density: 628/sq mi (242.5/km^{2})
- Time zone: UTC-5 (Eastern (EST))
  - Summer (DST): UTC-4 (EDT)
- FIPS code: 39-62540
- GNIS feature ID: 1085869
- Website: piercetownship.org

Pierce Township is one of the fourteen townships of Clermont County, Ohio, United States. The population was 15,096 at the 2020 census.

== Geography ==
Located in the western part of the county along the Ohio River, it borders the following townships:

- Union Township - north
- Batavia Township - northeast
- Monroe Township - southeast
- Ohio Township - south
- Anderson Township, Hamilton County - northwest

Campbell County, Kentucky lies across the Ohio River to the southwest.

Parts of the former village and census-designated place of Amelia (dissolved in 2019) are located in eastern Pierce Township. Part of the census-designated place of Withamsville is located in the township's northwest, and the unincorporated community of New Palestine is in the southwest of the township beside the river.

== Name and history ==
It is the only Pierce Township statewide.

Pierce Township was established in 1853.

== Government ==
The township is governed by a three-member board of trustees, who are elected in November of odd-numbered years to a four-year term beginning on the following January 1. Two are elected in the year after the presidential election and one is elected in the year before it. There is also an elected township fiscal officer, who serves a four-year term beginning on April 1 of the year after the election, which is held in November of the year before the presidential election. Vacancies in the fiscal officership or on the board of trustees are filled by the remaining trustees.
