= New Richmond, Ohio =

Village in Clermont County, Ohio, United States

- Village
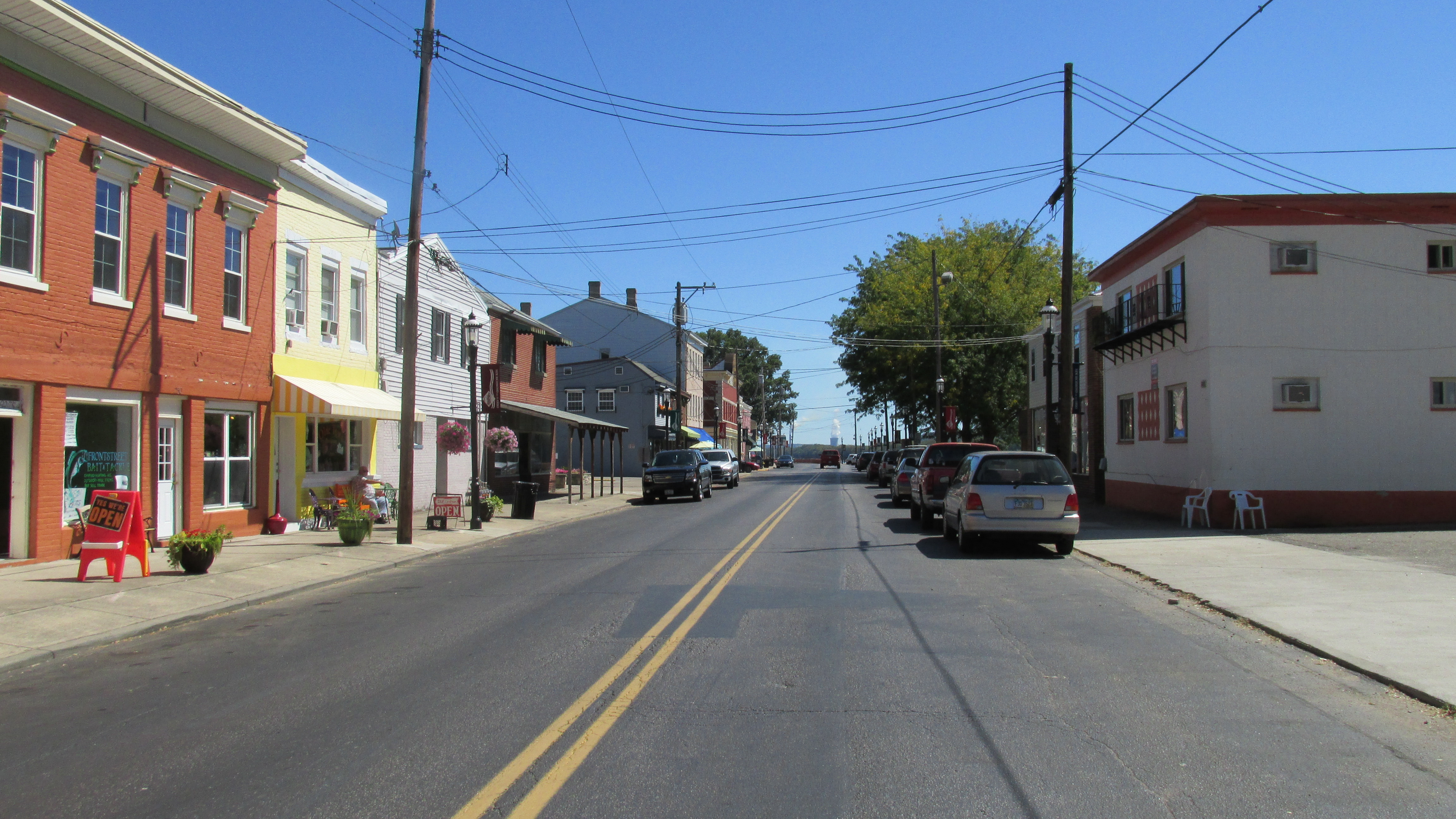
- Looking south on Front Street

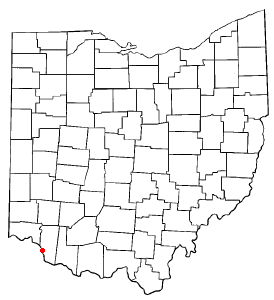
- Location of New Richmond, Ohio

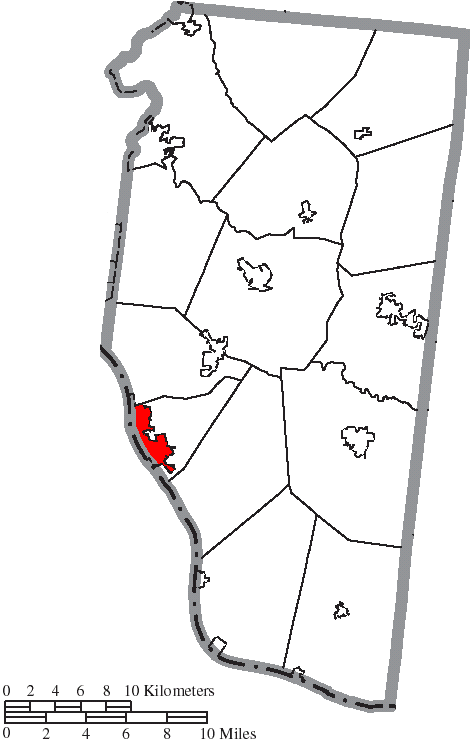
- Location of New Richmond in Clermont County
- Coordinates: 38°58′08″N 84°17′12″W
- Country: United States
- State: Ohio
- County: Clermont
- Township: Ohio
- Surveyed: June 3, 1778
- Established: September 22, 1814

Government
  - Mayor: Glenn Ewing

Area
  - Total: 3.84 sq mi (9.95 km^{2})
  - Land: 3.53 sq mi (9.15 km^{2})
  - Water: 0.31 sq mi (0.81 km^{2})
- Elevation: 499 ft (152 m)

Population (2020)
  - Total: 2,727
  - Density: 772.3/sq mi (298.18/km^{2})
- Time zone: UTC-5 (Eastern (EST))
  - Summer (DST): UTC-4 (EDT)
- ZIP code: 45157
- Area code: 513
- FIPS code: 39-55384
- GNIS feature ID: 2399480
- Website: https://newrichmond.org/

New Richmond, also known as New Richmond on the Ohio, is a village in Ohio and Pierce townships in Clermont County, Ohio, United States, founded in 1814, along the Ohio River. The population was 2,727 at the 2020 census.

== Geography ==
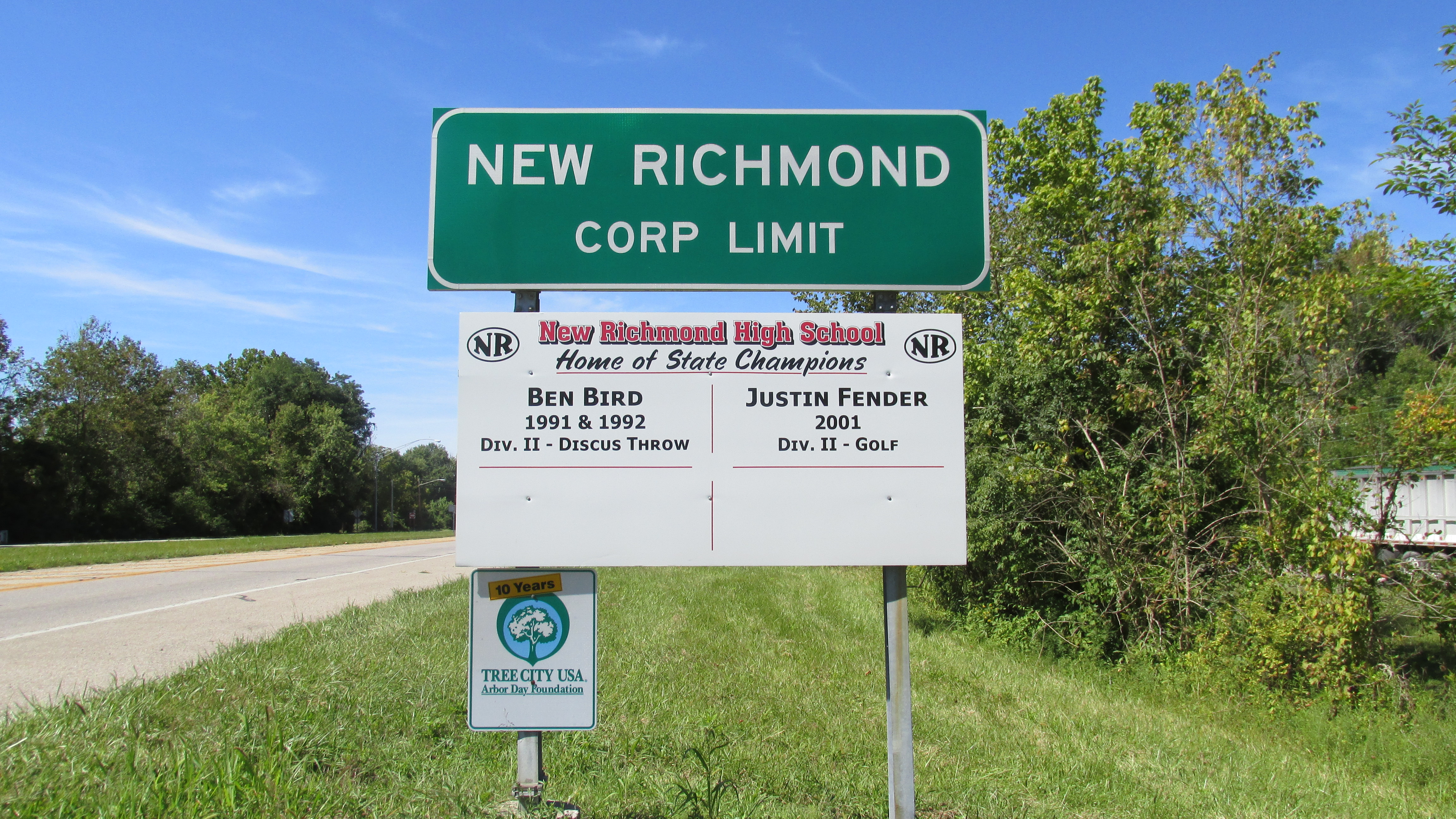
New Richmond corporation limit sign

New Richmond is located within Ohio Township, with the exception of the Beckjord Power Station, which lies within Pierce Township.

According to the United States Census Bureau, the village has a total area of 3.72 square miles (9.63 km^{2}), of which 3.41 square miles (8.83 km^{2}) is land and 0.31 square miles (0.80 km^{2}) is water.

== History ==
New Richmond was once the largest and most flourishing village in Clermont County. Located along the banks of the Ohio River, it had a superior location about twenty miles east and south of Cincinnati.

Present-day New Richmond was surveyed on June 3, 1778, consisting of Robert Beal's 1,000-acre (400 ha) survey No. 847 (purchased by Gen. William Lytle and sold to Thomas Ashburn in 1813) and David Jackson's 333-acre (135 ha) survey No. 1539 (purchased by Jacob Light in 1804). Light laid out the village on September 19–22, 1814, reportedly with the help of his nephew, who suggested the name of his hometown of Richmond, Virginia. In February 1816, Ashburn platted the village of Susanna (named for his second wife) adjoining the upper east side of New Richmond. Among the principal features of Susanna was a large promenade along the Ohio River which still exists today as Captain Ernest Wagner Park.

In 1817, the Ohio General Assembly formed Brown County out of Clermont County's eastern half, leaving Clermont County's courthouse in Williamsburgh at the far eastern edge of the county. In 1823, despite opposition in Williamsburgh, the General Assembly moved the county seat to New Richmond. No courthouse was ever built there; only a year later, a central location for the county seat was found in Batavia.

Although New Richmond and Susanna complimented each other, the General Assembly passed an act on January 11, 1828, that merged them as the Village of New Richmond.

In 1833, New Richmond contained one gristmill, one saw mill, two carding machines, ten stores, two churches, and 120 residential houses.

The residents of New Richmond took an early stance against slavery. The abolitionist James G. Birney began publishing The Philanthropist in New Richmond until moving it to Cincinnati in 1836.

New Richmond was a busy hub of steamboat building with names such as Allegheny, Zephyr, Lancasters No. 1, No. 2, No. 3, and No. 4, William Tell, and Clermont.

Most of New Richmond lies on the floodplain of the Ohio River, making it vulnerable to severe flooding. Some of the first recorded floods occurred in 1898, 1907, and 1913. In the Great Flood of 1937, the worst natural disaster in New Richmond's history, the village lost 250 homes out of 415 total. Floods in 1955, 1964, 1967, 1997 and 2018 again devastated the village. The March 1997 flood sent 6 feet (1.8 m) of floodwaters "the color of coffee with milk" up Center Street and into the homes of about two-thirds of the village's population of 2,500. Houses were found covered in "several feet of river slime", and the New Richmond School District closed for at least a week. Residents relied on personal boats for transportation between rooftops or for evacuation. Governor George Voinovich visited New Richmond High School, which was being used as a Red Cross shelter for flood victims.

On March 2, 2011, the Clermont County Commissioners denied a petition by New Richmond to withdraw from Ohio township by forming a paper township.

A petition to dissolve the village was filed in July 2026. A new boat dock arrived later that month.

== Demographics ==
Historical population
Census	Pop.	Note	%±
1820	391		—
1860	2,211		—
1870	2,516		13.8%
1880	2,545		1.2%
1890	2,379		−6.5%
1900	1,916		−19.5%
1910	1,733		−9.6%
1920	1,714		−1.1%
1930	1,830		6.8%
1940	1,767		−3.4%
1950	1,960		10.9%
1960	2,834		44.6%
1970	2,650		−6.5%
1980	2,769		4.5%
1990	2,408		−13.0%
2000	2,219		−7.8%
2010	2,582		16.4%
2020	2,727		5.6%
U.S. Decennial Census

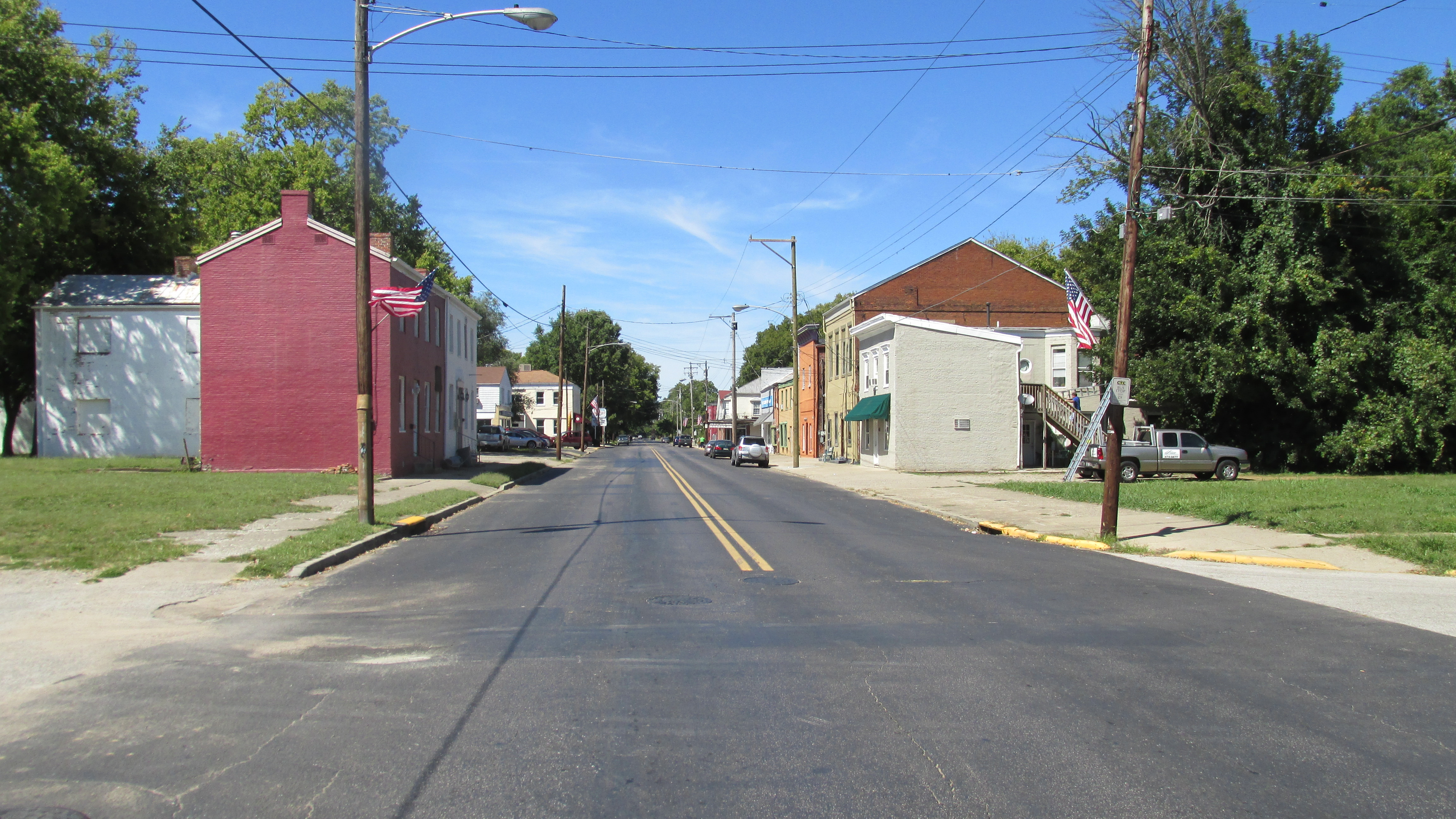
Looking north on Front Street

=== 2010 census ===
As of the census of 2010, there were 2,582 people, 980 households, and 658 families residing in the village. The population density was 757.2 inhabitants per square mile (292.4/km^{2}). There were 1,133 housing units at an average density of 332.3 per square mile (128.3/km^{2}). The racial makeup of the village was 95.6% White, 1.6% African American, 0.2% Native American, 0.3% Asian, 0.2% Pacific Islander, 0.6% from other races, and 1.5% from two or more races. Hispanic or Latino of any race were 1.5% of the population.

There were 980 households, of which 35.8% had children under the age of 18 living with them, 47.4% were married couples living together, 13.8% had a female householder with no husband present, 5.9% had a male householder with no wife present, and 32.9% were non-families. 26.8% of all households were made up of individuals, and 9.4% had someone living alone who was 65 years of age or older. The average household size was 2.63 and the average family size was 3.16.

The median age in the village was 36.7 years. 28.4% of residents were under the age of 18; 6.6% were between the ages of 18 and 24; 25.9% were from 25 to 44; 28.4% were from 45 to 64; and 10.7% were 65 years of age or older. The gender makeup of the village was 50.1% male and 49.9% female.

=== 2000 census ===
As of the census of 2000, there were 2,219 people, 788 households, and 580 families residing in the village. The population density was 644.6 inhabitants per square mile (248.9/km^{2}). There were 888 housing units at an average density of 258.0/sq mi (99.6/km^{2}). The racial makeup of the city was 96.26% White, 2.34% African American, 0.14% Native American, 0.09% Asian, 0.14% from other races, and 1.04% from two or more races. Hispanic or Latino of any race were 0.72% of the population.

There were 788 households, out of which 38.5% had children under the age of 18 living with them, 53.8% were married couples living together, 13.1% had a female householder with no husband present, and 26.3% were non-families. 21.3% of all households were made up of individuals, and 6.9% had someone living alone who was 65 years of age or older. The average household size was 2.79 and the average family size was 3.25.

In the village, the population was spread out, with 29.6% under the age of 18, 10.0% from 18 to 24, 28.9% from 25 to 44, 22.2% from 45 to 64, and 9.3% who were 65 years of age or older. The median age was 33 years. For every 100 females, there were 100.3 males. For every 100 females age 18 and over, there were 97.6 males.

The median income for a household in the village was $40,000, and the median income for a family was $44,271. Males had a median income of $34,318 versus $24,792 for females. The per capita income for the city was $16,744. About 14.3% of families and 17.7% of the population were below the poverty line, including 22.0% of those under age 18 and 21.4% of those age 65 or over.

== Government ==
The village maintains its own police and fire departments.

== Education ==
The New Richmond Exempted Village School District consists of four schools: Locust Corner and Monroe Elementary Schools; New Richmond Middle School; and New Richmond High School. The district has been rated Excellent by the Ohio Department of Education for the 2009–2010 school year.

New Richmond has a public library, a branch of the Clermont County Public Library.

== Recreation ==
Community associations for knothole, soccer, girls fastpitch softball, football, and basketball exist in New Richmond. On February 17, 2021, the Showboat Majestic left its home moor at the site of the Moyer Winery near Manchester, Ohio and arrived to its new mooring location in the village as part of the villages Designated Outdoor Refreshment Area (DORA), an economic tourist area where persons over 21 can possess and consume alcohol along the Ohio River.

On June 28, 2022, the New Richmond Village Council voted to revoke owner Joe Brumley's license to moor the Showboat Majestic at New Richmond and gave Brumley 90 days to have her removed, citing lack of progress in Brumley's development of the showboat's riverfront attraction.

== Notable people ==
- Edgar R. Aston – soldier during the Apache Wars and Medal of Honor recipient
- Todd Benzinger – professional baseball player, San Francisco Giants, Cincinnati Reds
- James G. Birney – abolitionist and two-time Liberty Party presidential nominee
- Earl Cranston – a bishop of the Methodist Episcopal Church
- Albert P. Forsythe – Greenback member of the U.S. House of Representatives
- Lauder William Jones – chemist
- Mary Lumpkin – enslaved woman, liberator
- Tom Niehaus – Former President of the Ohio Senate
- Hank Schenz – professional baseball player, New York Giants,
- Rose Vesper - Ohio House of Representatives from 1993-2000 for the 72nd District

== See also ==
- List of cities and towns along the Ohio River
- Parker Academy (Ohio)
