= List of companies in Greater Cincinnati =

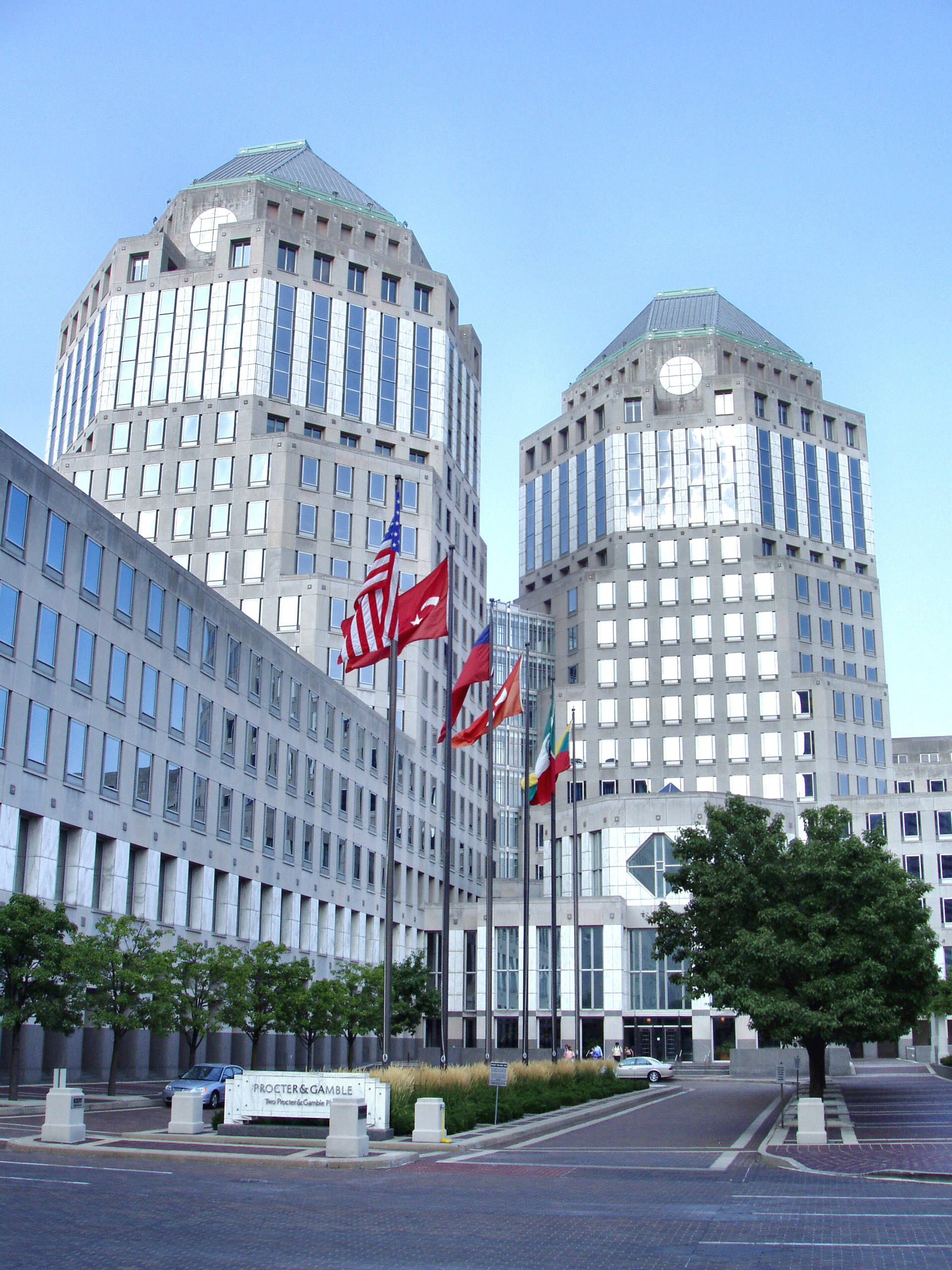
Procter & Gamble headquarters

This is a list of major companies and organizations in Greater Cincinnati, through corporate or subsidiary headquarters or through significant operational and employment presence near Cincinnati, Ohio, USA.

Altogether, eight Fortune 500 companies have headquarters in the Cincinnati area.

== Fortune 500 (2026) ==
- Kroger (27)
- Procter & Gamble (54)
- General Electric [GE Aerospace] (101)
- Western & Southern Financial Group (321)
- Fifth Third Bank (341)
- Cincinnati Financial (371)
- Cintas (412)
- American Financial Group (478)

== Banking and financial services ==
- Cincinnati Financial (Nasdaq: CINF), the 20th largest insurance company by market share in the U.S. (in Fairfield, OH)
- Fifth Third Bank (Nasdaq: FITB), 25th largest bank in the United States; employs 7,645. $13.5 BN local deposits
- First Financial Bank (Nasdaq: FFBC), a regional bank headquartered in Cincinnati; has client servicing operations in the Tri-County, northern Cincinnati metropolitan area; founded in 1863, it has the eighth oldest national bank charter and has locations in Southwest Ohio, Northern Kentucky, and throughout Indiana; acquired Irwin Financial Corp and its subsidiaries through a government-assisted transaction on September 18, 2009

== Commercial services ==
- Belcan, a global supplier of engineering, supply chain, technical recruiting and information technology (IT) services to customers in the aerospace, defense, automotive, industrial and government sectors.
- Champlin Architecture, architectural firm specializing in healthcare, corporate, higher education, religious and civic projects
- Cintas (Nasdaq: CTAS), uniform supplier in Mason, Ohio
- Empower MediaMarketing, advertising agency that communicates to and with consumers through an integrated combination of media
- Omnicare (NYSE: OCR), provider of pharmaceuticals, related consulting and data management services
- Roto-Rooter

== Food and beverage ==
- Grippo's, snack food company
- Skyline Chili, cheese coney restaurant
- Gold Star Chili, cheese coney restaurant
- Larosa's, regional pizza chain
- Penn Station (restaurant), regional sandwich restaurant

== Government, education, and non-profit ==
- Archdiocese of Cincinnati, Roman Catholic diocese, includes parishes, schools, charitable organizations; employs 6,152
- Cincinnati Children's, provider of pediatric health care, research and education; employs 15,260
- Cincinnati Public Schools, school system; employs 5,055
- Episcopal Diocese of Southern Ohio, Episcopal Church diocese, includes parishes, schools, covenants, community organizations
- Great Lakes and Ohio River Division, U.S. Army Corps of Engineers, operates as a regional business center with seven districts that covers 335,000 sq. mi. in 17 states, utilizing about 5,000 team members
- Matthew 25: Ministries, humanitarian aid organization
- Mercy Health Partners, not-for-profit, integrated network of medical services and facilities; employs 6,948
- Miami University, public university of 16,000 students; employs 4,399
- University of Cincinnati, public research university of over 41,000 students, founded in 1819; employs 15,862
- Xavier University, founded in 1831, fourth-oldest Jesuit university in the United States; Over 6,500 students; employs 667.

== Health and biotechnology ==
- CareStar, home health care company specializing in case management for consumers and providers of home and community-based services
- Ethicon Endo-Surgery, surgical instruments for minimally invasive surgery and surgical procedures; a subsidiary of Johnson & Johnson (in Blue Ash, Ohio)
- LCA-Vision (Nasdaq: LCAV), provides laser vision correction services under the LasikPlus brand
- Medpace (Nasdaq: MEDP), a contract research organization (CRO), bioanalytical laboratory, central laboratory, and clinical pharmacology unit
- Prasco Laboratories, pharmaceutical company specializing in manufacturing authorized generic products under private labels

== Consumer goods ==
- Procter & Gamble, (NYSE: PG), the world's largest consumer products company; largest brands include Always, Ariel, Bounty, Bounce, Braun, Crest, Dawn, Downy, Fusion, Gain, Gillette, Head & Shoulders, Ivory, Olay, Oral B, Pampers, Pantene, Puffs, Secret, Tide, Vicks, & Whisper
- Totes, marketer of umbrellas, gloves, raincoats, rubber overshoes, and other weather-related accessories
- The Gorilla Glue Company, a brand of polyurethane adhesives based in Sharonville, Ohio

== Industrial goods and services ==
- AK Steel, steel producer (in West Chester, Ohio); acquired by Cleveland-Cliffs in 2020.
- CFM International, manufacturer of jet engines; joint venture between Snecma (SAFRAN Group) and the General Electric Company
- GE Aerospace, aircraft engine manufacturer;a subsidiary of the General Electric conglomerate (in Evendale, Ohio); employs 7,400
- GE Honda Aero Engines, engine designer and manufacturer for business aviation; 50% owned by GE, 50% owned by Honda
- Milacron (NYSE: MZ), a plastics machinery producer, formerly Cincinnati Milling Machine Company
- Total Quality Logistics, a third-party logistics provider (in Union Township, Ohio)

== Insurance ==
- American Financial Group (NYSE: AFG), insurance and investment holding company; parent of Great American Insurance Co.
- Cincinnati Financial (Nasdaq: CINF), holding company with subsidiaries which underwrite fire, automobile, casualty and other related forms of insurance
- Western & Southern Financial Group, the former flagship sponsor of the Cincinnati Masters tennis tournament, which is part of the ATP Tour (now called the Cincinnati Open)

== Law ==
- Dinsmore & Shohl, LLP, largest law firm in Cincinnati with 625 attorneys in 21 cities throughout California, Colorado, Connecticut, Illinois, Kentucky, Michigan, Ohio, Pennsylvania, Washington D.C., and West Virginia.
- Frost Brown Todd LLC, midwestern firm with offices in Ohio, Tennessee, Indiana, West Virginia, and Kentucky, headquartered in Louisville.
- Taft Stettinius & Hollister, large corporate law firm with office in Ohio, Kentucky, and Arizona. Founded in 1885 by the sons of President William Howard Taft.

== Media ==
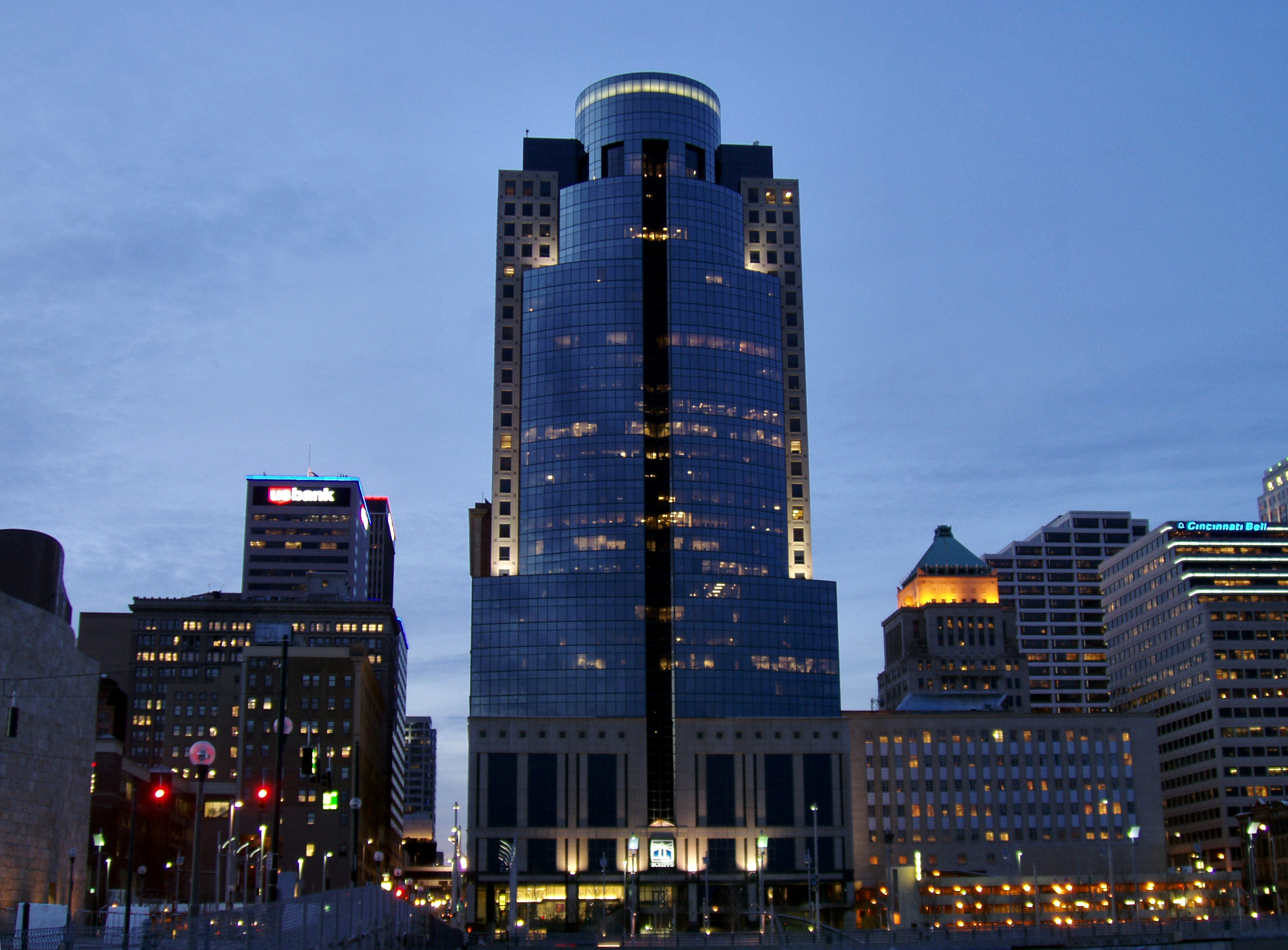
Scripps Center in downtown Cincinnati

- E. W. Scripps Company (NYSE: SSP), a media company that owns many newspapers, cable channels and news stations; hosts the National Spelling Bee

== Retail ==
- KOI Auto Parts, chain of auto parts stores
- Kroger (NYSE: KR), the largest company of supermarket chains in the United States (Fortune 500 #26);chains include Food 4 Less, Fred Meyer, Fry's, Kroger, Ralphs, Smith's Food and Drug, Dillons, Bakers, Gerbes, QFC, Lucky's and Turkey Hill
- United Dairy Farmers, regionally based convenience store and ice cream maker

== Technology and telecom ==
=== Headquarters ===
- Cincinnati Bell (NYSE: CBB), provides voice and data telecommunications products and services
- Cincom Systems, privately held, multinational, computer technology corporation founded in 1968; manufactures enterprise software, and provides information technology (IT) hosting services
- MeasureNet Technology Ltd., private LLP manufacturer of network-based electronic data acquisition interfaces for science teaching laboratories

== Transportation ==
- Total Quality Logistics, North America's second-largest freight brokerage firm
- Ultimate Jet, a charter airline providing daily service to numerous destinations across the United States

== Travel, leisure, and dining ==
- Frisch's Restaurants, Inc., owner of Frisch's Big Boy chain; employed 4,500 as of 2008.
- Gold Star Chili, Cincinnati style chili chain
- Graeter's, ice cream, bakery, and candy shops; the New York Times has called it "the ice cream most connoisseurs feel to be the best in the world"
- LaRosa's Pizzeria, regional pizza chain
- Penn Station East Coast Subs, regional sandwich chain
- Skyline Chili, Cincinnati style chili chain
- Winegardner and Hammons, full-service hotel management and development company established in 1961; one of the original franchisers of Holiday Inn

== See also ==
- List of companies of the United States by state
