= Champlin =

Champlin may refer to:

== People ==
- Champlin (surname)

== Places ==
- Champlin, Minnesota, United States, a city
- Champlin Creek, New York
- Champlin, Ardennes, a French commune in the Ardennes department
- Champlin, Nièvre, a French commune in the Nièvre department

== Other uses ==
- USS Champlin, two destroyers, both named in honor of Stephen Champlin
- Champlin Foundations, one of the oldest philanthropic organization groups in Rhode Island
- Champlin Architecture, an architecture firm headquartered in Cincinnati, Ohio
- Champlin Fighter Museum, an aircraft museum that closed in 2003
- Champlin Memorial Masonic Temple, Boone, Iowa, on the National Register of Historic Places
