= Summerside =

Summerside may refer to:

== Culture ==
- Summer Side of Life, studio album

== Geographic locations ==
Canada

- Summerside, Edmonton, a neighbourhood in Edmonton, Alberta
- Irishtown-Summerside, a town in Newfoundland and Labrador
- Summerside, Prince Edward Island, a city in Prince Edward Island

United States

- Summerside, Ohio, census-designated place in Ohio

== Military ==
- CFB Summerside, former Canadian air force base
- HMCS Summerside (K141) (I), a Royal Canadian Navy vessel that served during the Battle of the Atlantic
- HMCS Summerside (MM 711) (II), a Canadian Forces vessel commissioned in 1999

== Sport ==
- Summerside Storm
- Summerside Western Capitals

== Transport ==
- Summerside Airport, airport in Summerside, Prince Edward Island

== See also ==
- Springside (disambiguation)
