= Champlin (surname) =

Champlin is a surname. Notable people with the surname include:

- Arthur B. Champlin (1858–?), American journalist and politician
- Bill Champlin (born 1947), American rock musician
- Charles Champlin (1926–2014), American film critic and writer
- Christopher G. Champlin (1768–1840), United States Senator from Rhode Island
- Daniel Champlin (1769–1832), justice of the Rhode Island Supreme Court
- Donna Lynne Champlin (born 1971), American actress and dancer
- Edward Champlin (1948–2024), Classics professor at Princeton University
- Ezra T. Champlin (1839–1928), American politician
- Hallie Champlin, 1900 US national tennis champion in women's doubles
- John W. Champlin (1831–1901), member of the Michigan Supreme Court, law professor and mayor of Grand Rapids
- Joseph M. Champlin (1930–2008), Roman Catholic priest and author
- Stephen Champlin (1789–1870), United States Navy officer during the War of 1812
- Stephen G. Champlin (1827–1864), American physician, lawyer, judge and Union Army general
- William A. Champlin, American politician from Mississippi
- Zachary T. Champlin (1847–1924), American politician from Mississippi and son of the above
