= William B. Jensen =

American chemist (1948–2024)

William Barry Jensen (March 25, 1948 – November 2, 2024) was an American chemist and chemical historian.

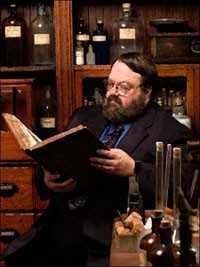
William Jensen in the Oesper Collections

Jensen, son of a sign painter and librarian, was born in Marshfield, Wisconsin. He went to school in Wausau, Wisconsin. He became interested in chemistry at an early age and, after reading Discovery of the Elements by Mary Elvira Weeks, he also became interested in the history of chemistry. In 2013, Jensen wrote Memoirs of an Amateur Chemist: Growing up a Science Nerd in the 1960s, an autobiography detailing his earliest memories, such as receiving his first chemistry kit, collecting pieces of glassware, and winning science fairs. These memoirs were published electronically by the Oesper Collections in 2024 and can be found here: https://hdl.handle.net/2374.UC/768605

Jensen studied chemistry at the University of Wisconsin – Madison, taking a bachelor's degree in 1970, a master's degree in 1972 and a doctorate in inorganic chemistry in 1982. He was then appointed assistant professor of inorganic chemistry at the Rochester Institute of Technology from 1983 to 1986, before becoming Oesper Professor of the History of Chemistry and Chemistry Education at the University of Cincinnati. There he was also curator of the Oesper Collection on the History of Chemistry, the largest such collection in the United States after that at the Smithsonian Museum.

He had an Ask the Historian column in the Journal of Chemical Education. From 1988 to 1995, he was the founding editor of the Bulletin for the History of Chemistry. He was awarded the 2005 Edelstein Award for Outstanding contributions to the History of Chemistry by the History division of the American Chemical Society. As a chemical historian, he was primarily concerned with the history of physical and inorganic chemistry at the end of the 19th and beginning of the 20th centuries, as well as the history of chemical apparatus. He endeavoured to bring the history of chemistry closer to more chemistry students, detached from the history of science.

Jensen was an article contributor to Encyclopedia Britannica. He was also a caricaturist for MeasureNet Technology Ltd. In 2010, Jensen published a book of his caricatures of famous scientists which the Oesper Collections published digitally in 2024. Chymists: That strange class of mortals: Caricatures of famous chemists with a few physicists and biologists added, can be found here: https://hdl.handle.net/2374.UC/768601

In 1982, an influential article by Jensen appeared in the Journal of Chemical Education, suggesting that group 3 in the periodic table should contain lutetium and lawrencium instead of lanthanum and actinium. This question has been much debated in the literature. Jensen was a member of a 2015–2021 IUPAC project to decide on the composition of group 3, chaired by Eric Scerri; so far it has produced a provisional report (written by Scerri), which was in support of Jensen's 1982 conclusion.

Jensen's books published by the Oesper Collections can be found here: https://hdl.handle.net/2374.UC/768600 and include books on the origins of the chemistry community in Cincinnati, OH, titles previously mentioned, and his beloved history of chemistry textbook, Philosophers of Fire.

Jensen died on November 2, 2024 in Cincinnati, Ohio, at the age of 76.

== Selected publications ==
- Jensen, William B. (1980). The Lewis Acid-Base Concepts: An Overview. New York: Wiley. ISBN 9780471039020.
- Jensen, William B., ed. (2005). Mendeleev on the Periodic Law: Selected Writings 1869–1905. Dover. doi:10.1021/ed084p1279. ISBN 9781306364690.
- Jensen, William B., ed. (1989). "Lavoisier and the chemical revolution; a special bicentennial issue". Bulletin for the History of Chemistry (5). (Symposium in honor of the Bicentennial of the Chemical Revolution, Dallas, 1989).
- Jensen, William B. (1996). "Electronegativity from Avogadro to Pauling, part 1". Journal of Chemical Education. 73: 11–20. doi:10.1021/ed073p11.
  - Jensen, William B. (2003). "Electronegativity from Avogadro to Pauling, part 2". Journal of Chemical Education. 80: 279–287. doi:10.1021/ed080p279.
- Jensen, William B. (2004). "A previously unrecognised portrait of Joan Baptista Van Helmont (1579-1644)". Ambix. 51 (3). New York: Taylor & Francis Online: 263–268. doi:10.1179/amb.2004.51.3.263. S2CID 170689495.
- Jensen, William B.; Fenichel, Henry; Orchin, Milton (2011). Scientist in the Service of Israel: The Life and Times of Ernst David Bergmann 1903-1975. Jerusalem: The Hebrew University Magnes Press. ISBN 9789654935807.
- Jensen, William B. (2003). Philosophers of Fire: An Illustrated Survey of 600 Years of Chemical History for Students of Chemistry. Cincinnati: Oesper Collections. hdl:2374.UC/768606.
- Jensen, William B. (2012). Cincinnati Chemists: Assorted Papers on the History of the Cincinnati Chemical Community. Cincinnati: Oesper Collections. hdl:2374.UC/768602.
- Jensen, William B. (2010). Chymists: That Strange Class of Mortals: Caricatures of Famous Chemists with a Few Physicists and Biologists Added. Cincinnati: Oesper Collections. hdl:2374.UC/768601.
