= Mel Hoderlein =

American baseball player (1923–2001)

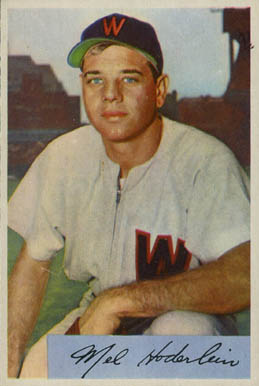
- Second baseman
- Born: June 26, 1923; Mount Carmel, Ohio, U.S.
- Died: May 21, 2001 (aged 77); Mount Carmel, Ohio, U.S.
- Batted: Both Threw: Right

MLB debut
- August 16, 1951, for the Boston Red Sox

Last MLB appearance
- June 6, 1954, for the Washington Senators

MLB statistics
- Batting average: .252
- Home runs: 0
- Runs batted in: 24
- Stats at Baseball Reference

Teams
- Boston Red Sox (1951); Washington Senators (1952–1954)

Melvin Anthony Hoderlein (June 24, 1923 – May 21, 2001) was an American utility infielder in Major League Baseball who played from 1951 through 1954 for the Boston Red Sox (1951) and Washington Senators (1952–54). Listed at 5 ft 10 in (1.78 m), 185 lb., Hoderlein was a switch-hitter and threw right-handed. He was born in Mount Carmel, Ohio.

A steady infielder with good instincts, Hoderlein is best known as a player who was part of seven major league franchises, but only played for two of them. At age 28, he spent four years of active military service and six seasons in the minors playing for the Reds, Cubs, Yankees and Red Sox systems (1941, 1946–50).

Hoderlein joined the U.S. Air Force during World War II (1942–45). After being discharged, he was part of several transactions before debuting in the majors in August 1951 with the Red Sox, while hitting .357 (5-for-14) in nine games. Before the 1952 season, he was traded by Boston with Chuck Stobbs to the White Sox in the same transaction that brought Randy Gumpert to Boston. But Hoderlein did not appear in a game for the White Sox. He was sent immediately, along with Jim Busby, to the Senators in exchange for Sam Mele.

Hoderlein gave three years of good services for Washington, coming out of the bench as a defensive replacement and for pinch-hitting duties. In the 1954 midseason, he was dealt to the Tigers for Johnny Pesky, but he decided to finally hang up his spikes.

In a four-season career, Hoderlein was a .252 hitter (74-for-294) with 22 runs and 24 RBI in 118 games, including 10 doubles, three triples, two stolen bases, and a .327 on-base percentage. He did not hit a home run. He made 88 infield appearances at second base (77), shortstop (8) and third base (3), committing 14 errors in 423 chances for a collective .967 fielding percentage.

Hoderlein died in his hometown of Mount Carmel, Ohio at age 77.
