= TQL Stadium =

Soccer stadium in Cincinnati, United States

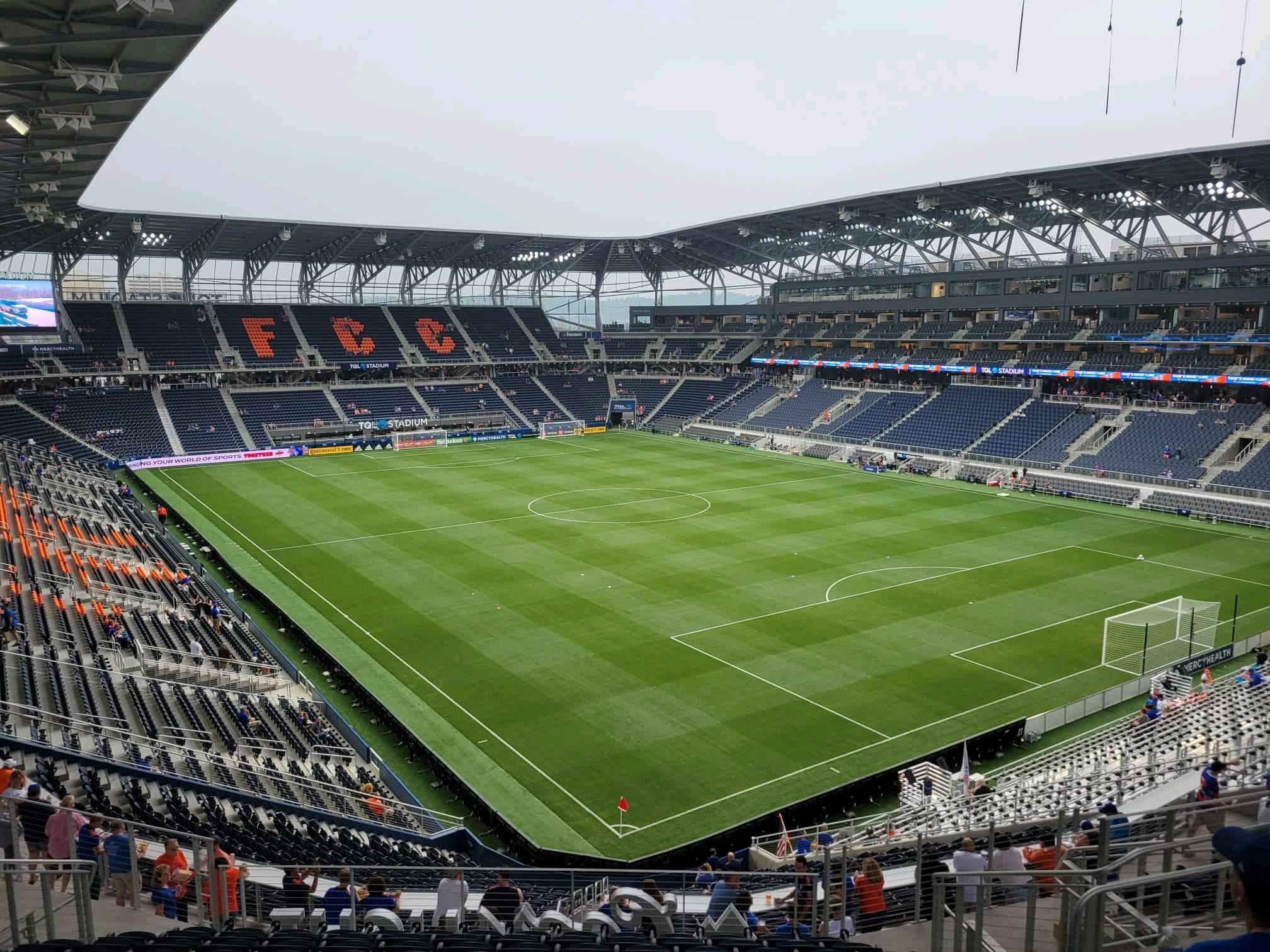
- View of the pitch from the northeast corner
- Interactive map of TQL Stadium
- Former names: West End Stadium
- Address: 1501 Central Parkway
- Location: Cincinnati, Ohio, U.S.
- Coordinates: 39°06′41″N 84°31′20″W
- Owner: Port of Greater Cincinnati Development Authority
- Operator: FC Cincinnati
- Capacity: 26,000
- Executive suites: 53
- Type: Soccer-specific stadium
- Surface: Kentucky Bluegrass 365 (2025–present); Tahoma 31 Bermuda grass (2024–2025); Hybrid grass with perennial ryegrass (2021–2024)
- Field size: 115 by 75 yards (105 m × 69 m)
- Public transit: Connector at 14th & Elm

Construction
- Groundbreaking: December 18, 2018
- Opened: May 16, 2021
- Cost: $250 million
- Architect: Populous
- Builder: Turner Construction
- Project manager: Machete Group
- Structural engineers: Buro Happold & Julie Cromwell Associates

Tenant
- FC Cincinnati (MLS) (2021–present)

Website
- tqlstadium.com

TQL Stadium is a soccer-specific stadium in Cincinnati, Ohio, United States. It is the home of Major League Soccer (MLS) team FC Cincinnati, who have played there since the stadium opened on May 16, 2021. The stadium holds approximately 26,000 spectators and is located in the West End neighborhood, at the former site of Stargel Stadium on Central Parkway at Wade Street. It has a Bermuda grass surface that was installed in 2024 to replace an earlier hybrid grass surface. During construction, the stadium was also known as the West End Stadium.

The stadium was proposed in 2016, as part of the team's bid for an MLS expansion franchise, to replace their temporary arrangement at Nippert Stadium. A list of sites was submitted with the bid in January 2017 and later narrowed to three candidates: in Oakley, the West End, and Newport, Kentucky. The West End site was chosen in early 2018 and approved in April through a land swap deal with Cincinnati Public Schools.

On May 29, 2018, MLS announced that Cincinnati had won an expansion team, to begin play in 2019 at Nippert Stadium. A groundbreaking ceremony was held on December 18, 2018, and the stadium officially opened for the 2021 season at a total cost of $250 million. Locally based Total Quality Logistics was named the naming rights sponsor in April 2021. TQL Stadium has hosted several matches for international teams, including in the 2023 CONCACAF Gold Cup, and part of the 2025 FIFA Club World Cup.

== Planning ==
=== Background ===
FC Cincinnati was founded in 2015 and played its first three seasons in the second-division United Soccer League (since renamed the USL Championship) at Nippert Stadium, a college football venue. After a successful first season in which the team's home games averaged 17,296 attendees, the club's ownership group began negotiations with Major League Soccer to bid for an expansion franchise. Cincinnati formally submitted its expansion bid in January 2017, including a shortlist of locations for a potential stadium to meet the bid's requirement for a soccer-specific venue.

FC Cincinnati's management first suggested the possibility of building a new stadium in late November 2016, when the club hosted MLS commissioner Don Garber for a day-long visit. During a town hall meeting held with club supporters that day, Garber suggested that Nippert was not a long-term solution for the team. Club president Jeff Berding said during the meeting that the club had recently begun to look for 15-to-20-acre (6.1 to 8.1 ha) sites in or near the "urban core" of Cincinnati.

=== Location decision and negotiations ===
1 West End
2 Newport
3 Oakley

FC Cincinnati narrowed the list of locations for a potential stadium to a shortlist of three sites in May 2017: the football stadium used by Taft High School in the West End neighborhood; the former Milacron factory in Oakley on Interstate 71; and a riverfront site in Newport, Kentucky. The club unveiled preliminary designs for a stadium in June 2017, outlining plans for a horseshoe-shaped stadium with a continuous roof and capacity for 25,000 to 30,000 people. It was designed by Dan Meis, who envisioned steep terraced seating and homages to Allianz Arena in Munich, including the use of LED lights and a translucent ETFE roof, for use at the three shortlist sites.

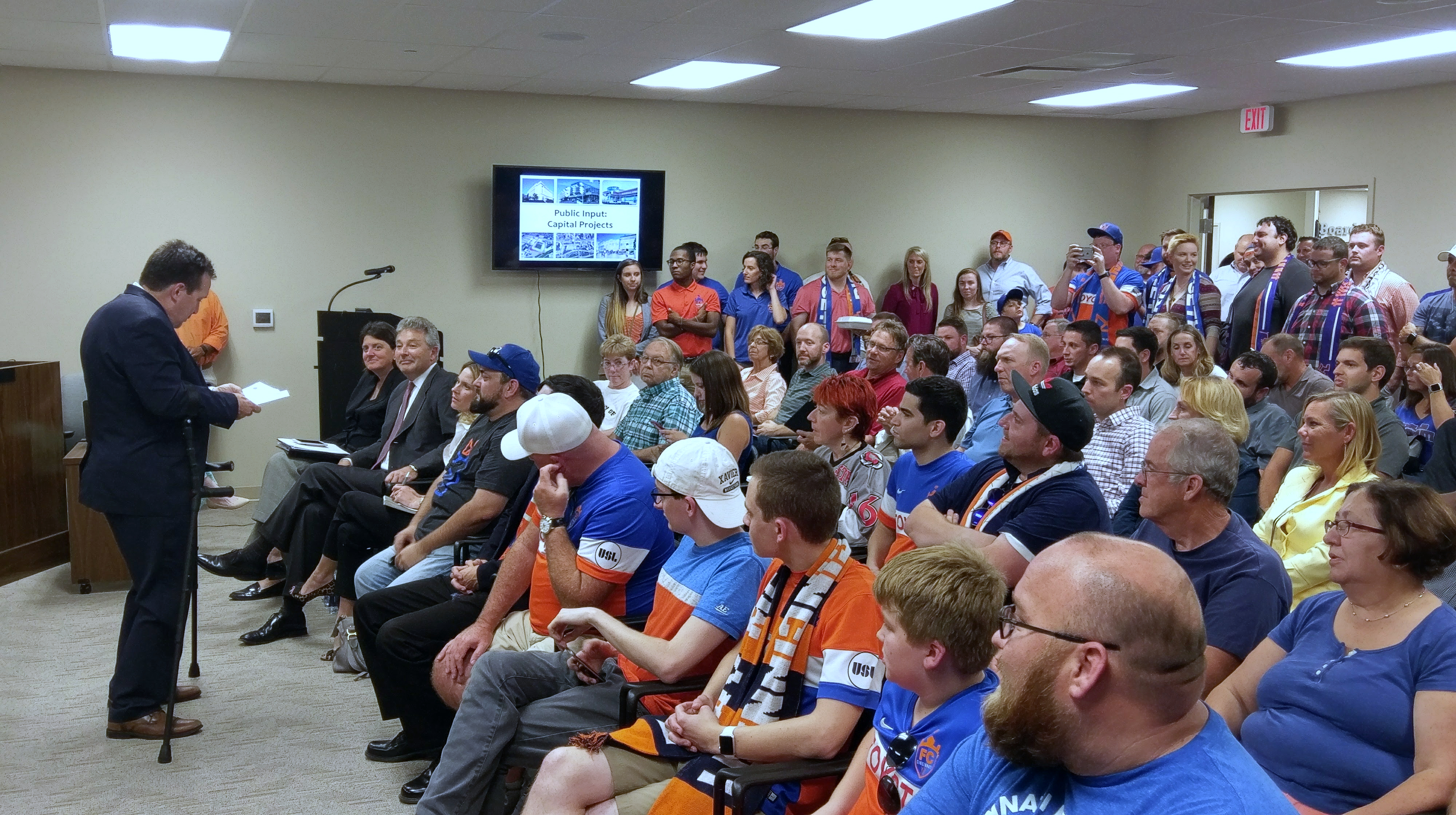
Hamilton County commissioner Todd Portune speaks at a 2017 public hearing which was attended by many FC Cincinnati supporters advocating for stadium funding.

On November 29, 2017, the Cincinnati City Council passed legislation that would fund infrastructure improvements and a parking garage at the stadium, should a location within the city be chosen. The Oakley site was named as the leading candidate and formed the basis of the city council's infrastructure legislation. FC Cincinnati presented its bid to MLS in December, including a stadium at the Oakley site, but the Nashville bid was chosen instead for a 2020 expansion.

The club signed an option contract with the Cincinnati Metropolitan Housing Authority to acquire land in the West End neighborhood in January 2018, signaling their intent to choose the site. The following month, FC Cincinnati revealed plans to perform a land swap with Cincinnati Public Schools to acquire Stargel Stadium on the campus of Taft High School, with a new high school stadium being built nearby. The land swap would require the approval of the Cincinnati Public School's board of directors, who declined to accept the club's offer because of tax abatement rules, which would require an additional $20 million in taxes to be paid by FC Cincinnati. In response, FC Cincinnati announced in March that it would remove the West End site from consideration and focus on the remaining two sites, which had the support of their respective county governments. By early April, however, the club had announced that the Oakley and Newport sites were out of contention, due to the remoteness of the Oakley site and a landowner dispute in Newport, and that FC Cincinnati would restart negotiations for the West End site.

The school board received an offer from the club to pay $25 million and build a new $10 million high school stadium and unanimously approved the land swap on April 10. The club signed a community benefits agreement with the West End Neighborhood Council, despite opposition from a majority of the council, but the proposal was amended and agreed to by a majority of the council weeks later. On April 16, the city council voted 5–4 for an ordinance that would fund $40 million in infrastructure improvements to support the stadium project. A second city council vote on May 16 approved the community benefits agreement and was the final city action needed before a decision by MLS. The league awarded the expansion franchise in an announcement on May 29.

The construction of a new $200 million stadium with public money remained controversial, culminating in the formation of a citizens' group in 2017 to push Nippert Stadium as the permanent home of Cincinnati's MLS team. FC Cincinnati ruled out the use of Nippert Stadium due to the stadium's outdated design that would present construction challenges. During the final negotiations for the West End site, a separate group proposed that the community benefits agreement be decided in a public referendum, but were rejected on the grounds that the city council used an emergency ordinance to approve the stadium deal.

=== Design revisions and criticism ===
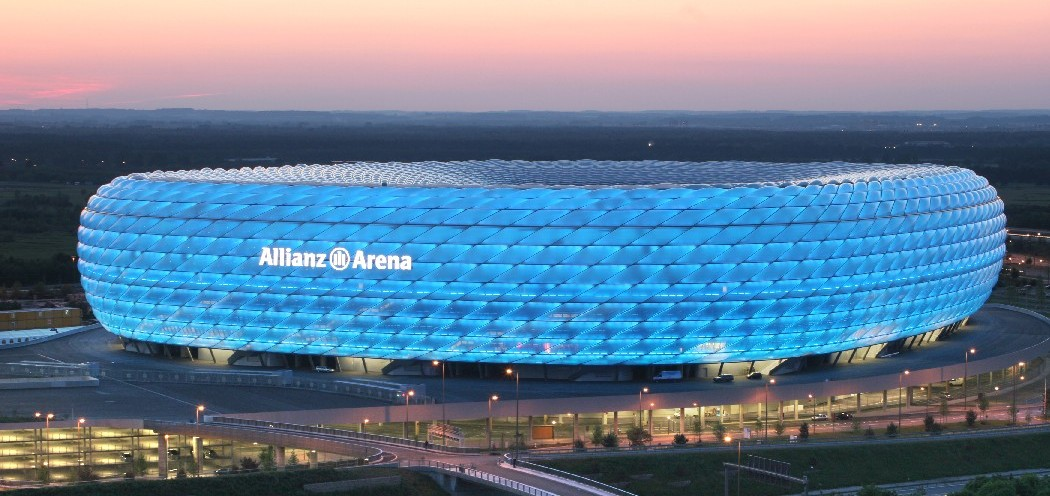
Architect Dan Meis drew inspiration from Allianz Arena in Munich, which features an LED-illuminated exterior made of ETFE.

Under a preliminary design schematic released in May 2018, the stadium would have 21,080 seats, with 16,610 general admission seats and 3,970 premium seats. An additional 7,000 seats would be added by filling in two of the corners and ends. However, in June 2018, the club said that they were essentially "starting over" on designing the stadium. Club president Jeff Berding said that he expected the capacity to be somewhere between 21,000 and 30,000 spectators, depending on what the club could afford.

In October 2018, FC Cincinnati released new design concept images of the West End Stadium for the first time since the stadium site had been finalized. As in previous designs, the roof and exterior facades would be made of ETFE foil, a translucent material upon which colors and designs may be projected. The stadium was now expected to hold between 25,500 and 26,500 attendees, which would make it one of the largest soccer-specific stadiums in North America. The dimensions of the stadium were also announced with new precision; the club shared draft images showing the precise footprint of the stadium within its land plot, and declared that the stadium's maximum height would be less than 120 feet (37 m).

In response to criticism from West End residents, the stadium design was revised again in February 2019. The roof's orange color was replaced, and the 428-stall parking garage was relocated to the intersection of Central Parkway and Wade Street. Plans for 100,000 square feet (9,300 m^{2}) in additional residential and commercial development along Central Parkway were scrapped in favor of opening the street with a pedestrian plaza. The stadium's design was also constrained by a Duke Energy transmission line that is buried underneath the site. The city government subsequently approved an additional land sale for the stadium during the same month, for a police parking lot that would grant the city $8 million in revenue. The club also contracted a consulting firm to determine the stadium's impact to the nearby Cincinnati Music Hall, including tests with blank cartridges from a shotgun, and concluded that the stadium noise would interfere with musical performances.

MEIS Architects was removed as the head architecture firm from the project by FC Cincinnati and replaced by Populous, a Kansas City-based company responsible for several MLS venues. The new design revision, announced in March 2019, restored a reduced version of the orange lighting on the roof and exterior and expanded the canopy to cover the entire seating area. A grand staircase would connect the stadium's concourse with Central Parkway, while the exterior walls were redesigned to resemble a series of "ribbons" that wrap around the outer bowl. The club also acquired several additional properties in April 2019 along Wade Street to build a larger parking structure. A zoning change to support commercial development on the Wade Street site drew criticism due to the potential displacement of at least 17 residents from the existing apartment buildings on the property.

In July 2019, Populous and FC Cincinnati unveiled a new design for the West End Stadium that replaced the exterior lighting and ETFE facade with vertical "fins" that individually light up to create special effects and animations. There were to be 513 fins, a homage to Cincinnati's 513 area code, each 2 to 3 inches (5.1 to 7.6 cm) wide and 18 inches (46 cm) deep, but the number was later reduced to 387 (of which 287 are lit). The club's proposal to extend the lighting scheme to include advertisements and other promotions was opposed by the Over-the-Rhine Community Council, who also criticized the permitting of year-round lighting. The final seating capacity was planned to be 26,000 spectators, including 59 suites and a premium club area with 4,500 seats. The stadium will include 3,100 seats in a safe standing terrace that will replace The Bailey. The patterns and colors of the seating area, featuring navy blue seats and "Gary" the winged lion from the club crest in orange, were chosen from four options by a public poll in May 2020.

=== Funding ===
The stadium cost $250 million to construct, with the majority of funding coming from FC Cincinnati and its ownership group. The club also funded $6.2 million in West End improvements and $10 million for a new high school football stadium, in addition to $25 million to Cincinnati Public Schools as part of the land use agreement. Infrastructure improvements around the stadium will be paid for using $34 million in city funds from a local tax increment financing district and $19 million from Hamilton County and the State of Ohio. In June 2018, the club named U.S. Bank as the financial partner for the project.

== Construction ==
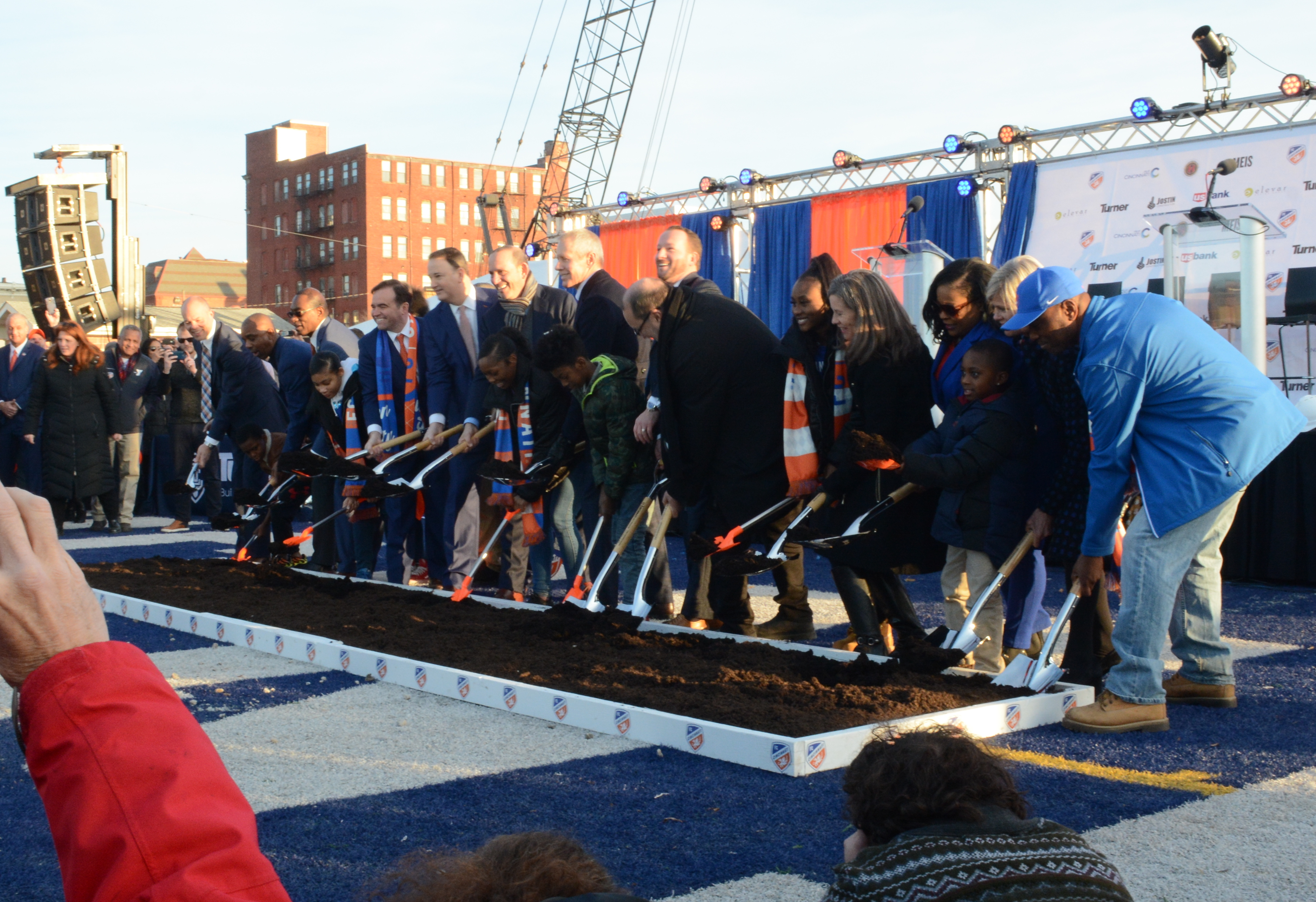
Club and city officials participating in a groundbreaking ceremony on December 18, 2018

TQL Stadium was designed by Populous, MEIS Architects, and Elevar Design Group. Turner Construction was the general contractor, working alongside Jostin Construction, and employed 200 to 400 workers during construction. Machete Group oversaw the project as the owner's representative. The original Stargel Stadium closed permanently on October 26, 2018, and demolition began the following month while the property was transferred from Cincinnati Public Schools to the club for $10 million. The new Stargel Stadium was built southwest of Taft High School and opened in September 2019 for the fall sports season after a month-long construction delay.

A ceremonial groundbreaking for the TQL Stadium took place on December 18, 2018, attended by league commissioner Don Garber and local elected officials. Construction was scheduled to begin after demolition of the original Stargel Stadium was completed in January 2019. Foundation pouring was expected to begin in March, followed by structural erection in May. However, these dates were later pushed back to July and November respectively. The first roof trusses were installed in May 2020, with work continuing during the COVID-19 pandemic.

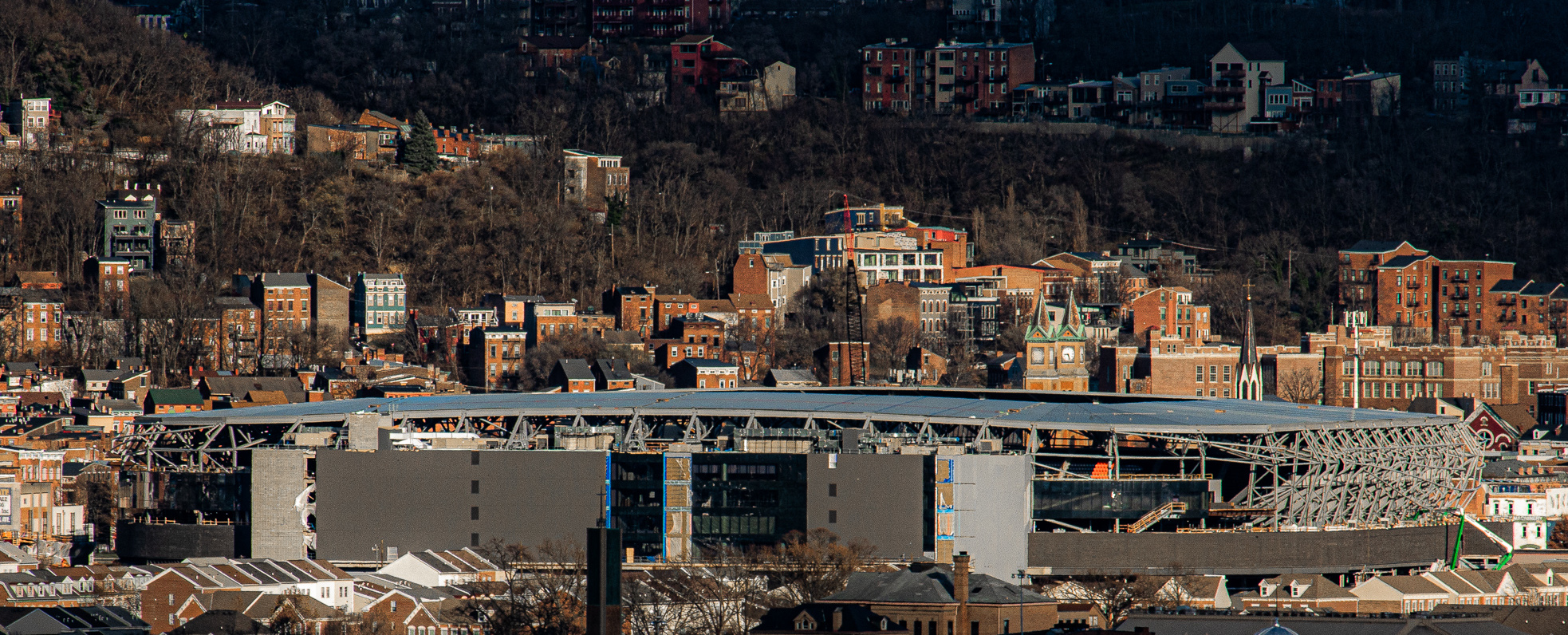
The stadium nearing completion in December 2020

The exterior's structural elements, including the roof and canopy, were topped out in July 2020 with the installation of the final steel beam. Work was halted in early August due to two "racist incidents" involving subcontractors at the stadium site, resulting in mandatory anti-bias training for workers. The north scoreboard is the largest to be used in a soccer-specific stadium, measuring 150 feet (46 m) in width. The stadium's original hybrid grass pitch and its grow lights were installed in January 2021, using grass harvested from a supplier in Brookville, Indiana. The exterior, signage, and interiors were finished in early 2021. A ribbon-cutting ceremony for TQL Stadium was held on May 1, 2021, and the stadium opened the following day to tours for season ticket holders.

TQL Stadium was named Best Venue of 2022 by The World Football Summit.

== Naming rights ==
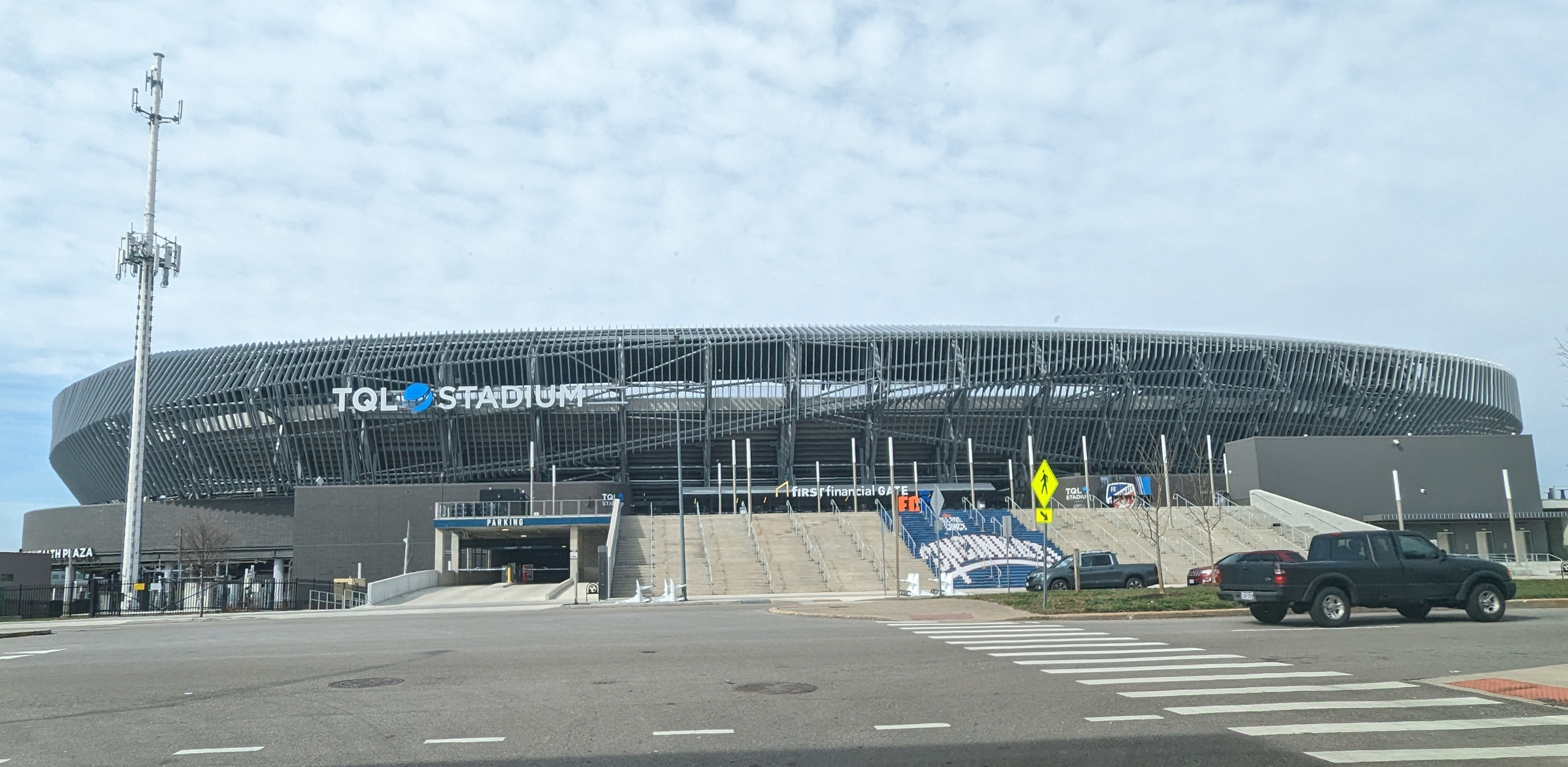
The name "TQL Stadium", seen here on the eastern exterior of the structure, was publicly announced on April 21, 2021.

On June 22, 2020, FC Cincinnati filed suit against Premier Partnerships, a company they had contracted to broker a naming rights deal, alleging negligence amid a push to make a deal with a prospective sponsor on terms that were against MLS rules or financially infeasible for the team. The lawsuit did not mention the prospective sponsor by name, but The Cincinnati Enquirer reported that documents attached to the suit mentioned Mercy Health, the team's jersey sponsor.

On April 21, 2021, Total Quality Logistics (TQL) was named as the naming rights sponsor of the stadium by FC Cincinnati, having come to a long-term agreement with the club.

== Layout and facilities ==
TQL Stadium has a total capacity of 26,000 seats, which includes a safe standing space named "The Bailey" that holds 3,170 spectators. The stadium has 53 suites and four premium areas with club seating for 4,500 spectators. A "speakeasy" bar is planned to be added to the stadium in 2025. The closest seats to the pitch are 15 feet (4.6 m), while the furthest are 130 feet (40 m); The Bailey and the upper deck both have a 34-degree slope. The stadium has six entrances, including a main entrance facing Central Parkway that features a wide "grand staircase" and the East Plaza with 22 entry lanes and open space. TQL Stadium has an overall footprint of 518,000 square feet (48,100 m^{2}) and includes forty restrooms, five player locker rooms, two referee locker rooms, and a team store. The home team's spaces, which comprises a locker room, lounge, coach offices, training suites, and a warm-up area, totals 10,350 square feet (962 m^{2}). The press facilities at the stadium include a press box with capacity for 75 people, three television booths, four radio booths, an auxiliary media booth, and six broadcast truck spots.

The playing field is 115 yards (105 m) long and 75 yards (69 m) wide. It was originally a hybrid grass surface with synthetic turf woven with perennial ryegrass that was installed by The Motz Group. The surface was replaced in 2024 with a natural Bermuda grass surface, named "Tahoma 31", over a sand underlayer. The grass was developed at a turf farm in New Jersey that is also supplying MetLife Stadium for the 2026 FIFA World Cup final.

The stadium and land is owned by the Port of Greater Cincinnati Development Authority, a public agency, and is leased to FC Cincinnati to finance the bonds that were issued in 2018 to cover construction costs. FC Cincinnati announced plans in 2023 to build a mixed-use entertainment district on the north side of TQL Stadium with a hotel, music venue, housing, and restaurants. The first phase of construction, a pair of 13-story towers with housing and a hotel, is scheduled to be completed in 2027. The club also plans to move its headquarters into the district.

== Soccer ==
The first FC Cincinnati match at TQL Stadium was a 3–2 loss to Inter Miami CF played on May 16, 2021, in front of 6,000 spectators. Brek Shea scored the stadium's first goal, for Miami in the seventh minute; the first home goal was scored by Álvaro Barreal in the second half. The capacity of the stadium was reduced to 6,000 for several weeks due to the COVID-19 pandemic; season ticket holders in pods of up to four people were rotated between seats that were distanced apart. The first match at full capacity was played on June 19, 2021, with 25,054 in attendance for a 2–0 loss to the Colorado Rapids. FC Cincinnati's first win at the stadium was on September 11 against Toronto FC, their eleventh match at their new home.

TQL Stadium hosted its first international soccer fixture on September 21, 2021, a friendly match between the United States women's national team and Paraguay. The United States won 8–0 in front of 22,515 spectators. The first match for the United States men's national team was a World Cup qualifier played two months later on November 12 against Mexico that the hosts won 2–0. The stadium hosted a quarterfinal doubleheader for the 2023 CONCACAF Gold Cup on July 9, 2023, with 24,979 spectators watching Jamaica defeat Guatemala and the United States defeating Canada in a penalty shootout.

The stadium hosted four matches during the group stage of the 2025 FIFA Club World Cup, including those of teams like FC Bayern Munich and Borussia Dortmund, the two most successful clubs in Germany.

=== International men's matches ===
Date	Home	Result	Away	Tournament	Spectators
November 12, 2021	United States	2–0	Mexico	2022 FIFA World Cup qualification – CONCACAF third round	26,000
June 1, 2022	United States	3–0	Morocco	Friendly	24,002
July 9, 2023	Guatemala	0–1	Jamaica	2023 CONCACAF Gold Cup Quarterfinals	24,979
July 9, 2023	United States	2–2 (3–2 pen.)	Canada	2023 CONCACAF Gold Cup Quarterfinals	24,979
September 10, 2024	United States	1–1	New Zealand	Friendly	15,711
November 17, 2026	United States	2–0	Haiti	2026–27 CONCACAF Nations League A	24,001

=== International women's matches ===
Date	Home	Result	Away	Tournament	Spectators
September 21, 2021	United States	8–0	Paraguay	Friendly	22,515
September 21, 2023	United States	3–0	South Africa	Friendly	22,016
June 29, 2025	United States	4–0	Republic of Ireland	Friendly	24,016

=== 2025 FIFA Club World Cup ===
Date	Team #1	Result	Team #2	Spectators
June 15, 2025	Bayern Munich (Germany)	10–0	(New Zealand) Auckland City	21,152
June 18, 2025	Pachuca (Mexico)	1–2	(Austria) Red Bull Salzburg	5,282
June 21, 2025	Mamelodi Sundowns (South Africa)	3–4	(Germany) Borussia Dortmund	14,006
June 25, 2025	Borussia Dortmund (Germany)	1–0	(South Korea) Ulsan HD	8,239

== College football ==
TQL Stadium hosted the 129th edition of the Victory Bell matchup between Cincinnati and Miami (OH) on September 19, 2026, marking the first gridiron football event to be held since its opening

== Other events ==
TQL Stadium hosted English rock band The Who on May 15, 2022, as a part of the band's "The Who Hits Back" Tour. It was the band's first concert in the city since the disaster at one of their shows in 1979. The event was the first concert held at the stadium and drew 16,988 spectators.

== Transportation ==
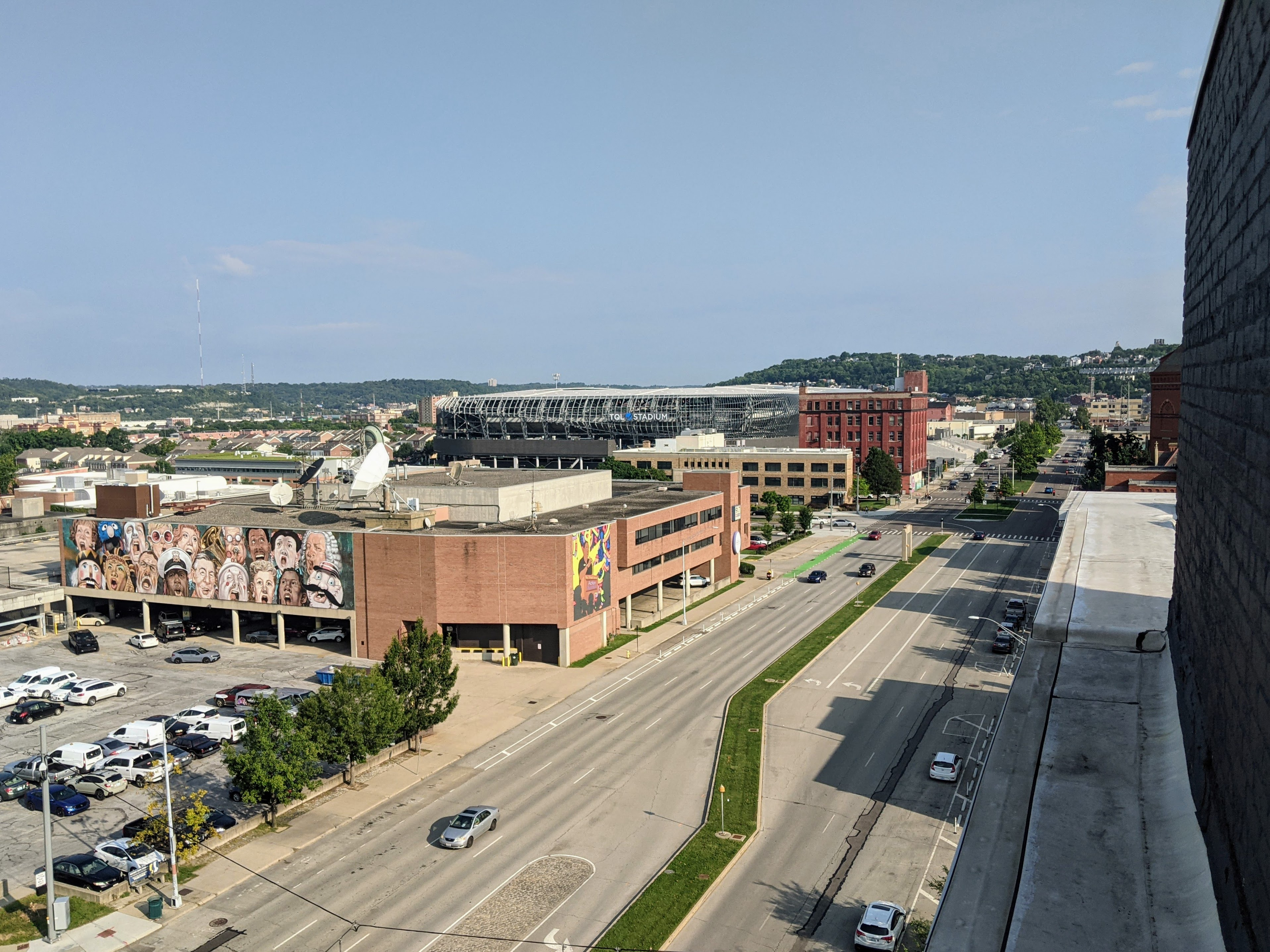
TQL Stadium viewed from across Central Parkway, a major thoroughfare in downtown Cincinnati

The stadium is located along Central Parkway, which splits the West End and Over-the-Rhine neighborhoods just northwest of Downtown Cincinnati, between John and Wade streets. The area is currently served by SORTA buses and is two blocks from a Connector streetcar stop.

During matchdays, several nearby streets are temporarily closed to vehicular traffic to create a pedestrian promenade, subject to city approval. The club has four designated parking areas for fans with season parking passes, as well as several nearby lots with paid rates. The Hamilton County government originally planned to build a 1,000-stall garage to serve TQL Stadium, but later modified its agreement with FC Cincinnati to split the project into two garages, including one that would also serve Findlay Market. The county's 515-stall garage at Findlay Market opened in December 2023 and cost an estimated $18 million to construct.

== See also ==
- Lists of stadiums
- List of soccer stadiums in the United States

Events and tenants
Preceded by Nippert Stadium	Home of FC Cincinnati; 2021 – present	Succeeded by current
