= USS Champlin (DD-104) =

Wickes-class destroyer

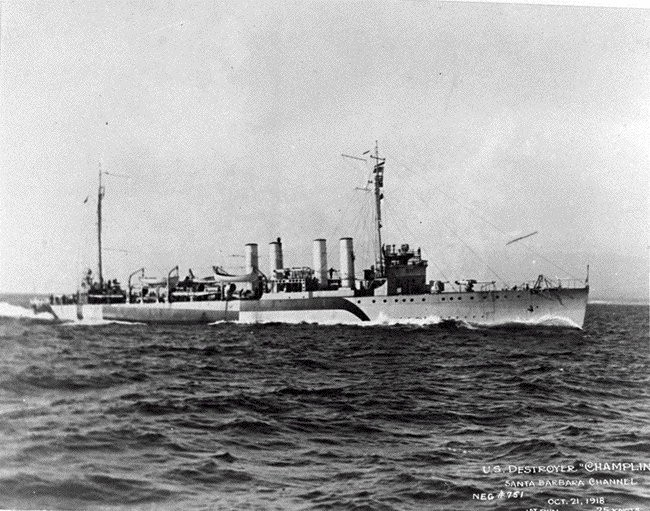
- USS Champlin (DD-104)

History

United States
- Namesake: Stephen Champlin
- Builder: Union Iron Works, San Francisco, California
- Laid down: 31 October 1917
- Launched: 7 April 1918
- Commissioned: 11 November 1918
- Decommissioned: 7 June 1922
- Stricken: 19 May 1936
- Fate: Sunk in tests 12 April 1936

General characteristics
- Class & type: Wickes-class destroyer
- Displacement: 1,202–1,208 long tons (1,221–1,227 t) (standard); 1,295–1,322 long tons (1,316–1,343 t) (deep load)
- Length: 314 ft 4 in (95.8 m)
- Beam: 30 ft 11 in (9.42 m)
- Draught: 9 ft 10 in (3.0 m)
- Installed power: 27,000 shp (20,000 kW); 4 water-tube boilers
- Propulsion: 2 shafts, 2 steam turbines
- Speed: 35 knots (65 km/h; 40 mph) (design)
- Range: 2,500 nautical miles (4,600 km; 2,900 mi) at 20 knots (37 km/h; 23 mph) (design)
- Complement: 6 officers, 108 enlisted men
- Armament: 4 × single 4-inch (102 mm) guns; 2 × single 1-pounder AA guns; 4 × triple 21 inch (533 mm) torpedo tubes; 2 × depth charge rails

USS Champlin (DD-104) was a Wickes-class destroyer built for the United States Navy during World War I.

== Description ==
The Wickes class was an improved and faster version of the preceding Caldwell-class. Two different designs were prepared to the same specification that mainly differed in the turbines and boilers used. The ships built to the Bethlehem Steel design, built in the Fore River and Union Iron Works shipyards, mostly used Yarrow boilers that deteriorated badly during service and were mostly scrapped during the 1930s. The ships displaced 1,202–1,208 long tons (1,221–1,227 t) at standard load and 1,295–1,322 long tons (1,316–1,343 t) at deep load. They had an overall length of 314 feet 4 inches (95.8 m), a beam of 30 feet 11 inches (9.4 m) and a draught of 9 feet 10 inches (3.0 m). They had a crew of 6 officers and 108 enlisted men.

Performance differed radically between the ships of the class, often due to poor workmanship. The Wickes class was powered by two steam turbines, each driving one propeller shaft, using steam provided by four water-tube boilers. The turbines were designed to produce a total of 27,000 shaft horsepower (20,000 kW) intended to reach a speed of 35 knots (65 km/h; 40 mph). The ships carried 225 long tons (229 t) of fuel oil which was intended gave them a range of 2,500 nautical miles (4,600 km; 2,900 mi) at 20 knots (37 km/h; 23 mph).

The ships were armed with four 4-inch (102 mm) guns in single mounts and were fitted with two 1-pounder guns for anti-aircraft defense. Their primary weapon, though, was their torpedo battery of a dozen 21 inch (533 mm) torpedo tubes in four triple mounts. In many ships a shortage of 1-pounders caused them to be replaced by 3-inch (76 mm) anti-aircraft (AA) guns. They also carried a pair of depth charge rails. A "Y-gun" depth charge thrower was added to many ships.

== Construction and career ==
Champlin, named in honor of Stephen Champlin, was launched 7 April 1918 by Union Iron Works, San Francisco, California; sponsored by Miss G. H. Rolph; and commissioned 11 November 1918.

Champlin arrived at Newport, Rhode Island, 12 December 1918 for duty with the Atlantic Fleet. After training operations in the Caribbean, she cleared New York City 19 November 1919 for San Diego, California. Arriving 24 December 1919, she went into reserve with the Pacific Fleet the same day, and cruised on training assignments with a reduced complement until decommissioned 7 June 1922. Laid up at San Diego until her assignment for use in experiments on 19 May 1933, Champlin was sunk in tests 12 August 1936.
