= USS Champlin =

USS Champlin may refer to the following ships of the United States Navy:

- USS Champlin (DD-104), a Wickes-class destroyer launched in 1918 and decommissioned in 1922; sunk in tests 1936
- USS Champlin (DD-601), a Benson-class destroyer launched in 1942 and decommissioned in 1946; scrapped in 1972
