= Stephen Champlin =

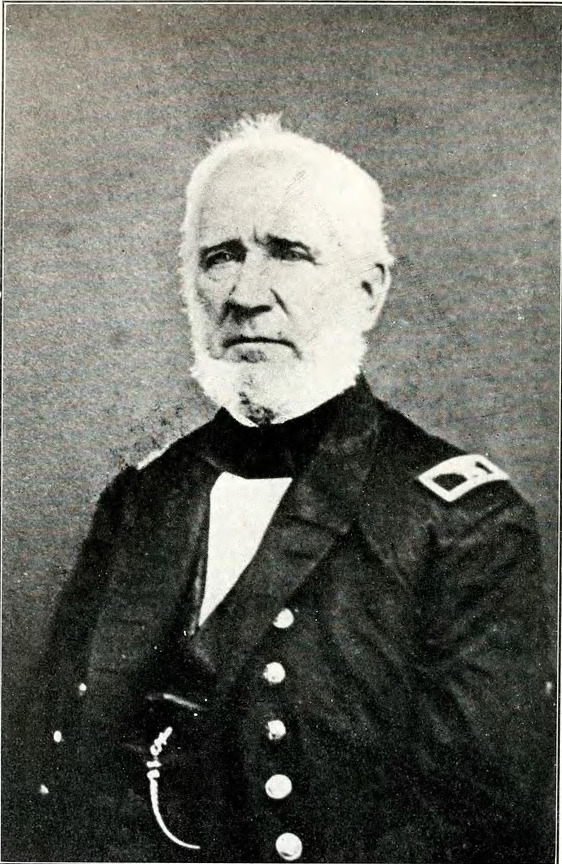
- Born: 17 November 1789; Kingston
- Died: 20 February 1870 (aged 80); Buffalo
- Parent(s): Stephen Champlin; Elizabeth Perry
- Branch: United States Navy

Stephen Champlin (17 November 1789 – 20 February 1870) was an officer in the United States Navy during the War of 1812.

== Biography ==
Born in Kingston, Rhode Island, Champlin entered the Navy as a sailing master 22 May 1812. He commanded the schooner Scorpion in her capture of the British Little Belt during the Battle of Lake Erie, and later in the War of 1812 was wounded when his ship was taken on Lake Huron. Retired in 1855, Captain Champlin was later promoted to Commodore on the retired list, and died in Buffalo, New York and is buried at Forest Lawn Cemetery (Buffalo).

== Legacy ==
Two ships have been named USS Champlin for him, as was Champlin, Minnesota.

== Dates of rank ==
- Sailing master - 22 May 1812
- Lieutenant - 9 December 1814
- Commander - 22 June 1838
- Captain - 4 August 1850
- Captain on Reserved List - 13 September 1855
- Commodore on Retired List - 4 April 1867
