= Summerside, Ohio =

- Census-designated place
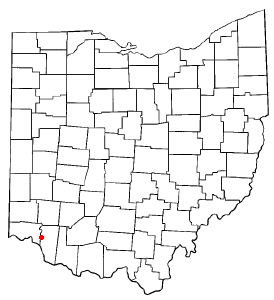
- Location of Summerside, Ohio
- Coordinates: 39°07′25″N 84°16′50″W
- Country: United States
- State: Ohio
- County: Clermont
- Township: Union

Area
  - Total: 2.07 sq mi (5.36 km^{2})
  - Land: 2.06 sq mi (5.34 km^{2})
  - Water: 0.0077 sq mi (0.02 km^{2})
- Elevation: 827 ft (252 m)

Population (2020)
  - Total: 4,941
  - Density: 2,394.3/sq mi (924.44/km^{2})
- Time zone: UTC-5 (Eastern (EST))
  - Summer (DST): UTC-4 (EDT)
- FIPS code: 39-75434
- GNIS feature ID: 2393251

Summerside is a census-designated place (CDP) in Union Township, Clermont County, Ohio, United States. Its population was 4,941 as of the 2020 census.

== History ==
Originally known as "East Mount Carmel", the name of the community was changed around the time a post office was established in August 1887.

== Geography ==
Summerside is located in western Clermont County in the western part of Union Township. It is bordered to the south by Mount Carmel. Ohio State Route 32 forms part of the southern boundary of the CDP, and Interstate 275 forms the eastern boundary, with access to Summerside from Exit 63, where it intersects Route 32. Downtown Cincinnati is 16 miles (26 km) to the west via Route 32 and U.S. Route 50.

According to the United States Census Bureau, the CDP has a total area of 2.1 square miles (5.4 km^{2}), of which 0.008 square miles (0.02 km^{2}), or 0.32%, is water.

== Demographics ==
Historical population
Census	Pop.	Note	%±
2020	4,941		—
U.S. Decennial Census

=== 2020 census ===
As of the 2020 census, Summerside had a population of 4,941. The median age was 38.1 years. 20.8% of residents were under the age of 18 and 16.7% of residents were 65 years of age or older. For every 100 females there were 94.8 males, and for every 100 females age 18 and over there were 89.8 males age 18 and over.

100.0% of residents lived in urban areas, while 0.0% lived in rural areas.

There were 2,137 households in Summerside, of which 26.2% had children under the age of 18 living in them. Of all households, 40.4% were married-couple households, 18.3% were households with a male householder and no spouse or partner present, and 31.0% were households with a female householder and no spouse or partner present. About 31.7% of all households were made up of individuals and 12.9% had someone living alone who was 65 years of age or older.

There were 2,219 housing units, of which 3.7% were vacant. The homeowner vacancy rate was 1.4% and the rental vacancy rate was 5.0%.

Racial composition as of the 2020 census
Race	Number	Percent
White	4,431	89.7%
Black or African American	86	1.7%
American Indian and Alaska Native	14	0.3%
Asian	32	0.6%
Native Hawaiian and Other Pacific Islander	1	0.0%
Some other race	83	1.7%
Two or more races	294	6.0%
Hispanic or Latino (of any race)	191	3.9%

=== 2000 census ===
As of the census of 2000, there were 5,523 people, 2,195 households, and 1,536 families residing in the CDP. The population density was 2,425.2 inhabitants per square mile (936.4/km^{2}). There were 2,277 housing units at an average density of 999.9 per square mile (386.1/km^{2}). The racial makeup of the CDP was 96.13% White, 1.14% African American, 0.25% Native American, 1.01% Asian, 0.45% from other races, and 1.01% from two or more races. Hispanic or Latino of any race were 1.10% of the population.

There were 2,195 households, out of which 36.7% had children under the age of 18 living with them, 53.8% were married couples living together, 12.9% had a female householder with no husband present, and 30.0% were non-families. 24.6% of all households were made up of individuals, and 6.2% had someone living alone who was 65 years of age or older. The average household size was 2.52 and the average family size was 3.02.

In the CDP the population was spread out, with 26.8% under the age of 18, 9.1% from 18 to 24, 34.4% from 25 to 44, 21.0% from 45 to 64, and 8.7% who were 65 years of age or older. The median age was 32 years. For every 100 females there were 91.8 males. For every 100 females aged 18 and over, there were 86.6 males.

The median income for a household in the CDP was $43,138, and the median income for a family was $51,662. Males had a median income of $40,335 versus $26,220 for females. The per capita income for the CDP was $20,190. About 4.3% of families and 6.2% of the population were below the poverty line, including 7.8% of those under age 18 and 6.0% of those age 65 or over.
