= CareStar =

US healthcare corporation

CareStar Inc.
- Formerly: Creative Care
- Company type: Corporation
- Industry: Healthcare
- Founded: 1988
- Founder: Tom Gruber, Rich Lindhurst, Don Brown
- Headquarters: Cincinnati, Ohio, United States
- Area served: Ohio, Kentucky, Indiana, Georgia, Pennsylvania
- Key people: Pamela Zipperer-Davis, President
- Products: Medicaid Ohio Home Care Waiver, Case Management, Specialized Recovery Services, Continued Learning Courses
- Revenue: $66 million USD (2017)
- Number of employees: 545
- Website: "CareStar.com".

CareStar, Inc. (CareStar) is a private, Ohio-based healthcare corporation which provides home and community-based case management services in government, agency and residential operations. CareStar is one of the contracted case management agencies for the Ohio Home Care Waiver Program and HOME Choice through the Ohio Department of Medicaid (ODM). CareStar spends about $2 million a year on health benefits for more than 300 employees and their families.

== History ==
CareStar has provided case management services since 1988 in various mid-western states, predominantly in Ohio and Indiana. In 2004, CareStar signed a five-year, $140 million contract with the Ohio Department of Job and Family Services to provide case management services for its medicaid waiver homecare program. The contract had been renewed multiple times, most recently on June 4, 2009 when it was extended through June, 2011. In a news release, CareStar said it will become the sole statewide provider of home health case management services, overseeing about 11,000 consumers. Starting in 2016, it will just be 1 of 2 choices for the oversight of the Ohio Waiver program under the auspices of Jobs & Family Services. It also will manage a network of more than 6,500 care providers. This number will change with the choice of oversight companies in 2016. The Indiana Home and Hospice Care Foundation is partnered with CareStar Learning (CareStar business venture which offers continuing education for providers) to provide the online testing for its Caregiver Train-the-Trainer program.

CareStar case managers and the Ohio HOME Choice program's providers aim to identify individuals who need person-centered assistance moving into settings that are more suitable to their preferences and needs. Their service provision is designed to help individuals move from qualified institutional setting into their communities by understanding individuals' needs, preferences and barriers to Ohio's long-term care (LTC) system.
