= William A. Champlin =

American politician

Member of the Mississippi House of Representatives from the Harrison County district
- In office 1874–1875

Personal details
- Born: Connecticut
- Children: Zachary T. Champlin

William Aaron Champlin was an American politician. He was a member of the Mississippi House of Representatives, representing Harrison County, from 1874 to 1875.

== Biography ==
William Aaron Champlin was originally from North Stonington, Connecticut. He moved to Harrison County, Mississippi, after the Civil War, and served as its first probate clerk. From 1874 to 1875, he was a member of the Mississippi House of Representatives, representing Harrison County.

== Personal life ==
Champlin was married to Margaret Smith, who was born in Liverpool, England. Their son, Zachary Taylor Champlin, served in the Mississippi State Senate from 1918 to 1920.
