= Springside =

Springside may refer to:

== Australia ==
- Springside, Queensland, a locality in the Toowoomba Region

== Canada ==
- Springside, Saskatchewan, a town

== United Kingdom ==
- Springside, North Ayrshire, a village in Scotland

== United States ==
- Springside (Poughkeepsie, New York), estate of Matthew Vassar with landscaped grounds in Poughkeepsie, New York, U.S.A.
- Springside School, a private all-girls school in Philadelphia, Pennsylvania, U.S.A.
