= Union Township, Clermont County, Ohio =

Township in Ohio, US

- Township
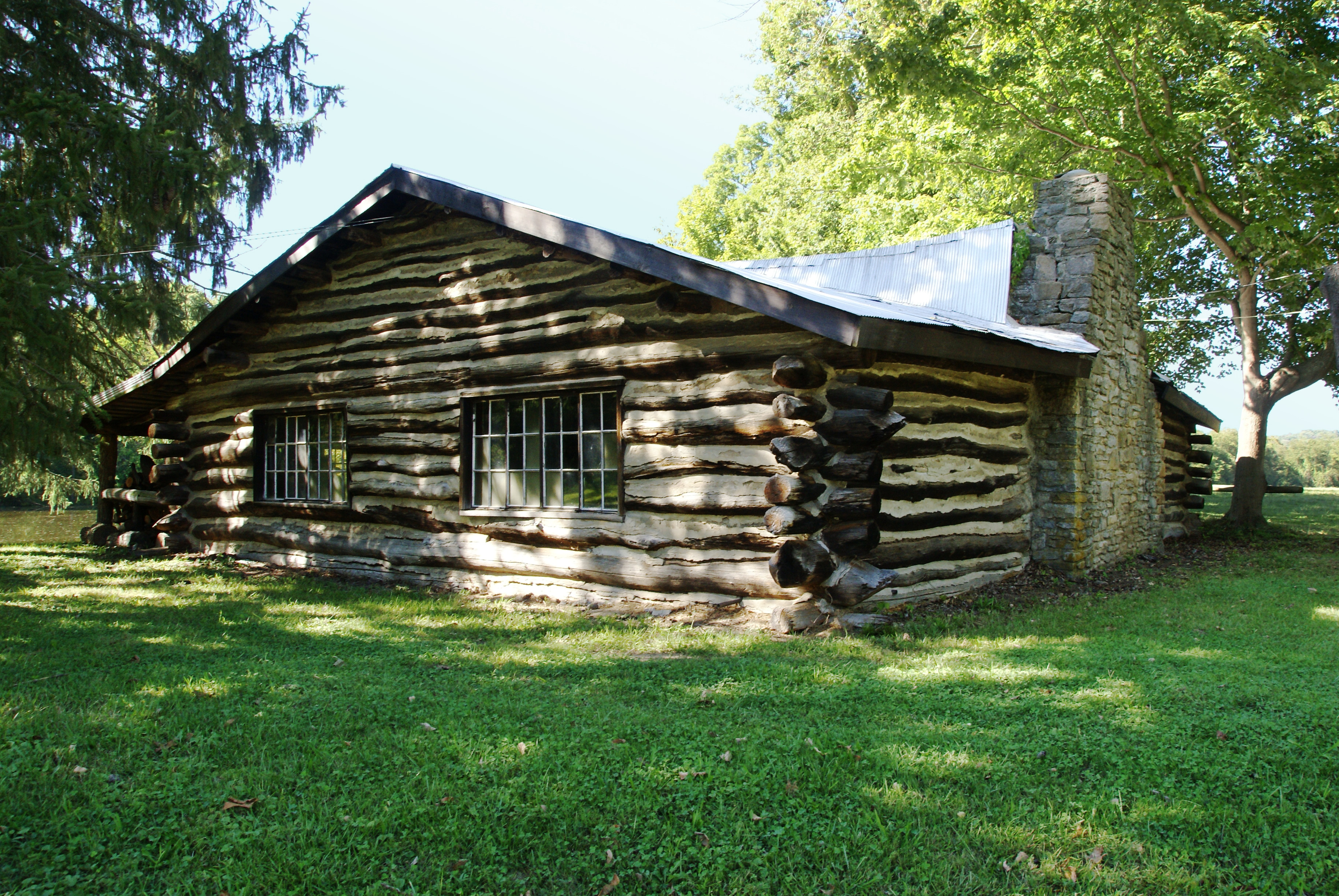
- Pfarr Log House

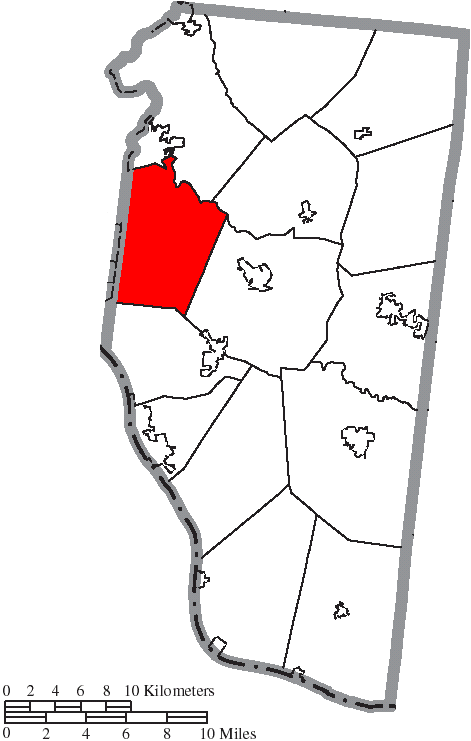
- Location of Union Township in Clermont County
- Coordinates: 39°5′56″N 84°16′29″W
- Country: United States
- State: Ohio
- County: Clermont

Area
  - Total: 29.2 sq mi (75.6 km^{2})
  - Land: 29.0 sq mi (75.1 km^{2})
  - Water: 0.19 sq mi (0.5 km^{2})
- Elevation: 879 ft (268 m)

Population (2020)
  - Total: 49,639
  - Density: 1,601/sq mi (618.2/km^{2})
- Time zone: UTC-5 (Eastern (EST))
  - Summer (DST): UTC-4 (EDT)
- FIPS code: 39-78288
- GNIS feature ID: 1085872
- Website: www.utclermont.gov

Union Township is one of the fourteen townships of Clermont County, Ohio, United States. The population was 49,639 at the 2020 census.

== Geography ==
Located in the western part of the county, it borders the following townships:

- Miami Township - north
- Stonelick Township - northeast
- Batavia Township - east
- Pierce Township - south
- Anderson Township, Hamilton County - west
- Columbia Township, Hamilton County - northwest corner

No municipalities are located in Union Township, although three census-designated places are located in the township:

- Part of Mount Carmel in the west
- Summerside in the northwest
- Part of Withamsville in the south

The township also contains the unincorporated area of Glen Este.

The hamlet of Nine Mile had its own post office (under consecutive postmasters William D. Gaskins, William Holderfield, Charles A. John and George W. Irvin) from 19 April 1880 until September 1905, when mail was directed to New Richmond. One legacy of the former hamlet of Nine Mile is Nine Mile Cemetery.

== Name and history ==
Established in 1811, it is one of 27 Union Townships statewide.

== Economy ==
Total Quality Logistics is headquartered in the township.

== Government ==
The township is governed by a three-member board of trustees, who are elected in November of odd-numbered years to a four-year term beginning on the following January 1. Two are elected in the year after the presidential election and one is elected in the year before it. There is also an elected township fiscal officer, who serves a four-year term beginning on April 1 of the year after the election, which is held in November of the year before the presidential election. Vacancies in the fiscal officership or on the board of trustees are filled by the remaining trustees.

Union Township has a public library, a branch of the Clermont County Public Library.
