= Penn Station (restaurant chain) =

American restaurant chain headquartered in Milford, Ohio

Penn Station Inc.
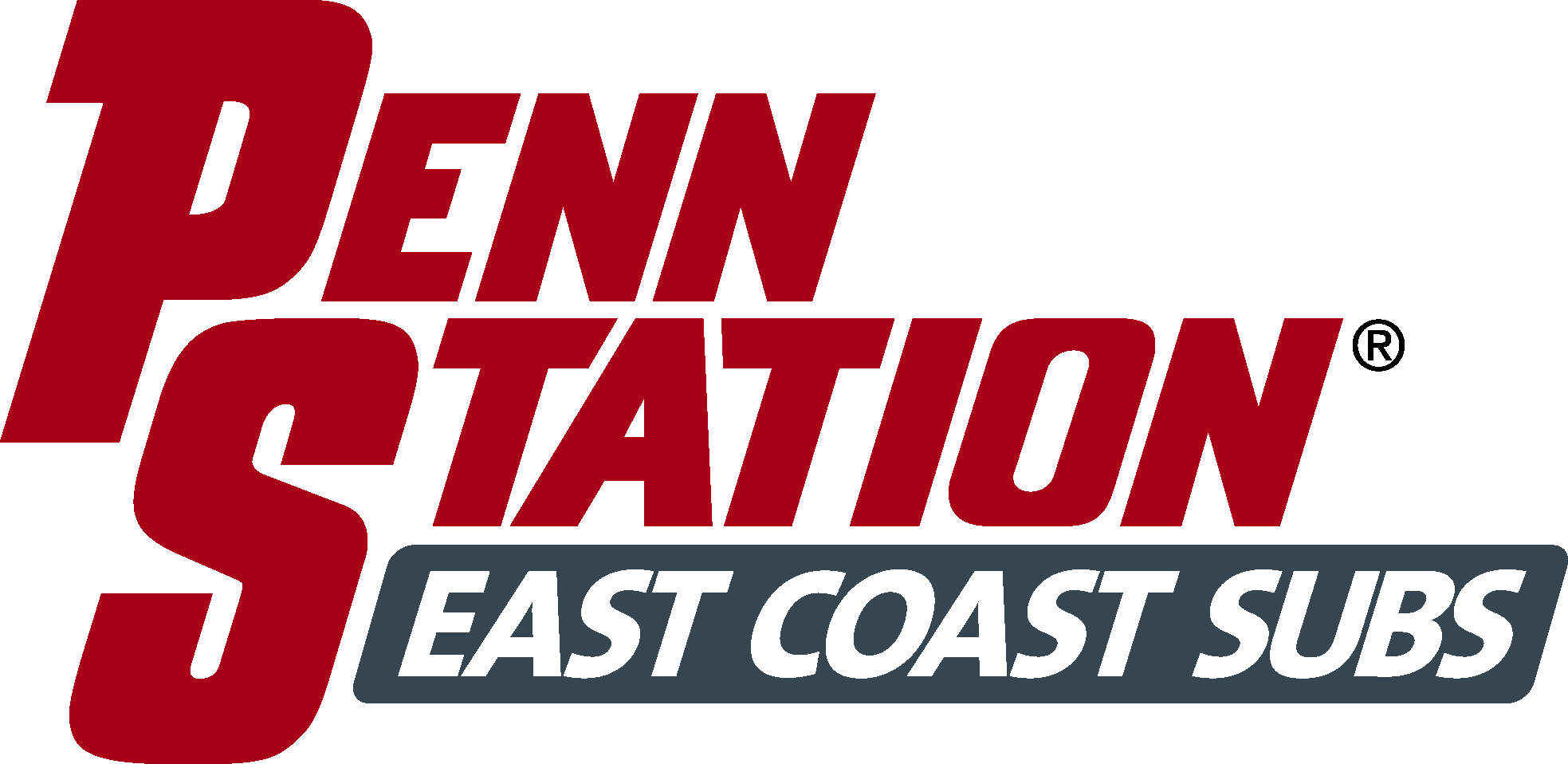

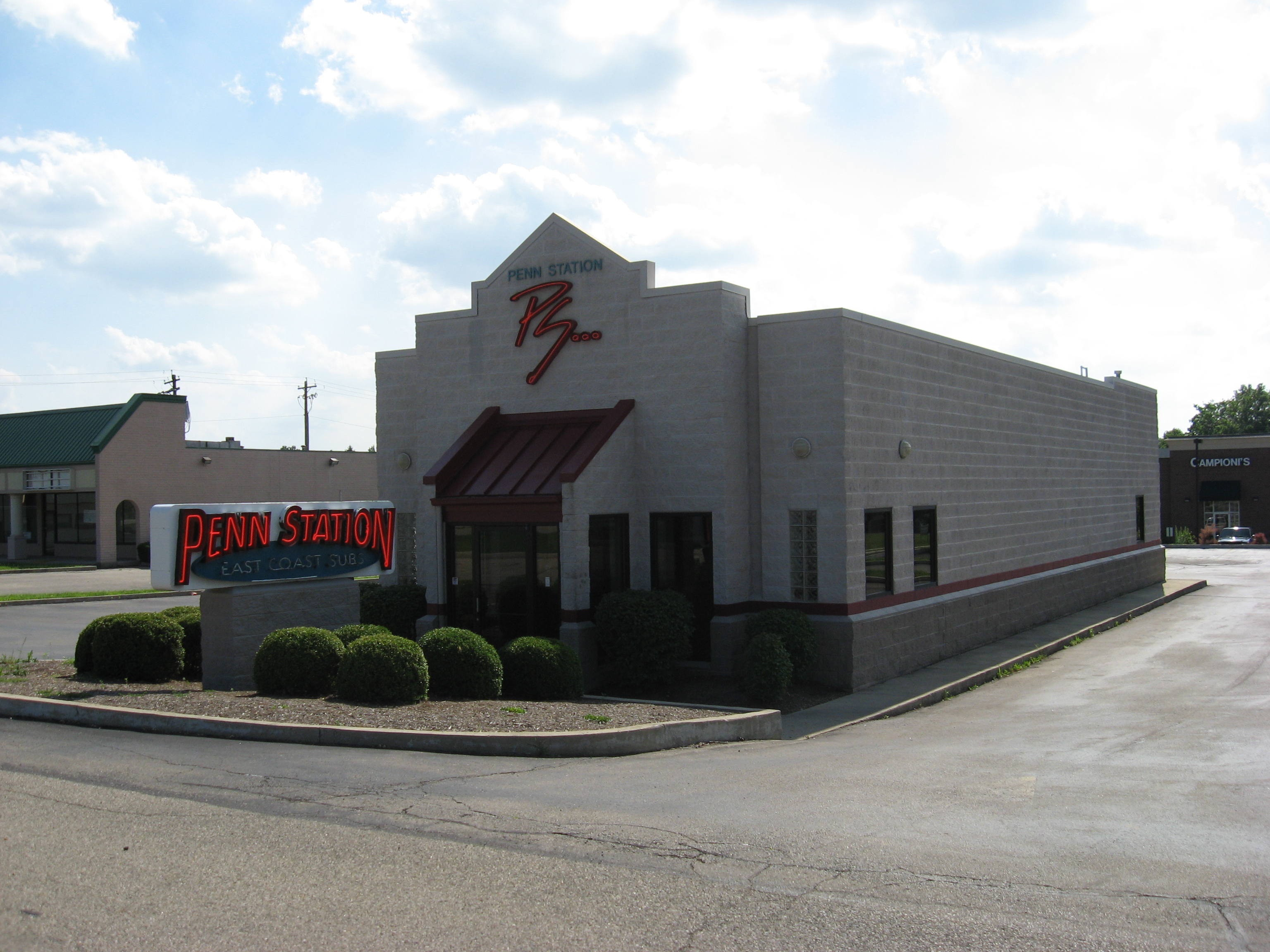
- Penn Station location in Springboro, Ohio
- Trade name: Penn Station East Coast Subs
- Type: Private
- Industry: Restaurant chain
- Genre: Fast casual
- Founded: 1985; 41 years ago in Cincinnati, Ohio
- Founder: Jeff Osterfeld
- Headquarters: Milford, Ohio, United States
- Number of locations: 320
- Area served: United States
- Key people: Jeff Osterfeld (CEO)
- Products: Sandwiches, wraps, salads
- Website: penn-station.com

Penn Station is an American restaurant chain headquartered in Milford, Ohio. It focuses on what it calls "East Coast subs". The first restaurant was opened in 1985 by Jeff Osterfeld in Cincinnati, Ohio. Currently, Penn Station has over 300 locations in 15 states.

Original logo until 2016

== See also ==
- List of submarine sandwich restaurants
