= Mount Carmel, Ohio =

- Census-designated place
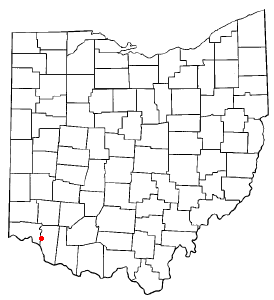
- Location of Mount Carmel, Ohio
- Coordinates: 39°05′52″N 84°17′58″W
- Country: United States
- State: Ohio
- County: Clermont
- Township: Union

Area
  - Total: 1.83 sq mi (4.74 km^{2})
  - Land: 1.83 sq mi (4.74 km^{2})
  - Water: 0.0039 sq mi (0.01 km^{2})
- Elevation: 889 ft (271 m)

Population (2020)
  - Total: 4,828
  - Density: 2,638.7/sq mi (1,018.79/km^{2})
- Time zone: UTC-5 (Eastern (EST))
  - Summer (DST): UTC-4 (EDT)
- FIPS code: 39-52612
- GNIS feature ID: 2393138

Mount Carmel is a census-designated place (CDP) in Union Township, Clermont County, Ohio, United States. The population was 4,828 at the 2020 census.

== History ==
Mt. Carmel is one of the oldest communities in Union Township. In 1788 surveyor John Obannon and his team came in this mostly unsettled area to prepare for building and developing new homes and businesses. It was mostly inhabited by Revolutionary War soldiers. Their property was basically payment for fighting the battles through the Ohio Land Grant. This could have included several hundred acres.

A pioneer from New Jersey, John Rose who was one of the first to settle there in 1796, is actually considered the father of Mt. Carmel. The only historical sign of his presence today is a very small graveyard where he is buried, going down Rose Hill entering Hamilton County. According to one historian, Rose may have picked the name from the Bible.

The Catawba grape industry was a thriving business in the Ohio River Valley because it was hearty enough to withstand the harsh Ohio winters, Farmers in the Mt. Carmel and surrounding area took advantage of this and grape arbors were popping up throughout Union Township contributing to the distinction of the state leading the country in wine production by 1860.

A post office was established in 1887 however it was being built outside the village limits so East Mt Carmel was created so it could take advantage of the benefits. After a few years though the post office was redesignated as Summerside, Ohio. By the twentieth century the Summerside and the nearby Glen Este post offices were both closed and were moved to Newtown, farther west. Recently the Newtown office closed and now the closest post office is on Nagel Road in Anderson Township.

== Geography ==
Mount Carmel is located on the western edge of Union Township. It is bordered on the north by Summerside and on the west by Dry Run in Anderson Township, Hamilton County.

Ohio State Route 32 forms the northern border of Mount Carmel, and Interstate 275 forms the eastern edge. The highways cross at I-275 Exit 63 at the northeast corner of the community. Downtown Cincinnati is 14 miles (23 km) to the west via Route 32, or 19 miles (31 km) via I-275 and I-471. Batavia, the Clermont County seat, is 7 miles (11 km) to the east via Route 32.

According to the United States Census Bureau, the Mount Carmel CDP has a total area of 1.84 square miles (4.76 km^{2}), of which 0.004 square miles (0.01 km^{2}), or 0.11%, is water.

== Demographics ==
Historical population
Census	Pop.	Note	%±
2020	4,828		—
U.S. Decennial Census

=== 2020 census ===
As of the 2020 census, Mount Carmel had a population of 4,828. The median age was 39.2 years. 21.4% of residents were under the age of 18 and 15.3% of residents were 65 years of age or older. For every 100 females there were 96.3 males, and for every 100 females age 18 and over there were 96.9 males age 18 and over.

100.0% of residents lived in urban areas, while 0.0% lived in rural areas.

There were 2,026 households in Mount Carmel, of which 28.6% had children under the age of 18 living in them. Of all households, 42.3% were married-couple households, 22.3% were households with a male householder and no spouse or partner present, and 26.3% were households with a female householder and no spouse or partner present. About 29.3% of all households were made up of individuals and 9.9% had someone living alone who was 65 years of age or older.

There were 2,148 housing units, of which 5.7% were vacant. The homeowner vacancy rate was 2.0% and the rental vacancy rate was 8.6%.

Racial composition as of the 2020 census
Race	Number	Percent
White	4,285	88.8%
Black or African American	76	1.6%
American Indian and Alaska Native	16	0.3%
Asian	51	1.1%
Native Hawaiian and Other Pacific Islander	0	0.0%
Some other race	77	1.6%
Two or more races	323	6.7%
Hispanic or Latino (of any race)	196	4.1%

=== 2000 census ===
As of the census of 2000, there were 4,308 people, 1,702 households, and 1,172 families residing in the CDP. The population density was 2,559.3 inhabitants per square mile (988.2/km^{2}). There were 1,790 housing units at an average density of 1,063.4 per square mile (410.6/km^{2}). The racial makeup of the CDP was 96.80% White, 0.84% African American, 0.21% Native American, 0.30% Asian, 0.65% from other races, and 1.21% from two or more races. Hispanic or Latino of any race were 1.21% of the population.

There were 1,702 households, out of which 34.5% had children under the age of 18 living with them, 51.2% were married couples living together, 12.6% had a female householder with no husband present, and 31.1% were non-families. 25.0% of all households were made up of individuals, and 6.9% had someone living alone who was 65 years of age or older. The average household size was 2.53 and the average family size was 3.04.

In the CDP the population was spread out, with 26.2% under the age of 18, 10.3% from 18 to 24, 32.1% from 25 to 44, 21.2% from 45 to 64, and 10.1% who were 65 years of age or older. The median age was 34 years. For every 100 females there were 98.8 males. For every 100 females age 18 and over, there were 95.7 males.

The median income for a household in the CDP was $36,382, and the median income for a family was $41,996. Males had a median income of $35,904 versus $25,496 for females. The per capita income for the CDP was $17,393. About 8.8% of families and 9.3% of the population were below the poverty line, including 16.7% of those under age 18 and 2.3% of those age 65 or over.
