= Zachary T. Champlin =

American politician (1847–1924)

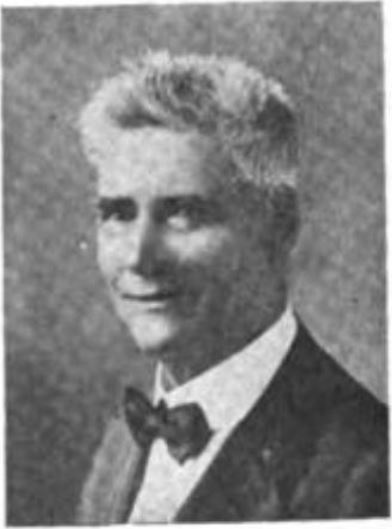
- c. 1917

Member of the Mississippi Senate from the 1st district
- In office January 1918 – January 1920
- Preceded by: Francis M. Johnson

Personal details
- Born: March 28, 1847 Harrison County, MS
- Died: September 15, 1924 (aged 77) Biloxi, Mississippi
- Party: Democrat
- Children: 6
- Parent: William A. Champlin (father)

Zachary Taylor Champlin (March 28, 1847 – September 15, 1924) was a Democratic Mississippi state senator, representing the state's 1st senatorial district from 1918 to 1920.

== Biography ==
Zachary Taylor Champlin was born on March 28, 1847, in Handsboro, Harrison County, Mississippi. He was the son of William Aaron Champlin, a member of the Mississippi House of Representatives from 1874 to 1875, and Margaret (Smith) Champlin, a native of Liverpool, England. Champlin was educated in the private schools of Harrison County. At the age of 15, he enlisted in the Confederate Army in the Civil War.

== Political career and later life ==
Champlin was a justice of the peace from 1888 to 1912. After studying law, he was admitted to the bar in February 1907. He was the Police Justice of Biloxi from 1912 to 1917. After the state's first senatorial district was redistricted, Champlin was elected to represent it, composed of Harrison and Stone Counties, as a Democrat in the Mississippi Senate on February 10, 1917. He died on September 15, 1924, in Biloxi, Mississippi.

== Personal life ==
Champlin was first married to Virginia White, who died before him. He then married Wilhelmina Schulze. Champlin had six children.
