= Total Quality Logistics =

American freight brokerage and third-party logistics firm

- Type: Private
- Industry: Logistics
- Founded: Cincinnati, Ohio (August 1st, 1997)
- Headquarters: Union Township, Clermont County, Ohio, United States
- Number of locations: 60+ offices (2024)
- Key people: Ken Oaks (CEO); Kerry Byrne (President)
- Revenue: $4.1B (2020) $7.8B (2021) $8.8B (2022) $6.7B (2023)
- Number of employees: 9,000+ (April 2024)
- Website: www.tql.com/about-us

Total Quality Logistics (TQL) is a North American freight brokerage and third-party logistics firm. It was founded in 1997 by Ken Oaks in Cincinnati, and is headquartered in nearby Union Township, Clermont County, Ohio, United States. As of 2021, TQL is the largest private company in greater Cincinnati according to the Cincinnati Enquirer and American City Business Journals.

TQL is the world's 19th largest third-party logistics provider (3PL) that provides global transportation services including full truckload (FTL), less-than-truckload (LTL), intermodal, warehousing, drayage, drop trailer, oversize/overweight, Mexico cross-border, customs, Canada cross-border, hazmat, partials and other specialized logistic services.

TQL has been ranked a Greater Cincinnati Best Places to Work 21 times. In 2023, 2019, and 2020, TQL was ranked a Fortune 100 Best Companies to Work For. The company is a five time winner of the Fortune Best Workplaces for Millennials award.

In February 2022, TQL and the Government of Kentucky Economic Development Cabinet announced intentions to create 525 new jobs across the state.

In March 2022, in partnership with the state of Ohio, Lt. Governor Jon Husted, JobsOhio, REDI Cincinnati, Clermont County and Union Township, TQL announced the intention to create 1,000 new jobs in southwest Ohio and expand their headquarters. Also in 2022, The Journal of Commerce ranked TQL the 19th largest Global Third-Party Logistics Provider in their “Top 50 Global 3PLs” Special Report.

== Supply chain crisis response ==
In September 2020, in response to the COVID-19 pandemic, the company pledged $1 million through its Moves That Matter program which covers the cost of transportation of donated freight. The company later upped the commitment to $2 million. The company received recognition from the American Chemistry Council for outstanding COVID-19 response. In 2021, TQL also committed to hiring over 1,000 new employees nationwide in response to the transportation demand that was caused by the pandemic.

In February 2023, TQL was awarded as a finalist for the Engage for Good Halo Awards for "Emergency Crisis/Initiative" for their Moves that Matter charitable program, which moves donated goods at no cost. Other finalists were United Parcel Service; PayPal; Humble Bundle, Razom for Ukraine, International Rescue Committee, International Medical Corps and Direct Relief.

== Headquarters ==
In 2021, the company grew its corporate headquarters in Union Township, Ohio with a $20 million 133,000 square foot expansion. The expansion includes the biggest American flag (30’x60’) and tallest flagpole (160’) in Ohio, Kentucky and Indiana.

== Sponsorships ==
In 2021, the company announced stadium naming rights for TQL Stadium, the home of Major League Soccer's FC Cincinnati.

In 2023, TQL announced a contribution and partnership with University of Cincinnati athletics.

== Lawsuit ==
In March 2026, TQL was ordered to pay $22.5 million in damages to Chelsea Walsh. A jury found that TQL was liable for the death of Walsh's daughter when the company denied Walsh's work from home request during a high-risk pregnancy. A TQL spokesperson expressed condolences for Walsh's loss but disagreed with the court's verdict, feeling facts were mischaracterized during the trial and said the organization was exploring other legal options.
