= MeasureNet Technology Ltd. =

MeasureNet Technology Ltd. is a private, limited liability partnership based in Cincinnati, Ohio manufacturing the MeasureNet System: a brand of network-based electronic data acquisition interface for science teaching laboratories.

MeasureNet networks perform data acquisition tasks using a PC-reducing network-based design that enables users to monitor, collect, store, and disseminate laboratory data, as well as share specified laboratory instruments.

== History ==
The company was founded in 1998 by MeasureNet System inventors Robert Voorhees, Professor Estel Sprague, and Paul McKenzie as a spin-off of their research performed at the University of Cincinnati's Department of Chemistry. MeasureNet's first offices were at the Hamilton County Business Center; an incubator adjacent to Xavier University in Cincinnati's Norwood neighborhood. It has since grown to occupy a building in 2008 shared with a regional administrative center of the U.S. Federal Aviation Administration at 4240 Airport Road. This facility contains rooms for assembly, storage, and administration, as well as a wet laboratory for product development.

MeasureNet's development evolved from the need in the early 1990s to better prepare university chemistry students for the modern workplace or upper-level laboratory that contained a plethora of various electronic data acquisition instruments. Further impetus behind the network-based design evolved from the need to reduce computer maintenance and recurring computer replacement costs associated with personal computer-based interfaces of the time.

Voorhees, Sprague, and McKenzie assembled a small proof-of-concept network in early 1993 in the Chemistry Electronics Shop with the assistance of an internal University of Cincinnati grant. In 1996 the United States National Science Foundation and Procter & Gamble Company funded 10 prototype networks with $190,000 in combined grants for use in the university's freshman chemistry laboratories. Voorhees, McKenzie, and Sprague filed an application for a U.S. patent in August 1996. The first 10 networks of the newly designed system became fully operational for student use in the autumn of 1997. The United States Patent Office then awarded the network a patent (number 5,946,471) in 1999.

== Market ==
An estimated 10,000 students use the system weekly in universities and college science teaching laboratories in the United States and around the world. The company's first major adopter external to the University of Cincinnati was the Chemistry Department at the University of Northern Kentucky. Other Ohio teaching laboratories that employ MeasureNet as of 2008 include Xavier University, Miami University of Ohio, Bowling Green State University-Firelands, Lourdes College, and Mt. Vernon Nazarene College.

In 2003 MeasureNet shipped its first network in the Caribbean to Pontifical Catholic University of Puerto Rico in Ponce and the University of Puerto Rico at Ponce. The United States Department of Commerce honored MeasureNet with an Export Achievement Award in 2007 for its ongoing international expansion.

A number of competitors manufacture PC, handheld, and calculator-based interface systems for academic science laboratories. These include U.S.-based Vernier Software & Technology of Beaverton, Oregon, Pasco of Roseville, California, and Texas Instruments of Dallas, Texas.

== Innovations ==
=== Shared spectroscopy ===
MeasureNet designed its data acquisition networks to each share a single VIS-NIR spectrometer or UV-VIS spectrometer between workstations for emission and absorption spectroscopy experiments. Typical spectrometers normally require a dedicated personal computer.

=== Optical drop counter ===
In 2002 MeasureNet introduced an optical, sealed cell infrared drop counter. This design calculates titration volumes by counting titrant descending through a detector aperture as it breaks an infrared beam. The sealed-cell design protects electronics from the splashes of acids and bases and is an alternative to damage-prone wire-based designs.

=== Multi-function colorimeter ===
The company introduced a multi-function dual-beam colorimeter into teaching laboratories in 2004 for the study of kinetics reactions. The device also enables the study of fluorescence, reflectance, and turbidity with select LED output in the visible, ultraviolet, and infrared ranges. In this dual-beam design, a reference cuvet sits adjacent to a sample cuvet as a split source beams passes through each liquid. The device detects transmittance through each cuvent simultaneously for enhanced data linearity.

== Impacting the environment ==
The State of Ohio Department of Development awarded MeasureNet Technology Ltd. the Governor's Award for Excellence In Energy Efficiency in 2002 for the MeasureNet System's contributions to the environment. Impacts noted included reduced electricity consumption, landfill contamination, and air pollution versus available PC-based data acquisition interfaces for science laboratories.

== Recent developments ==
In an effort to give its data acquisition networks laboratory information management system or "LIMS" functionality, MeasureNet has incorporated the ability for remote storage of student data and live monitoring of acquisitions from within and outside the laboratory.

== See also ==
- Chemical Education
