= Champlin Architecture =

American architectural firm

- Industry: Architecture
- Founded: Cincinnati, Ohio, United States (1978)
- Key people: Michael J. Battoclette; Robert A. Schilling, Jr. Joan Tepe Wurtenberger
- Services: Architecture, Planning, Interior Design, Structural Engineering, Project Administration, Programming, Space Planning, 3D Visualization, Code Analysis
- Website: thinkchamplin.com

Champlin Architecture is an American architectural firm headquartered in Cincinnati, Ohio. The firm has designed buildings in the greater Cincinnati area and in other midwest cities.

== History ==
The firm was originally established by Harry Hake. At the turn of the 20th century, Harry Hake designed buildings such as the Art Deco Cincinnati and Suburban Telephone Company Building, the English Renaissance Queen City Club, and the Greek Revival Western Southern Life Insurance Co. Headquarters. Harry Hake's firm extended through several partnerships and to his son and grandson.

In 1978, upon his grandson's retirement, two associates of the firm, Russ Champlin and Bob Haupt, established Champlin/Haupt Architects Inc.

In 1990, ownership was transferred to Michael J. Battoclette (AIA), Robert A. Schilling Jr. (AIA) and Joan Tepe Wurtenberger (AIA, LEED AP). In 2006, the firm added its 13th principal upon the hiring of Gary Volz (IIDA). In October 2010, Champlin named three new associates: Priya Dhuru, Krutarth Jain and Michael Murphy.

In 2010, Champlin/Haupt Architects Inc. changed its name to Champlin Architecture.

== Notable projects ==
- Mercy Hospital West, Cincinnati, Ohio (in conjunction with AECOM, formerly Ellerbe Becket)
- Sinclair Community College Library, Dayton, Ohio
- Fifth Third Bank City Living and Banking Center, Fountain Square, Cincinnati, Ohio
- Crossroads Community Church, Cincinnati, Ohio
- Calamityville Tactical Laboratory Project Masterplan, Fairborn, Ohio

== Recognition ==
- Modern Healthcare Design Award, September 2012, Citation/Unbuilt Work, Mercy Health - West Hospital
- 3 CDA (Cincinnati Design Awards)
- 2 Cincinnati Magazine Interior Design Awards
- American School and University, November 2009, Architectural Portfolio of Award-Winning & Outstanding Projects, Wright State University, Boonshoft School of Medicine, Dayton, Ohio
