= Ben-Ari =

Ben-Ari (Hebrew: בן-ארי) is a Hebrew name, meaning "son of a lion" or "son of Ari. It may refer to:

- Eyal Ben-Ari (born 1953), Israeli sociologist
- Hanan Ben Ari (born 1988), Israeli singer and musician
- Merav Ben-Ari, Israeli politician
- Michael Ben-Ari (born 1963), Israeli politician, Knesset member with the National Union party
- Miri Ben-Ari (born 1978), Israeli violinist
- Mordechai Ben-Ari, Israeli computer scientist
- Mosh Ben-Ari (born 1970), Israeli musician
- Rafael Ben-Ari (born 1971), Israeli photojournalist
- Shmil Ben Ari, Israeli actor
- Uri Ben-Ari, (born 1925, died 2009), German-born Israel Defence Forces officer
