= Tsilla Hershco =

Israeli historian and political scientist

- Education: Bar-Ilan University (Ph.D., M.A., B.A.)
- Occupations: Historian, political scientist
- Employer(s): Begin–Sadat Center for Strategic Studies, Bar-Ilan University
- Known for: Expertise in France-Israel relations, EU-Israel relations, and the Middle East conflict
- Notable work: Entre Paris et Jérusalem, La France, le Sionisme et la création de l'État d'Israël 1945-1949; Those Who Walk in Darkness Will See the Light: The Jewish French Resistance during the Holocaust and the Creation of Israel, 1940-1949

Dr. Tsilla Hershco is an Israeli historian and political scientist specializing in France-Israel relations, EU-Israel relations, U.S.-France relations, the Middle East conflict, and the history of Jews and Muslims in France. She earned her Ph.D. at Bar-Ilan University and is a senior research associate at the Begin–Sadat Center for Strategic Studies (BESA) at Bar-Ilan University. She is also a Spiegel Fellow at the Center of Holocaust Research at Bar-Ilan University and a member of the Committee to Recognize the Heroism of Jewish Rescuers During the Holocaust (JRJ).

== Career ==
=== Academic Background ===
Dr. Tsilla Hershco earned her Ph.D. in History from Bar-Ilan University in 1996. She also holds an M.A. in History (1987) and a B.A. in History and English Literature (1974) from the same institution, where she also obtained a Teaching Diploma in 1974.

=== Professional Roles ===
Dr. Hershco has held several academic and research positions throughout her career. She has been a Senior Research Associate at the Begin–Sadat Center for Strategic Studies (BESA) at Bar-Ilan University since 2003. Additionally, she is a Spiegel Fellow at the Center of Holocaust Research at Bar-Ilan University and has served as a lecturer at various educational institutions, including Bar-Ilan University and its Academic Branch "Emek Hayarden" from 1998 to 2006. Earlier in her career, she was a researcher at the Center for Defence Studies, Yad Tavenkin, Ramat Efal, from 1996 to 2001.

=== Research Interests ===
Dr. Hershco's research includes France-Israel relations, EU-Israel relations, U.S.-France relations, and the Middle East conflict. She also studies the history of Jews and Muslims in France and has conducted research on the Holocaust, focusing on Jewish resistance in France during World War II.

=== Notable Achievements ===
Dr. Hershco has published several books, including Entre Paris et Jérusalem, La France, le Sionisme et la création de l'État d'Israël 1945-1949 and Those Who Walk in Darkness Will See the Light: The Jewish French Resistance during the Holocaust and the Creation of Israel, 1940-1949. She has authored numerous research publications and articles on topics such as Israel-France defense cooperation, French policy during the Second Intifada, and the Jewish resistance in France.

== Publications ==
=== Books ===
- Entre Paris et Jérusalem, La France, le Sionisme et la création de l'État d'Israël 1945-1949 (Between Paris and Jerusalem, France, Zionism and the creation of the State of Israel 1945-1949)
- Those Who Walk in Darkness Will See the Light: The Jewish French Resistance during the Holocaust and the Creation of Israel, 1940-1949, Israel Galili Center, 2003 (Hebrew)

=== BESA Research Publications ===
- Israel-France Defense and Security Cooperation in the 21st Century, Mideast Security and Policy Studies No. 81, Summary, January 2014
- Israel-France Defense and Security Cooperation in the 21st Century, Mideast Security and Policy Studies No. 101, July 2013 (Hebrew, 77pp)
- France and the crisis in Lebanon: July 2006 – July 2008, Mideast Security and Policy Studies No. 81, July 2009
- French Policy regarding the Israeli-Arab conflict during the second Intifada, 2000–2005, Mideast Security and Policy Studies No. 68, July 2006

=== Articles ===
1. The Jewish Resistance in France

- Tsilla Hershco, "Women in the Jewish Resistance in France", in: Judith Tydor Baumel and Alan Schneider (eds), All Our Brothers and Sisters, Jews Saving Jews During the Holocaust, Peter Lang, Bern, Berlin, Bruxelles, New York, Oxford, April 2020, pp. 155–168.
- Tsilla Hershco, "It is Time to Recognize the Contribution of the Jewish Resistance in the Rescue of Jews in France", BESA Perspectives Paper, No. 1719, August 30, 2020.
- Tsilla Hershco, "The French Jewish Community and the Memory of the Jewish Resistance in France (1940-2006)", in: Erik Cohen (ed.), French Jewry Between Particularism and Universalism, Modern and Contemporary History, Dahan Center, Bar-Ilan University, June 2015, pp. 75–94 (Hebrew).
- Tsilla Hershco, "Zionism in France during the Holocaust and the Creation of Israel: 1940-1948", in: Alon Gal (ed.), World Regional Zionism, Geo-Cultural Dimensions, Vol III, Zalman Shazar Center for Jewish History, 2010, pp. 93–110 (Hebrew).
- Tsilla Hershco, "La France, la Shoah et la Création de l'État d'Israël", Controverses No. 7, May 2008, pp. 117–140.
- Tsilla Hershco, "The Jewish Resistance in France during WWII: the Gap Between History and Memory", Jewish Political Studies Review 19:1-2, 2007, pp. 49–57.
- Préface aux Réseaux de la Résistance juive en France, Organisation juive de combat, Résistance/sauvetage France 1940-1945, autrement, 2002, pp. 37–41, 117–121, 171–175, 231–233, 245–250, 375–378, 407–408, 415–416.

2. Israel-France - the EU

- Tsilla Hershco, "Macron vs. Radical Political Islam in France: A War of Civilization?", BESA Center Perspectives Paper, No. 1803, November 6, 2020.
- Tsilla Hershco, "Can France Bring Stability to Crisis-Plagued Lebanon?", BESA Center Perspectives Paper No. 1746, September 14, 2020.
- Tsilla Hershco, "The EU and the Coronavirus Pandemic", BESA Center Perspectives Paper, No. 1515, April 1, 2020.
- Tsilla Hershco, "Contradictions in France’s Fight Against Antisemitic Violence", BESA Center Perspectives Paper No. 1485, March 16, 2020.
- Tsilla Hershco, "France and the Urban Guerilla Warfare of the Black Blocs", BESA Center Perspectives Paper No. 1180, May 22, 2019.
- Tsilla Hershco, "The Yellow Vests in France: Social Protest, Violence and anti-Semitism", BESA Center Perspectives Paper No. 1099, February 28, 2019.
- Tsilla Hershco, "France’s fight against Islamic Radicalization, the Writing is Still on the Wall", BESA Center Perspectives Paper, No. 967, October 5, 2018.
- Tsilla Hershco, "Macron’s Proactive Position on Iran: Dialogue vs. Sanctions", BESA Center Perspectives Paper, No. 775, March 20, 2018.
- Tsilla Hershco, "The Impact of the ISIS Terror Attacks on Europe", BESA Center Perspectives Paper, No. 456, April 30, 2017.
- Tsilla Hershco, "Israel-EU security and defense relations in the context of the ‘Arab Spring’", in: The EU, Israel and the "Arab Spring" Beyond the Status Quo?, Centre de Recherche Français de Jérusalem, CNRS, Bulletin du CRFJ, No. 25, January 31, 2015.
- Tsilla Hershco, "Jews and Muslims in France in Light of French Mideast Policy", in: Bernard Dov Cooperman and Zvi Zohar (eds.), Jews and Muslims, Dahan Center, Bar Ilan University, Maryland University, 2013, pp. 185–207.
- Tsilla Hershco, "After Toulouse: combating Anti-Semitism in France", BESA Perspectives Papers, No. 169, April 2012.
- The French diplomacy during the war of Independence: 1947–1949, Yad Israel Galili, Military History Society, Tel Aviv University, Defense Ministry editions, 2008, pp. 344–368 (Hebrew)
- Netanyahu and Sarkozy, Personal Chemistry versus Political Disagreements, BESA Perspective Papers, No. 82, June 22, 2009.
- France, the EU Presidency and Implications for the Middle East Conflict, The Israel Journal of Foreign Affairs, Vol. 3, No. 2, July 19, 2009, pp. 63–73.
- Sarkozy's Policy in the Middle East: A break with the past?, Insight Turkey, Vol. 11, No. 2, April–June 2009, pp. 75–91.
- Sarkozy in Syria: Discrepancies in French Mideast Policy, BESA Perspective Papers, No. 48, September 10, 2008.
- Sarkozy's Presidency, BESA Perspective Papers, No. 46, June 22, 2008.
- La France, la Shoah et la création de l'État d'Israël, 1945–1949, Controverses, No. 7, May 2008, pp. 117–140.
- France, the EU and the Middle-East in Sarkozy Era, Perspective paper, No. 39, February 27, 2008.
- French and the Partition Plan: 1947–1948, Israel Affairs, Vol. 14, No. 3, 2008, pp. 486–498.
- The French presidential elections of May 2007: Implications for French Israeli relations, Perspectives papers, No. 29, May 13, 2007.
- Les relations franco-israéliennes 2000-2007: Quel bilan?, Middle-East Review of International Affairs, No. 1, May 2007.
- Les Institutions Françaises à Jérusalem: 1947-1949, in: Dominique Trimbur and Ran Aaronsohn (eds.), De Balfour à Ben Gourion, Les Puissances Européennes et la Palestine, Le Centre de Recherche Français de Jérusalem, Editions CNRS, 2008, pp. 407–434.
- The Jewish Resistance in France during WWII: the gap between history and Memory, Jewish Political Studies Review, Vol. 19, No. 1–2, 2007, pp. 49–57.
- Le Grand Mufti de Jérusalem en France, Histoire d'une évasion, Controverses, No. 1, March 2006, pp. 244–273.
- French perceptions of the Middle-East, Besa Perspective, No. 6, May 22, 2005.

=== Press Articles ===
- Sarkozy n'est pas devenu sioniste (Sarkozy hasn't become Zionist), The Jerusalem Post, January 21, 2009.
- Sur le fond de divergences persistent avec Sarkozy, interview on lci.fr, June 21, 2008.
- יהודים השתתפו בשחרור (Jews participated in the liberation), Haaretz, August 26, 2004.
- Are these demons old or new?, Haaretz, June 11, 2004.
- Jewish Holocaust heroes and heroines honored in Paris, The Jerusalem Post, February 14, 2014.

=== Videos ===
- Boys and Girls, Who Rescued Jews in the Framework of the Jewish Resistance in France, Spiegel Fellows conference, September 30, 2020.
- André Chouraqui dans la Résistance Juive en France, (20 min), November 23, 2017.
- Hésitations Françaises sur la Reconnaissance de l'État d'Israël, conference, May 2008.
- La mémoire de la Shoah et de résistance en Algérie à travers l'histoire de la famille Belz, Judaisme du Maghreb conference, Université de Paris I - Sorbonne - Université Bar Ilan, June 2010.
