= Uzi Rubin =

Israeli defense engineer (born 1937)

- עוזי רובין
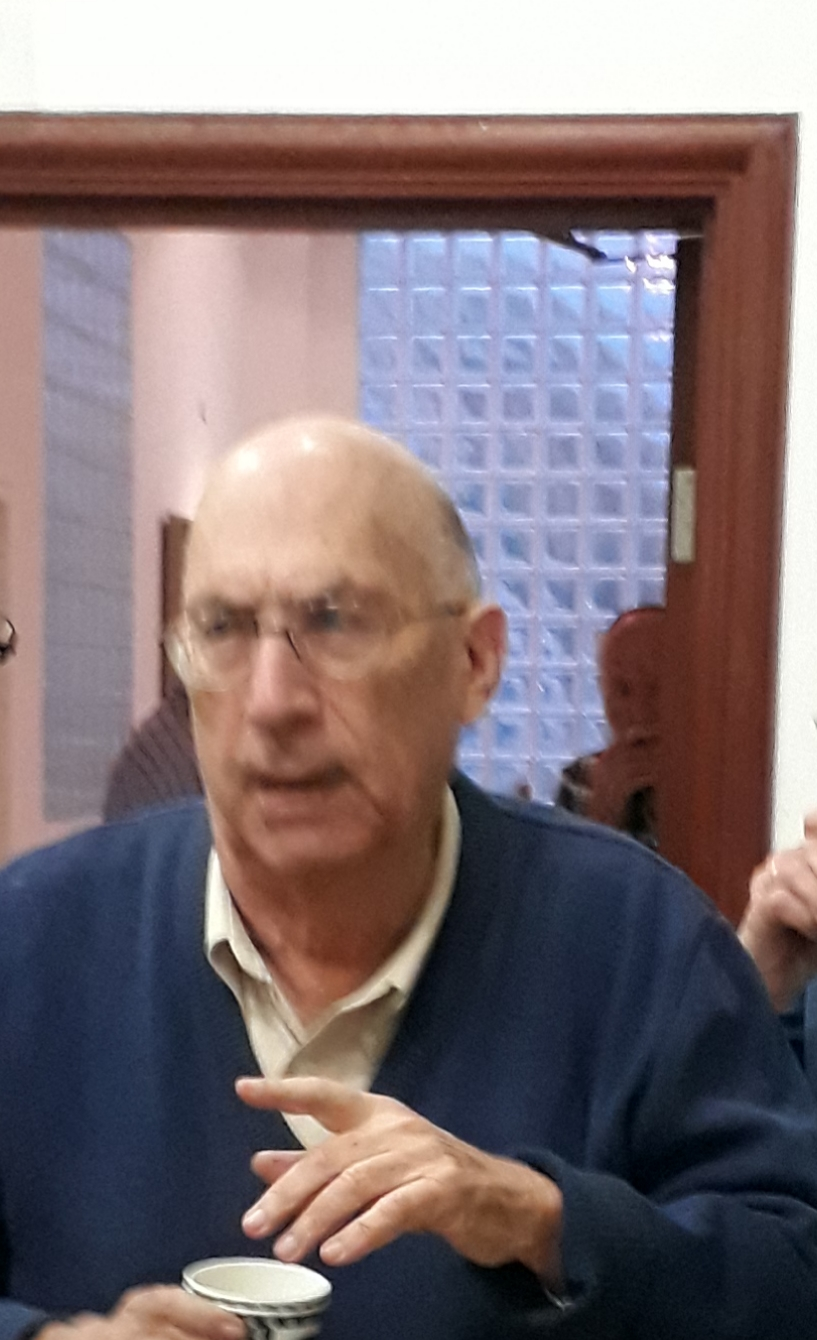
- Born: 1937 (age 88–89)
- Occupations: Defense engineer, Analyst
- Known for: Development of Israel's Arrow anti-missile defense system
- Awards: Israel Defense Prize (1996)

Uzi Rubin (Hebrew: עוזי רובין; born 1937) is an Israeli defense engineer and analyst.

== Defense industry involvement ==
Uzi Rubin has been involved in Israeli military research, development, and engineering programs for almost forty years. Between 1991 and 1999, he served as head of Israel's Missile Defense Organization, and in that capacity he oversaw the development of Israel's Arrow anti-missile defense system. He was awarded the Israel Defense Prize in 1996. He is a fellow of the Begin-Sadat Center for Strategic Studies at Bar Ilan University.

== See also ==
- Jerusalem Institute for Strategy and Security
