= Moshe Dayan Center for Middle Eastern and African Studies =

Israeli think tank

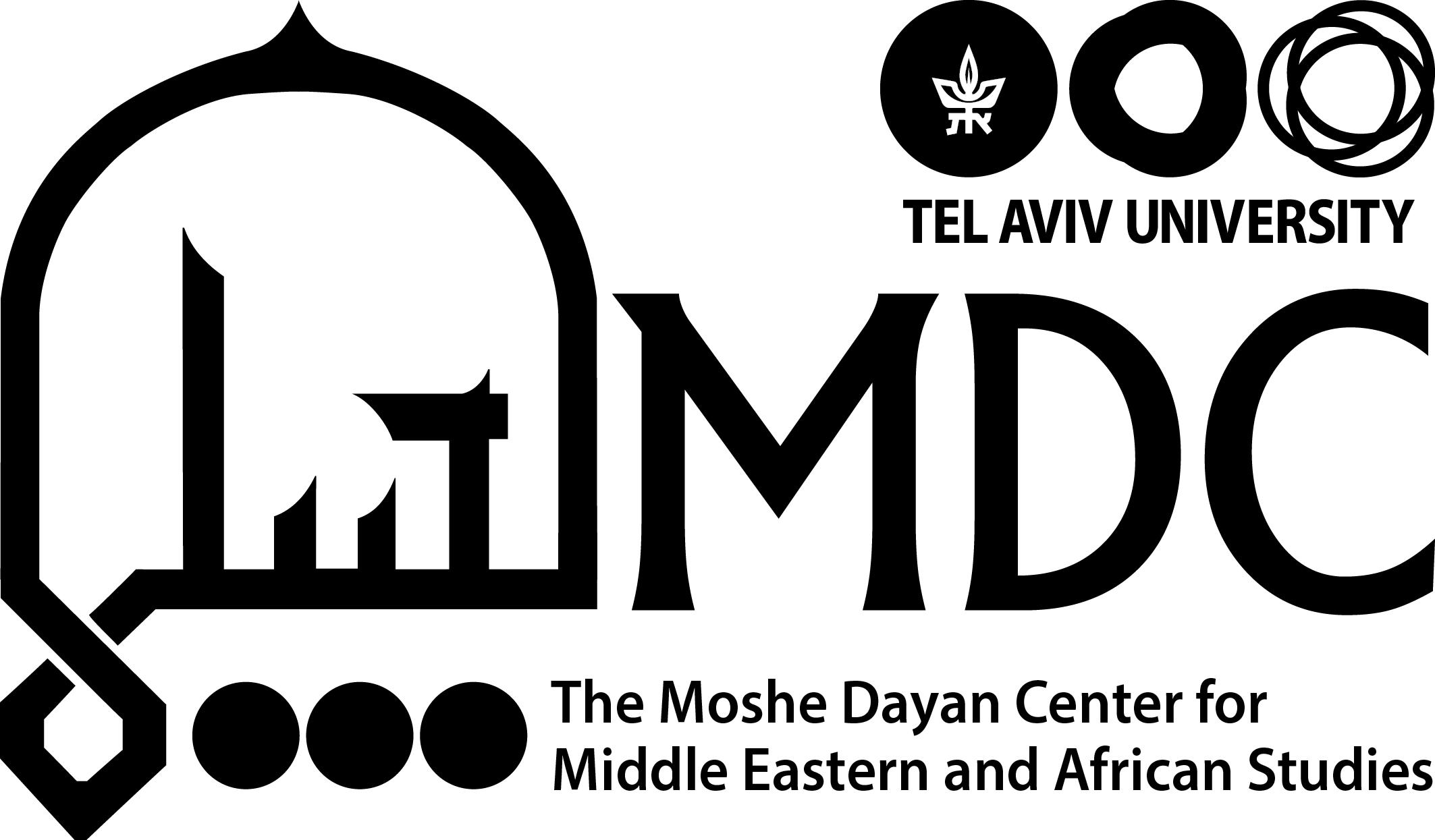
- Predecessor: Reuven Shiloah Institute
- Formation: 1966 (as the Reuven Shiloah Institute); 1983 (as the MDC)
- Headquarters: Tel Aviv, Israel
- Executive Director: Amos Nadan
- Parent organization: Tel Aviv University
- Website: dayan.org

The Moshe Dayan Center for Middle Eastern and African Studies is an Israeli think tank based in Tel Aviv, Israel, focused on the contemporary study and analysis of the Middle East and Africa. Its stated primary mission is to serve as a resource for decision makers and the public at large, both in Israel and internationally, though it differentiates itself from other similar organizations by refraining from recommending specific policies outright.

The Moshe Dayan Center’s team of over thirty researchers comes from a variety of backgrounds and disciplines, and collectively possesses a command of English, Hebrew, Arabic, Turkish, Kurdish, and Persian. In the wake of the 2011 ‘Arab Spring,’ and the effective collapse of many Middle Eastern states, the center has been active in developing new interpretive frameworks for understanding the region’s complex dynamics.

== History ==
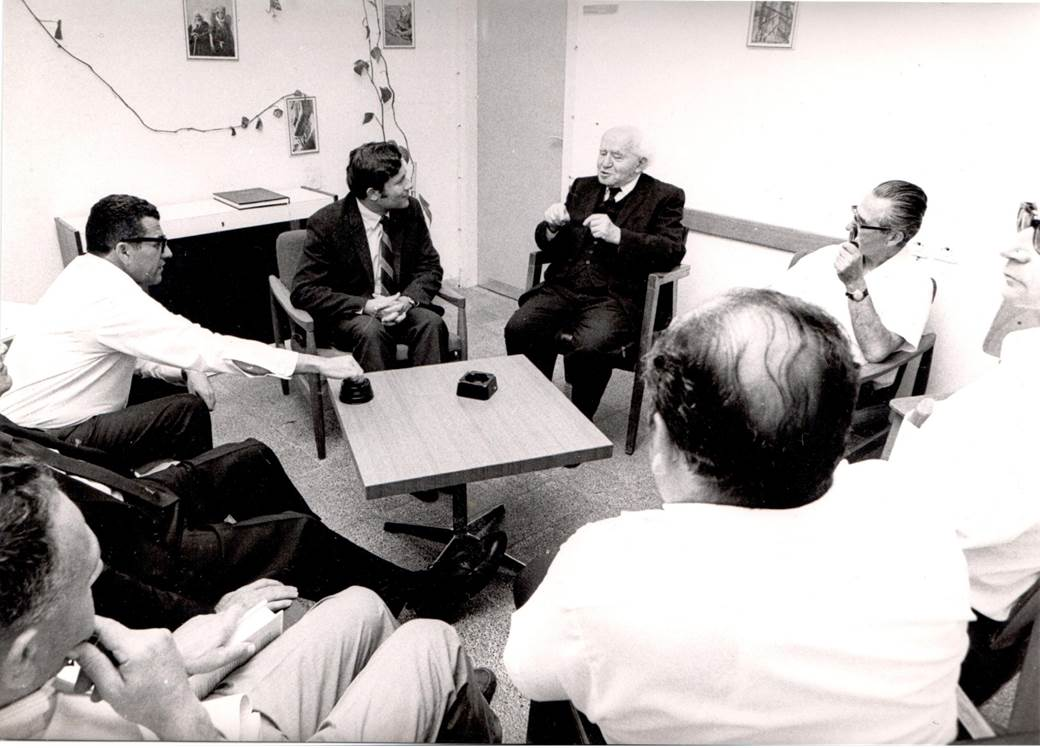
David Ben-Gurion addresses members of the Reuven Shiloah Institute. Date unknown.

The idea for the Center was proposed by Reuven Shiloah, the first director of the Mossad, who wished to create in Israel an organization along the lines of the Chatham House in Great Britain. Following Shiloah's death, Teddy Kollek, then director-general of the Prime Minister's Office (and later the Mayor of Jerusalem), suggested that the new institution bear Shiloah's name. In the early days, the Institute operated in close cooperation with the Defense Ministry, the Israeli Foreign Ministry, and the Israel Oriental Society. It was staffed by a combination of career researchers, often from the defense establishment but with no academic credentials, and doctoral candidates affiliated with the Hebrew University. Initially, it engaged in much classified research. During this time, it developed a "reputation for thoroughness and quasi-academic quality." David Ben-Gurion reportedly turned to the Shiloah Institute in the late 1950s to research and gather material about the Palestinian exodus of 1948;

In 1964, after the establishment of Tel Aviv University, one of researchers, Shimon Shamir, proposed that the institute operate under the university's aegis. The institute possessed a large archive, which would be valuable to researchers, and association with the university would ensure proper funding.

As part of Tel Aviv University, it became what Prof. Gil Eyal of Columbia University called a "liminal institutional setting between the academy and officialdom," often working closely in tandem with military intelligence officers and "organizing conferences and panel discussions on topical issues of the day, to which they invited military intelligence officers, state officials, journalists, and politicians."

In 1983, the university established the Moshe Dayan Center, which combined the Shiloah Institute and other documentation units dealing with the Middle East. In its present incarnation, the Moshe Dayan Center no longer has ties with the Israeli intelligence establishment.

== Activities ==
The Moshe Dayan Center publishes eight analytical publications on a monthly or semi-monthly basis, each dealing with a particular facet of the contemporary Middle East. Additionally, it publishes several books annually under its own imprint, and frequently sponsors symposiums, events, and public lectures. The center maintains its own specialist library housing an extensive collection of journals, articles, archival materials (including the British Archive's Archive Editions), economic source and statistical data, and other reference materials.

The center's Arabic press archives includes more than one thousand reels of microfilmed newspapers, the first of which appeared in 1877, as well as a hard-copy collection containing more than 6,000 newspapers, magazines and periodicals from all over the Middle East.

The center also runs a workshop for university faculty whose work revolves around Israel and the Middle East. The workshop is a ten-day seminar on the geopolitics of Israel and its neighbors, and the history of the region and its significance in contemporary world affairs.

The Reuven Shiloah Institute, and later the Moshe Dayan Center, was notable for its publication of the now-defunct Middle East Contemporary Survey, itself a descendant of the earlier Middle East Record, which was reviewed as "the most comprehensive and authoritative annual review of developments in the Middle East."

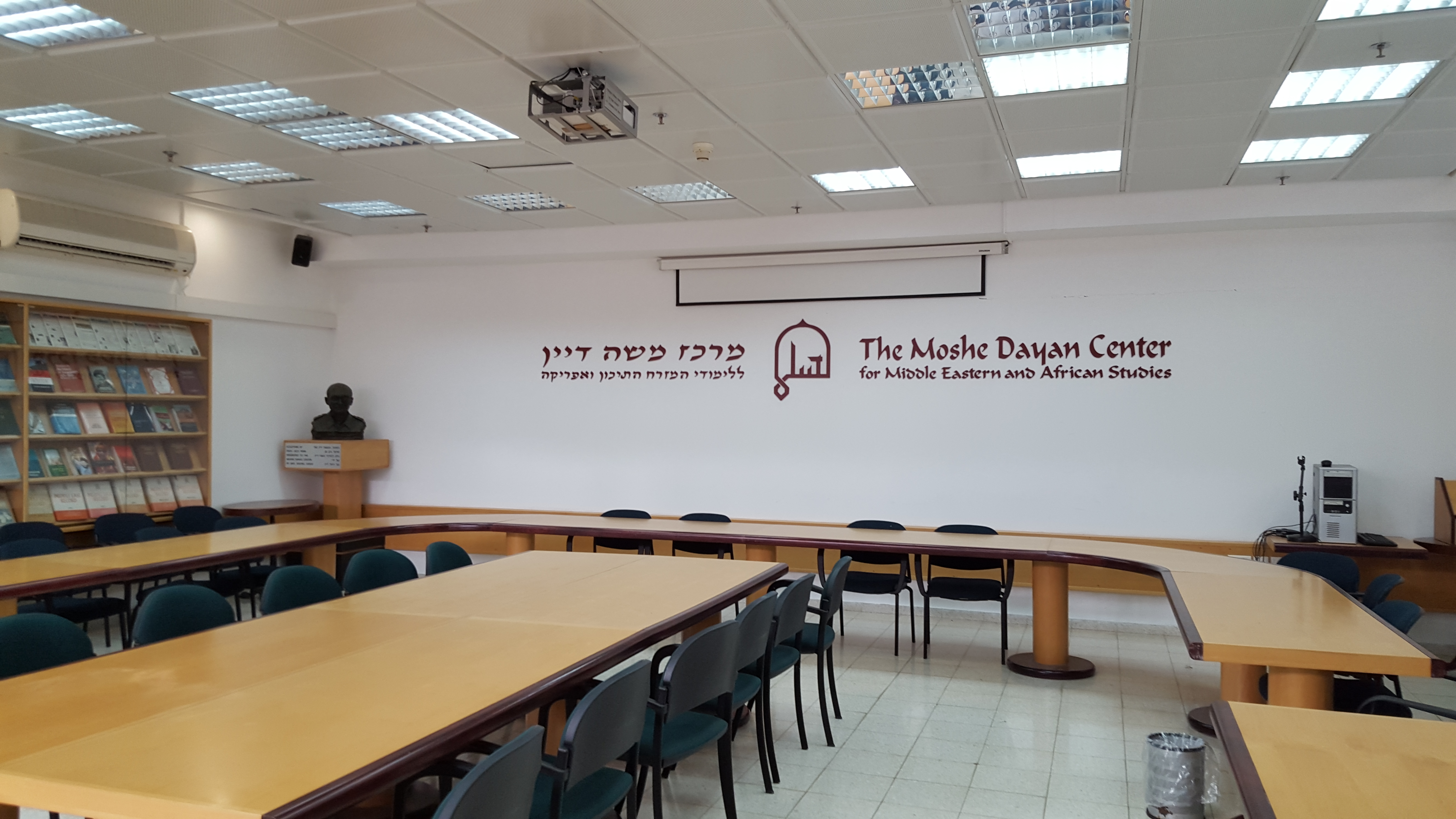
The MDC for Middle Eastern and African Studies

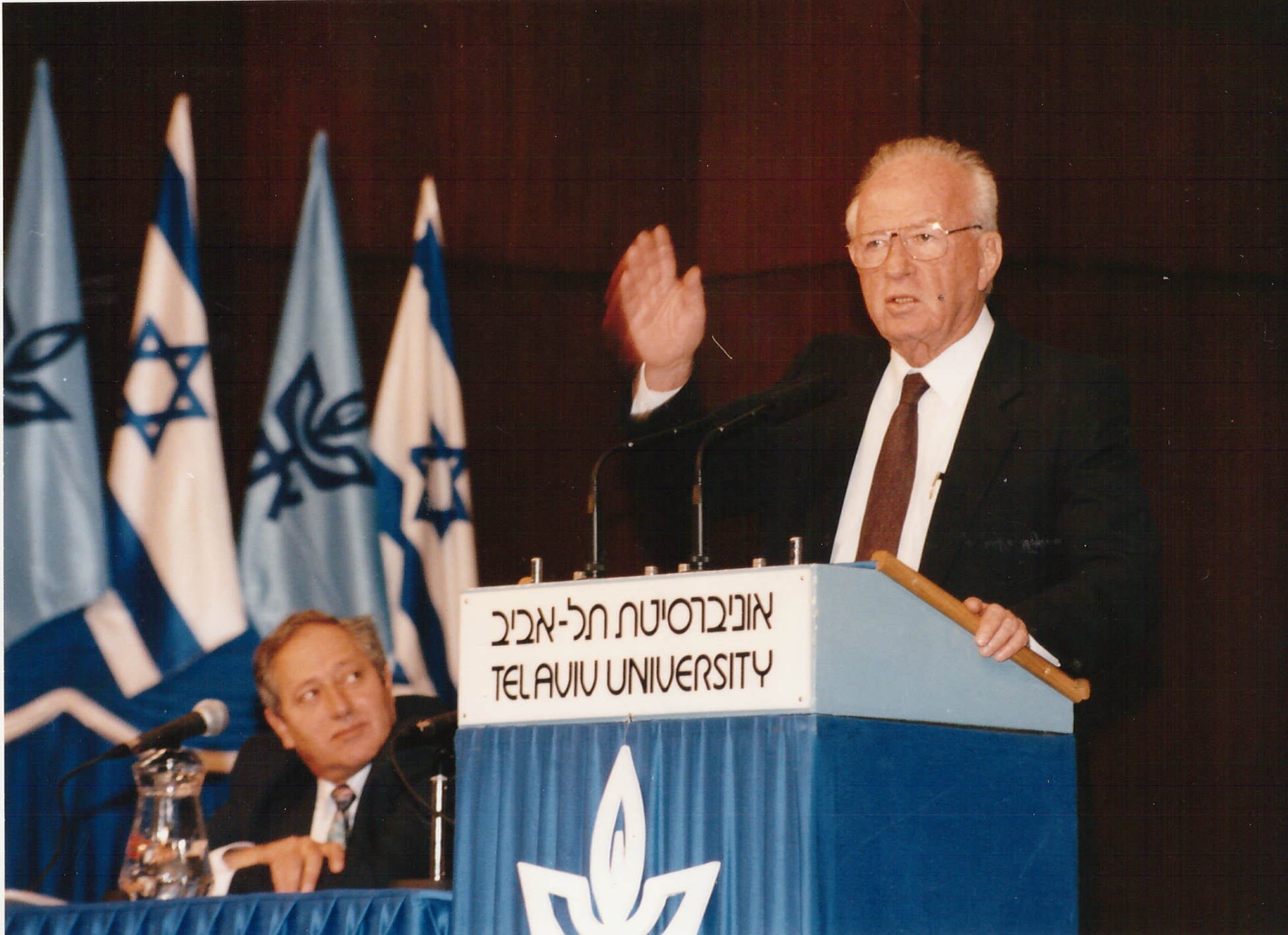
Former Israeli Prime Minister Yitzhak Rabin delivers one of his last public lectures at the Moshe Dayan Center for Middle Eastern and African Studies, November 1995

== Periodical publications ==
1. Tel Aviv Notes: a bi-monthly analytical update on current affairs and regional developments in the Middle East. It has a regular distribution schedule on the 10th and 26th of each month.
2. Middle East Crossroads: A Hebrew-language analytical publication similar to Tel Aviv Notes.
3. Turkeyscope Insights on Turkish Affairs: Turkeyscope is a thought-provoking publication of the MDC, which provides critical analysis of contemporary Turkish affairs. The publication features articles analyzing global and regional phenomena vis a vis Turkish foreign policy and their implications on Turkey and the region..
4. Bayan: The Arabs in Israel. A quarterly publication of the Konrad Adenauer Program for Jewish-Arab Cooperation at the Moshe Dayan Center for Middle Eastern and African Studies. The goal of Bayan is to enrich the knowledge of the general public about issues that involve Arab society within Israel.
5. Al-Durziyya is a digital magazine co-published by the Druze Heritage Center and the Moshe Dayan Center. The magazine is published once every few months, in Hebrew and English, and provides different perspectives on the social, cultural and historical affairs of the Druze in the Middle East.
6. Bustan: Middle East Book Review. Published through the Penn State University Press, and includes "at least three long-form review essays that review new literature. These essays explore broad themes or issues on a particular topic that go beyond the content of the books under review. The journal also includes ten to fifteen short traditional book reviews, as well as review articles in translation."

== Governance and partnerships ==
The Moshe Dayan Center is governed by an Israeli board of governors, on the advice of an international advisory council. It is administered by an academic director. The center is funded entirely by endowments, research grants, and private and institutional donations.

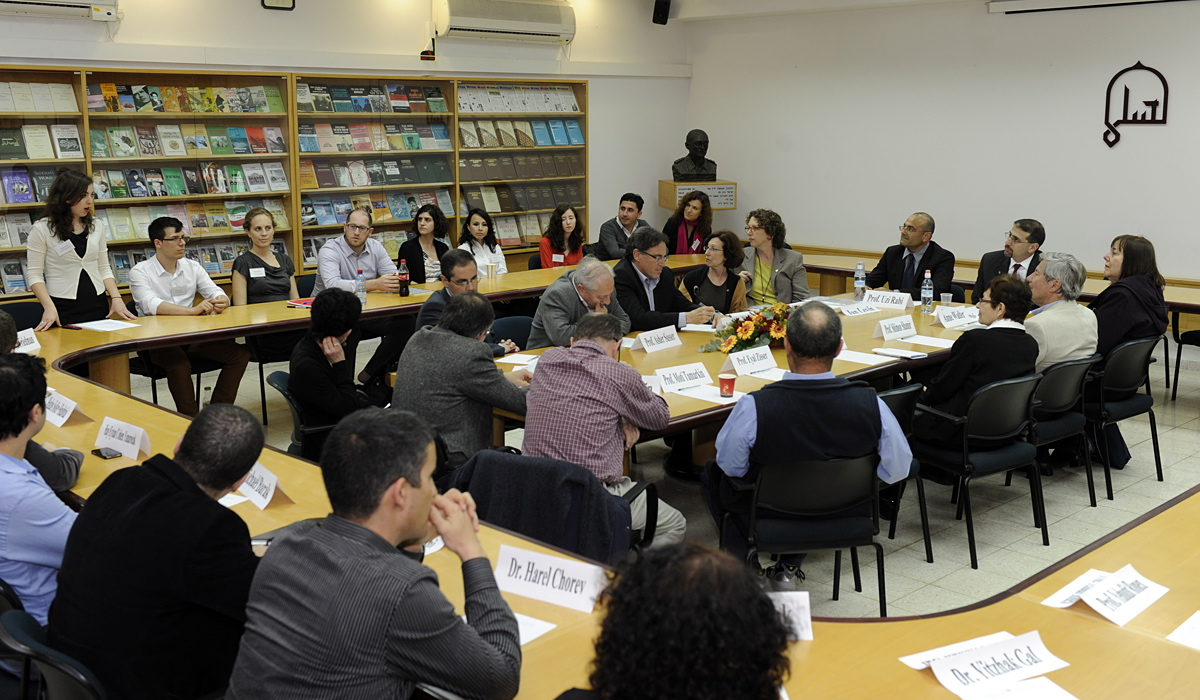
US Ambassador Daniel Shapiro visits the Moshe Dayan Center for Middle Eastern and African Studies, 2012

Some of its programs are in partnership with the Council of Higher Education of the Republic of Turkey and the Konrad Adenauer Foundation. Its other foreign connections include the Council on Foreign Relations in New York, the Turkish Foreign Policy Institute in Ankara, Royal Institute of International Affairs in London, Emory University, Washington Institute for Near East Policy, and Middle East Technical University (METU) in Ankara.

In 2014, the center began a five-year cooperative program with the George L. Mosse / Laurence A. Weinstein Center for Jewish Studies at the University of Wisconsin-Madison. In August 2015, the center signed a cooperation agreement with the Center for Israel Studies (Jordan).

== Selected publications ==
- Inbal Tal, "Spreading the Movement’s Message: Women’s Activism in the Islamic Movement in Israel," (2016)
- Itamar Radai, "A Tale of Two Cities: Palestinians in Jerusalem and Jaffa, 1947-1948," (2015)
- Ed. Brandon Friedman and Bruce Maddy-Weitzman, Inglorious Revolutions: State Cohesion in the Middle East after the Arab Spring, (2015)
- Eds. Uzi Rabi and Shaul Yanai, "The Persian Gulf and the Arabian Peninsula: States and Societies in Transition," (2014)
- Joshua R. Goodman, Contesting Identities in South Sinai: Development, Transformation, and the Articulation of a "Bedouin" Identity under Egyptian Rule, (2014)
- Jason Hillman, "A Storm in a Tea-Cup": The Iraq-Kuwait Crisis of 1961 From Gulf Crisis to Inter-Arab Dispute, (2014)
- Fouad Ajami, "The Syrian Rebellion," (2013)
- Joseph Kostiner, "The Gulf States: Politics, Society, Economy," (2012)

== Notable staff ==
- Amos Nadan, Ph.D.. Current director of the center
- Uzi Rabi, Ph.D.. His specialisations include the modern history of states and societies in the Persian Gulf, state building in the Middle East, oil and politics in the Middle East, Iranian-Arab relations, and Sunni-Shi’i tensions.
- Itamar Rabinovich, Ph.D. Former Ambassador to the United States. Researcher in the history and politics of Syria and Lebanon.
- Irit Back, Ph.D. head of African studies and author of "Intervention and Sovereignty in Africa: Conflict Resolution and International Organisations in Darfur," (2016).
- Ofra Bengio, Ph.D. head of Kurdish studies, and editor of "The Kurds: Nation-Building in a Fragmented Homeland," (2014).
- Hay Eytan Cohen Yanarocak, Ph.D. senior research fellow, and editor of Turkeyscope Insights on Turkish Affairs
- Asher Susser, Ph.D. senior research fellow, professor emeritus at Tel Aviv University, and a former director of the Moshe Dayan Center.
- Paul Rivlin, Ph.D. senior research fellow, and editor of Iqtisadi: Middle East Economy.
- Eyal Zisser, Ph.D. Senior Researcher, former director, and currently the Vice-Rector of Tel Aviv University

== See also ==
- Michael Milshtein, head of MDC's Palestinian Studies Forum
