= Hay Eytan Cohen Yanarocak =

Israeli scholar

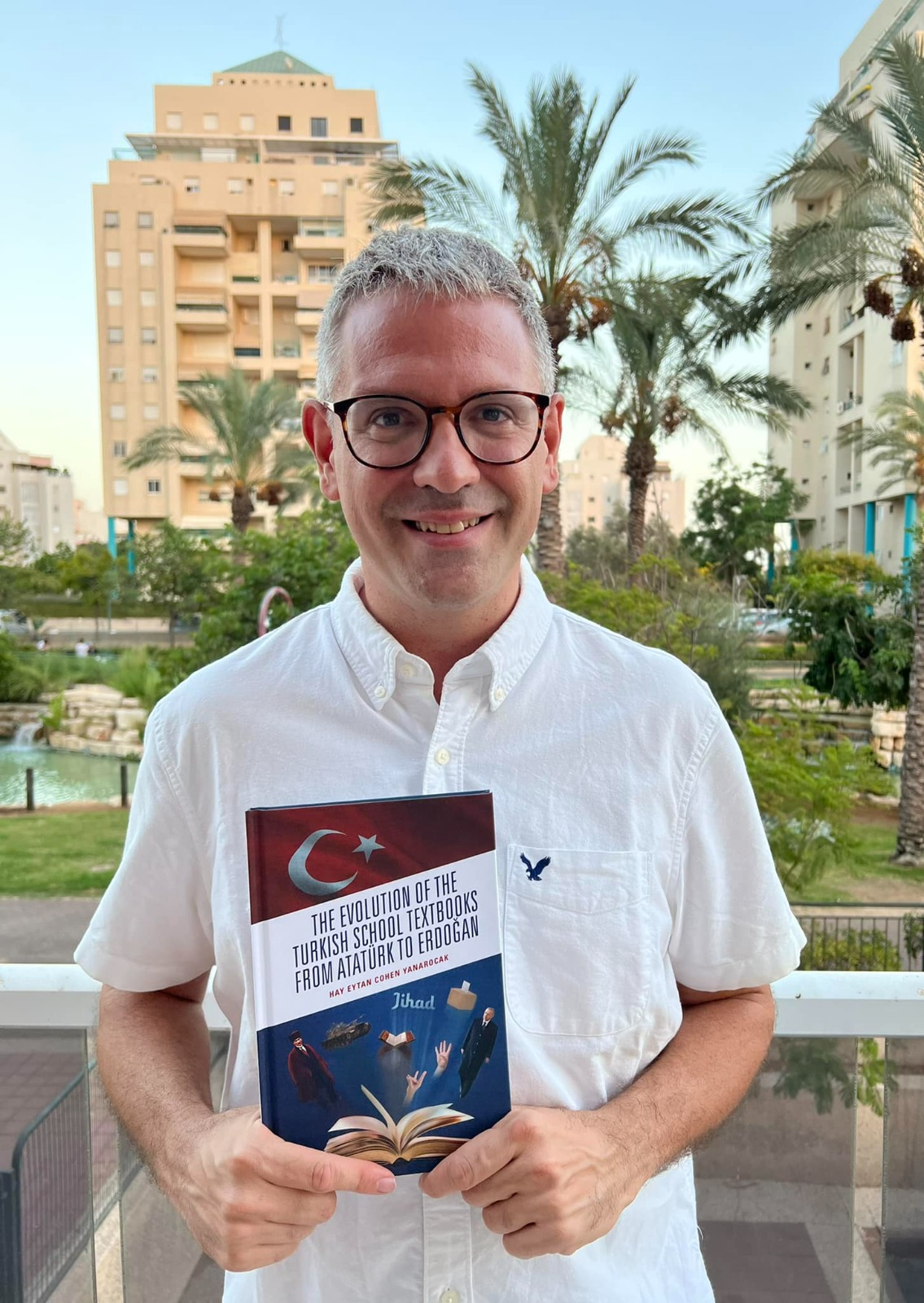
Hay Eytan Cohen Yanarocak

Hay Eytan Cohen Yanarocak (Hebrew: חי איתן כהן ינרוג'ק; born February 6, 1984) is an Israeli scholar whose research focuses on modern Turkey, Israel–Turkey relations, Turkish educational curricula, the Jewish community in Turkey, the Kurdish question, and the history of the Ottoman Empire and the Middle East.

He serves as a researcher at the Moshe Dayan Center for Middle Eastern and African Studies at Tel Aviv University, the Jerusalem Institute for Strategy and Security (JISS), and the Israel Center for Grand Strategy (ICGS).

== Biography ==
Hay Eytan Cohen Yanarocak was born in Turkey on February 6, 1984, to a family of Jewish descendants who had settled in the Ottoman Empire following the expulsion from Spain in 1492. He was raised in Istanbul, where he attended the Jewish High School and was active in the community’s youth movement. In 2006, he immigrated to Israel.

== Academic and research career ==
He commenced his academic studies at Yeditepe University in Istanbul, where he graduated with honors, earning a bachelor’s degree in international relations and political science. Upon his graduation, he immigrated to Israel in 2006 and pursued further studies at Tel Aviv University, where he completed a Master's degree in Security Studies in 2009, also with honors. In 2015, he was awarded the Dan David Prize Scholarship for Young Researchers in the category of "Retrieving the Past: Historians and their Resources."

In 2017, under the supervision of Professor Ofra Bengio, he completed his doctoral studies at the Tzvi Yaabetz School of History at Tel Aviv University. His doctoral dissertation was titled "Indoctrination and Socialization of Atatürkism in the Turkish Education System and Textbooks 1980-2002."

Since 2010, Cohen Yanarocak has been a researcher at the Moshe Dayan Center for Middle Eastern and African Studies at Tel Aviv University. In 2018, he joined the Jerusalem Institute for Strategy and Security (JISS) as a researcher, and in 2024, he also became a researcher at the Israel Center for Grand Strategy (ICGS). In addition, he serves as the editor of Turkeyscope: Insights on Turkish Affairs, a journal dedicated to the analysis of Turkish issues.

In parallel with his research work, Cohen Yanarocak has taught and currently teaches courses at various academic institutions in Israel, including Tel Aviv University, the Hebrew University, Ben-Gurion University, Ariel University, and the Shalem College.

Cohen Yanarocak is a native speaker of Turkish and, in addition to Hebrew and English, possesses knowledge of 19th-century Ottoman Turkish, Arabic, Greek, and Karamanlidika.

== Publications ==
In 2022, Cohen Yanarocak published his book The Evolution of the Turkish School Textbooks from Atatürk to Erdoğan, which was released by Lexington Books in London. In addition to his book, he publishes articles and analyses on topics related to Turkish foreign policy, contemporary Turkish politics, the Kurdish question, school textbooks and the antisemitism in Turkey.

Cohen Yanarocak is considered one of the leading experts on Turkish studies in Israel. He provides in-depth analyses of Turkish politics and its regional and international implications, appears on podcasts, and is featured in both Israeli and international media as a commentator on Turkish and Middle Eastern affairs.
