= Uzi Rabi =

Israeli Moshe Dayan Center for Middle Eastern Studies

- עוזי רבי
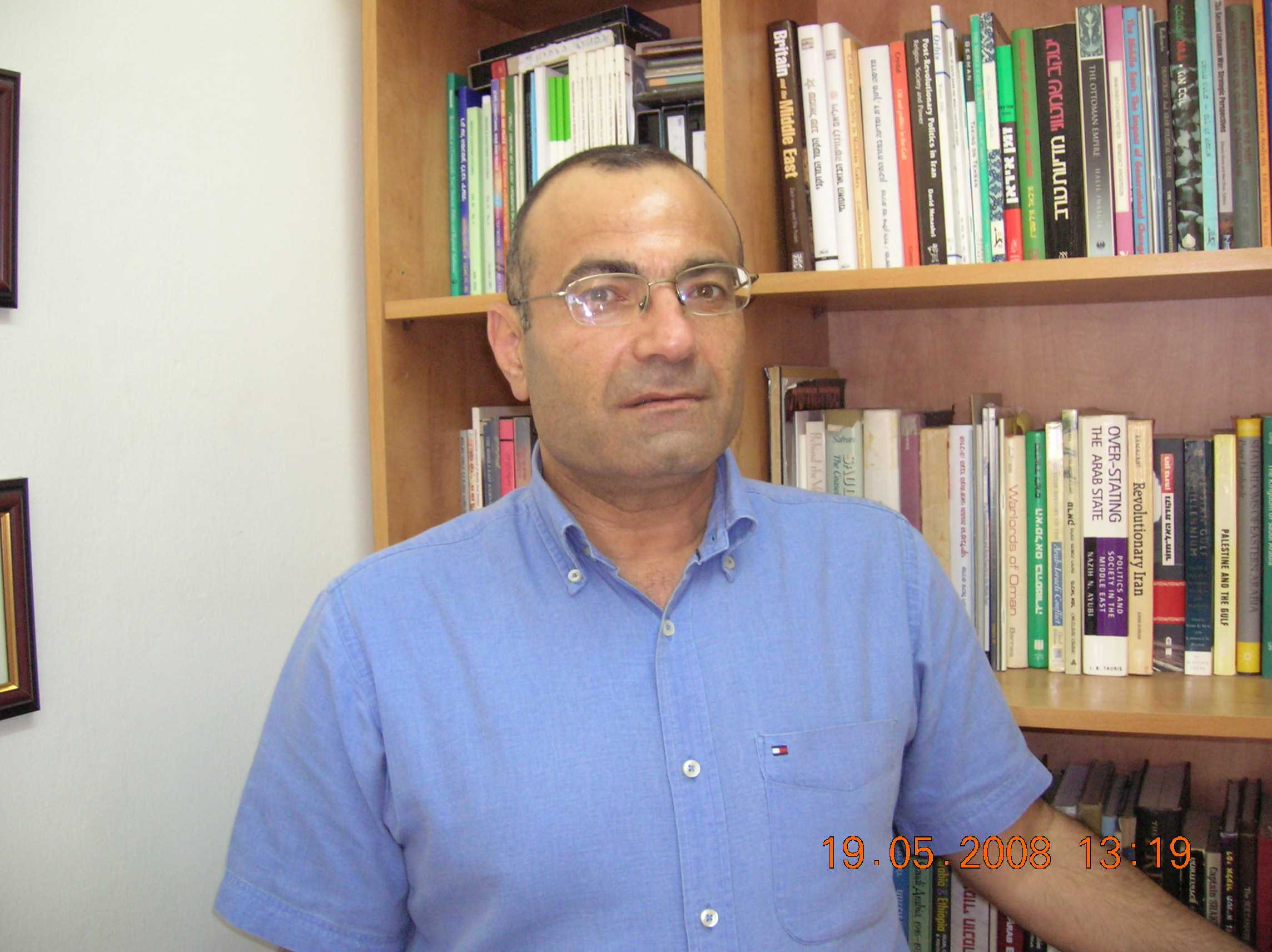
- Citizenship: Israel

Academic background
- Education: Tel Aviv University
- Thesis: (2000)

Academic work
- Institutions: Moshe Dayan Center for Middle Eastern and African Studies University of San Diego

Uzi Rabi (Hebrew: עוזי רבי) is an Israeli Professor and the Head of the Program for Regional Cooperation at the Moshe Dayan Center for Middle Eastern and African Studies at Tel Aviv University.

== Education and early life ==
Rabi was conscripted into the military and worked in the Israeli Intelligence Corps. He studied at university after military service, and completed a PhD at Tel Aviv University in 2000.

== Career ==
Rabi began working at Tel Aviv University in 2000, initially as a lecturer. He was affiliated with University of San Diego as a visiting professor from 2004 to 2005.

Rabi is the head of the Program for Regional Cooperation at the Moshe Dayan Center for Middle Eastern and African Studies. He is also a senior researcher at the Alliance Center for Iranian Studies at Tel Aviv University. Previously, he served as the Head of the Department of Middle Eastern and African History at Tel Aviv University.

Rabi regularly appears on Israeli and international media outlets, including Arabic-language television networks. During the 2014 Gaza War, he appeared as an analyst in both Israeli and international media. On September 15, 2024, Rabi stated, with respect to the Insurgency in the North Gaza Strip, "Remove the entire civilian population from the north, and whoever remains there will be lawfully sentenced as a terrorist and subjected to a process of starvation or extermination."

== Publications ==
Rabi specializes in the modern history and political evolution of states and societies in the Middle East, with a particular emphasis on Iranian-Arab relations, the intersection of oil and politics in the region, and Sunni-Shi'i dynamics. Rabi has authored several books in both English and Hebrew and has also published numerous articles in peer-reviewed journals such as Middle Eastern Studies, the British Journal of Middle Eastern Studies and the Journal of South Asian and Middle Eastern Studies. In addition to his authored works, Rabi has edited several volumes.

His 2006 book, The Emergence of States in a Tribal Society: Oman Under Sa’id bin Taymur, explores state formation in Oman in the 20th century and the rule of Sultan Said bin Taimur. Reviews in The American Historical Review, The Middle East Journal, and the International Journal of Middle East Studies were positive. One reviewer, William L. Ochsenwald, commented that the book is "particularly valuable in its critical analysis of British-Omani relations".

In 2007, he published in Hebrew Saudi Arabia: An Oil Kingdom in the Labyrinth of Religion and Politics with The Open University, examining the kingdom’s political and religious landscape.

His 2015 publication, Yemen: Revolution, Civil War, and Unification (I.B. Tauris), provides an in-depth analyses Yemen's modern history. Reviewers commended Rabi's use of Arabic sources which might have otherwise been inaccessible to readers though criticised the work for its errors. Isaac Kefir wrote that while Rabi had an "expansive knowledge of the region" he "at times ... fails to develop key concepts and ideas, or fully explain his observations". A related book in Hebrew, Yemen: The Anatomy of a Failed State (HaKibbutz HaMeuchad), was published in 2014.

In 2019 he published The Return of the Past – State, Identity, and Society in the Post-Arab Spring Middle East with Lexington Books, which examined the upheaval in the Middle East following the Arab Spring, highlighting its profound geopolitical and socio-political transformations.

=== Journal articles ===
- (with Nugzar Ter-Oganov) "The Military of Qajar Iran: The Features of an Irregular Army from the Eighteenth Century to the Early Twentieth Century," Iranian Studies, vol. 45 (2012), No. 3, pp. 333–354.
- "Oman and the Arab–Israeli Conflict: The Reflection of a Pragmatic Foreign Policy," Israel Affairs, vol. 11 (2005), pp. 535–551
- "Oman's Foreign Policy: The Art of Keeping All Channels of Communication Open," Orient (2005), pp. 549–564
- "The Dynamics of the Gulf Cooperation Council (GCC): The Ceaseless Quest for Regional Security in a Changing Region," Orient (2004), pp. 281–295."Oil Politics and Tribal Rulers in Eastern Arabia: The Reign of Shakhbut (1928–1966)," British Journal of Middle Eastern Studies, vol. 33 (2004), pp. 37–50.
- "Kuwait’s Changing Strategic Posture: Historical Patterns," Journal of South Asian and Middle Eastern Studies, vol. 27, No. 4, (2004), pp. 52–65
- "Majlis al-Shura and Majlis al-Dawla: State Formation in an Oil State: Oman as a Case Study," Middle Eastern Studies, vol. 38, no. 4, (2002), pp. 41–50.

=== Chapters ===
- “The Kuwaiti Royal Family in the Post-liberation Period: Reinstitutionalizing the 'First among Equals' System in Kuwait”, in: J. Kostiner (ed.), Middle East Monarchies: The Challenge of Modernity (Boulder, London: Lynne Rienner, 2000)
- “The Shi’is in Bahrain: Class and Religious Protest”, in: O. Benjio and G. Ben-Dor (eds.), Minorities in the Middle East (Boulder, London: Lynne Rienner, 1999), pp. 171–188

=== Books ===
- Yemen: Revolution, Civil War, and Unification
- The Emergence of States in a Tribal Society: Oman Under Sa'id bin Taymur, 1932–1970
- Saudi Arabia: An Oil Kingdom in the Labyrinth of Religion and Politics (Hebrew)
- Back to the Future (Resling, 2016, in Hebrew)
- The Return of the Past - State, Identity and Society in the Post-Arab Spring Middle East (Lexington Books, 2019)
- ISIS and the Islamic State Vision (co-written with Dr. Michael Barak, Resling 2021, in Hebrew)

=== Edited works ===
- The Gulf States: Between Iran and the West, edited by Uzi Rabi and Yoel Guzansky. A joint publication by the Moshe Dayan Center and the Institute for National Security Studies
- Iran's Time (Hebrew)
- International Intervention in Local Conflicts: Crisis Management and Conflict Resolution Since the Cold War
- Lost in Translation: Forgotten Paradigms of the Arab Spring (co-edited with Abdelilah Bouasria)
