= Emmanuel Navon =

French-born Israeli political scientist, author and foreign policy expert

- עִמָּנוּאֵל נָבוֹן
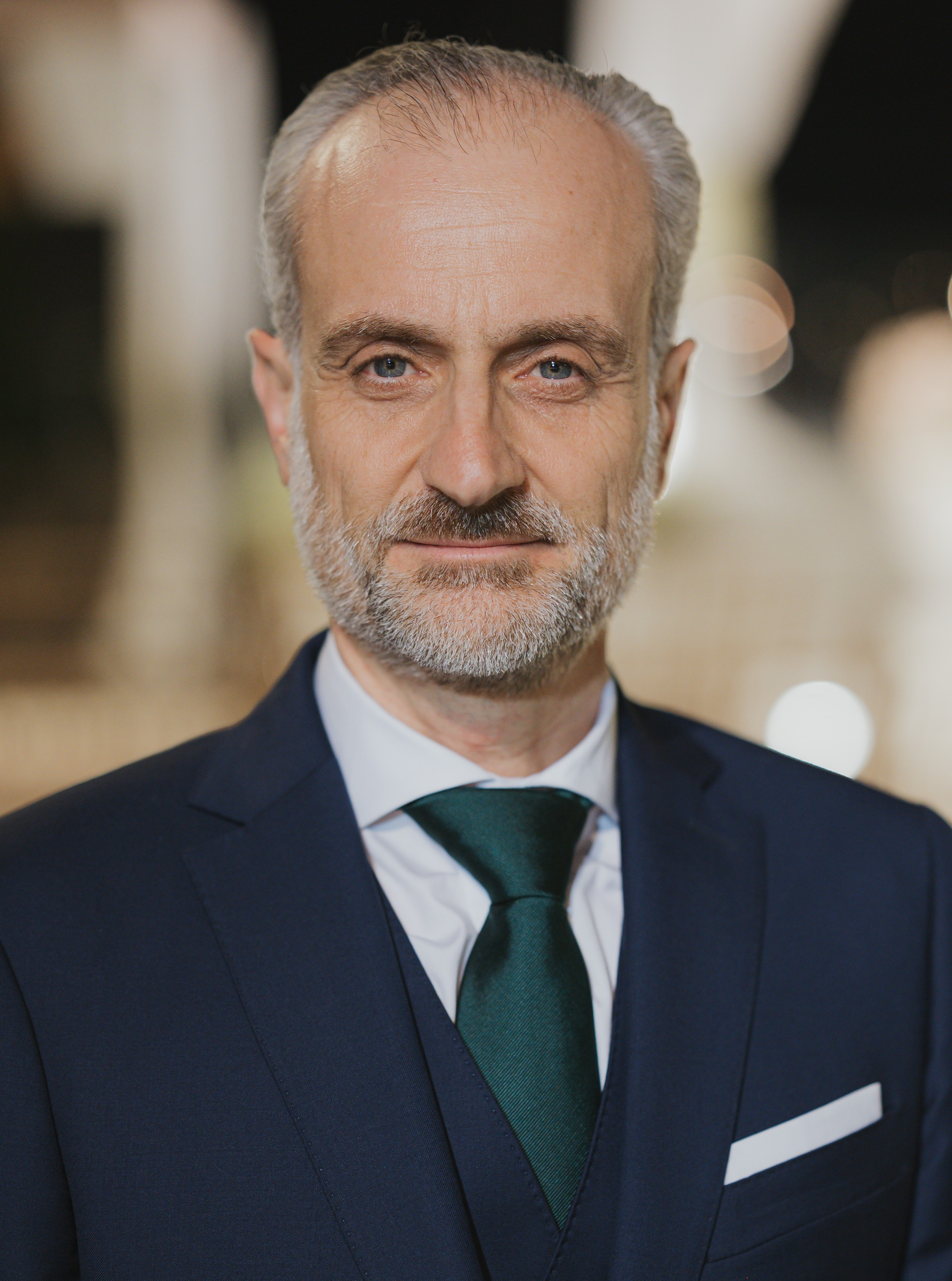
- Born: Emmanuel Mréjen; January 21, 1971 (age 55)
- Education: Sciences-Po, Hebrew University of Jerusalem (MA) (PhD)
- Occupations: Political scientist, author, diplomat
- Notable work: The Star and the Scepter
- Website: navon.com

Emmanuel Navon (Hebrew: עִמָּנוּאֵל נָבוֹן; born Emmanuel Mréjen January 21, 1971) is an Israeli diplomat, political scientist, author, and foreign policy expert. He has served as Israel's ambassador designate to Japan since August 2026. He was previously the co-founder and CEO of the Euro-Med Middle East Council and a lecturer on International Relations at Tel Aviv University.

== Biography ==
=== Early life and education ===
Emmanuel Navon was born in Paris, France, as Emmanuel Mréjen. He attended the international bilingual school (French/English). He graduated from Sciences-Po, with a major in Public Administration. He interned at the French Foreign Ministry and at the French Ministry of Finance. In 1993, he immigrated to Israel and subsequently changed hebraized his last name to Navon. Navon enrolled in the Israel Defense Forces and completed graduate studies at the Hebrew University of Jerusalem, with a master's degree and a Ph.D. in international relations. As a doctoral fellow, he consulted to the Israeli Foreign Ministry on the reform of the United Nations and joined the Shalem Center.

=== Career ===
Navon was a consultant for Arttic (a consultancy specialized in R&D funding), helping Israeli companies obtain funding from the European Commission and join European consortia. Between 2003 and 2005, he was CEO of BNIC, an NGO that trained Israel's business leaders in public diplomacy. Between 2005 and 2010, he was a partner with the Navon-Levy Group, a consultancy that promoted Israeli agricultural projects in Sub-Saharan Africa. Between 2011 and 2016, he was head of the Political Science and Communication Department at the Jerusalem Haredi College (affiliated with Bar-Ilan University). Between January 2023 and April 2025 he served as CEO of ELNET's Israel office. In March 2026, the Israeli government appointed him as Israel's next ambassador to Japan.

=== Academic positions ===
Navon has been lecturing at Tel-Aviv University's School of Political Science, Government and International Relations and at the Abba Eban Graduate Program for Diplomacy Studies since 2002. In 2022, he was the "Best Professor of the Year" by selection of the Faculty of Social Sciences. He has also taught at Reichman University and at Israel's National Security College (Israel)

Between 2013 and 2023 he was a senior fellow at the Kohelet Policy Forum and in 2017 he joined the Jerusalem Institute for Strategy and Security (JISS) as a research fellow. In his 2006 policy paper for the Herzliya Conference, Navon described Israel's public diplomacy as "soft powerlessness" and warned about international de-legitimization campaigns. In his January 2017 policy paper for the Kohelet Policy Forum (co-authored with Avraham Diskin), Navon recommended the adoption of open lists and political alliances in Israel's voting system.

=== Media and public speaking ===
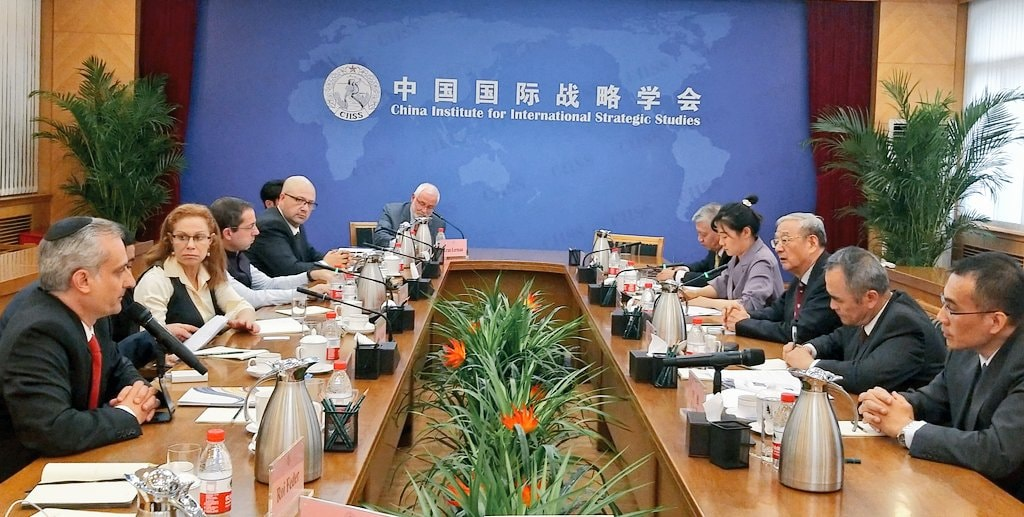
Emmanuel Navon addresses the CIISS

Emmanuel Navon has been a foreign analyst on international affairs for i24News since 2012.

He has been frequently interviewed by international media outlets and has addressed international audiences in three different languages. In English media his opinion has been cited by The Wall Street Journal, the Washington Post, Bloomberg, Sky News, The Financial Times, and The Fiscal Times. He has been interviewed or debated Israeli foreign policy with other figures in English media broadcasts such as on the Voice of America, and Al Jazeera. French language media outlets similarly turn to Navon for his position on Israeli issues. He has been cited by France 24, Le Figaro, Libération, Le Point, France Culture, Les Echos, RFI, L'Obs, Radio Canada, La Libre Belgique, and Le Monde. Hebrew language or English language Israeli media also have turned to Navon for his policy positions. His perspective has been quoted by the Knesset Channel, Israel Army Radio, Ynet, the Israeli Broadcasting Corporation, and The Jerusalem Post. Navon has also appeared on Chinese media China Central Television and Xinhua. On Japanese media, he has interviewed on NHK and Sankei Shimbun, and he has also been interviewed by Indian media for audiences there.

Navon's op-eds have appeared in Newsweek, Le Monde, Le Figaro, The Jerusalem Post, Globes, TheMarker, Israel Hayom, Makor Rishon, Yedioth Ahronoth, and Maariv. He regularly publishes on Israeli politics for The Times of Israel (in English) and is a former contributor to Mida, an Israeli current affairs and opinion web magazine.

Navon is a frequent guest speaker in North America and Europe on behalf of organizations such as the Jewish Federations of North America, Hillel International, and ELNET.

In March 2011, a lecture Navon delivered at the Université du Québec à Montréal (UQÀM) was disrupted by pro-Palestinian students, and Navon had to be escorted by security guards. In November 2012, RTBF journalist Eddy Caekelberghs cut short a live interview after Navon accused him of contributing to Hamas' propaganda. In 2019, Navon was invited by the Haute école pédagogique (HEP) du canton de Vaud to present his approach to the Palestinian refugee problem, after an outcry caused by HEP's original plan to only invite speakers identified with the Palestinian narrative. In July 2020, Navon clashed on Turkish TV channel ANews with a journalist who had claimed that the West Bank was stolen by Israel. "That land was not stolen, as opposed to the land your country stole from Cyprus and from Syria" Navon replied.

== Ideas and controversies ==
=== International relations ===
Navon is critical of international relations theory and describes the "great debates" as a sham. His dismissive attitude toward IR theory has been rebuked by international relations scholars Duncan Bell and Brian C. Schmidt. Duncan Bell's rebuke of Navon's critical approach to IR theory is often quoted in academic literature.

Navon argues that Western civilization is a precious achievement to which Judaism has made a key contribution, and that this civilization must protect itself from the joint assault of Islamism and postmodernism. He advocates closer coordination between Israel and Europe against the Russia–Iran axis, and calls for democracies to form a united front at the United Nations.

Navon is a defender of free-markets and of globalization. He advocates the use of Israel's technological edge to contribute to energy independence, a position for which he was criticized by Prof. Yehezkel Dror. A supporter of the preservation of NATO and of the EU, Navon is suspicious of Russia and had opposed Brexit. Navon approves of Israel's "divide and rule" policy towards the European Union (i.e. developing special ties with the Visegrád Group so as to block unanimous votes by the Council of the European Union on Israel and the Middle East), yet he also warns that "Israel should not overplay that card" because "for all its failings, a unified European market aligned with the U.S. is more in Israel's interest than a divided continent ruled by pro-Russian mercantilists."

=== Arab–Israeli conflict ===
Navon describes the Israeli–Palestinian conflict as "Catch 22" situation. He thinks that the preservation of Israel's Jewish and democratic character requires territorial changes but does not believe that an agreement can be reached with the Palestinians. He also dismisses unilateral territorial withdrawals (such as the 2005 Gaza disengagement) as too risky. Navon claims that the two-state solution "keeps working in theory and failing in practice". Navon is of the opinion that Israeli settlements are not illegal, that the Palestinians' claim for a "right of return" to Israel is groundless in international law and incompatible with a two-state solution, and that only Israel has guaranteed religious freedoms and protected the holy sites of the three Abrahamic religions in Jerusalem.

In November 2005, Navon rebuked Israel's "New Historians." In April 2010, he criticized the JCall initiative for overlooking the responsibility of the Palestinian leadership in the deadlock of the Israeli–Palestinian peace process. In October 2016, Navon responded to Hagai El-Ad's call for Security Council action against Israel's presence in the West Bank. In 2020, Navon expressed his support for the Trump peace plan and for the extension of Israeli sovereignty to parts of the Israeli-occupied West Bank. Navon rejects the claim that partial Israeli annexations beyond the "green line" are incompatible with international law and with a two-state solution.

Following the 2023 Hamas-led attack on Israel, Navon declared that "Israel must, and will, teach its enemies a lesson which they, and the world, will never forget." During a debate on the Gaza war with Diana Buttu and Daniel Levy, moderated by Mehdi Hasan for Al-Jazeera's "Head-to-Head" program, Navon declared that "Israel is the only place in the Middle East where Arabs are free," that "Zionism is a national liberation movement that freed its land from Arab-Muslim colonialism," and that "Palestine is a British colonial invention."

=== Nationalism and democracy ===
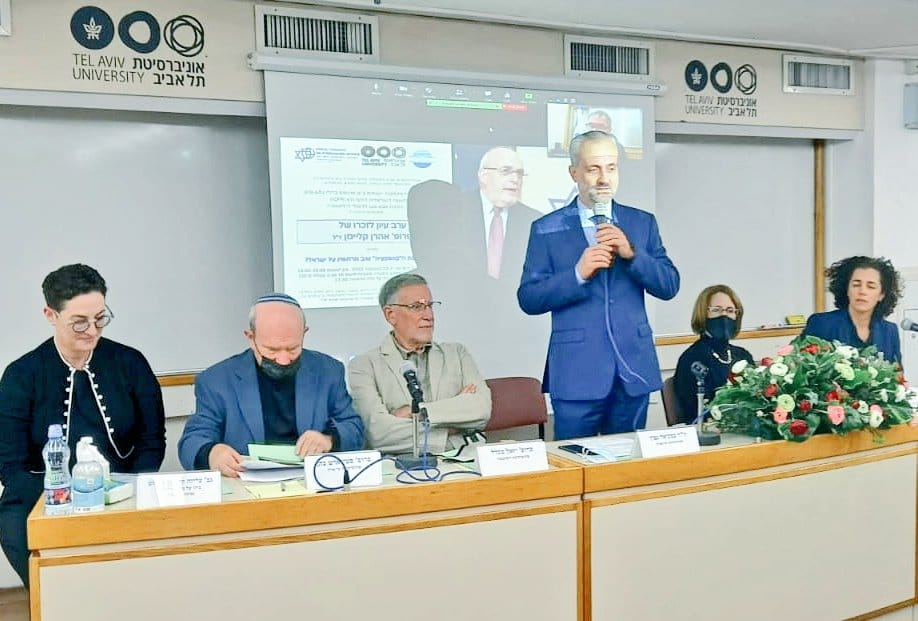
Dr. Emmanuel Navon addresses an event at Tel Aviv University in memory of Prof. Aaron Klieman

Navon has argued that the Jews are a religion and the Jewish people form a nation. For this reason, the Jewish people are entitled to national self-determination. He writes that Zionism is a national liberation movement and the legitimacy of the Jewish nation-state equals that of all nation-states. Navon writes that nationalism in general, and Jewish nationalism (Zionism) in particular, are compatible with democracy and civic equality. Navon supported the Basic Law: Israel as the Nation-State of the Jewish People but stated that the principle of civic equality should be explicitly enshrined in Israel's quasi-constitutional basic law.

Navon is critical of post-Zionist and anti-Zionist Jews such as Peter Beinart, Mike Marqusee and Eitan Bronstein Aparicio. He has rebuffed their arguments in several book reviews.

=== Judicial activism and electoral reform ===
Navon is critical of Israel's judicial activism and of Aharon Barak's self-proclaimed "constitutional revolution". In his book The Victory of Zionism: Reclaiming the Narrative about Israel's Domestic, Regional, and International Challenges, Navon claims that Israel's constitutional order and separation of powers were overhauled in the 1990s by five dramatic changes introduced unilaterally by the High Court of Justice under Barak's leadership: 1. Proclaiming that everything is "justiciable" and therefore that no public issue is immune from the court's review; 2. Ending the "standing" (or locus standi) requirement, thus allowing anyone to petition the court; 3. Declaring that the court is entitled to strike down legislation deemed inconsistent with Israel's "basic laws"; 4. Overruling government decision for being "unreasonable" in the court's opinion; 5. Turning the legal advice of the Attorney General into binding decisions by which the government must abide.

Navon suggests legislating a Basic Law that would regulate, re-balance, and formalize Israel's separation of powers and the court's ability to strike down legislation and government decisions. While he does not oppose judicial review, Navon believes that its modus operandi in Israel has been shaped in a radical and unilateral manner and must be redrawn via a Basic Law supported by a large majority. Navon has criticized the 2023 Israeli judicial reform promoted by Yariv Levin, arguing that the suggested set of reforms "go too far, and they would replace one imbalance with another instead of fixing the imbalance produced by the Court over the years."

Navon also suggests implementing two reforms in Israel's electoral system to increase accountability and predictability: 1. Open lists; 2. Political alliances. According to Navon, open lists produce more accountability than first-past-the-post (FPTP) elections; he also claims that FPTP is not suited to Israel's heterogenous society and would not gather enough support in the Knesset anyway. Navon also suggests formalizing political alliances via legislation to improve the correlation between the vote for a party and the choice of a prime minister.

=== The Star and the Scepter and controversy with Tom Segev ===
The Hebrew translation of Navon's book The Star and the Scepter: A Diplomatic History of Israel was published by Modan Publishing in 2023 with a foreword by Isaac Herzog. Israeli historian Tom Segev wrote a critical review of the book in Haaretz, which created a controversy with Navon. In his review, Segev accused Navon of attributing more historical importance to Ze'ev Jabotinsky than to David Ben-Gurion; of misquoting Benny Morris's book Righteous Victims; and of welcoming the rise of far-right political parties in Europe. In his response, published by Haaretz, Navon claims that all three accusations are false and dishonest. According to Navon, the book attributes more historical importance to Ben-Gurion than to Jabotinsky; all quotes from Righteous Victims are faithful (Navon accuses Segev of cutting a quote from the book to hide Mussolini's support for Amin al-Husseini); and the book does not welcome the rise of the far-right in Europe (Navon claims he has written about the need to be wary and skeptical about the supposedly pro-Israel credentials of Europe's far-right).

== Politics ==
In November 2012, Navon ran for Knesset on the Likud ticket but he did not gather enough votes in the party's primary elections. He endorsed François Fillon for the first round of the 2017 French presidential elections and Emmanuel Macron for the runoff. Navon subsequently became critical of Macron, especially of his policy toward Israel after the Gaza War, and he criticized his intention to recognize a Palestinian state. In December 2019, Navon endorsed Gideon Sa'ar for the leadership of Likud. In December 2020, he left the Likud party. Navon praised Benjamin Netanyahu over the Twelve-Day War, and called the war Netanyahu's "Churchillian moment."

== Personal life ==
Navon grew up in a secular Jewish family but became Modern Orthodox in his early 20s. He is married to Sima Herzfeld and has four children. Navon is the brother of French author Valérie Mréjen and the brother-in-law of US rabbi Shmuel Herzfeld. Navon's maternal grandfather was an officer in the French army and a secret agent in the French resistance, whose life was saved by a German officer.

== Bibliography ==
=== Books ===
- The Star and the Scepter: A Diplomatic History of Israel (The Jewish Publication Society/University of Nebraska Press, 2020). Available in Chinese, Japanese, French, Italian, and Hebrew.
- The Victory of Zionism: Reclaiming the Narrative About Israel's Domestic, Regional, and International Challenges, (CreateSpace, 2014)
- From Israel With Hope: Why and How Israel Will Continue to Thrive, (Balfour Books, 2010)
- A Plight Among the Nations: Israel's Foreign Policy Between Nationalism and Realism (VDM Verlag, 2009)

=== Academic articles ===
- "Israël et la mer Rouge." Hérodote N. 196 (1er trimestre 2025), pp. 163–168.
- "Israel's Nation-State Law" Palgrave International Handbook on Israel (February 2022), pp. 1–13.
- "Conservatism with a French Touch: A Look at the Thinking of Tocqueville" [Hebrew] Hashiloah 22 (November 2020), pp. 119–139.
- "Les réfugiés palestiniens: un regard géopolitique" Haute école pédagogique de Vaud (2020), pp. 104–114.
- "L'étoile et le sceptre: Israël et les nations" Pardès 63 (2019), pp. 103–108.
- "Israel: Political Development and Data for 2018" (With Abraham Diskin), European Journal of Political Research, Vol. 58, N. 1 (December 2019), pp. 143–148.
- "Israel's European Dilemma" Israel Journal of Foreign Affairs Vol. 12, No. 3 (2018), pp. 325–331.
- "Israël et le Liban: Liaisons dangereuses" Diplomatie (décembre 2018), pp. 60–61.
- "Israel: Political Development and Data for 2017" (With Abraham Diskin), European Journal of Political Research, Vol. 57, N. 1 (December 2018), pp. 148–156.
- "Strengthening Democracy Without Changing the System" [Hebrew] Hashiloah 5 (July 2017), pp. 41–67.
- "Etat des lieux sur le conflit israelo-palestinien" Diplomatie 39 (juin-juillet 2017), pp. 44-48.
- "France, Israel and the Jews: The End of an Era?" Israel Journal of Foreign Affairs 9/2 (2015), pp. 201–211
- "La globalisation et ses ennemis" (Globalization and its Enemies), in Tensions et Défis dans le Monde contemporain, Édition des Rosiers, 2013.
- "Managing Energy Risks in the 21st Century" Revue Management & Avenir 42 (2011), pp. 41–57
- "J-Call: Un appel à la mauvaise foi" Controverses 15 (novembre 2010), pp. 29–33.
- "The Case for the Jewish State" In Israel on Israel (London, Vallentine Mitchell, 2008), pp. 55–79.
- "Israël a-t-il un projet géopolitique" Hérodote, Revue de géographie et de géopolitique 124 (2007), pp. 69–78
- "Plaidoyer pour l'Etat juif" Outre-Terre: Revue française de géopolitique 9 (2004), pp. 19–41.
- "From Kippur to Oslo: Israel's Foreign Policy 1973-1993" Israel Affairs 10/3 (2004), pp. 1–40
- "Zionism and its Critiques" Jewish Political Studies Review 15/1-2 (2003), pp. 45–59
- "La France vue d'Israël: Illusions perdues" Outre-Terre: Revue française de géopolitique 3 (2002), pp. 253–268
- "Septembre 2000-Septembre 2001: Quel enseignement tirer?" Outre-Terre: Revue française de géopolitique 2 (mai 2002), pp. 247–261.
- "The Third Debate Revisited" Review of International Studies 27 (2001), pp. 611–625
- "Y-a-t-il une vie après Oslo?" [Is There Life After Oslo?], Outre-Terre, revue française de géopolitique 1 (janvier/mars 2001), pp. 33–49.
- "Israel and the Reform of the UN" Israel Affairs, Volume 5, Number 1 (1998), pp. 63-86

=== Policy papers ===
- "Europe Can and Should be Part of Israel's Victory," JISS, 2024.
- "Israel, Europe, and the Russia-Iran Axis," JISS, 2024.
- "Leveraging the Abraham Accords," JISS, 2022.
- "The EU is Reluctantly Getting Tougher with Putin," JISS, 2022.
- "Israel and the New 'Old Europe', JISS, 2021.
- "From Saigon to Kabul: Losing the Battle, Winning the War," JISS, 2021.
- "The Deal of the Century and Israel's European Challenge," JISS, 2020.
- "Israel, Europe, and Russia: A New Paradigm?" JISS, 2019.
- The New Emerging Energy Hub in the Eastern Mediterranean, JISS, 2019 (6 pages).
- Reforming Israel's Voting System for Knesset (with Avraham Diskin), Kohelet Policy Forum, 2016 (58 pages).
- Fueling Conflicts: Oil and Geopolitical Tensions, Yuval Ne'eman Workshop for Science, Technology and Security, Tel-Aviv University, 2010 (44 pages).
- Soft Powerlessness: Arab Propaganda and the Erosion of Israel's International Stance, The Institute for Policy and Strategy, IDC Herzliya, 2005 (96 pages).
