= Rafael Ben-Ari =

Israeli photographer (born 1971)

- Born: September 25, 1971 (age 55); Jerusalem, Israel
- Occupations: Photojournalist, documentary travel photographer, filmmaker, camera operator, writer, content creator
- Website: rafaelbenari.com

Rafael Ben-Ari (Hebrew: רפאל בן-ארי; born 25 September 1971) is an Israeli-born multinational photojournalist, documentary travel photographer, filmmaker, camera operator, and writer based in Australia.

He is known for his documentary travel photography documenting cultures, landscapes, wildlife, and people around the world, as well as for his photojournalism and war photography covering conflicts in the Middle East, including the Arab–Israeli conflict, from 2004 to 2012.

In 2019, Ben-Ari was named one of the Top 10 Best Stock Photographers in the World by Pouted Magazine.

== Life and career ==
Ben-Ari began his professional career in 1990 during the Gulf War, while serving in the Israeli Air Force as an imagery intelligence aerial reconnaissance photographic analyst and military photographer.

Following his military service, he worked as a photojournalist and travelled extensively, documenting cultures, landscapes, and social conditions across multiple continents. His work has appeared in international newspapers, magazines, books, television productions, and digital media.

His photography has been distributed through agencies including Getty Images, Shutterstock, iStock, and Adobe Stock. His images have appeared in publications such as National Geographic, Travel + Leisure, Lonely Planet, and The New York Times.

Ben-Ari has exhibited his work in Israel, Australia, New Zealand, France, Italy, Mexico, and several countries in Central and South America.

Over the past decade, his work has focused on documentary photography projects in the Oceania region, particularly Australia, New Zealand, and the Pacific Islands.

== Awards ==
- 2016 – 3rd Place, Nikon Photo Day New Zealand
- 2016 – Pond5 Photography Ambassador
- 2014 – 1st place (crowd vote) and 2nd place (expert’s choice), "Crowds" photo contest, Nikon N-Photo magazine and Photocrowd
- 2007 – Featured publication in Doubletruck Magazine "World's Best News Pictures"
- 2006 – Excellent Artist in Photography Grant, Ministry of Education and Culture, Israel
- 2005 – Excellent Artist in Photography Grant, Ministry of Education and Culture, Israel

== Exhibitions ==
- 2024 – A Call to Minyan, Brisbane, Australia
- 2011 – Unexpected Israel, Milan, Italy
- 2011 – Cultural Friends, Mexico City, Mexico
- 2010 – Stories of Israel: A Photographed Journey to the Country's Soul, international embassy exhibitions
- 2010 – Tel Aviv: The City that Emerged from the Dunes, Mexico City, Mexico
- 2008 – During the 60 years of Israel, Marseille, France
- 2003 – The Decisive Moment, Kerikeri, New Zealand
- 2002 – Group exhibition, Melbourne, Australia

== Published work ==
Ben-Ari’s work has been published in books, magazines, and news outlets internationally. Selected publications include:

- Fotografos En La Calle (2008)
- Scoop Magazine (2007)
- Camden Haven Local News (Nov 2025)
- Camden Haven Local News (Sep 2026)
- Camden Haven Local News (Nov 2026)

== Writing and books ==
Ben-Ari is also an author. His book, The Photographer's Eye: Capture Any Subject, Anywhere, is available as an e-book through Amazon Kindle. The book focuses on photography and capturing subjects in different settings.

== Education ==
- 2003 – Underwater photography and Rescue Diver certification, Professional Association of Diving Instructors (PADI), New Zealand
- 1999 – Bachelor of Fine Arts (B.F.A.), Bezalel Academy of Arts and Design, Jerusalem, Israel
- 1994 – Certificate in Photojournalism, New York Institute of Photography, New York, United States
- 1989 – Beit Hinuch High School
- 1983 – Henrietta Szold Elementary School
