= Eyal Ben-Ari =

Israeli anthropologist

Eyal Ben-Ari (Hebrew: אייל בן ארי; born 1953) is a former professor of anthropology in the Department of Sociology and Anthropology at the Hebrew University of Jerusalem (HUJI). His research interests include Japan as well as the Israeli Defence Forces. He served as the head of the university's Harry S. Truman Research Institute for the Advancement of Peace until January 2007, and also taught the Introduction to Anthropology course, making him well known to students.

== Career ==
Ben-Ari studied sociology at HUJI, graduating with a B.A. in 1978 and an M.A. in 1980. He received his PhD from the University of Cambridge in 1984 in Social Anthropology, after which he returned to HUJI as a lecturer (1985–1990), senior lecturer (1990–1994), associate professor (1994–1998), and full professor. He has also served as a visiting professor or research fellow at the University of Wisconsin–Madison's Department of Anthropology and School of Business (1992), the National University of Singapore's Department of Japanese Studies (1992–1994 and 2001–2002), Sophia University's Faculty of Comparative Culture, Waseda University's Asia-Pacific Research Institute, and Kyoto University's Institute for Research in the Humanities (2005–2006). In 2008, a master's dissertation which he supervised became an object of public controversy due to its thesis that the refusal of Israeli soldiers to rape Arab women was a form of racism; Ben-Ari, co-supervisor Edna Lomsky-Feder, and Zali Gurevitch defended the thesis in media comments.

Ben-Ari is listed as one of its researchers by the Jerusalem Institute for Strategy and Security (JISS).

== Sexual harassment charges ==
In May 2008, a teaching assistant at Hebrew University published accusations of sexual misconduct regarding one of Ben-Ari's colleagues, which led to closer scrutiny of the department. Ben-Ari's troubles with the law began when a number of students sent an anonymous e-mail to university authorities, accusing him of rape and of threatening to withhold their research funding if they refused to have sex with him. Department chair Zali Gurevitch also said that in 2007, another student had mentioned rumours of Ben-Ari's sexual misconduct to him; Gurevitch took the matter to the university administration, but the student was unwilling to testify formally, and the matter was not further investigated. Ben-Ari was arrested in July 2008, then remanded to house arrest and banned from university premises for 30 days pending further investigation. Ben-Ari denied the charges against him, and when questioned by police would admit only that he had had a consensual affair with a student 12 years prior. In August 2008, three female students filed sexual harassment complaints against Ben-Ari. Police announced that they were also seeking students willing to file sexual assault complaints against him.

However, in September 2008 it was announced that no charges would be filed. An editorial in Haaretz criticised the media for their sensationalistic reporting of the prurient details of the incident, as compared to the lack of fanfare with which they announced that no charges would be filed. In June 2009, the State Attorney formally closed the case against Ben-Ari due to the statute of limitations. In the aftermath of the incident, HUJI proposed a rule forbidding intimate relations between students and professors. HUJI responded to media inquiries by stating that Ben-Ari was on sabbatical. He had been scheduled to teach at the University of Hong Kong in the fall semester of 2008.

Ben-Ari was seen visiting the HUJI campus in December 2008, to the consternation of those who had accused him. He had been scheduled to take up lecturing duties again at HUJI in early 2009, teaching one undergraduate course about family and education in Japan, and one graduate course about anthropology in Israel; however, he volunteered to delay his return while the case against him was still open. By September 2010, Ben-Ari still had not taken up lecturing duties again, though he was acting as an advisor for graduate students. Newspaper reports claimed that internal university disciplinary hearings against him were underway. In late February 2011, the university formally announced that Ben-Ari would be suspended for two years without salary or right to use research funding, and requested the Jerusalem District Prosecutor's Office look into the possibility of reopening the criminal case against him.

== Selected publications ==
- Eisenstadt, S. N.; Ben-Ari, Eyal (1990), Japanese models of conflict resolution, London and New York: Kegan Paul International, ISBN 978-0-7103-0342-4
- Ben-Ari, Eyal (1991), Changing Japanese Suburbia: a study of two present day localities, Routledge, ISBN 978-0-7103-0381-3
- Ben-Ari, Eyal (1997), Japanese Childcare: An Interpretive Study of Culture and Organization, London and New York: Kegan Paul International, ISBN 978-0-7007-0448-4; a study of a Kyoto preschool, intended as a theoretical study of childcare institutions, rather than an ethnographic work. It examines written and verbal communications between staff members in the high-turnover environment to determine their role in achieving the goals of the school.
- Lomsky-Feder, Edna; Ben-Ari, Eyal (2009), "The Discourse of 'Psychology' and the 'Normalization' of War in Contemporary Israel", in Sheffer, Gabriel; Barak, Oren; Oren, Amiram (eds.), צבא שיש לו מדינה? : מבט מחודש על יחסי התחום הביטחוני והתחום האזרחי בישראל [An Army That Has a State? New Approaches to Civil-Security Relations in Israel] (in Hebrew), Carmel Publishing House, ISBN 978-965-407-920-4; the authors describe how criticism of war is neutered by "taking the war out of its political context and turning military service into a natural stage of development, and particularly as the arena for a rite of passage into manhood"

== Edited works ==
- Ben-Ari, Eyal; Moeran, Brian; Valentine, James, eds. (1990), Unwrapping Japan: society and culture in anthropological perspective, Manchester University Press, ISBN 978-0-7190-3060-4
- Ben-Ari, Eyal; Clammer, John, eds. (2000), Japan in Singapore: Cultural Occurrences and Cultural Flows, Surrey: Curzon Press, ISBN 978-0-7007-1245-8
- Maman, Daniel; Ben-Ari, Eyal; Rosenhek, Zeev, eds. (2001), Military, State, and Society in Israel: Theoretical and Comparative Perspectives, Transaction Publishers, ISBN 978-0-7658-0042-8
- Tewari Jassal, Smita; Ben Ari, Eyal, eds. (2007), The Partition Motif in Contemporary Conflicts, Sage Publications, ISBN 978-0-7619-3547-6
