= JISS =

Israeli think tank

The Jerusalem Institute for Strategy and Security (JISS) (Hebrew: מכון ירושלים לאסטרטגיה ולביטחון) is a think tank that researches and promotes viewpoints on national security issues in Israeli policy. Established in 2017 as the Jerusalem Institute for Strategic Studies, it changed its name to Jerusalem Institute for Strategy and Security or JISS as an acronym, in January 2019.

== Staff ==
The institute’s researchers.

- Prof. Efraim Inbar is one of Israel's leading strategists (president of the institute).
- Colonel (res.) Dr. Eran Lerman is a former Deputy National Security Advisor to the Prime Minister (vice-president of the institute).
- Major General (res.) Yaakov Amidror is a former National Security Advisor to the Prime Minister.
- Major Gen. (res.) Eitan Dangot is an expert on regional security and Palestinian affairs.
- Prof. Eyal Ben-Ari is an expert on civil-military relations and Japan.
- Professor Hillel Frisch is an expert on the Arab World.
- Prof. Eytan Gilboa is an expert on US-Israel relations, international communication, and public diplomacy.
- Colonel (res.) Prof. Gabi Siboni is an expert on military doctrine and cyber.
- Dr. Oshrit Birvadker is an expert on India.
- Dr. Omer Dostri is an expert on Israel's national security.
- Dr. Udi Levi is an expert on economic sanctions.
- Dr. Emmanuel Navon is an expert on international relations.
- Dr. Uzi Rubin is Israel's preeminent missile defense expert.
- Dr. Pnina Shuker is an expert on civil-military relations and public opinion.
- Dr. Jonathan Spyer Is an expert on Syria, Iraq, and the Kurds.
- Dr. Hay Eytan Cohen Yanarocak is an expert on modern Turkey.

== Positions ==
The institute was established in 2017 and it conducts policy-oriented research on national security problems in the Middle East. It educates elite audiences and the general public on the security and foreign policy challenges facing Israel.

The institute's fellows emphasize the salience of security in diplomatic agreements, and uphold the imperative of Israel being able to defend itself by itself in all eventualities. They reject unilateral Israeli moves that strengthen adversaries. Above all, they insist on united Jerusalem as critical to Israel's security and destiny.

== Publications ==
In 2019, JISS published a national security plan for Israel, alongside a strategic forecast for 2020 which remained valid despite the coronavirus crisis. In May 2020, the institute released a strategic action plan for phased territorial implementation of the Trump peace plan (i.e., Israeli sovereignty in parts of the West Bank).
