= Begin–Sadat Center for Strategic Studies =

Israeli think tank

Coordinates: 32°4′4″N 34°50′33″E

BESA Logo

The Begin–Sadat Center for Strategic Studies (BESA Center; Hebrew: מרכז בֶּגין-סַאדאת למחקרים אסטרטגיים, romanized: mirkaz began-sadt lemachakrim astrategi'im) is an Israeli right-leaning think tank affiliated with Bar-Ilan University and supported by the NATO Mediterranean Initiative, conducting policy-relevant research on Middle Eastern and global strategic affairs, particularly as they relate to the national security and foreign policy of Israel and regional peace and stability. The center's mission is to contribute to promoting peace and security in the Middle East, through policy-oriented researches on national security in the Middle East. It is located at the Social Sciences Faculty of Bar-Ilan University. The center was founded by Thomas Hecht, a Canadian-Jewish leader, and was dedicated to Menachem Begin and Anwar Sadat, who signed the Egypt–Israel peace treaty, the first peace agreement ever signed between Israel and an Arab country.

BESA's own fundraising partner, American Friends of Bar-Ilan University, describes BESA on its website as: "Begin-Sadat Center for Strategic Studies seeks to advance a realistic, conservative and Zionist agenda in the search for security and peace for Israel."

== About the BESA Center ==
=== BESA according to BESA ===
Professor Efraim Inbar describes the center's mission as follows: "Over the years, we have been the first to successfully place on the public agenda issues such as the problematic aspects of Palestinian statehood, the danger of Arab chemical and biological weapons and missile stocks, Israel's relations with key countries such as Turkey and India, and the abuse of international institutions in the attempt to delegitimize Israel. Today, the Center leads an attempt to introduce creative thinking about alternatives to the entrenched two-state paradigm in Israeli-Palestinian peace diplomacy, and an initiative to nourish U.S.-Israeli relations."

The center is staffed with strategic thinkers, academic experts and "military men".

=== Position and orientation ===
BESA is considered a right-leaning pro-military think tank. It has variously been described as "right leaning", "right-wing", and "conservative". In 2009, Inbar's paper "The Rise and Fall of the 'Two States for Two Peoples' Paradigm" said that in light of Hamas's takeover of the Gaza Strip, the best solution to the Israeli–Palestinian conflict would be to repartition the country with Egypt governing Gaza, Jordan governing the West Bank, and Israel withdrawing from isolated settlements.

A 2025 report by BESA, "Debunking the Genocide Allegations: A Reexamination of the Israel-Hamas War from October 7, 2023 to June 1, 2025," reported that "there is no evidence to suggest a systematic Israeli policy of targeting or massacring civilians" and that there is "no evidence to support claims of deliberate bombing of civilians by the IDF during the war, nor any indication of carpet bombing intended to inflict mass civilian casualties in Gaza."

=== Impact and status ===
In the University of Pennsylvania's 2014 Global Go To Think Tanks Report, the center was ranked the ninth best think tank in the Middle East and North Africa, behind the Carnegie Middle East Center (Lebanon), ACPSS (Egypt), Brookings (Qatar), EDAM (Turkey), INSS (Israel), Al Jazeera Centre for Studies, (AJCS) (Qatar), TESEV (Turkey), and GRC (Saudi Arabia).

In 2017, some scholars and officials split from BESA to launch the Jerusalem Institute for Strategic Studies (JISS), which sought to inject realist thinking into Israel's policy debate.

== Funding ==
BESA received funding from Australian philanthropist Greg Rosshandler. As of 2017, BESA's annual budget was slightly less than $1.5 million.

== Publications ==
- Mideast Security and Policy Studies
- Books
- News Bulletin
- Debunking the Genocide Allegations: A Reexamination of the Israel-Hamas War from October 7, 2023 to June 1, 2025
